= List of Brown University faculty =

This list of Brown University faculty includes notable current and former professors, lecturers, fellows, and administrators of Brown University, an Ivy League university located in Providence, Rhode Island. Among the awards received by faculty, fellows, and staff are seven Nobel Prizes, nine Pulitzer Prizes, and 17 MacArthur Fellowships.

== Nobel laureates ==
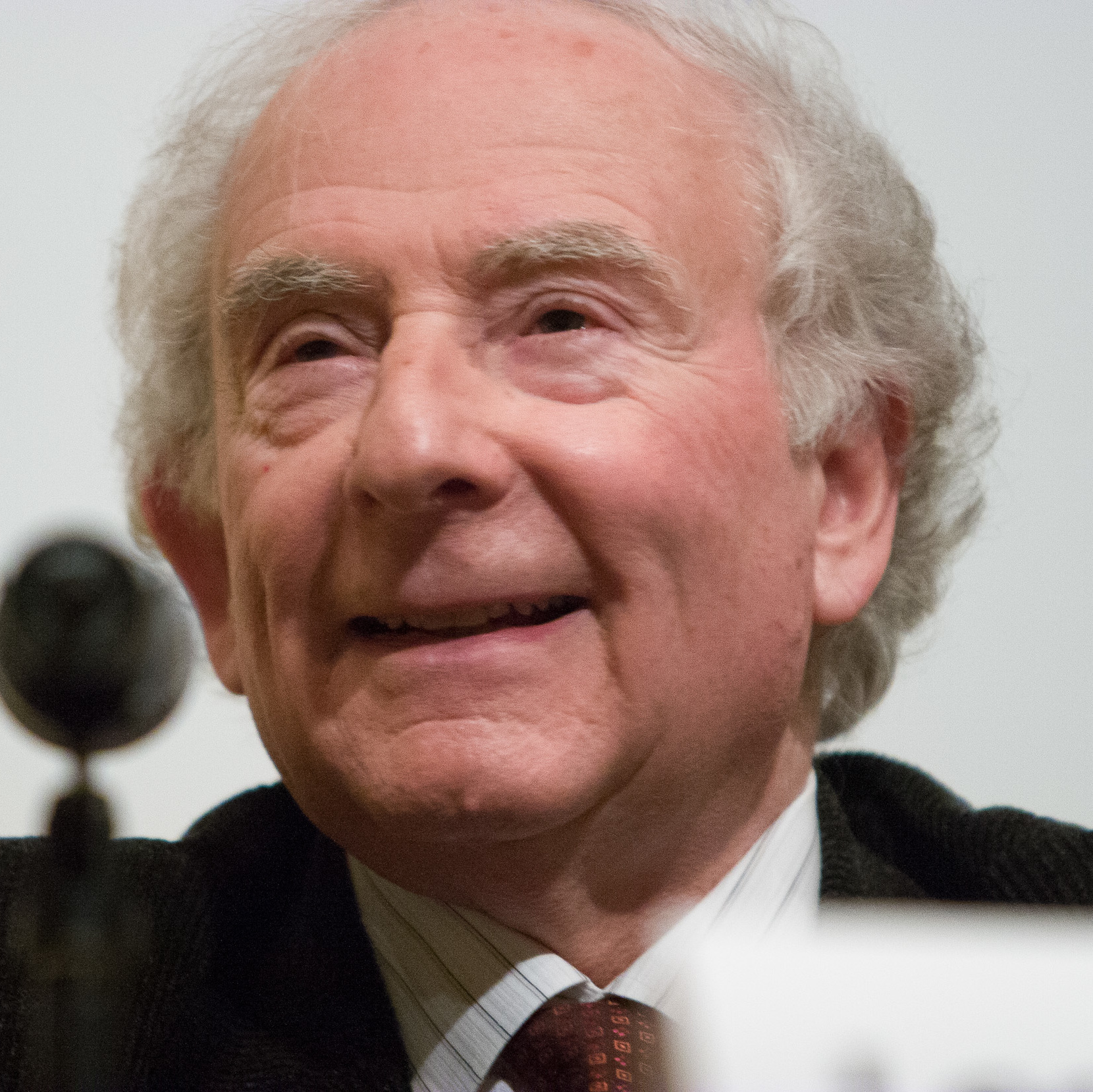
Leon Cooper

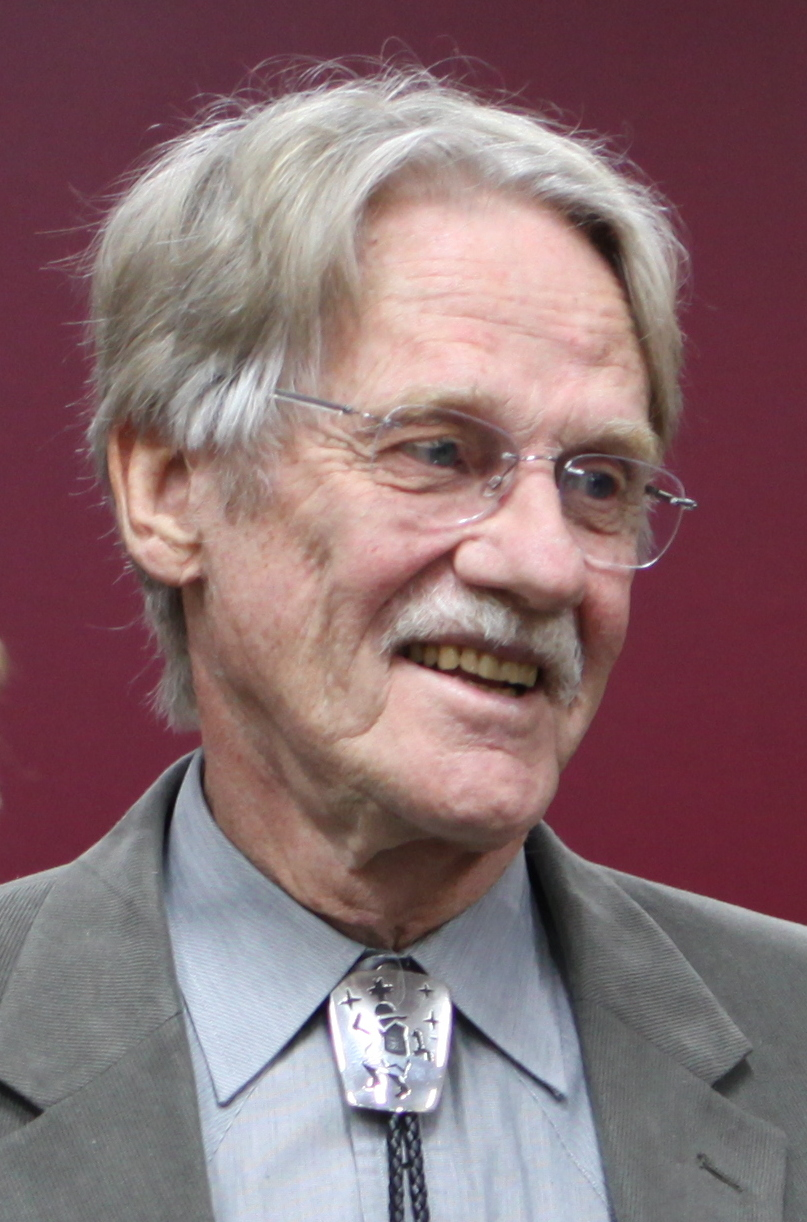
Vernon L. Smith

- Leon Neil Cooper – Nobel laureate (Physics, 1972), "father of superconductivity," and developer of the BCM theory of synaptic plasticity in neuroscience; Thomas J. Watson, Sr. Professor of Physics
- Peter Howitt – Nobel laureate (2025, Economic Sciences), co-originator of the Schumpeterian paradigm with Philippe Aghion, professor emeritus of Economics
- John M. Kosterlitz – Nobel laureate (2016, Physics), for the Kosterlitz-Thouless transition (condensed matter physics); Harrison E. Farnsworth Professor of Physics (1982–)
- Lars Onsager – Nobel laureate (Chemistry 1968), for discovering Onsager reciprocal relations, research instructor in Chemistry (1928–1933)
- Vernon L. Smith – Nobel laureate (2002, Economic Sciences), for developing empirical and scientific methods into economic research; professor of Economics (1967–1968)
- George Snell – Nobel laureate (1980, Physiology or Medicine), for discovering the genetic bases of immunological reactions; instructor in Biology
- George Stigler – Nobel laureate (1982, Economic Sciences), on the influence of government regulation on the economy; professor of Economics (1946–1947)

== MacArthur Fellows ==
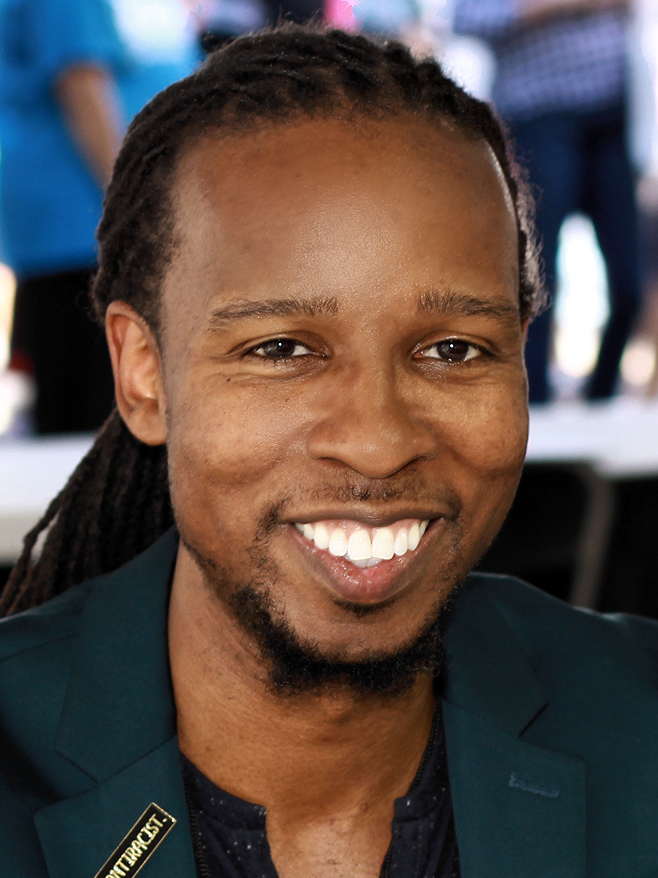
Ibram X. Kendi

- Susan E. Alcock – professor of Classics, director of the Institute for Archaeology and the Ancient World; MacArthur Fellow (2000)
- Shirley Brice Heath – professor-at-large; MacArthur Fellow (1984)
- Mari Jo Buhle – professor emerita of American Studies; MacArthur Fellow (1991)
- Benedict Gross – associate professor of Mathematics (1982–1985); MacArthur Fellow (1986)
- Stephen Houston – Dupee Family Professor of Social Science, professor of Anthropology; MacArthur Fellow (2008)
- John Imbrie – professor emeritus of Geological Sciences; MacArthur Fellow (1981)
- Jacqueline Jones – Clare Boothe Luce Visiting Professor (1988–1990); MacArthur Fellow (1999)
- Ieva Jusionyte – Watson Family University Professor of International Security and Anthropology; MacArthur Fellow (2025)
- Robert Kates – university professor emeritus; MacArthur Fellow (1981)
- John Keene – visiting assistant professor (2001–2002); MacArthur Fellow (2018)
- Ibram X. Kendi – visiting scholar and visiting assistant professor of Africana Studies (2013–2014); MacArthur Fellow (2021)
- Deborah Meier – senior fellow (1995–1997), Annenberg Institute; MacArthur Fellow (1987)
- David Mumford – professor emeritus of Applied Mathematics, recipient of the Fields Medal, MacArthur Fellow (1987)
- David Pingree – university professor and professor of the History of Mathematics and of Classics, MacArthur Fellow (1981)
- Gregory Schopen – Rush C. Hawkins Professor of Religious Studies, MacArthur Fellow (1985)
- Jesse Shapiro – George S. and Nancy B. Parker Professor of Economics (2015–2021); MacArthur Fellow (2020)
- John Edgar Wideman – Asa Messer Professor Emeritus of Africana Studies and Literary Arts; MacArthur Fellow (1993)
- C. D. Wright – Israel J. Kapstein Professor of English; MacArthur Fellow (2004)

== Pulitzer Prize recipients ==
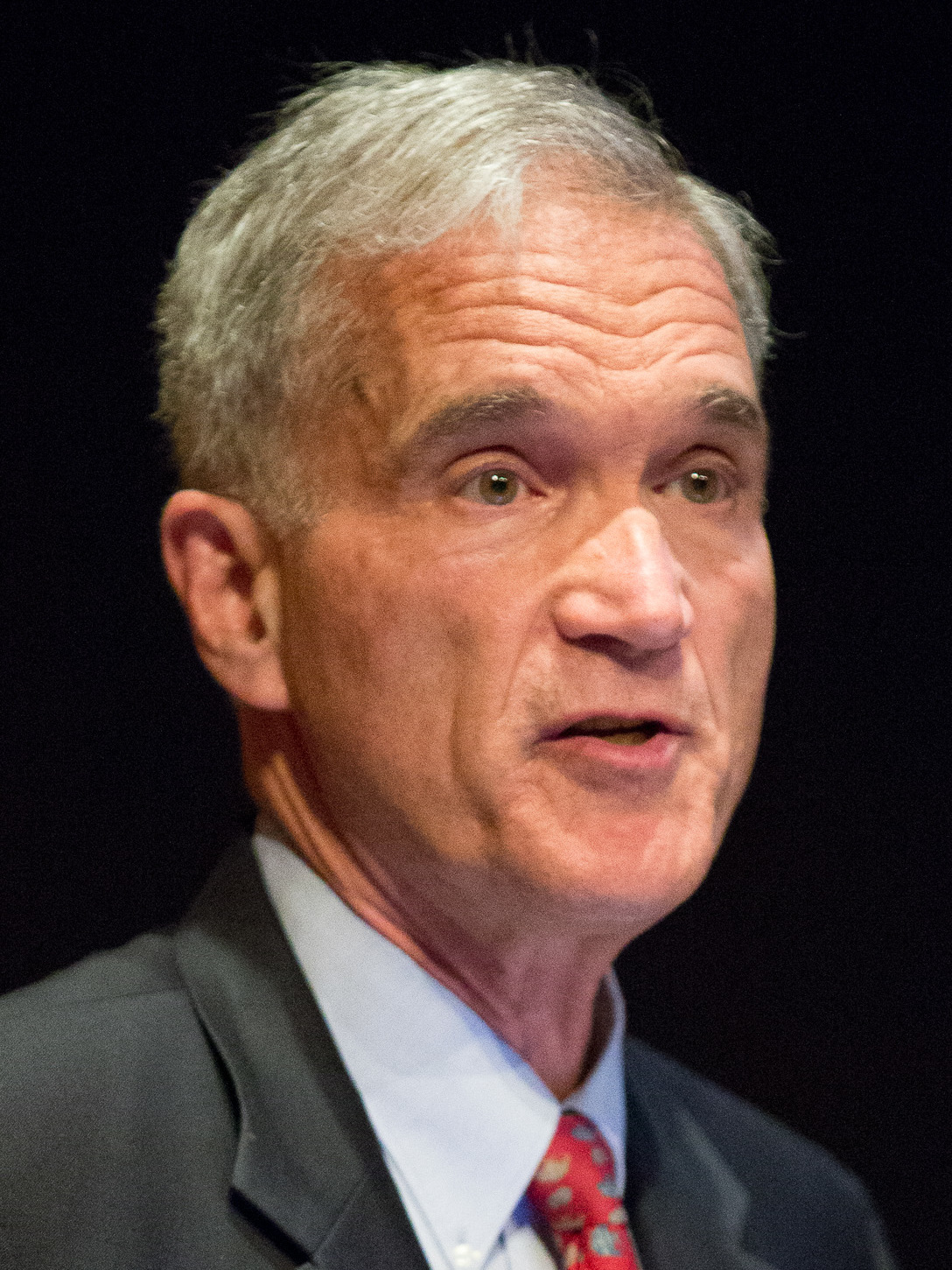
David Kertzer

- Bernard Bailyn – Charles K. Colver Lecturer (1965); recipient of the 1968 Pulitzer Prize for History and 1987 Pulitzer Prize for History; recipient of the 2010 National Humanities Medal
- Richard Eberhart – Phi Beta Kappa poet (1957); recipient of the 1966 Pulitzer Prize for Poetry
- Forrest Gander – professor of English and Comparative Literature; recipient of the 2019 Pulitzer Prize for Poetry, Be With
- David Kertzer (A.B. 1969) – Paul Dupee University Professor of Social Science; recipient of the 2015 Pulitzer Prize for Biography or Autobiography, The Pope and Mussolini
- Philip Levine – visiting writer (1985); recipient of the 1995 Pulitzer Prize for Poetry, The Simple Truth
- Amy Lowell – Marshall Woods Lecturer (1921); recipient of the 1926 Pulitzer Prize for Poetry, What's O'Clock
- Paula Vogel – Adele Kellenberg Seaver '49 Professor of Creative Writing (1984–2008); recipient of the 1998 Pulitzer Prize for Drama, How I Learned to Drive
- Gordon S. Wood – Alva O. Way University Professor and professor of History; recipient of the 1993 Pulitzer Prize for History, The Radicalism of the American Revolution

== Applied sciences ==
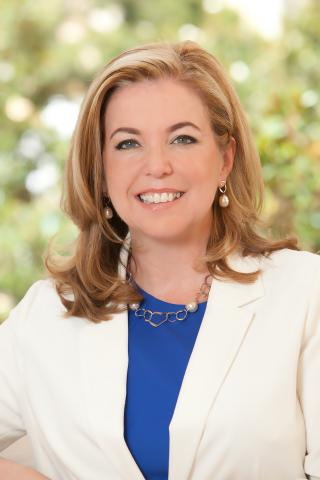
Vicki Colvin

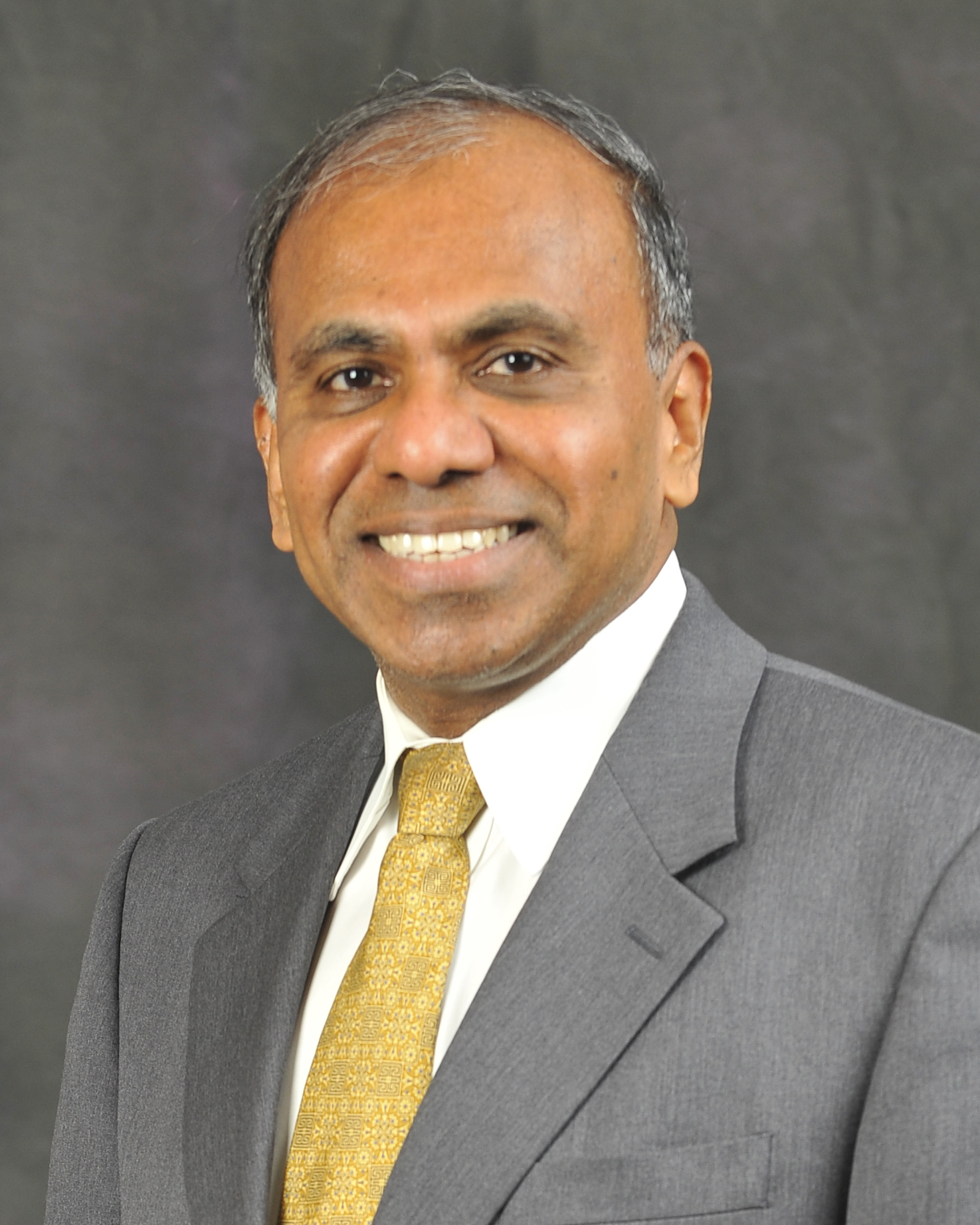
Subra Suresh

- Linda Abriola – Joan Wernig and E. Paul Sorensen Professor of Engineering
- Vicki Colvin – Vernon K. Krieble Professor of Chemistry and Engineering and director of the Center for Biomedical Engineering
- Tejal A. Desai (Sc.B. 1994) – Sorensen Family Dean of Engineering (2022–)
- Alan Needleman – Florence Pirce Grant University Professor of Mechanics of Solids and Structures (1975–2009)
- Arto Nurmikko – L. Herbert Ballou University Professor of Engineering
- Michael Ortiz – professor of Engineering (1984–1995)
- Rob B. Phillips – professor of Engineering (1990–2001)
- Christopher Rose – professor of Engineering (2014–)
- Subra Suresh – professor of Engineering (1983–1993); current president of Nanyang Technological University, former president of Carnegie Mellon University and former director of the NSF

== Humanities ==
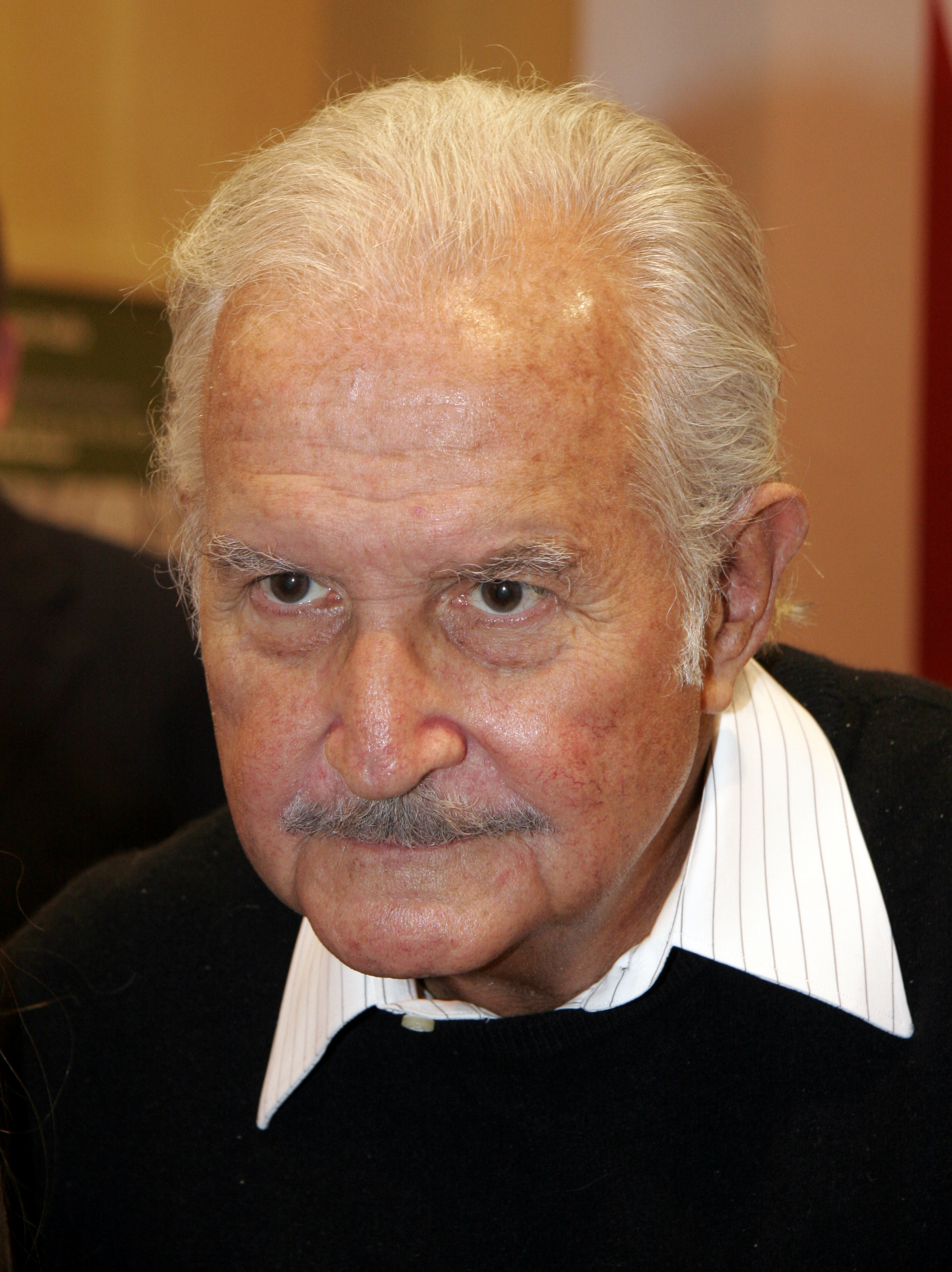
Carlos Fuentes

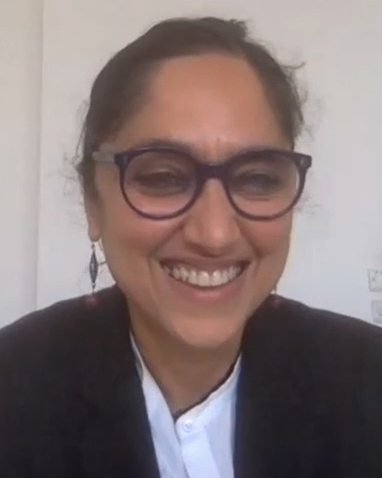
Leela Gandhi

- Amanda Anderson – Andrew W. Mellon Professor of Humanities
- Shadi Bartsch – W. Duncan MacMillan II Professor of Classics
- Shahzad Bashir – Aga Khan Professor of Islamic Humanities
- Rey Chow – Andrew W. Mellon Professor of Humanities (2000–2009)
- Shaye J. D. Cohen – Samuel Ungerleider Professor of Judaic Studies and professor of Religious Studies (1991–2001)
- Beshara Doumani – Mahmoud Darwish Professor of Palestinian Studies, president of Birzeit University
- David Estlund – Lombardo Family Professor of the Humanities
- James L. Fitzgerald – St. Purander Das Distinguished Professor Emeritus of Classics
- Carlos Fuentes – professor-at-large in the Department of Hispanic Studies; widely considered the most influential author of the Spanish-speaking world since Jorge Luis Borges
- Leela Gandhi – John Hawkes Professor of the Humanities and English
- Olakunle George - professor of English and Africana Studies
- Dwight B. Heath – research professor of Anthropology; foremost anthropological researcher and scholar in field of alcohol studies
- Stephen Houston – Dupee Family Professor of Social Science, professor of Anthropology
- Adrienne Keene – Joukowsky Family Assistant Professor of American Studies; Native American academic and activist
- David Konstan – John Rowe Workman Distinguished Professor Emeritus of Classics and of Comparative Literature (1987–2010)
- Hans Kurath – professor of Germanics and Linguistics (1931–1946); known for publishing the first linguistic atlas, the Linguistic Atlas of New England, recipient of the Loubat Prize
- Jacob Neusner – professor of Judaic Studies (1968–1989)
- Adi Ophir – Mellon Visiting Professor of Humanities and Middle East Studies
- Dom Illtyd Trethowan – visiting professor in Theology
- Peter van Dommelen – professor of Archaeology and the Ancient World and Anthropology

=== Africana studies ===
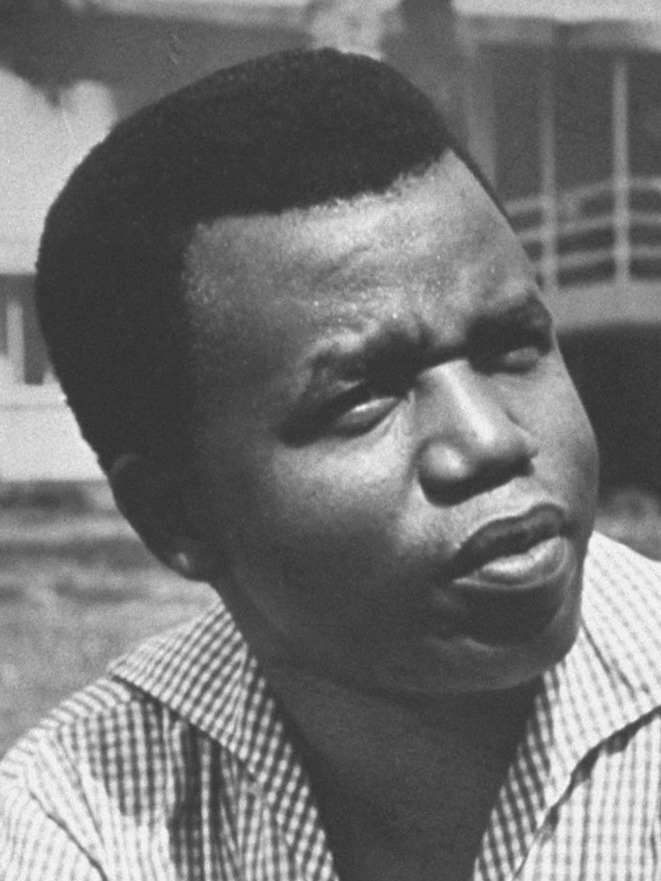
Chinua Achebe

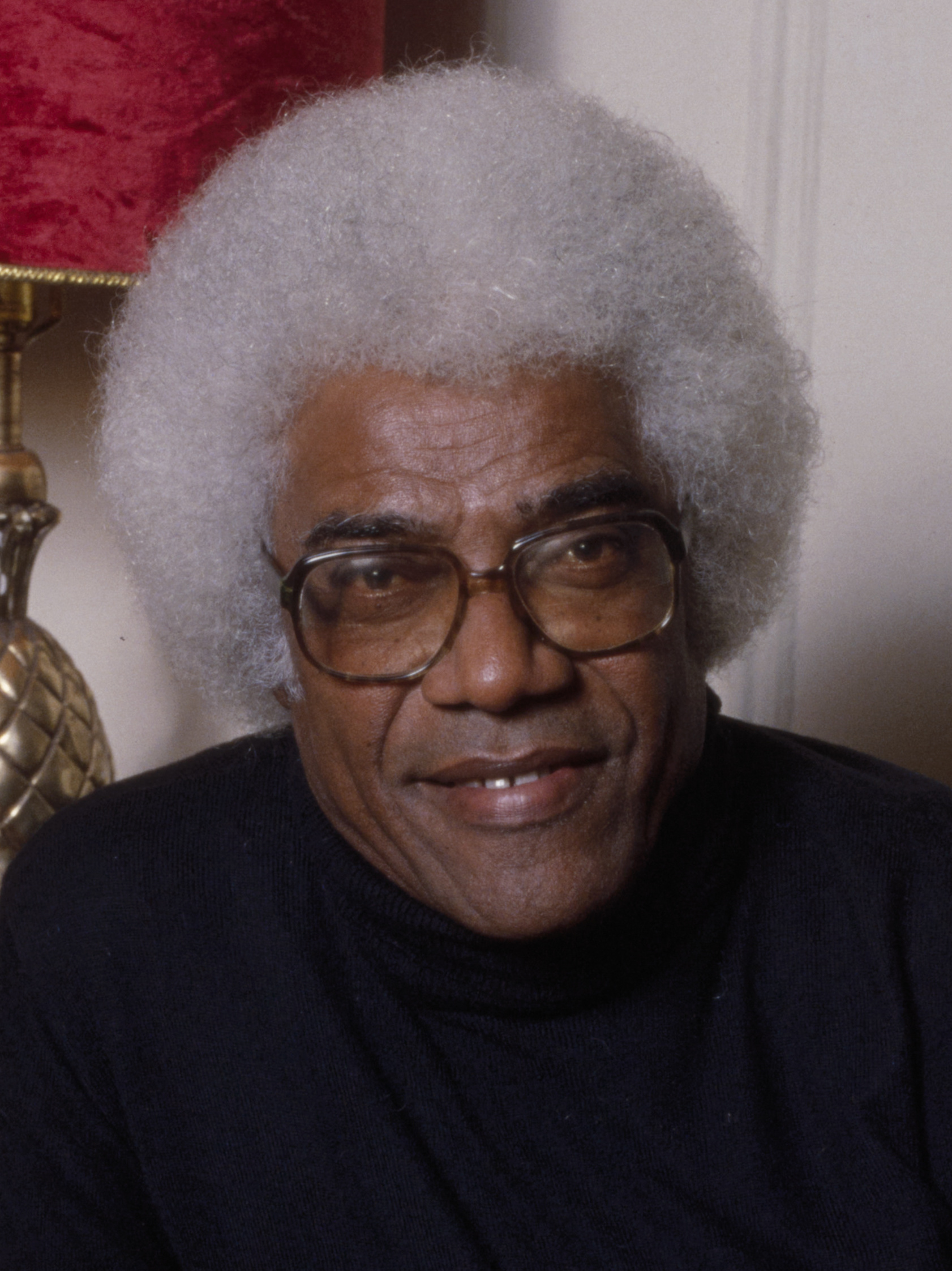
George Lamming

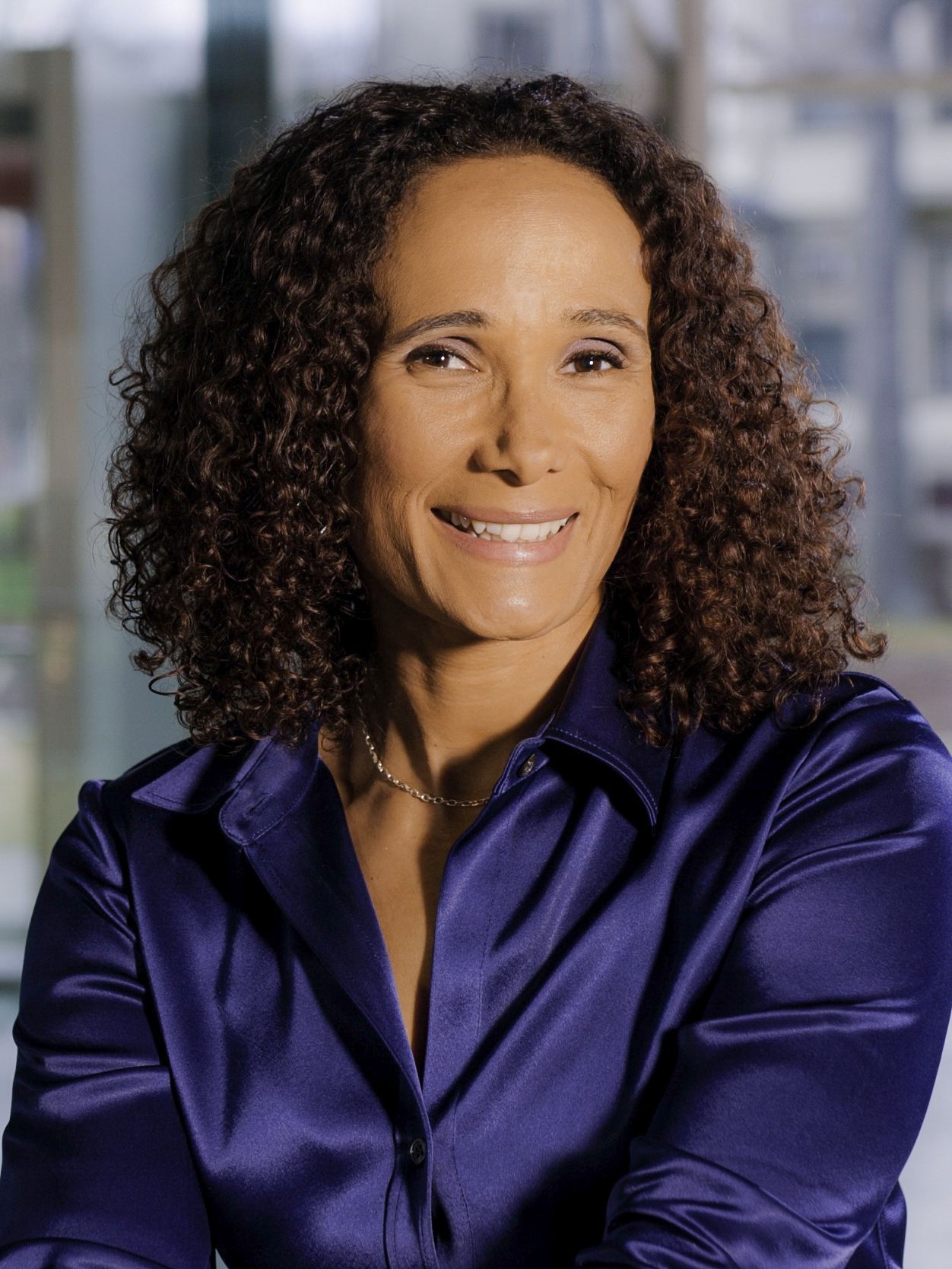
Tricia Rose

- Chinua Achebe – David and Marianna Fisher University Professor and professor of Africana Studies, Nigerian novelist, poet, and critic; author of Things Fall Apart, the most widely read book in modern African literature
- Ama Ata Aidoo – visiting professor of Africana Studies and Literary Arts (2004–2009); Ghanaian novelist and playwright, one of Africa's best-known female writers
- George Houston Bass – professor of Theater Arts and Afro-American Studies
- Keisha N. Blain – professor of Africana Studies and of History
- B. Anthony Bogues – Asa Messer Professor of Humanities and Critical Theory, professor of Africana Studies, director of the Center for the Study of Slavery and Justice, professor of History of Art and Architecture
- Michael Eric Dyson – assistant professor of American Civilization and Afro-American Studies (1993–1995)
- Lewis Gordon – professor of Africana Studies (1997–2004)
- Matthew Pratt Guterl – professor of Africana Studies and American Studies
- Wyclef Jean – visiting fellow in Africana Studies (2010–11)
- Ibram X. Kendi – visiting scholar and visiting assistant professor of Africana Studies (2013–2014)
- Adrienne Kennedy – visiting associate professor (1979–1980)
- George Lamming – visiting professor of Africana Studies and Literary Arts; Barbadian author, In the Castle of My Skin, Natives of My Person
- Judy Richardson – Distinguished Visiting Lecturer of Africana Studies
- Noliwe Rooks – L. Herbert Ballou University Professor of Africana Studies
- Tricia Rose (A.M. 1987, Ph.D. 1993) – Chancellor's Professor of Africana Studies, associate dean of the Faculty for Special Initiatives, director of the Center for the Study of Race and Ethnicity in America
- Greg Tate – visiting professor of Africana Studies (2012)
- John Edgar Wideman – Asa Messer Professor Emeritus of Africana Studies and Literary Arts; two-time PEN/Faulkner Award winner

=== English and literary arts ===
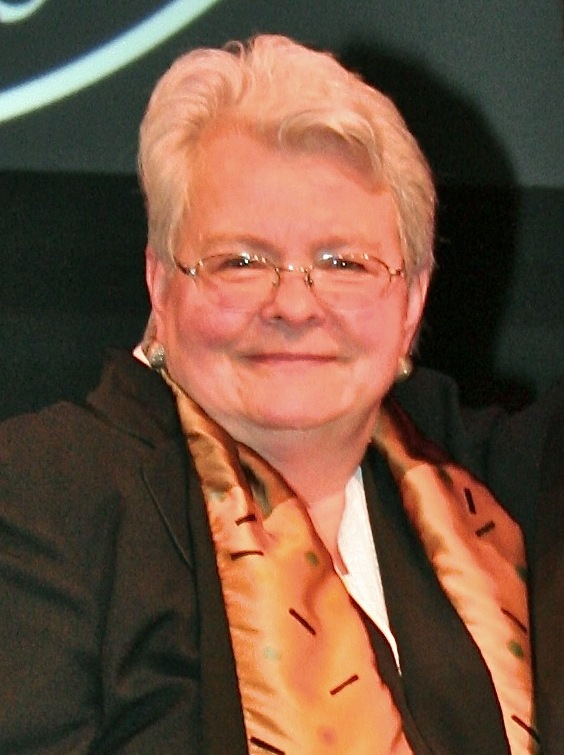
Paula Vogel in 2010

- Robert Coover – T.B. Stowell Professor Emeritus in Literary Arts (1981–2012)
- Robert Creeley – professor of English; poet associated with the Black Mountain poets
- Brian Evenson – professor of Literary Arts (2003–15)
- Forrest Gander – professor of English and Comparative Literature; recipient of the Pulitzer Prize
- Michael S. Harper – professor of English; first Poet Laureate of the state of Rhode Island
- John Hawkes – professor of English (1958–1988); author, The Blood Oranges, Second Skin
- Edwin Honig – professor of English and Comparative Literature (1957–1982)
- Michael Ondaatje – visiting professor (1990)
- Elizabeth Rush – assistant professor of the Practice, Nonfiction Writing Program; Pulitzer Prize nominee
- Barbara Herrnstein Smith – Distinguished Professor of English (2003–11)
- Paula Vogel – Adele Kellenberg Seaver ’49 Professor of Creative Writing (1984–2008); Pulitzer Prize–winning playwright
- Rosmarie Waldrop – visiting scholar of Literary Arts
- Arnold Weinstein – Edna and Richard Salomon Distinguished Professor of Comparative Literature
- C. D. Wright – Israel J. Kapstein Professor of English; MacArthur Fellow (2004)

=== History ===
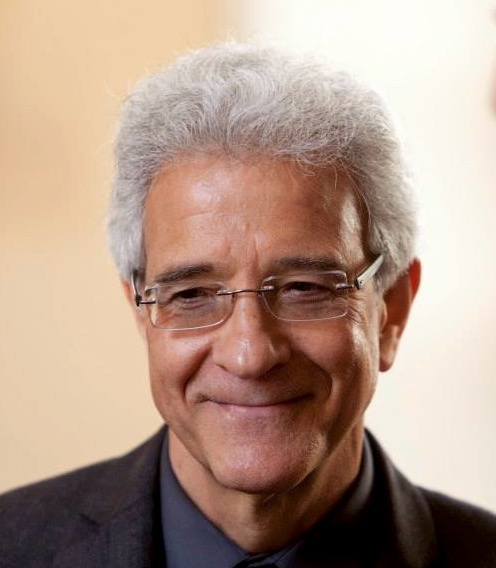
Omer Bartov

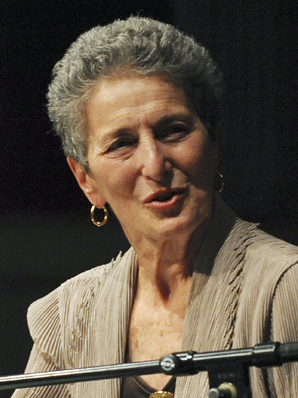
Natalie Zemon Davis

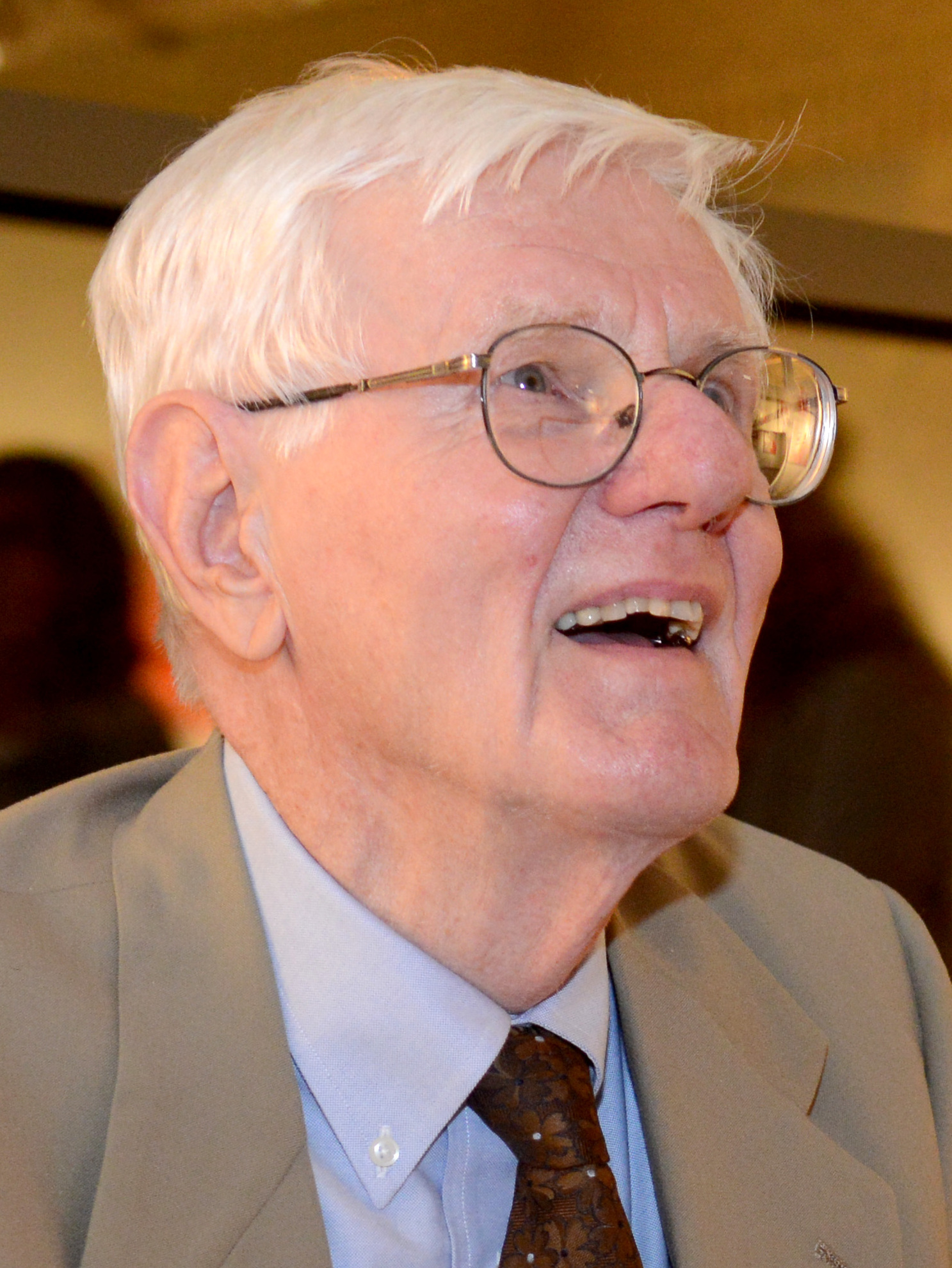
Gordon S. Wood

- Omer Bartov – Samuel Pisar Professor of Holocaust and Genocide Studies
- Paul Buhle – senior lecturer emeritus
- Richard Bushman – postdoctoral fellow in History and Psychology (1963–1965)
- James T. Campbell – professor of American Civilization, Africana Studies, and History (1999–2008)
- Deborah Cohen – professor of History (2002–10)
- Natalie Zemon Davis – assistant professor of History (1959–1963); recipient of the 2012 National Humanities Medal
- James N. Green – Carlos Manuel de Cespedes Professor of Modern Latin American History and Portuguese and Brazilian Studies
- Susan Ashbrook Harvey – Willard Prescott and Annie McClelland Smith Professor of History and Religion (1987–)
- David Herlihy – Barnaby Conrad and Mary Critchfield Keeney Professor and professor of History
- R. Ross Holloway – Elisha Benjamin Andrews Professor Emeritus and professor emeritus of Central Mediterranean Archaeology
- Evelyn Hu-DeHart – professor of History and professor of American Studies
- Forrest McDonald – professor of History (1959–1967)
- Edmund Morgan – associate professor of Colonial History (1946–1955)
- Tara Nummedal – John Nickoll Provost's Professor of History
- James T. Patterson – Ford Foundation Professor Emeritus and professor Emeritus of History (1972–2002); winner of the 1997 Bancroft Prize
- Joan Wallach Scott – founding director of the Pembroke Center, Nancy Duke Lewis University Professor (1981–1985)
- Morton Smith – assistant professor of Biblical Literature (1950–1955)
- John L. Thomas (Ph.D. 1961) – George L. Littlefield Professor of American History emeritus; winner of the 1964 Bancroft Prize
- Gordon S. Wood – Alva O. Way University Professor and professor of History; Pulitzer Prize for History winner, The Radicalism of the American Revolution
- Karin Wulf – professor of History, Beatrice and Julio Mario Santo Domingo Director and librarian of the John Carter Brown Library

=== Modern culture and media ===
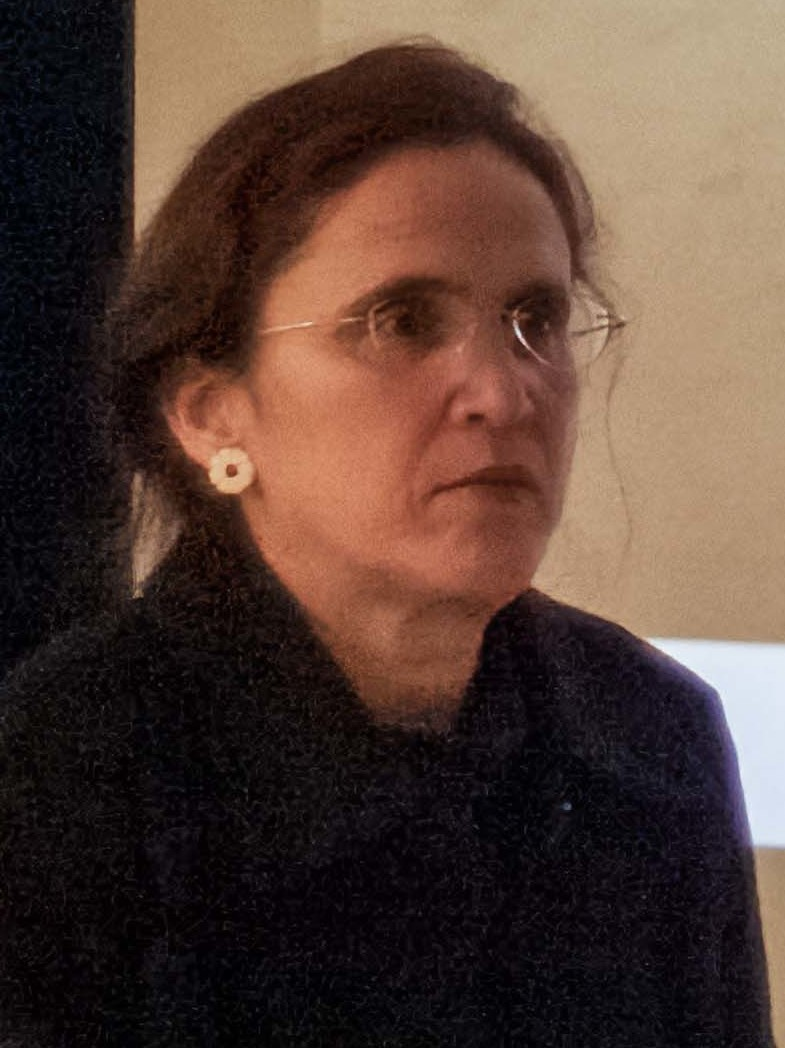
Ariella Azoulay

- Ariella Azoulay – professor of Comparative Literature and Modern Culture and Media
- Tina Campt – Owen F. Walker Professor of Humanities and professor of Modern Culture and Media
- Wendy Hui Kyong Chun – professor of Modern Culture and Media (2005–2018)
- Tony Cokes – professor of Modern Culture and Media
- Joan Copjec – professor of Modern Culture and Media
- Mary Ann Doane – George Hazard Crooker Professor of Modern Culture and Media
- Bonnie Honig – Nancy Duke Lewis Professor of Modern Culture and Media and Political Science
- Robert Scholes – research professor of Modern Culture and Media; president, Modern Language Association; author, The Rise and Fall of English; co-author, The Nature of Narrative
- Leslie Thornton – professor emerita of Modern Culture and Media

=== Philosophy ===
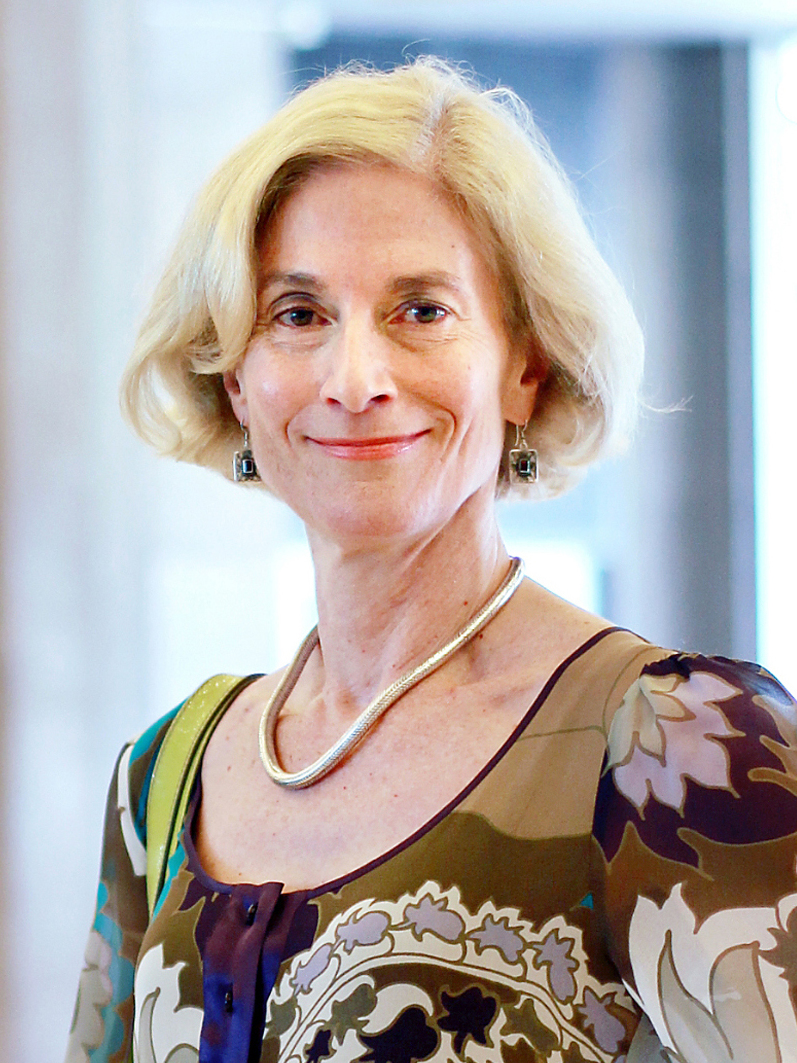
Martha Nussbaum

- Nomy Arpaly – professor of Philosophy
- Jason Brennan – assistant professor of Philosophy (2006–2011); author of Against Democracy
- Dan W. Brock – Charles C. Tillinghast, Jr. University Professor and professor emeritus of Philosophy (1969–2002)
- Roderick Chisholm (A.B. 1938) – Andrew W. Mellon Chair in the Humanities and professor of Philosophy
- David Christensen – professor of Philosophy
- James Dreier – Judy C. Lewent and Mark L. Shapiro Professor of Philosophy
- David Estlund – Lombardo Family Professor of Philosophy
- Joel Feinberg – assistant professor of Philosophy (1955–1957)
- Mary Louise Gill – David Benedict Professor of Classics and Philosophy
- Paul Guyer – Jonathan Nelson Professor of Humanities and Philosophy
- Christopher S. Hill – William Herbert Perry Faunce Professor of Philosophy
- Jaegwon Kim – William Herbert Perry Faunce Professor of Philosophy; philosopher of mind, action theorist
- Charles Larmore – W. Duncan MacMillan Family Professor of the Humanities and professor of Philosophy
- Felicia Nimue Ackerman – professor of Philosophy
- Martha Nussbaum – professor of Philosophy (1985–1995); philosopher, wrote The Fragility of Goodness while teaching at Brown
- Bernard Reginster – Romeo Elton Professor of Natural Theology
- Ernest Sosa – philosopher, epistemologist

== Natural sciences ==
=== Biology ===
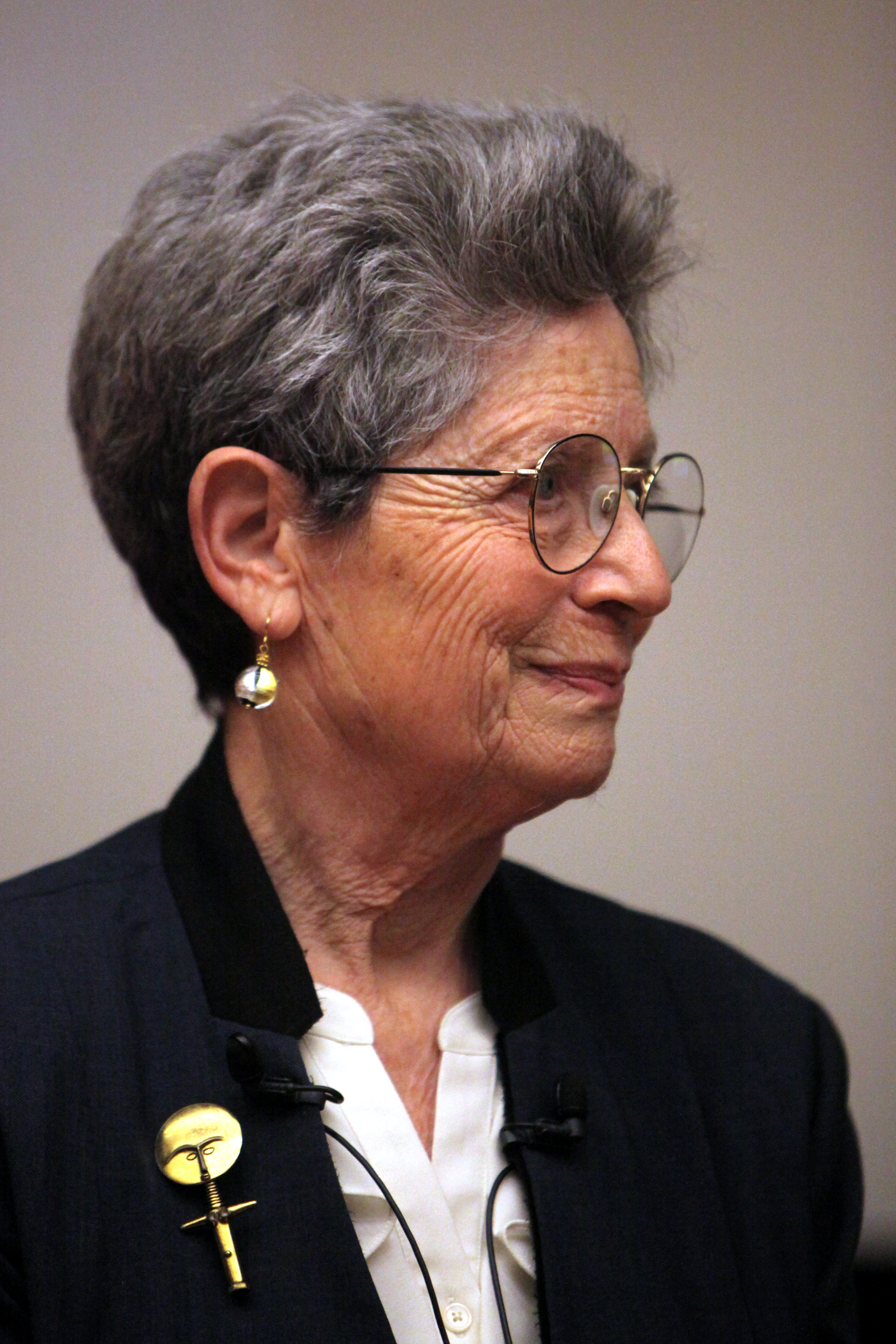
Anne Fausto-Sterling

- Elizabeth L. Brainerd – Robert P. Brown Professor of Biology and professor of Medical Science
- David E. Cane – Vernon K. Krieble Professor Emeritus of Chemistry and professor emeritus of Molecular Biology, Cell Biology, and Biochemistry
- Anne Fausto-Sterling (Ph.D. 1970) – Nancy Duke Lewis Professor Emerita of Biology
- Susan Gerbi – George D. Eggleston Professor Emerita of Biochemistry, professor of Molecular Biology, Cell Biology and Biochemistry (Research)
- Judy Liu – Sidney A. Fox and Dorothea Doctors Fox Associate Professor of Ophthalmology and Visual Science
- Kenneth R. Miller (Sc.B. 1970) – professor of Biology; supporter of evolution involved in numerous public debates and trials about the teaching of intelligent design in schools
- Masatoshi Nei – professor of Biology (1969–1972); recipient of the Kyoto Prize in Basic Sciences (2013)
- Wally Snell – assistant professor of Botany (1920–1921); associate professor of Botany (1921–1942); Stephen T. Olney Professor of Botany (1942–1945); athletic director (1943–1947); professor of Natural History (1945–1959)

==== Neuroscience ====
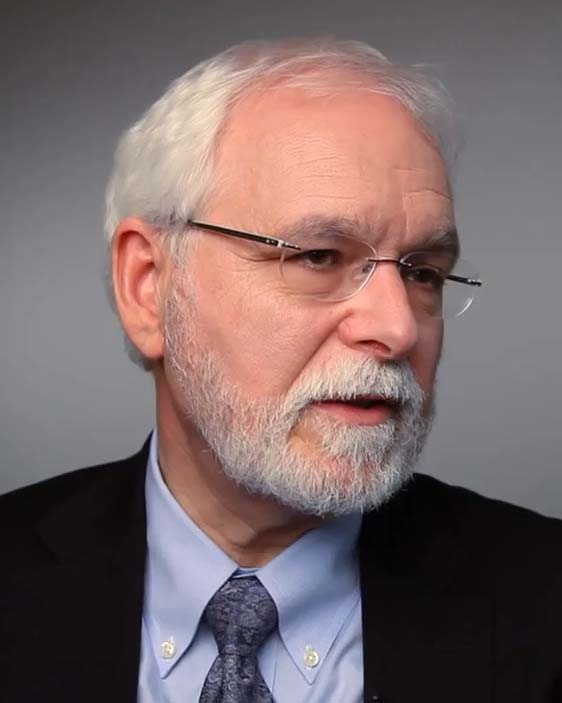
John Donoghue

- David Berson – Sidney A. Fox and Dorothea Doctors Fox Professor of Ophthalmology and Visual Science, discovered third photoreceptor in the eye (in addition to rods and cones)
- John Donoghue (Ph.D. 1979) – Henry Merritt Wriston Professor of Neuroscience, professor of Engineering
- Michael J. Frank – Edgar L. Marston Professor of Psychology, director of the Center for Computational Brain Science
- Leigh Hochberg (B.Sc. 1990) – L. Herbert Ballou University Professor of Engineering
- Karla Kaun (Ph.D. 2007) – associate professor of Neuroscience
- Diane Lipscombe – Thomas J. Watson, Sr. Professor of Science, professor of Neuroscience, Reliance Dhirubhai Ambani Director of the Robert J. and Nancy D. Carney Institute for Brain Science
- Christopher I. Moore – professor of Neuroscience
- Michael Paradiso (Ph.D. 1984) – Sidney A. Fox and Dorothea Doctors Fox Professor of Ophthalmology and Visual Science and professor of Neuroscience

=== Chemistry ===
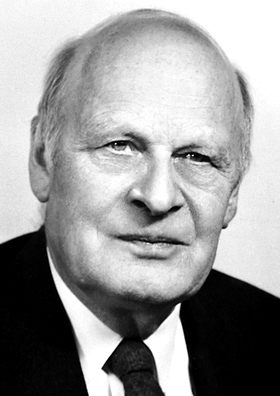
Lars Onsager

- Chris Abell FRS – SERC NATO postdoctoral fellow in Chemistry (1982–1983)
- David E. Cane – Vernon K. Krieble Professor of Chemistry (1973–)
- Raymond Fuoss – assistant professor of Chemistry (1932–1936)
- Charles A. Kraus – professor of Chemistry (1924–1946); consultant for the Manhattan Project, recipient of the Priestley Medal and Franklin Medal
- Lars Onsager – research instructor in Chemistry (1928–1933); Nobel laureate (Chemistry 1968), for discovering Onsager reciprocal relations
- John Ross – assistant professor of Chemistry (1953–1965)
- Richard Stratt – Newport Rogers Professor of Chemistry (1981–)
- Lai-Sheng Wang – Jesse H. and Louisa D. Sharpe Metcalf Professor; chemist

=== Cognitive and psychological sciences ===
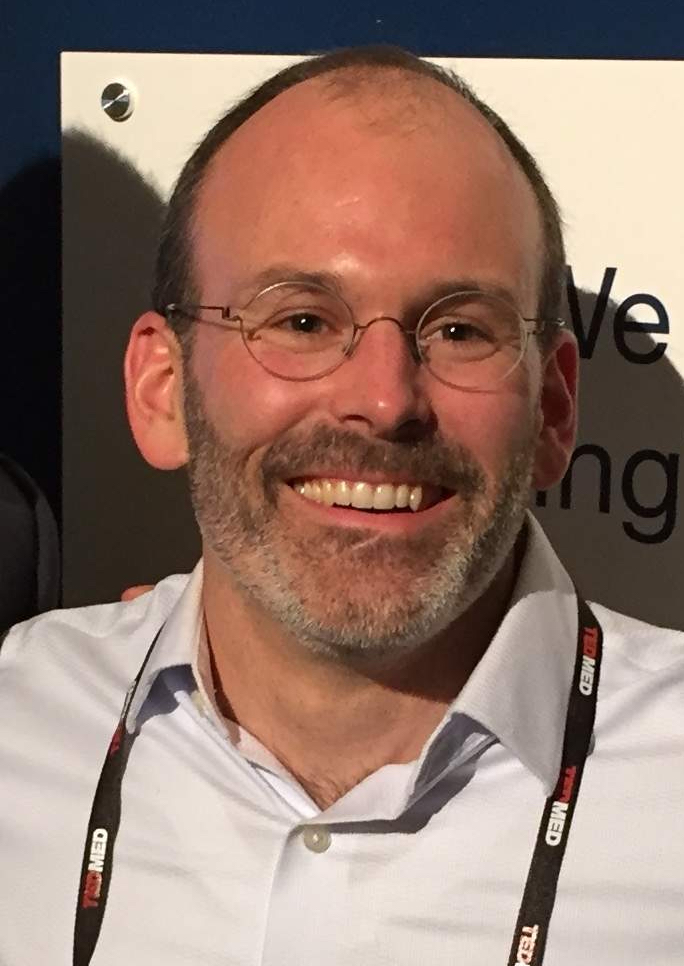
Judson A. Brewer

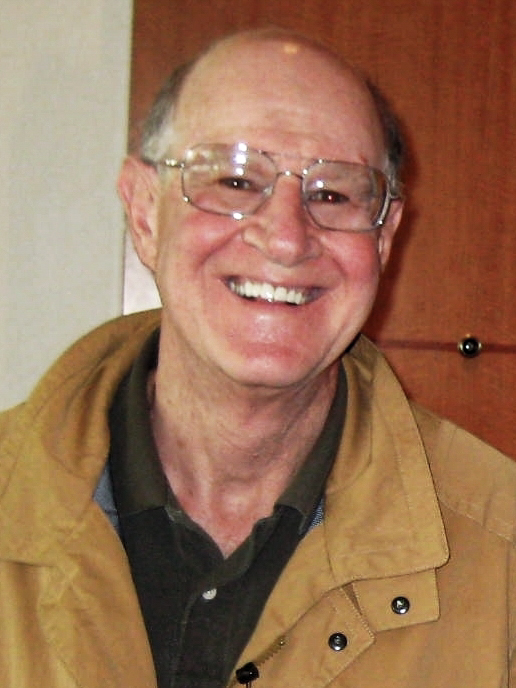
William Damon

- Sheila Blumstein – Albert D. Mead Professor of Cognitive, Linguistic and Psychological Sciences
- Judson A. Brewer – director of Research and Innovation at the Mindfulness Center, and professor of Behavioral and Social Sciences
- Mary Carskadon – adjunct professor of Cognitive, Linguistic and Psychological Sciences
- Russell Church – Edgar L. Marston Professor Emeritus of Psychology
- William Damon – professor of Education (1989–1997)
- Philip Lieberman – George Hazard Crooker University Professor Emeritus
- Jeffrey Moussaieff Masson – author and psychoanalyst
- William H. Warren – Chancellor's Professor of Cognitive, Linguistic and Psychological Sciences

=== Earth sciences ===
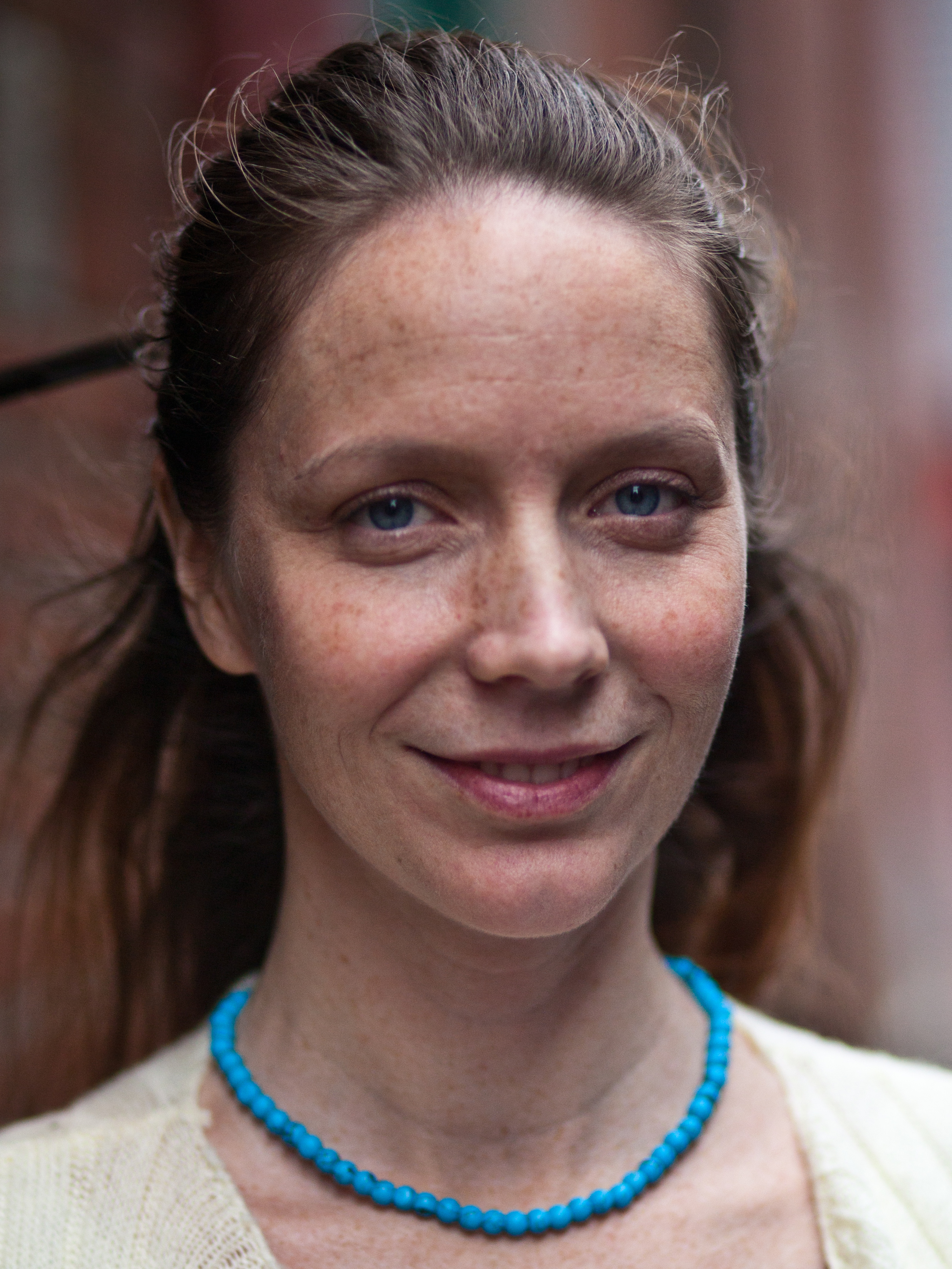
Kim Cobb

- Kim Cobb – professor of Environment and Society and professor of Earth, Environmental and Planetary Sciences
- Karen M. Fischer – Louis and Elizabeth Scherck Distinguished Professor of the Geological Sciences
- Meredith G. Hastings – professor of Environment and Society and Earth, Environmental and Planetary Sciences
- James W. Head (Ph.D. 1969) – Louis and Elizabeth Scherck Distinguished Professor Emeritus of the Geological Sciences
- Timothy D. Herbert – Henry L. Doherty Professor of Oceanography, professor of Earth, Environmental, and Planetary Sciences
- John Imbrie – professor emeritus of Geological Sciences
- Amanda Lynch – Sloan Lindemann and George Lindemann, Jr. Distinguished Professor of Environment and Society and professor of Earth, Environmental and Planetary Sciences
- James M. Russell – chair of Earth, Environmental, and Planetary Sciences
- Peter H. Schultz – professor emeritus of Geological Sciences, professor of Earth, Environmental, and Planetary Sciences

=== Medicine and public health ===
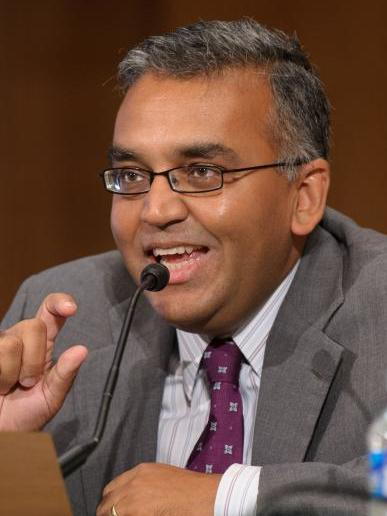
Ashish Jha

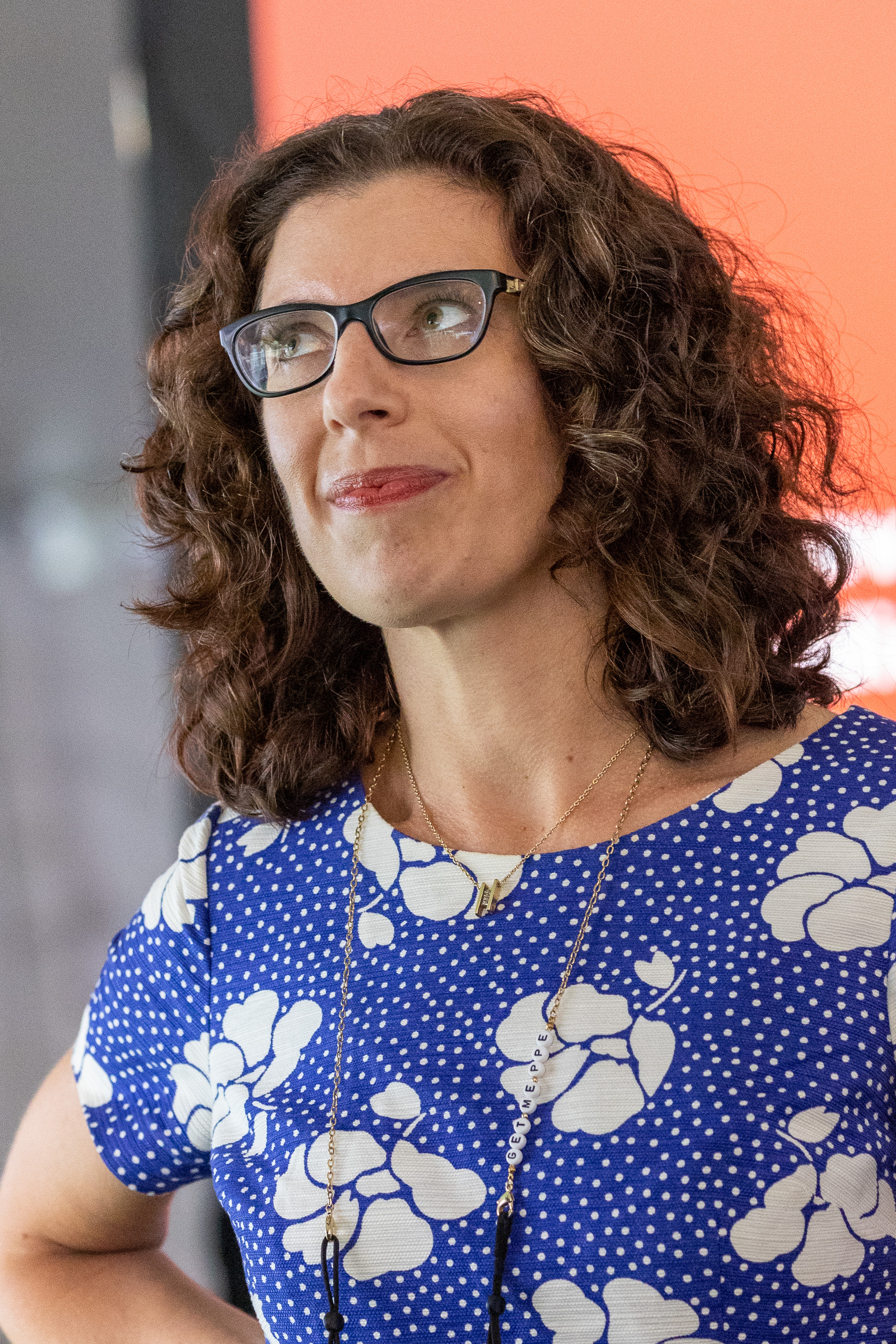
Megan Ranney

- Eli Y. Adashi – professor of Medical Science, 5th dean of Medicine and Biological Sciences
- Patrick Aebischer – associate professor of Medical Sciences (1984–1992); president emeritus of the École Polytechnique Fédérale de Lausanne
- Qian Chen – chair professor in Orthopaedic Research
- Esther Choo – adjunct associate professor of Emergency Medicine
- Lorin Crawford – RGSS Assistant Professor of Biostatistics
- David F. Duncan – clinical associate professor of Medicine; epidemiologist and addictionologist
- Damian E. Dupuy – professor of Diagnostic Imaging
- Alison Field – professor of Epidemiology
- Constantine Gatsonis – Henry Ledyard Goddard University Professor of Biostatistics
- Mukesh Jain – dean of Biological Sciences, dean of Medicine at the Warren Alpert Medical School, Frank L. Day Professor of Biology
- Ashish Jha – 3rd dean of the School of Public Health, professor of Health Services, Policy and Practice (2020–2025)
- Peter D. Kramer – clinical professor of Psychiatry and Human Behavior; author, Listening to Prozac, Against Depression
- Bess Marcus – 2nd dean of the School of Public Health (2017–2020), professor of Behavioral and Social Sciences
- Jennifer Nuzzo – professor of Epidemiology
- Megan Ranney (M.P.H. 2010) – Warren Alpert Endowed Professor of Department of Emergency Medicine and academic dean of the School of Public Health (2008–2023)
- Christopher H. Schmid – professor of Biostatistics
- Peter A. Stewart – professor of Medical Science
- Benjamin Waterhouse – professor of Natural History (1784–1791); co-founder of Harvard Medical School, first doctor to test the smallpox vaccine in the United States

=== Physics ===
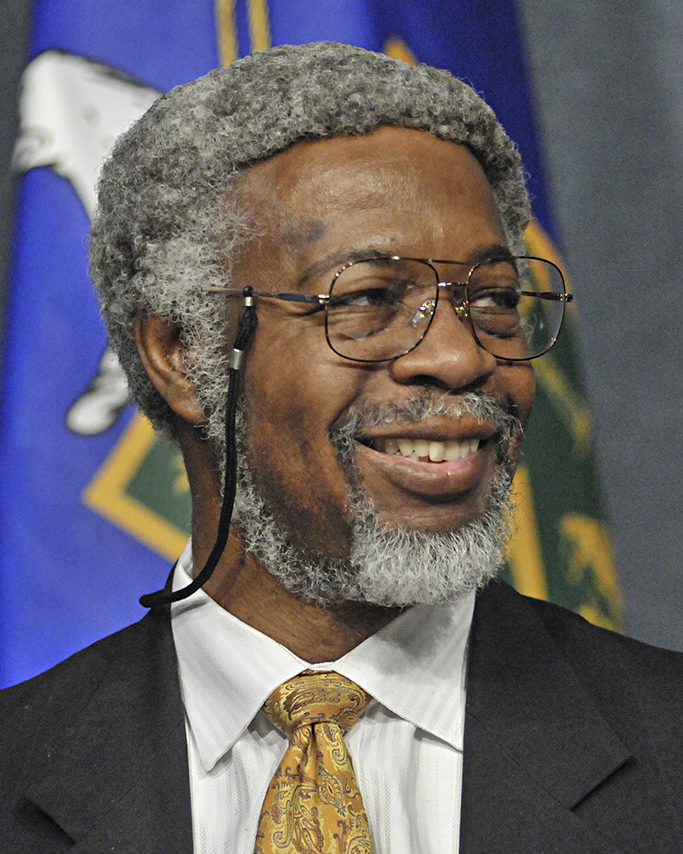
Sylvester James Gates

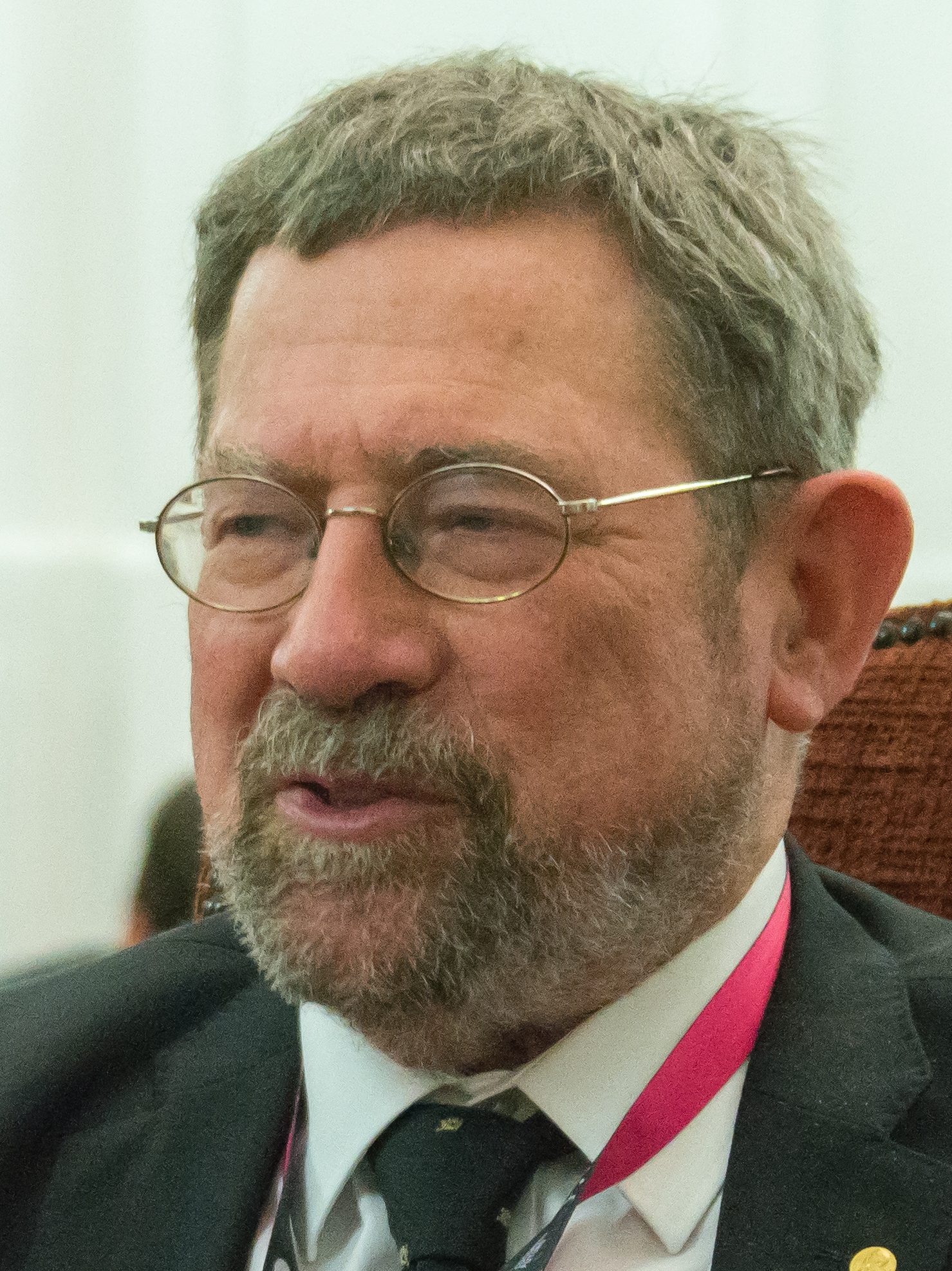
John M. Kosterlitz

- Stephon Alexander (Sc.M. 1995, Sc.M. 1996, Ph.D. 2000) – professor of Physics
- Carl Barus – Hazard Professor of Physics (1895–1926)
- Léon Brillouin – professor of Physics (1942–1943); founder of modern solid state physics
- Manuel Cardona – associate professor of Physics (1964–1971); one of the eight most cited physicists since 1970
- Leon Neil Cooper – Thomas J. Watson, Sr. Professor of Physics; Nobel laureate (Physics, 1972), father of superconductivity, and developer of the BCM theory of synaptic plasticity in neuroscience
- Richard Gaitskell – Hazard Professor of Physics, director of the Center for Fundamental Physics
- Sylvester James Gates – Ford Foundation Professor of Physics; physicist specializing in superstring theory
- Gerald Guralnik – Chancellor's Professor of Physics; co-discoverer of the Higgs mechanism, Sakurai Prize winner
- Leo Kadanoff – professor of Physics (1969–1978); recipient of the National Medal of Science
- John M. Kosterlitz – Harrison E. Farnsworth Professor of Physics (1982–); Nobel laureate (2016, Physics)
- Robert Lanou – professor of physics
- Robert Bruce Lindsay (A.B., Sc.M. 1920) – Hazard Professor of Physics; recipient of the ASA Gold Medal
- Vesna F. Mitrović – L. Herbert Ballou University Professor of Physics & Professor of Engineering
- Sidney R. Nagel – research associate (1974–1976)
- Meenakshi Narain – professor of Physics
- Nicholas Read FRS – research fellow (1985–1986)
- John Lighton Synge FRS – visiting professor (1941)
- Anastasia Volovich – professor of Physics

== Formal sciences ==
=== Computer science ===
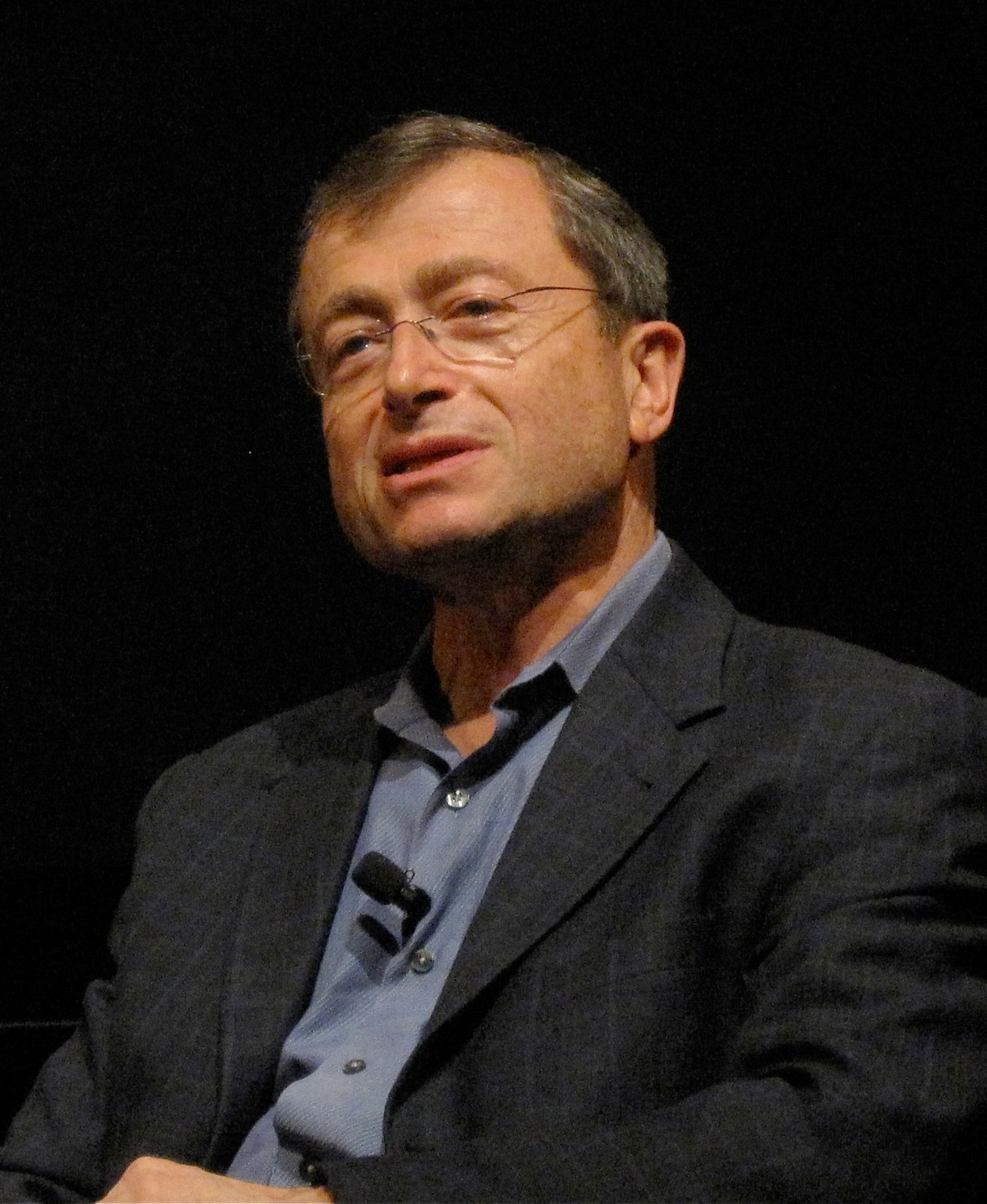
Andries van Dam

- R. Iris Bahar – professor of Computer Science
- Eugene Charniak – university professor emeritus of Computer Science (1978–)
- Thomas Dean – professor emeritus of Computer Science
- Maurice Herlihy – An Wang Professor of Computer Science
- John F. Hughes – associate chair of Computer Science
- Leslie P. Kaelbling – professor of Computer Science (1991–1999)
- Shriram Krishnamurthi – professor of Computer Science
- David Laidlaw (B.Sc. 1983) – professor of Computer Science
- Michael L. Littman (Ph.D. 1996) – university professor of Computer Science
- Franco P. Preparata – An Wang Professor of Computer Science Emeritus
- John E. Savage – An Wang Professor Emeritus of Computer Science (2011–)
- Robert Sedgewick (Sc.B. 1968, Sc.M. 1970) – professor of Computer Science (1975–1985)
- Roberto Tamassia – Plastech Professor of Computer Science
- Eli Upfal – Rush Hawkins Professor of Computer Science
- Andries van Dam – Thomas J. Watson Jr. University Professor of Technology and Education and professor of Computer Science, vice president for Research (2002–2006); computer graphics and hypertext pioneer
- Jeffrey Vitter – professor of Computer Science (1980–1992); 17th chancellor of the University of Mississippi
- Peter Wegner – professor emeritus of Computer Science
- Stanley Zdonik – professor of Computer Science

=== Mathematics ===
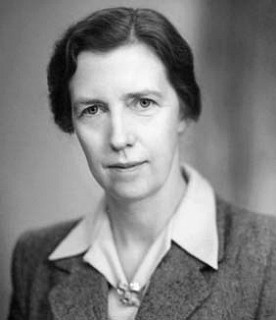
Mary Cartwright

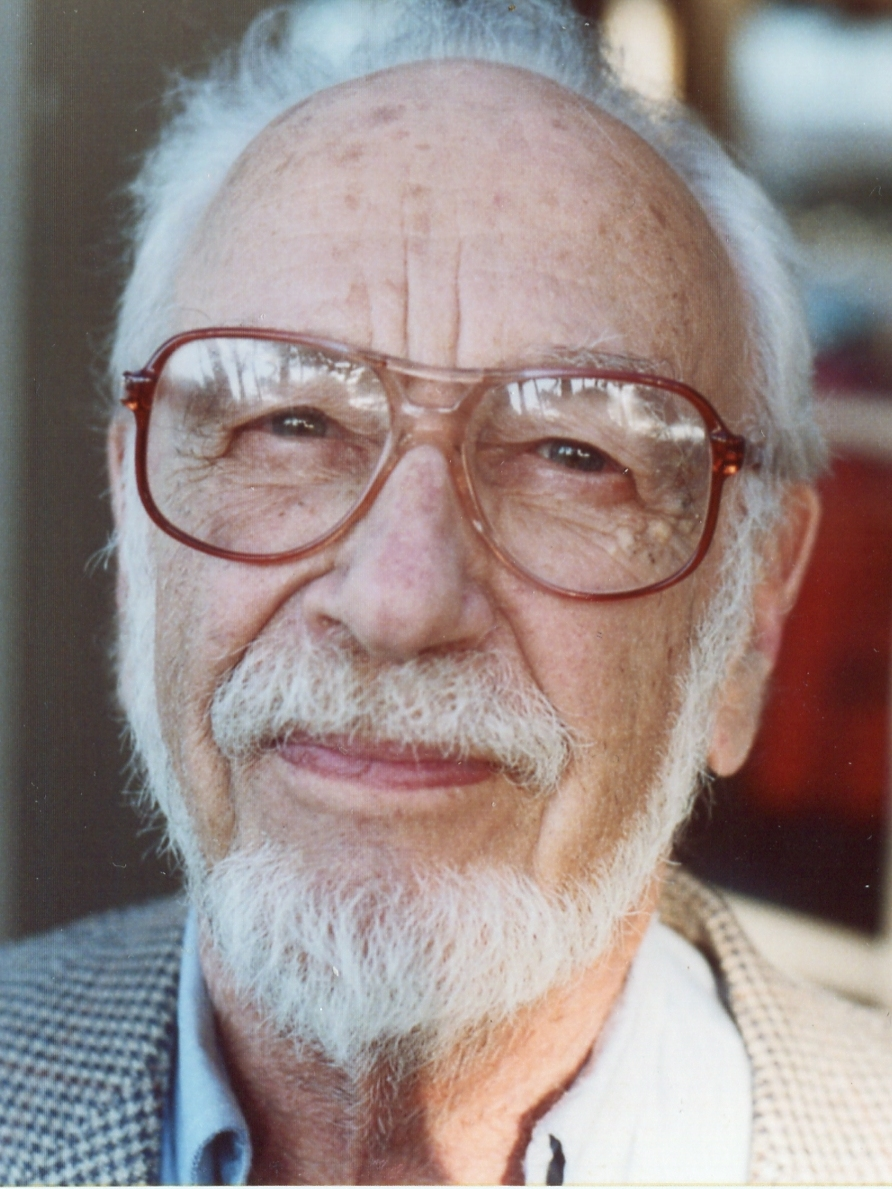
David Gale

- Dan Abramovich – L. Herbert Ballou University Professor of Mathematics
- Thomas Banchoff – professor emeritus of Mathematics
- Mary Cartwright FRS – visiting professor (1968–1969)
- Herbert Federer – Florence Pirce Grant University Professor (1945–1985)
- William Feller – associate professor (1939–1945); mathematician of probability theory, winner of the National Medal of Science
- David Gale – professor of Mathematics (1950–1965)
- Ulf Grenander – L. Herbert Ballou University Professor, originator of pattern theory
- Richard Kenyon – William R. Kenan Jr. University Professor of Mathematics (2007–1019)
- Hans Lewy – research associate (1933–1935)
- Marston Morse – associate professor of Mathematics (1925–1926); namesake of Morse theory
- Katsumi Nomizu – professor of Mathematics (1960–1995); co-author of Foundations of Differential Geometry (1963, 1969)
- Jill Pipher – Elisha Benjamin Andrews Professor of Mathematics; first director of ICERM
- George Pólya – visiting professor (1940–1942)
- Richard Schwartz – Chancellor's Professor of Mathematics
- Walter A. Strauss – L. Herbert Ballou University Professor of Mathematics
- Jacob Tamarkin – professor of Mathematics (1927–1945)

==== Applied mathematics ====
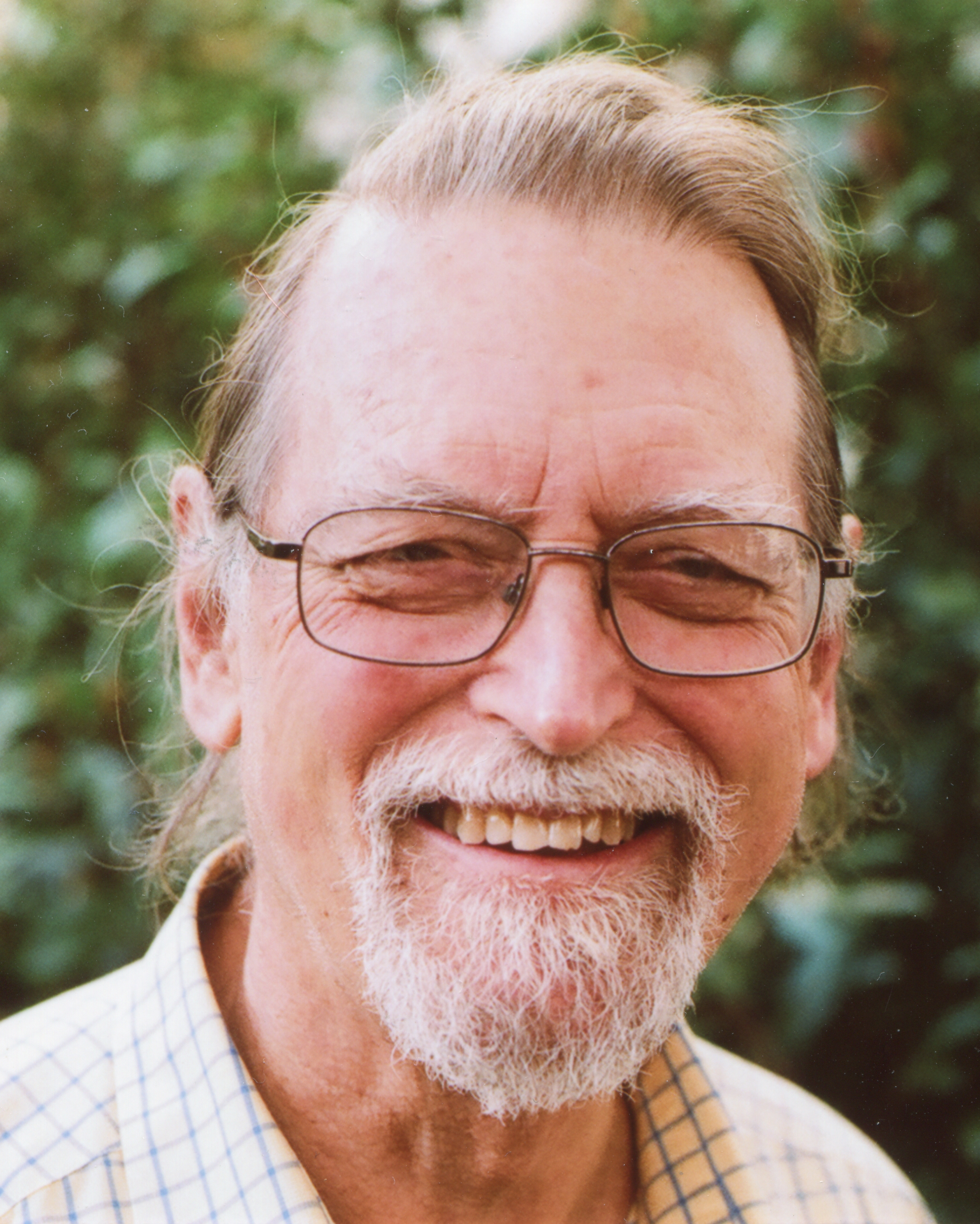
David Mumford

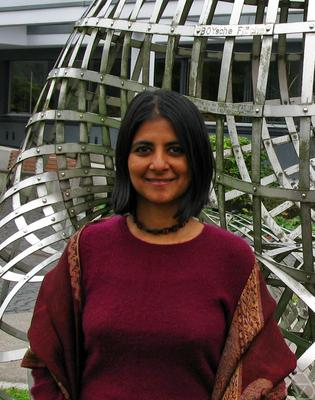
Kavita Ramanan

- Maurice Anthony Biot – professor of Applied Mathematics (1946–1952); recipient of the Timoshenko Medal
- George F. Carrier – professor of Applied Mathematics (1941–1948); recipient of the Timoshenko Medal
- Carlos Castillo-Chavez – Provost Visiting Professor of Applied Mathematics
- Constantine Dafermos – Alumni-Alumnae University Professor of Applied Mathematics
- Philip J. Davis – professor emeritus of Applied Mathematics; co-author of The Mathematical Experience
- Daniel C. Drucker – professor of Applied Mathematics and of Engineering (1946–1968); recipient of the Timoshenko Medal, National Medal of Science, ASME Medal
- Wendell Fleming – University Professor Emeritus and professor emeritus of Applied Mathematics and Mathematics
- Huajian Gao – Walter H. Annenberg Professor Emeritus of Engineering (2005–)
- Stuart Geman – James Manning Professor of Applied Mathematics
- David Gottlieb – Ford Foundation Professor of Applied Mathematics
- Albert E. Green – visiting professor; recipient of the Timoshenko Medal
- George Karniadakis – James Manning Professor of Applied Mathematics
- Harold J. Kushner – L. Herbert Ballou University Professor Emeritus of Applied Mathematics and Engineering
- Solomon Lefschetz – visiting professor of Applied Mathematics (1964–1968)
- Chia-Chiao Lin – associate professor of Applied Mathematics (1945–1947); recipient of the Timoshenko Medal
- David Mumford – professor emeritus of Applied Mathematics, recipient of the Fields Medal, MacArthur Fellow
- Alan Needleman – professor emeritus of Engineering; recipient of the Timoshenko Medal
- William Prager – professor of Applied Mathematics; recipient of the Timoshenko Medal
- Kavita Ramanan (M.Sc. 1993, Ph.D. 1998) – Roland George Dwight Richardson University Professor of Applied Mathematics
- James R. Rice – L. Herbert Ballou Professor of Theoretical and Applied Mechanics (1964–1981); recipient of the Timoshenko Medal
- Ronald Rivlin – professor of Applied Mathematics (1953–1967); recipient of the Timoshenko Medal
- Björn Sandstede – Alumni-Alumnae University Professor of Applied Mathematics
- Chi-Wang Shu – Theodore B. Stowell University Professor of Applied Mathematics
- Lawrence Sirovich – professor of Applied Mathematics (1963–1995)
- Eli Sternberg – professor of Applied Mathematics; recipient of the Timoshenko Medal

== Social sciences ==
- Lina Fruzzetti – professor of Anthropology
- David Kertzer (A.B. 1969) – Paul Dupee University Professor of Social Science; recipient of the Pulitzer Prize
- Theodore R. Sizer – Professor and chair of Education (1983–1997)

=== Political science and international studies ===
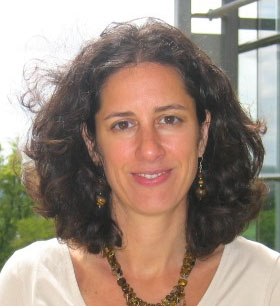
Nadje Sadig Al-Ali

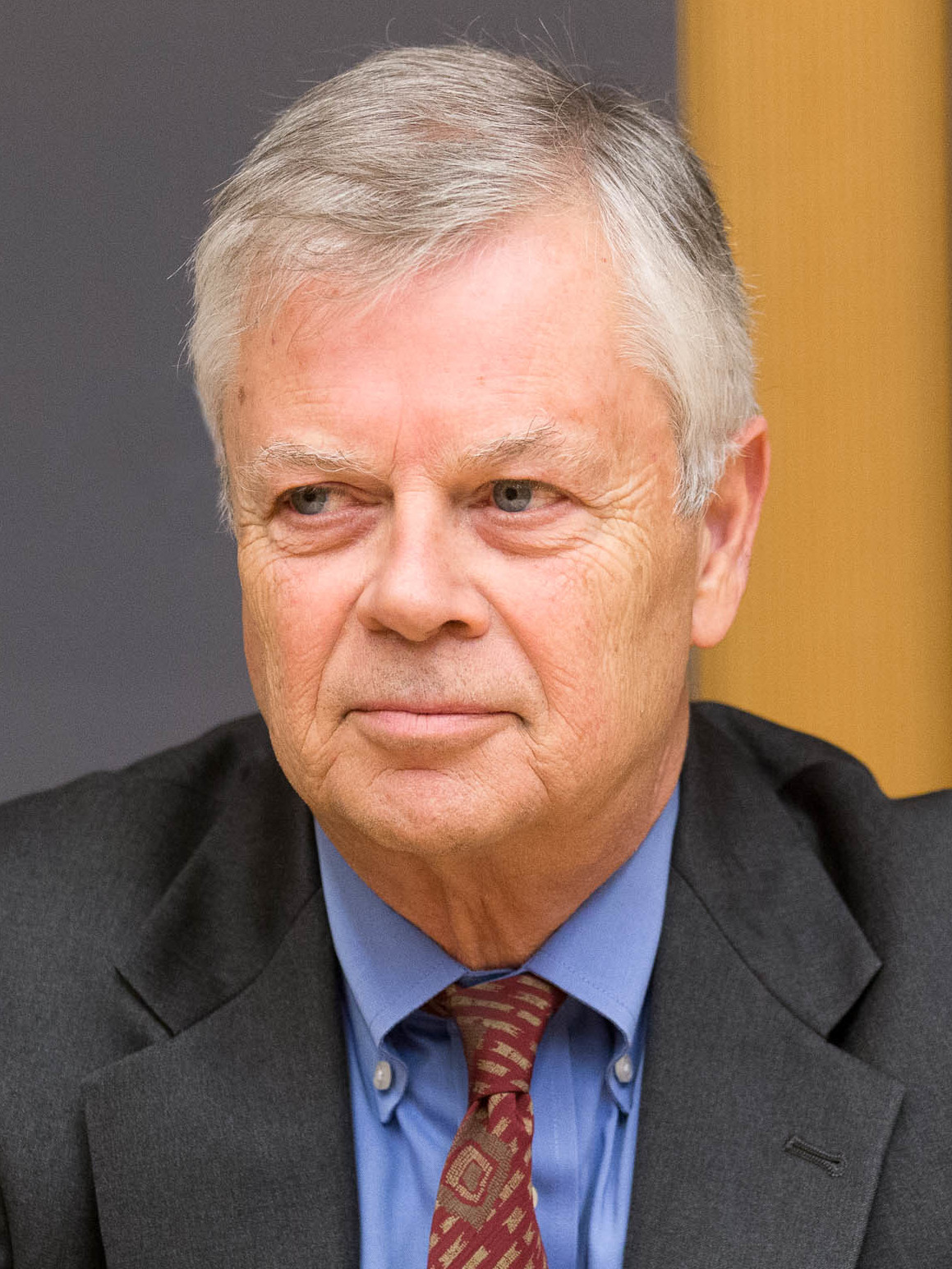
Stephen Kinzer

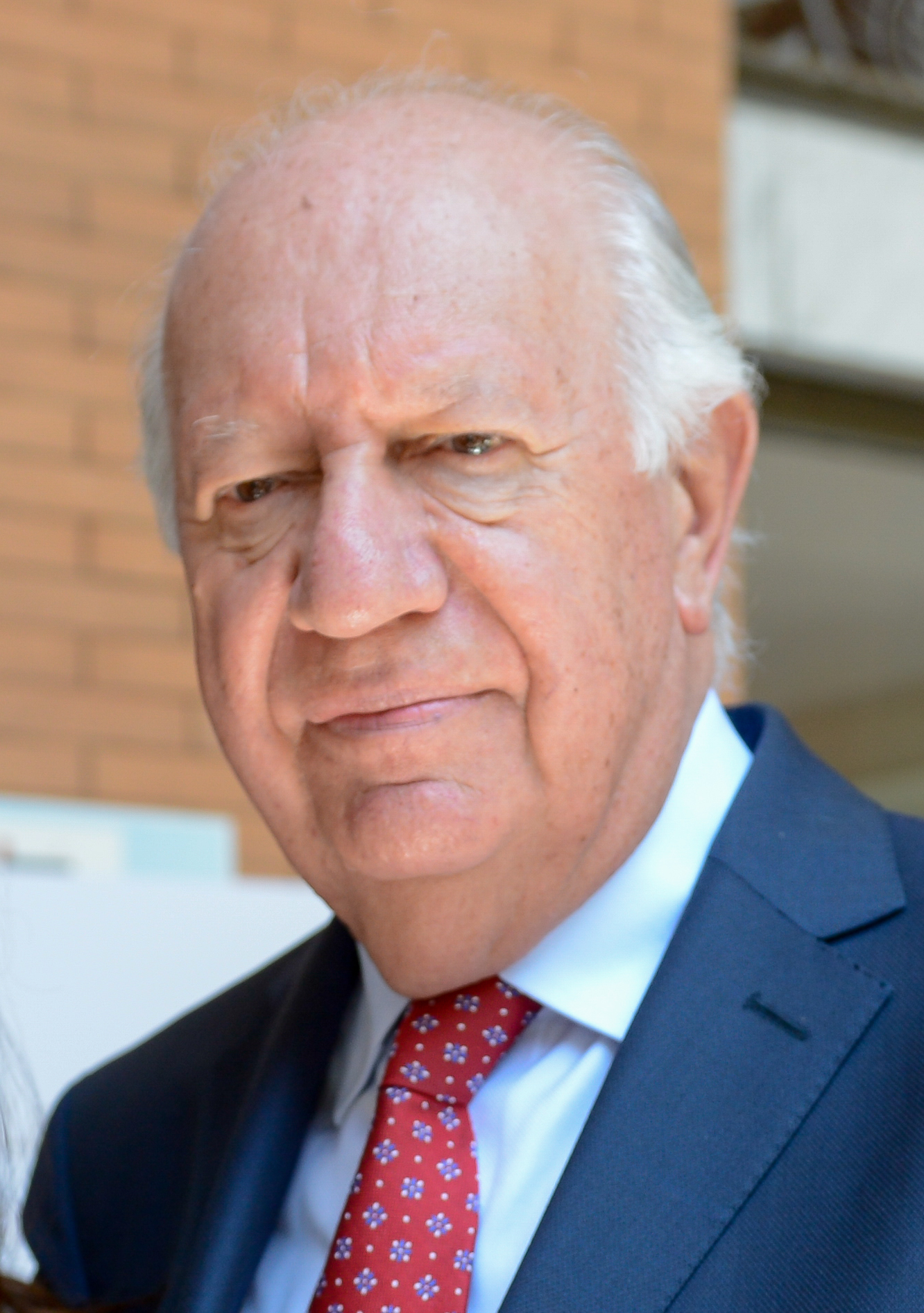
Ricardo Lagos

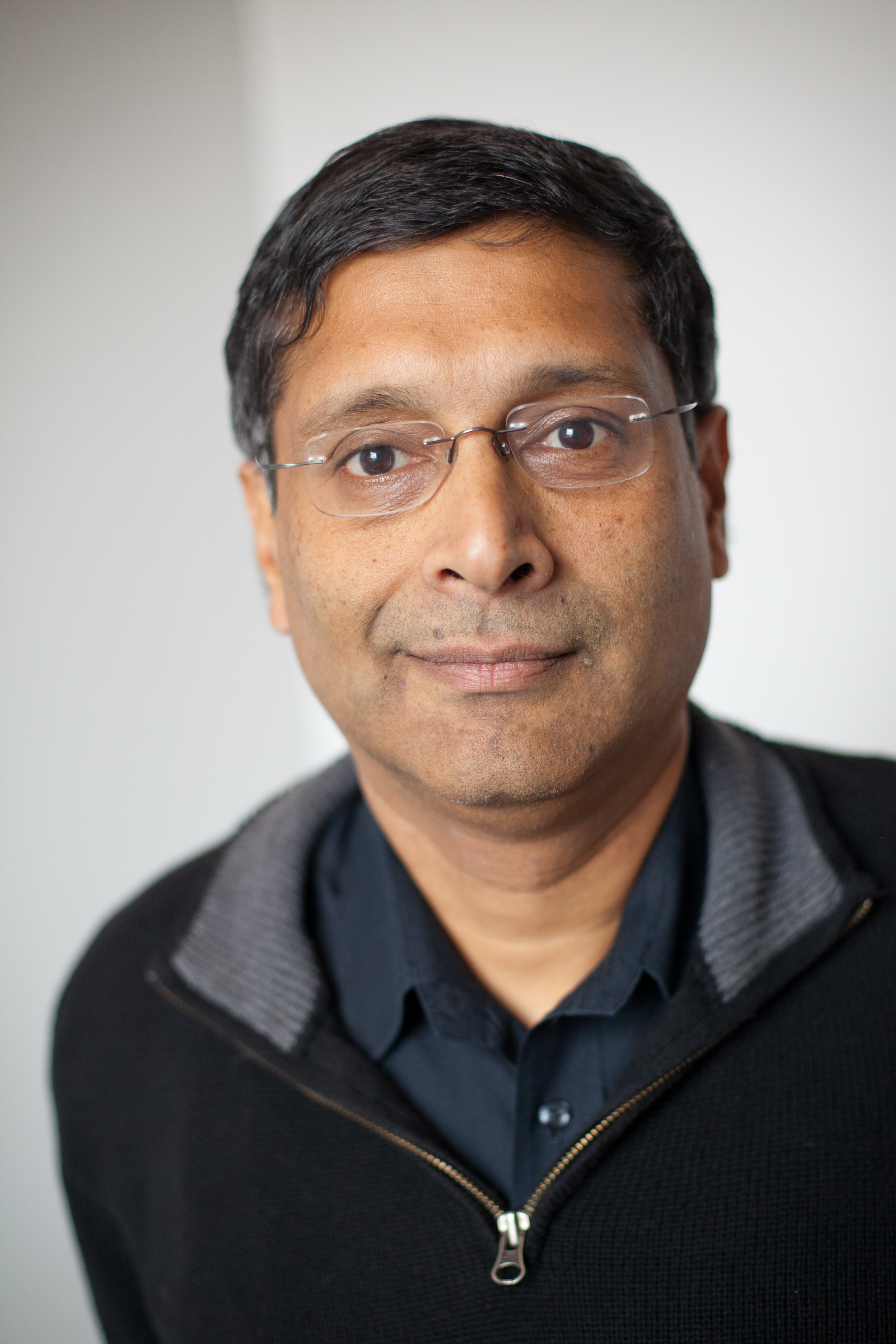
Arvind Subramanian

- Nadje Sadig Al-Ali – Robert Family Professor of International Studies and professor of Anthropology and Middle East Studies
- J. Brian Atwood – visiting scholar in International and Public Affairs
- Thomas J. Biersteker – director of the Watson Institute for International Studies and Henry R. Luce Professor of Transnational Organizations (1992–2006)
- Richard Boucher – senior fellow in International and Public Affairs; former deputy secretary-general of the OECD
- Fernando Henrique Cardoso – professor-at-large of International Studies; 34th president of Brazil
- Lincoln Chafee (A.B. 1975) – Distinguished Visiting Fellow in International Relations; former Republican member of the United States Senate
- Ross Cheit – professor of Political Science and of International and Public Affairs
- James Der Derian – Institute Research Professor of International Studies
- Patrick Heller – professor of Sociology and International and Public Affairs
- Richard Holbrooke (A.B. 1962) – professor-at-large; U.S. special representative for Afghanistan and Pakistan, 22nd U.S. ambassador to the U.N.; U.S. ambassador to Germany
- Sergei Khrushchev – senior fellow in International Studies; son of Nikita Sergeyevich Khrushchev
- Jim Yong Kim (A.B. 1981) – senior fellow in International and Public Affairs; 17th president, Dartmouth College, 12th president of the World Bank
- Stephen Kinzer – senior fellow in International and Public Affairs at the Watson Institute for International and Public Affairs
- Ricardo Lagos – professor-at-large of International Studies; 31st president of Chile
- Richard M. Locke – 13th provost (2015–2022) and Schreiber Family Professor of Political Science and International and Public Affairs (2018–2022)
- Catherine Lutz – Thomas J. Watson, Jr. Family Professor of Anthropology and International Studies
- Rose McDermott – David and Marianna Fisher University Professor of International Relations
- James Morone – John Hazen White Professor of Public Policy
- Eric M. Patashnik – Julis-Rabinowitz Professor of Public Policy
- Tom Perez (A.B. 1983) – senior fellow in International and Public Affairs
- Romano Prodi – adjunct professor of International and Public Affairs; 10th president of the European Commission and two-time prime minister of Italy
- Nancy L. Rosenblum – professor of Political Science (1980–2001), Henry Merritt Wriston Professor (1997–2001)
- Galina Starovoitova – Watson Distinguished Visiting Professor 1994–1998; member of Russian Duma; leader of reformist Democratic Russia party; assassinated November 20, 1998
- Michael Steele – senior fellow in International and Public Affairs; seventh lieutenant governor of Maryland
- Edward Steinfeld – Dean's Professor of China Studies and professor of Political Science
- Arvind Subramanian – senior fellow in International and Public Affairs; chief economic advisor to the Government of India (2014–2018)
- J. Ann Tickner – visiting scholar (1997); visiting adjunct professor (2004–2009)
- Ashutosh Varshney – Sol Goldman Professor of International Studies and the Social Sciences
- Margaret Weir – Wilson Professor of International and Public Affairs and Political Science

=== Economics ===
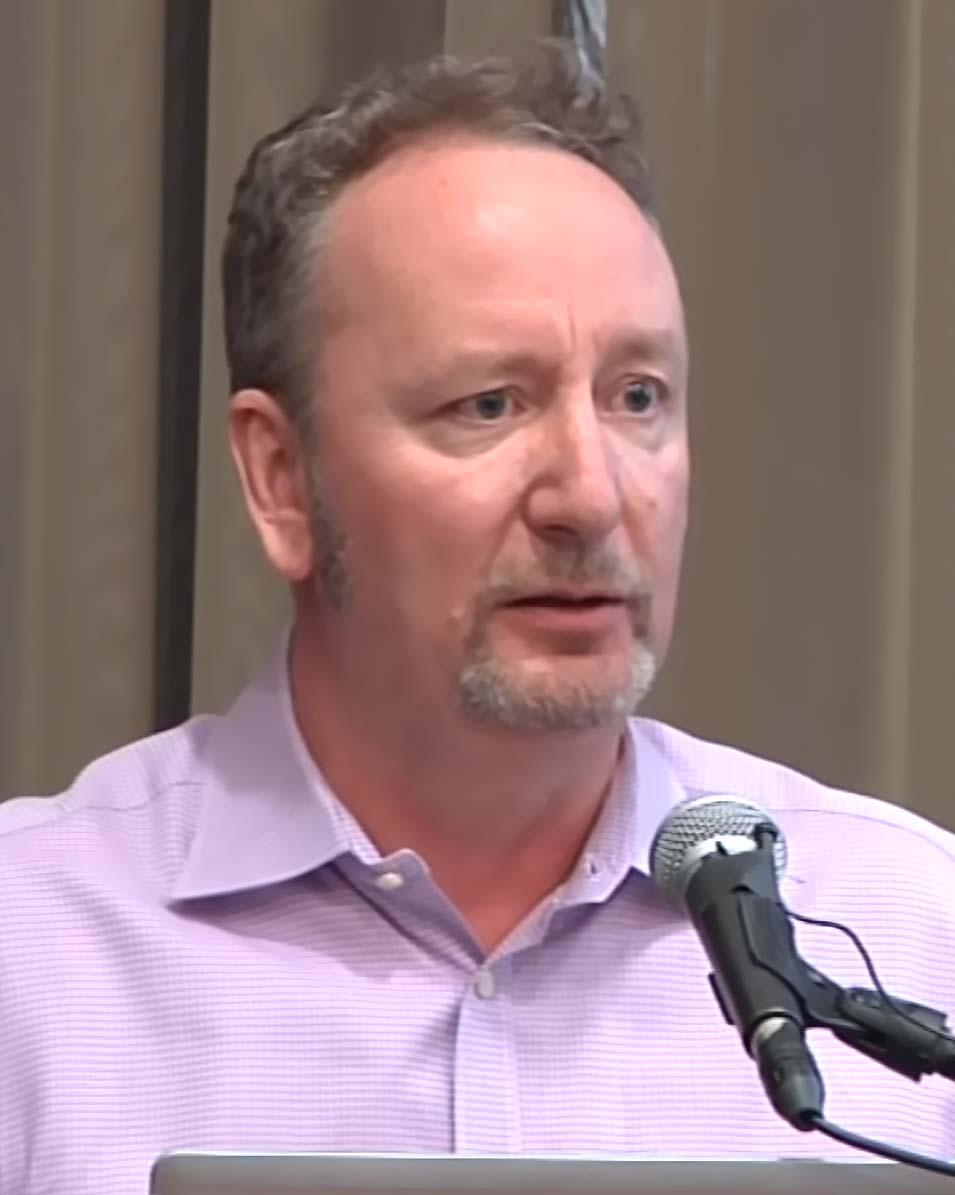
Mark Blyth

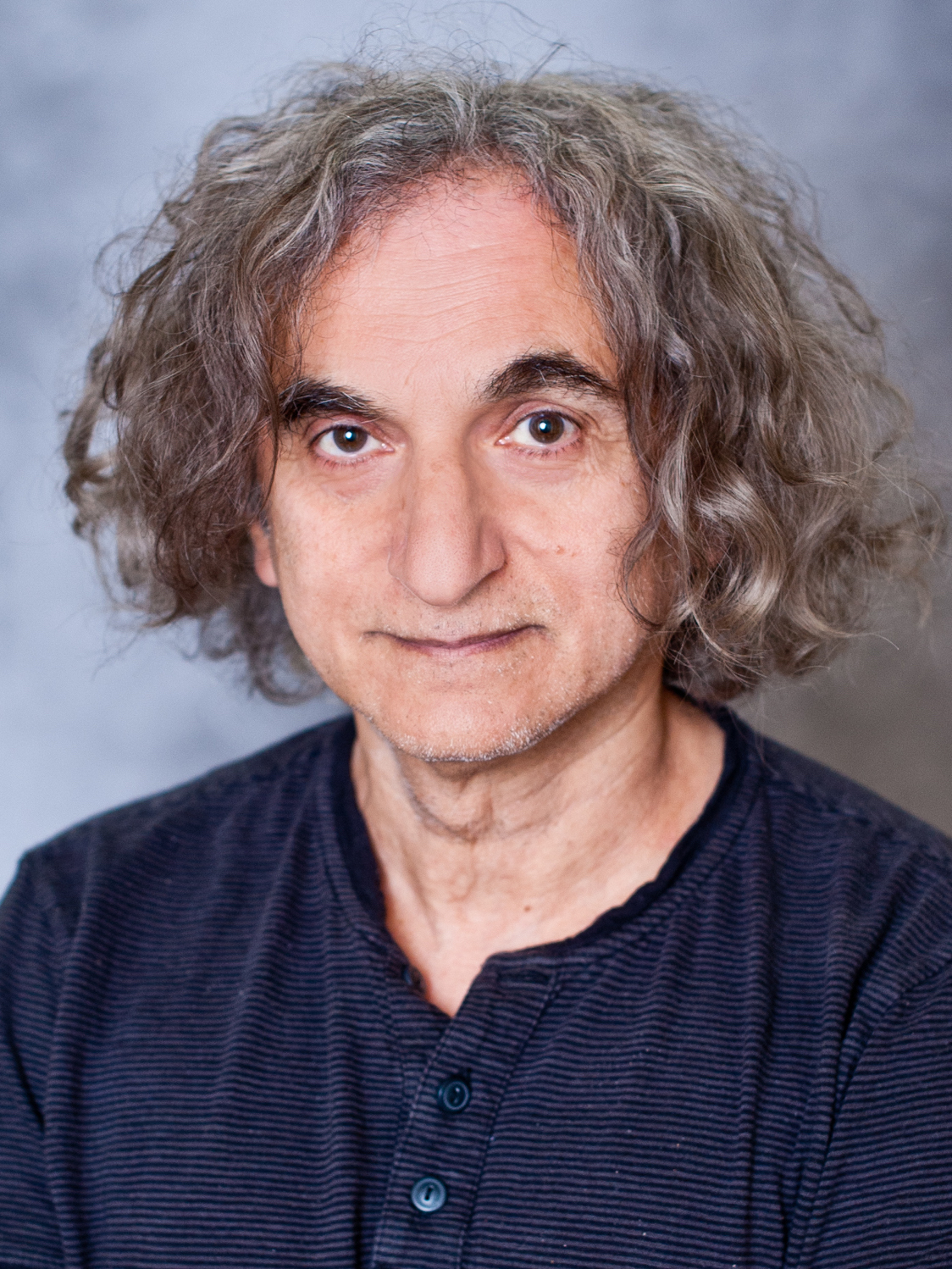
Oded Galor

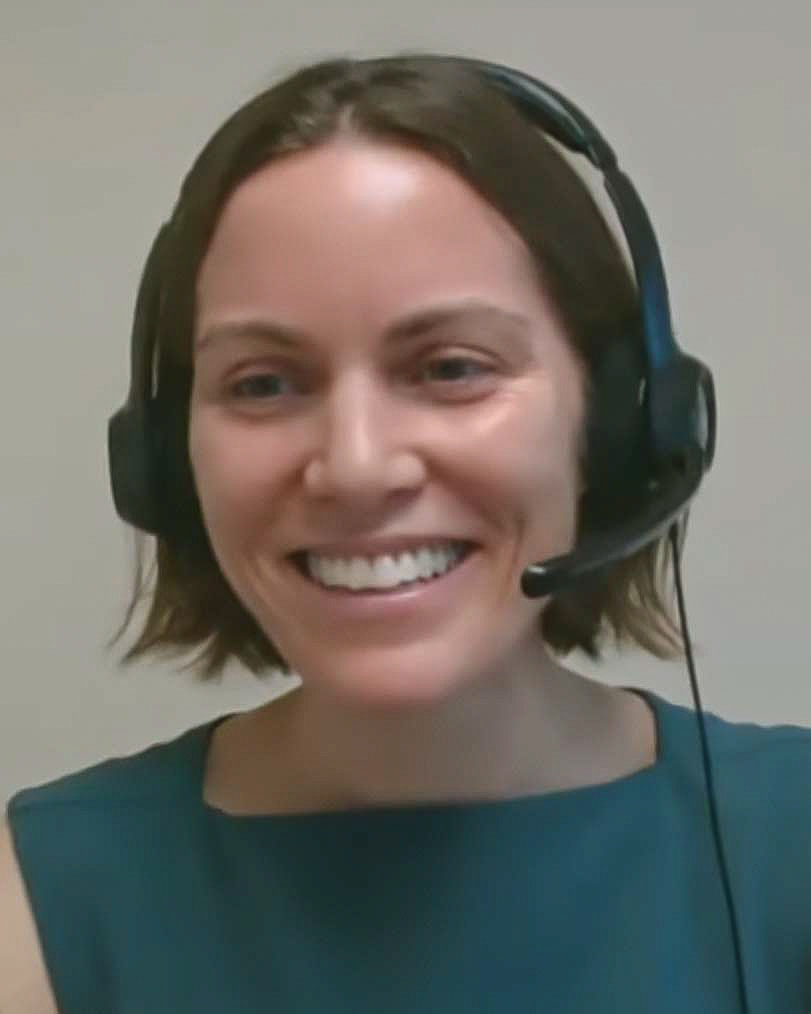
Emily Oster

- Anna Aizer – Maurice R. Greenberg Professor of Economics
- Mark Blyth – William R. Rhodes '57 Professor of International Economics and director of the Rhodes Center for International Economics and Finance
- Phillip D. Cagan – professor of Economics (1959–1966)
- John Friedman – professor of Economics, chair of Economics and professor of International and Public Affairs
- Oded Galor – Herbert H. Goldberger Professor of Economics, developer of the unified growth theory
- Alvin Hansen – instructor in Economics (1916–1919)
- Peter Howitt – professor emeritus of Economics, Nobel laureate (2025, Economic Sciences), co-originator of the Schumpeterian paradigm with Philippe Aghion
- Rafael La Porta – Robert J. and Nancy D. Carney University Professor of Economics
- Ross Levine – James and Merryl Tisch Professor of Economics; advisor to the United States Treasury, Federal Reserve System, and World Bank; highly cited economist, ranked 10th in the world, according to RePEc
- Glenn Loury – Merton P. Stoltz Professor of Social Sciences and professor of Economics
- Hyman Minsky – associate professor of Economics (1949–1958), namesake of the Minsky moment
- Emily Oster – JJE Goldman Sachs University Professor of Economics and International and Public Affairs
- William Poole – Herbert H. Goldberger Professor of Economics (1974–1998); president of the Federal Reserve Bank of St Louis (1998–2008)
- Susanne Schennach – Professor of Economics
- Roberto Serrano – Harrison S. Kravis University Professor of Economics
- Jesse Shapiro – George S. and Nancy B. Parker Professor of Economics (2015–2021)
- Vernon L. Smith – professor of Economics (1967–1968); Nobel laureate (2002, Economic Sciences)
- George Stigler – professor of Economics (1946–1947); Nobel laureate (1982, Economic Sciences)
- David N. Weil (A.B. 1982) – James and Merryl Tisch Professor of Economics
- Ivo Welch – CV Starr Chair of Finance and Economics (2004–11)

=== Sociology ===
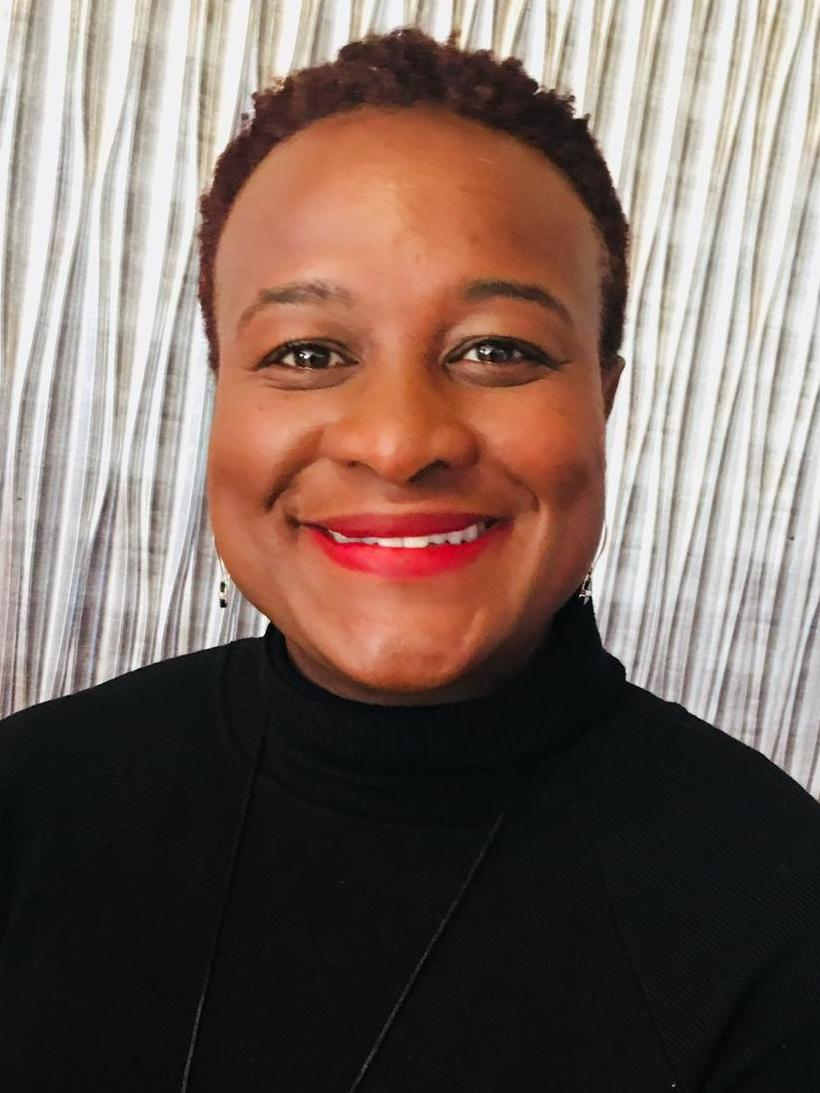
Prudence Carter

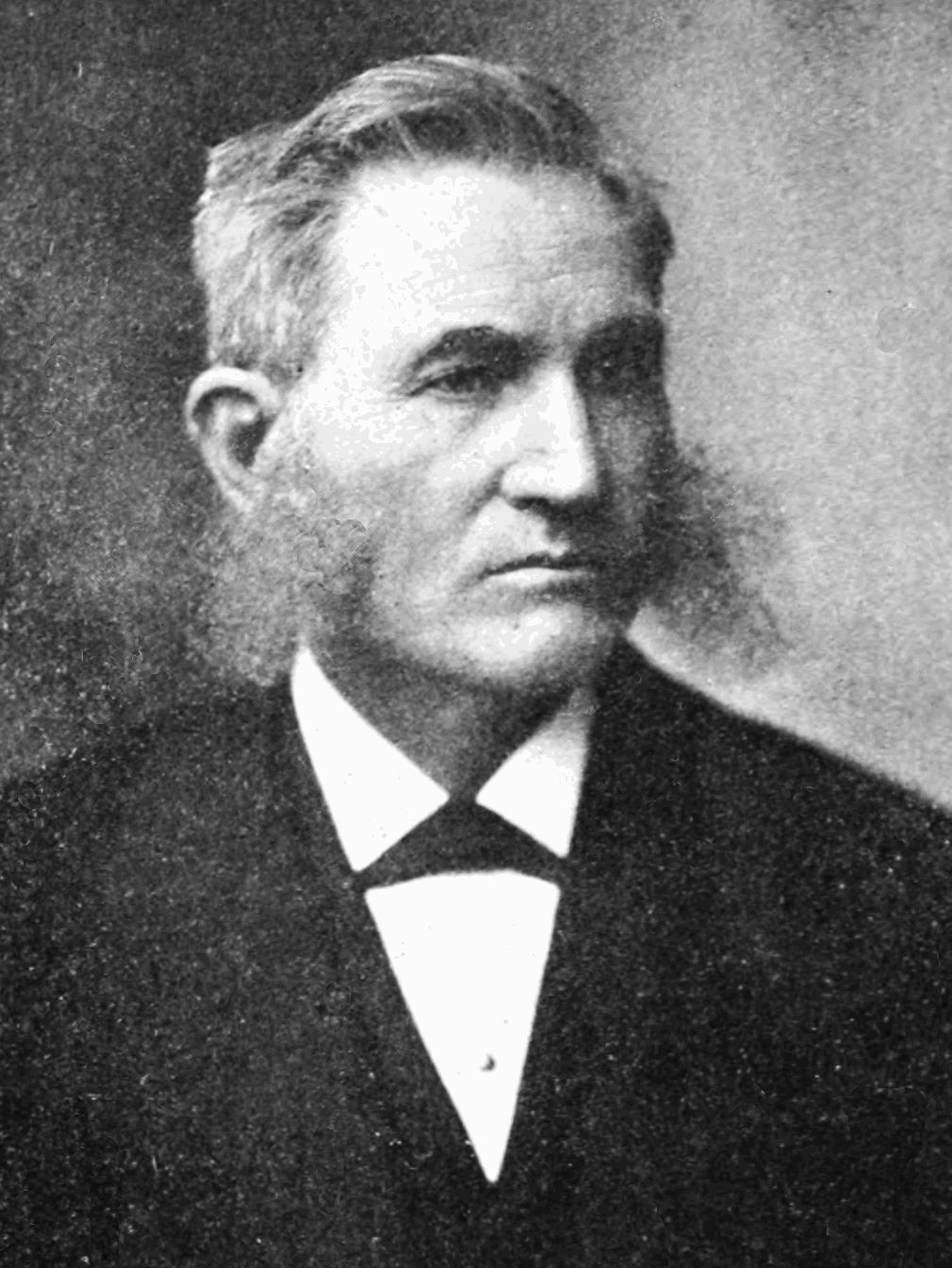
Lester Frank Ward

- Sandra Lynn Barnes – C.V. Starr Professor of Sociology, chair of Sociology
- Prudence Carter – Sarah and Joseph Jr. Dowling Professor of Sociology
- Scott Frickel – professor of Environment and Society and Sociology
- Dennis Hogan – Robert E. Turner Distinguished Professor Emeritus of Population Studies
- Jose Itzigsohn – professor of Sociology
- J. Timmons Roberts – professor of Environment and Society and Sociology
- Susan Short – Robert E. Turner Distinguished Professor of Population Studies
- Mark C. Suchman – professor of Sociology (2008–)
- Lester Frank Ward – professor of Sociology; first president of the American Sociological Association and "father of American sociology"
- Dennis Wrong – assistant professor of Sociology (1956–1961); during his tenure, published The Oversocialized Conception of Man in Modern Sociology

== Visual and performing arts ==
- Shura Baryshnikov – head of Movement at the Brown University/Trinity Repertory Company MFA program
- Wendy Edwards – painter; professor of Art (retired)
- Shigeko Kubota – artist in residence (1974–1983), avant-garde Japanese artist associated with Fluxus
- Ron Nelson – composer; professor of Music (retired)
- Paul Phillips – conductor, composer, and world's leading scholar on the music of author Anthony Burgess

== Unclassified ==
- Kermit S. Champa – art historian, Andrea V. Rosenthal Professor of the History of Art and Architecture
- Eugene Jarecki – visiting fellow at the Watson Institute for International and Public Affairs
- Otto Neugebauer – historian of mathematics; professor of the History of Mathematics
- Edward L. Widmer – historian, Clinton administration speechwriter; director, John Carter Brown Library

== Deans ==
=== Dean of the college ===
- Katherine Bergeron – dean of the college (2006–2013); 11th president of Connecticut College (2014–)
- Sheila Blumstein – dean of the college (1987–1997)
- Maud Mandel – dean of the college (2014–2018); 18th president of Williams College (2018–)

=== Dean of the graduate school ===
- Carl Barus – dean of the Graduate Department (1903–1926)
- Andrew G. Campbell – dean of the graduate school (2016–2022)
- Donald Hornig – dean of the graduate school (1952–1953)
- Barnaby Keeney – dean of the graduate school (1926–1953)
- Robert Bruce Lindsay (A.B., Sc.M. 1920) – dean of the graduate school (1954–1966)
- Edmund Morgan – acting dean of the graduate school (1951–1952)

=== Dean of the School of Public Health ===
- Ashish Jha – dean of the School of Public Health (2020–2025)
- Bess Marcus – dean of the School of Public Health (2017–2020)

=== Dean of the School of Engineering ===
- Tejal A. Desai (Sc.B. 1994) – dean of the School of Engineering (2022–)
- Lawrence Larson – founding dean of the School of Engineering (2011–2022)
- Rodney J. Clifton – dean of the School of Engineering (1998–2003)

== Provosts ==
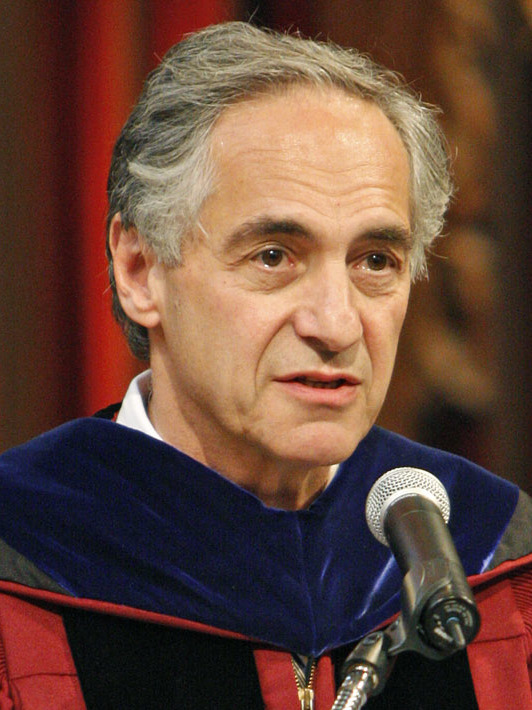
Robert Zimmer

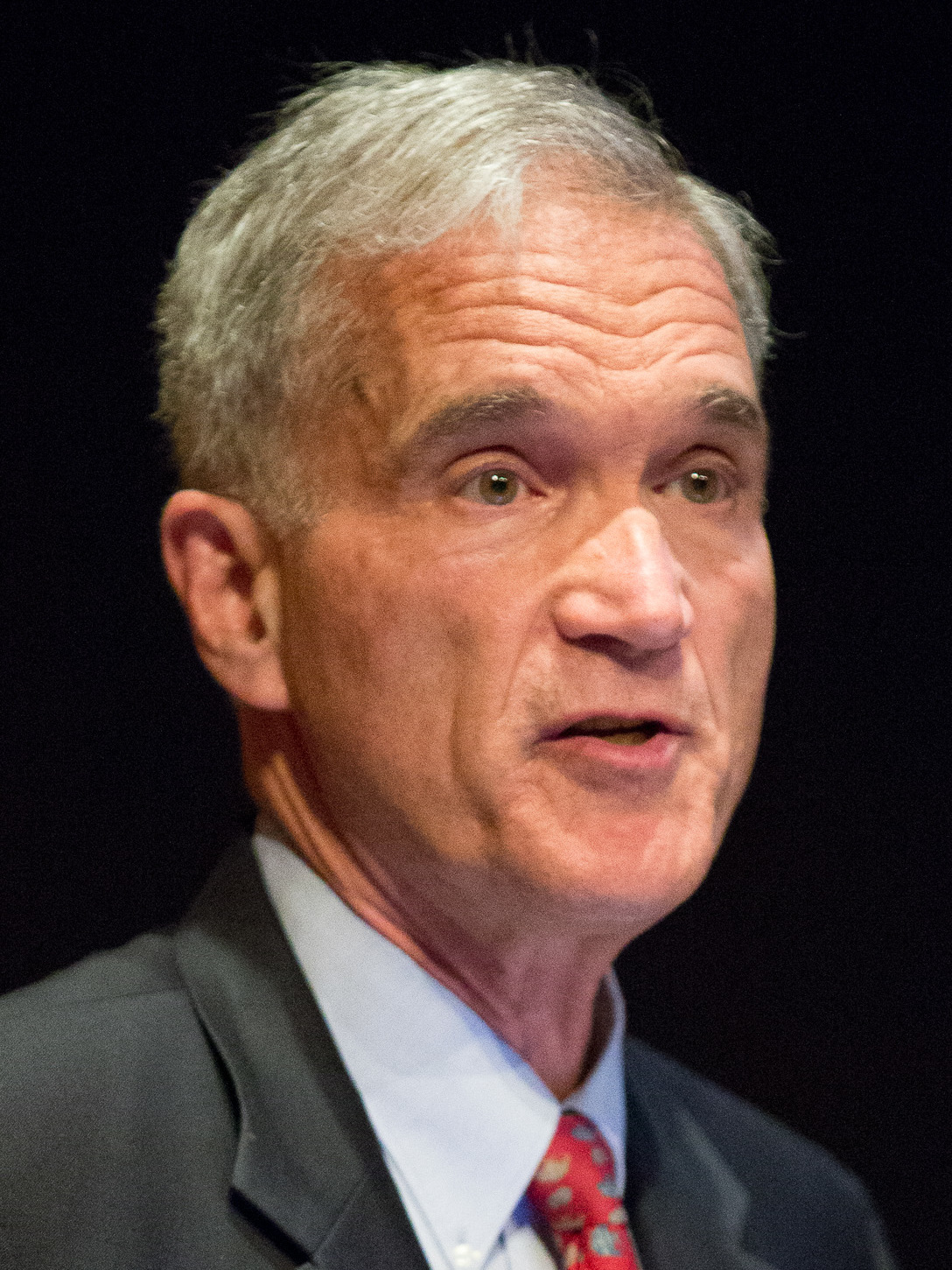
David Kertzer

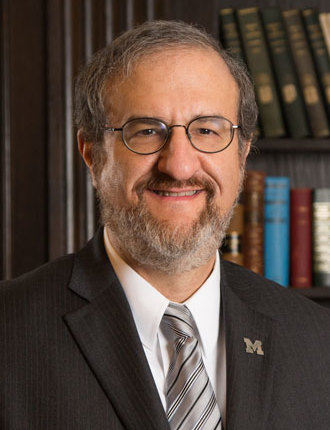
Mark Schlissel

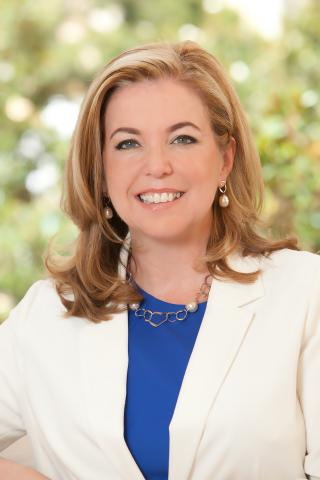
Vicki Colvin

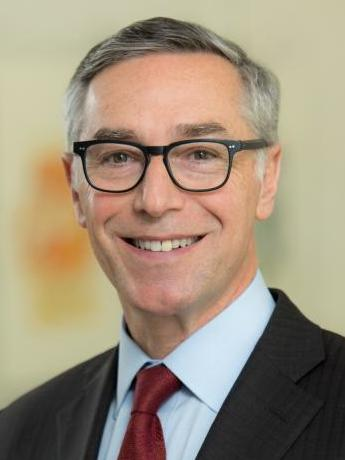
Richard M. Locke

- James R. Pomerantz – sixth provost (1995–1998)
- William S. Simmons (A.B. 1960) – seventh provost (1998–1999)
- Robert Zimmer – ninth provost (2002–2006); 13th president of the University of Chicago (2006–2021)
- David Kertzer (A.B. 1969) – 10th provost (2006–2011)
- Mark Schlissel – 11th provost (2011–2014); 14th president of the University of Michigan (2014–2022)
- Vicki Colvin – 12th provost (2014–2015)
- Richard M. Locke – 13th provost (2015–2022)
- Francis J. Doyle III – 14th provost (2023–)

== Presidents ==
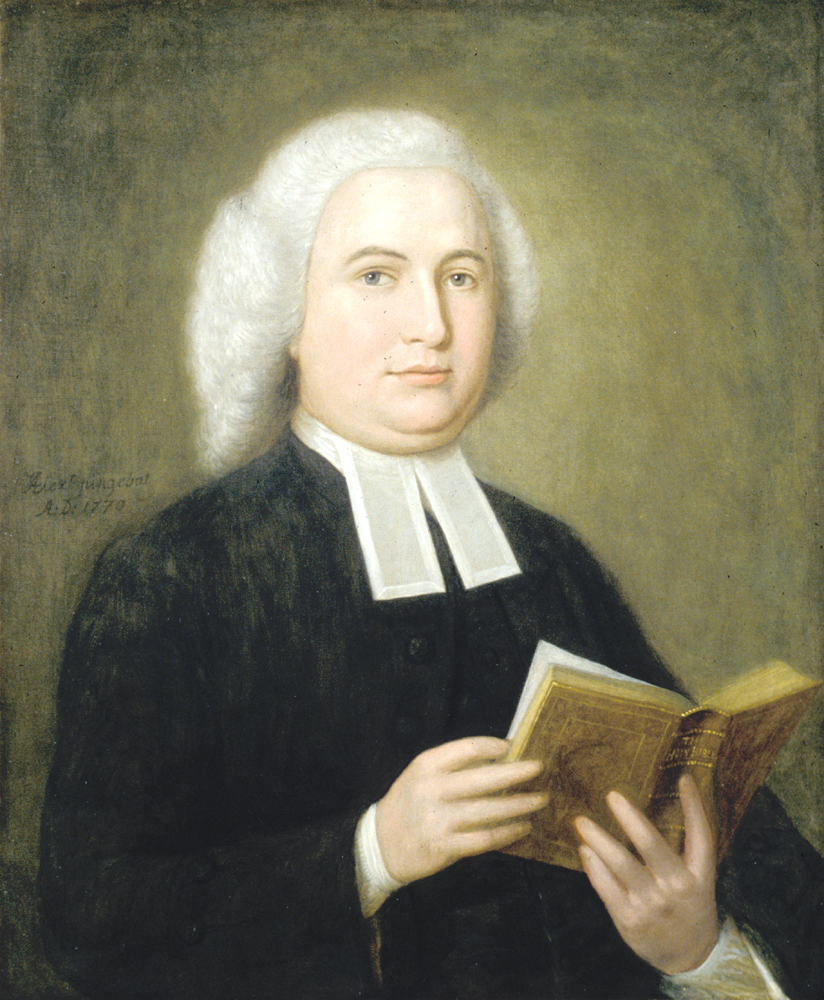
James Manning

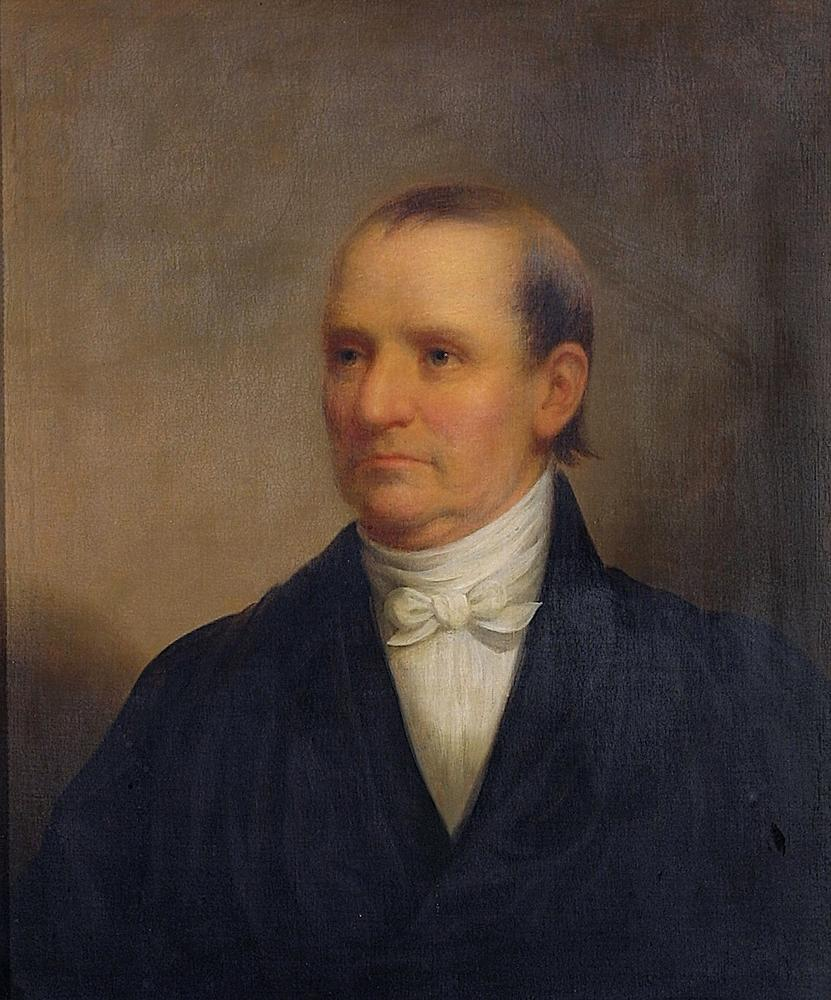
Asa Messer

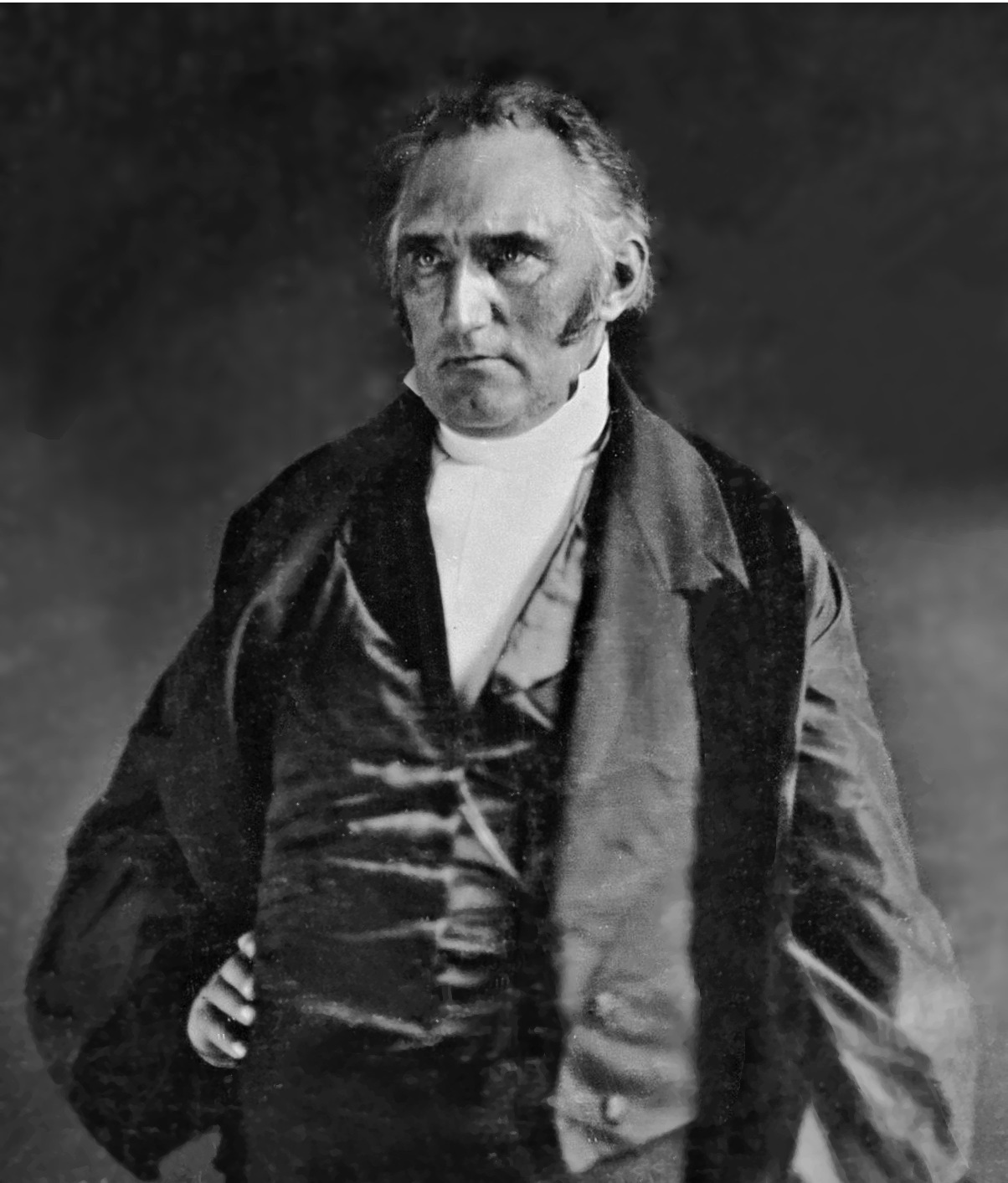
Francis Wayland

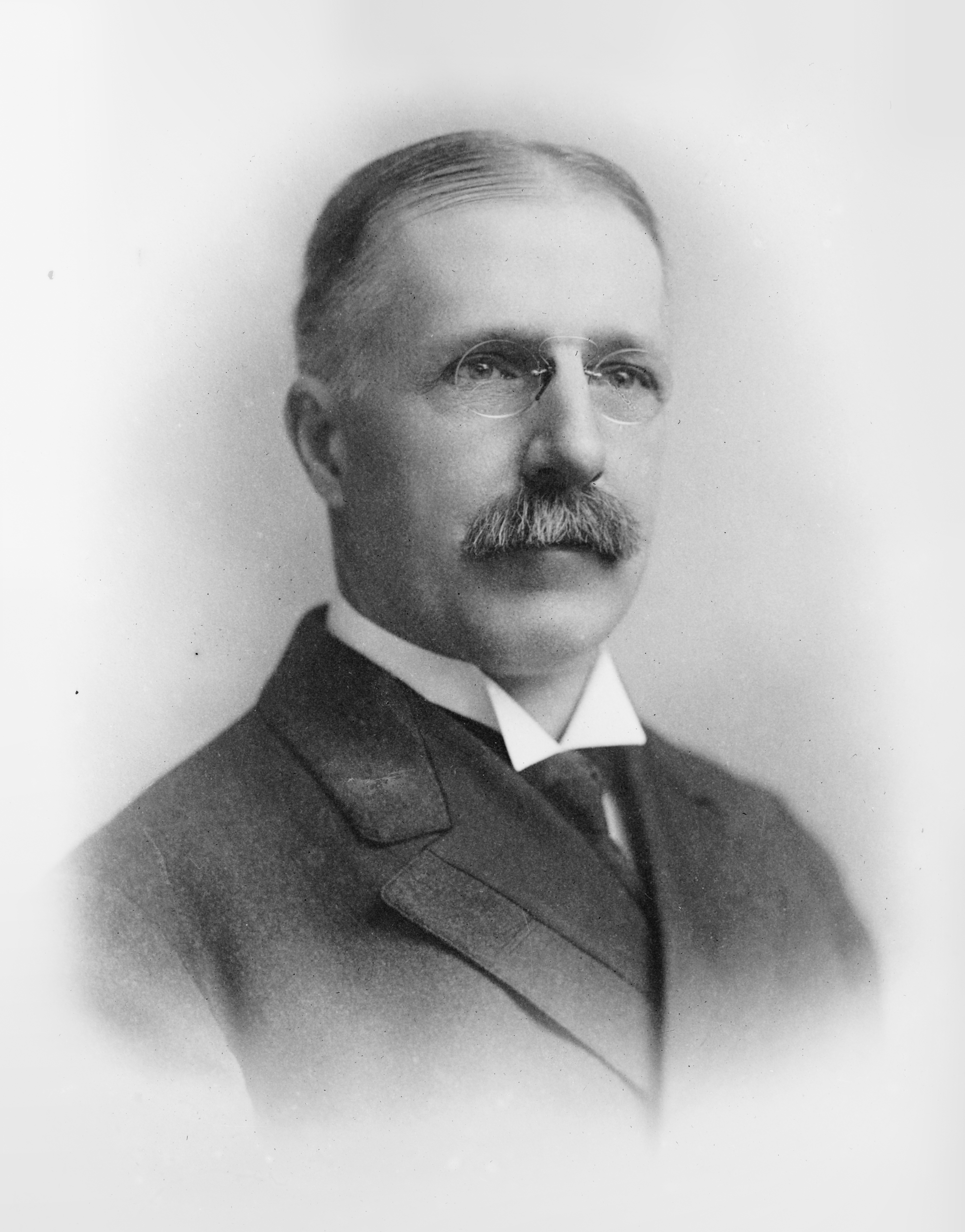
William Faunce

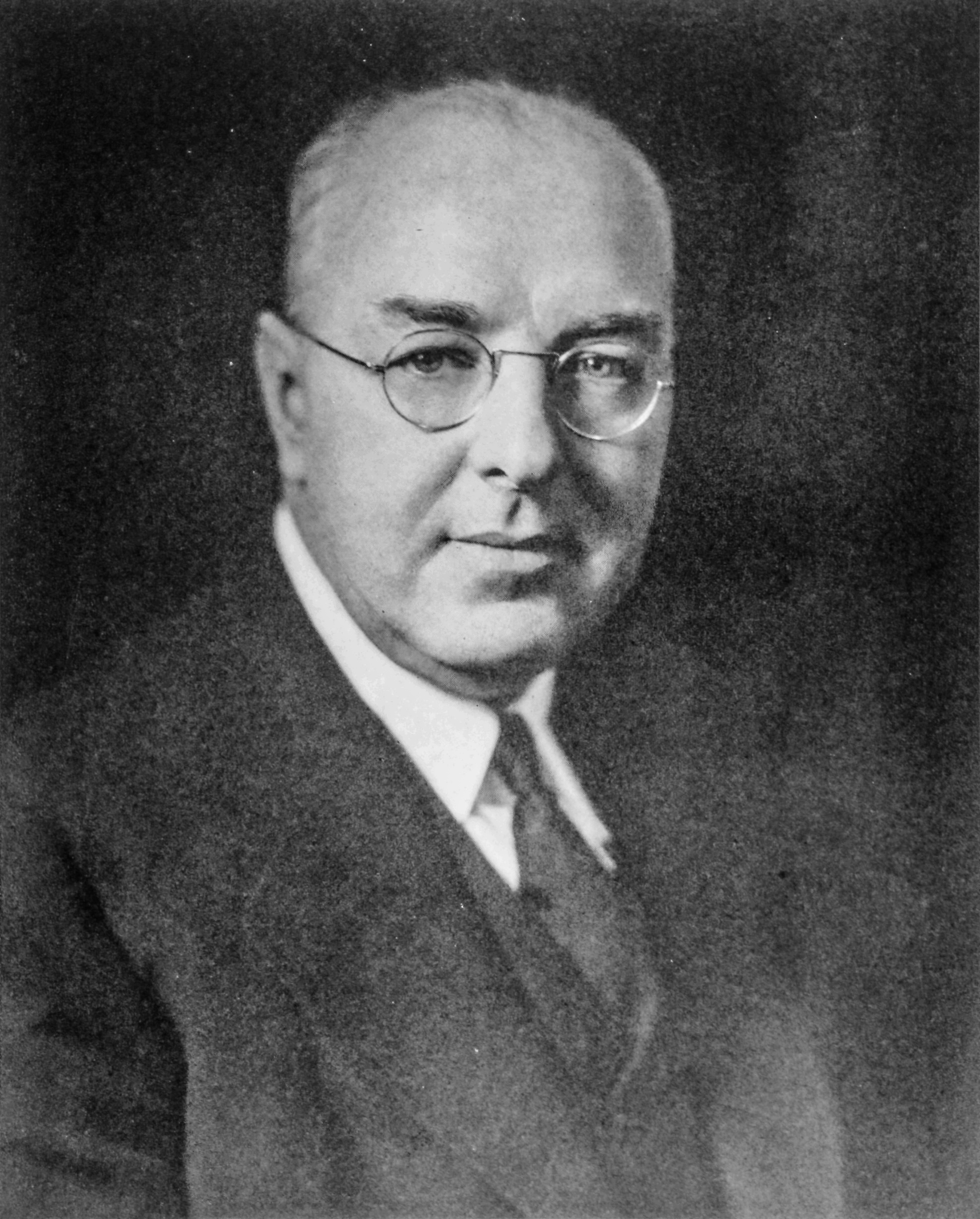
Henry Wriston

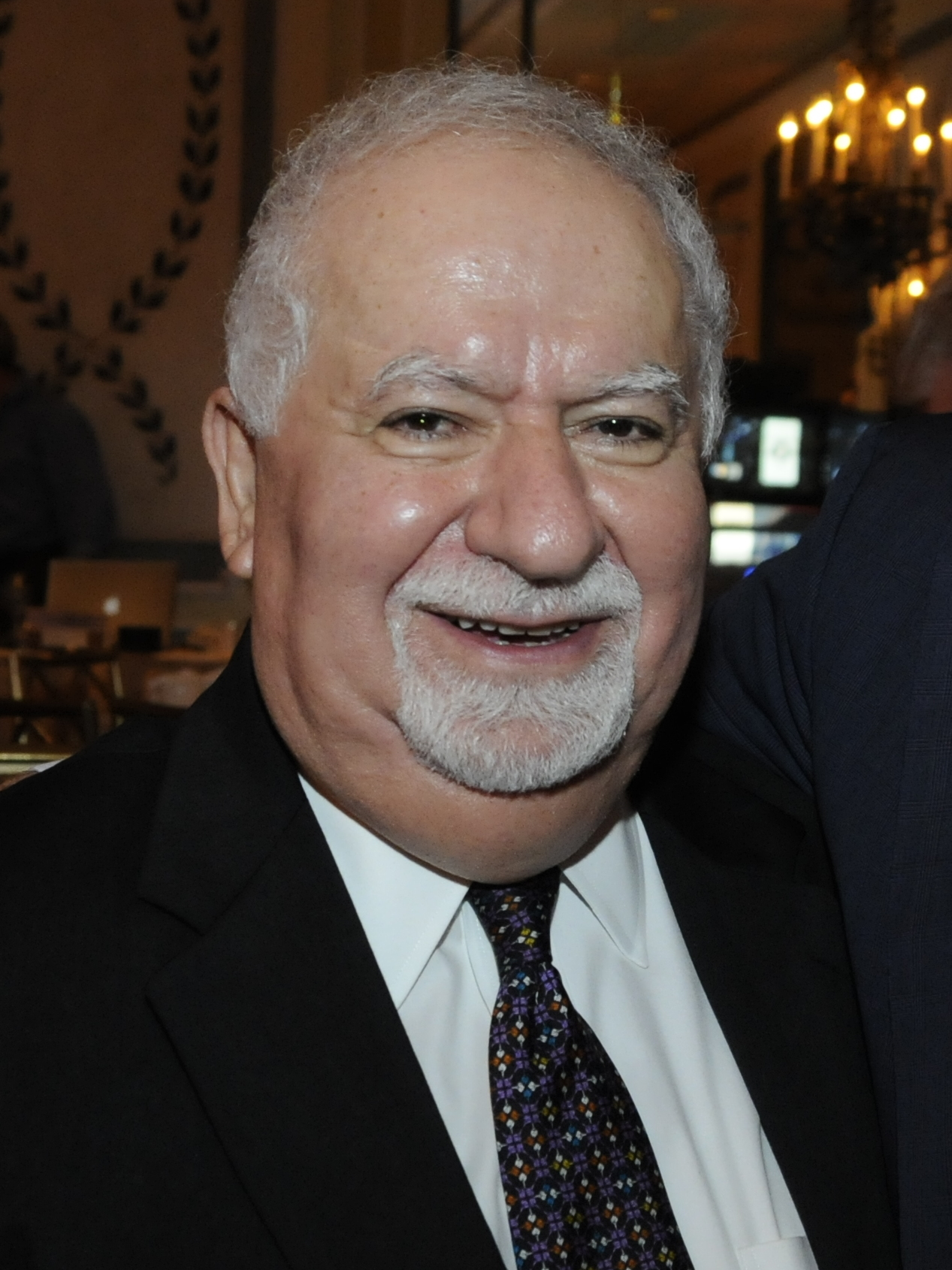
Vartan Gregorian

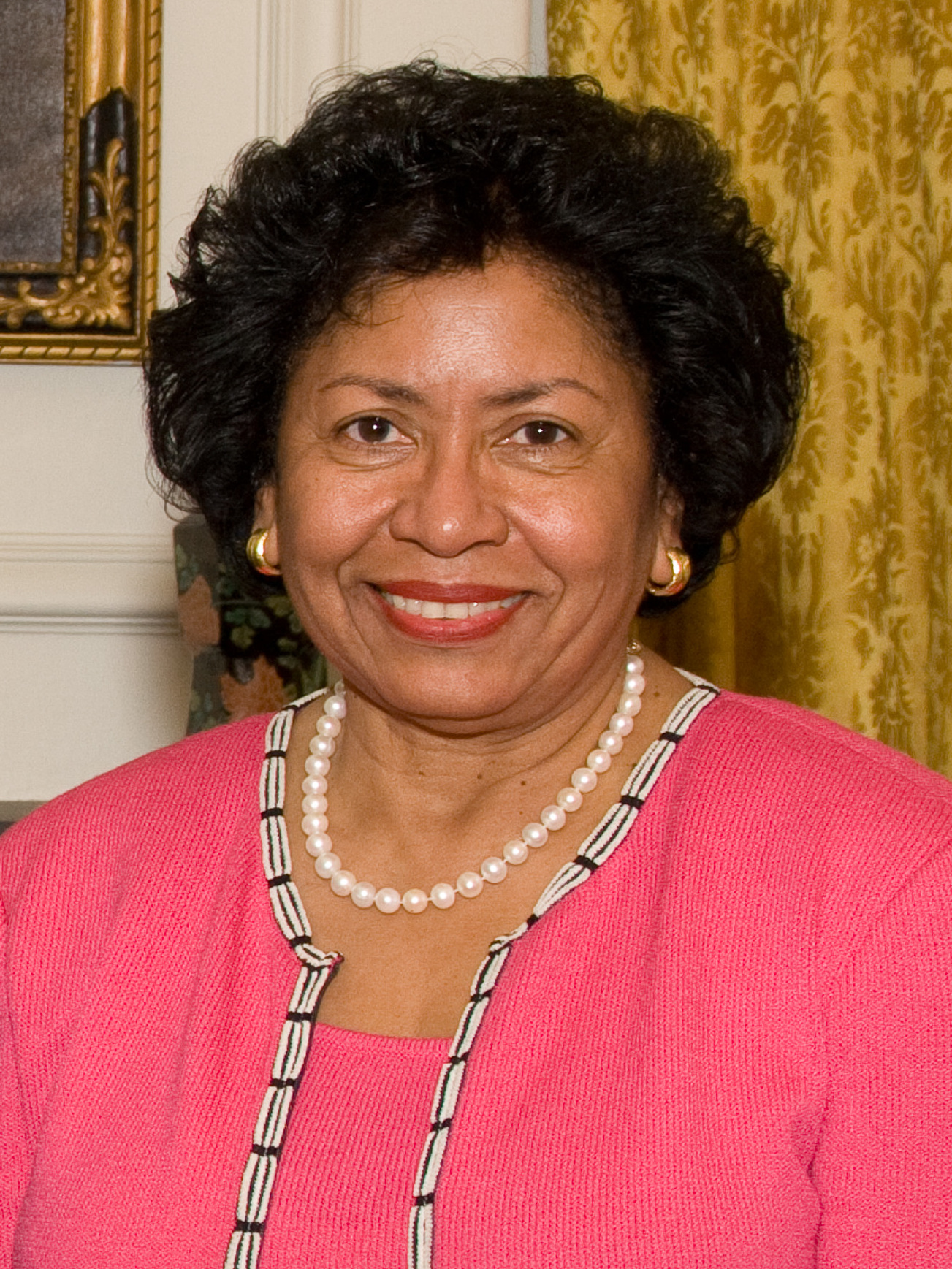
Ruth Simmons

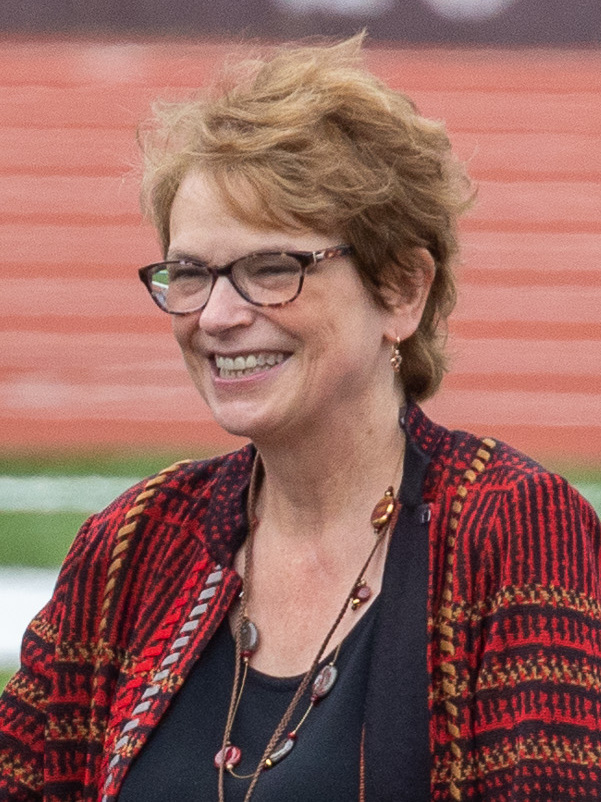
Christina Paxson

- James Manning (1765–1791)
- Jonathan Maxcy (1792–1802)
- Asa Messer (1802–1826)
- Francis Wayland (1827–1855)
- Barnas Sears (1855–1867)
- Alexis Caswell (1868–1872)
- Ezekiel Gilman Robinson (1872–1889)
- Elisha Benjamin Andrews (1889–1898)
- William H. P. Faunce (1899–1929)
- Clarence Augustus Barbour (1929–1937)
- Henry Merritt Wriston (1937–1955)
- Barnaby Conrad Keeney (1955–1966)
- Ray L. Heffner (1966–1969)
- Donald Frederick Hornig (1970–1976)
- Howard Robert Swearer (1977–1988)
- Vartan Gregorian (1989–1997)
- Gordon Gee (1998–2000)
- Ruth Simmons (2001–2012)
- Christina Paxson (2012–)
