= Carney Institute for Brain Science =

Brown University research institute

Coordinates: 41.82834°N 71.40099°W

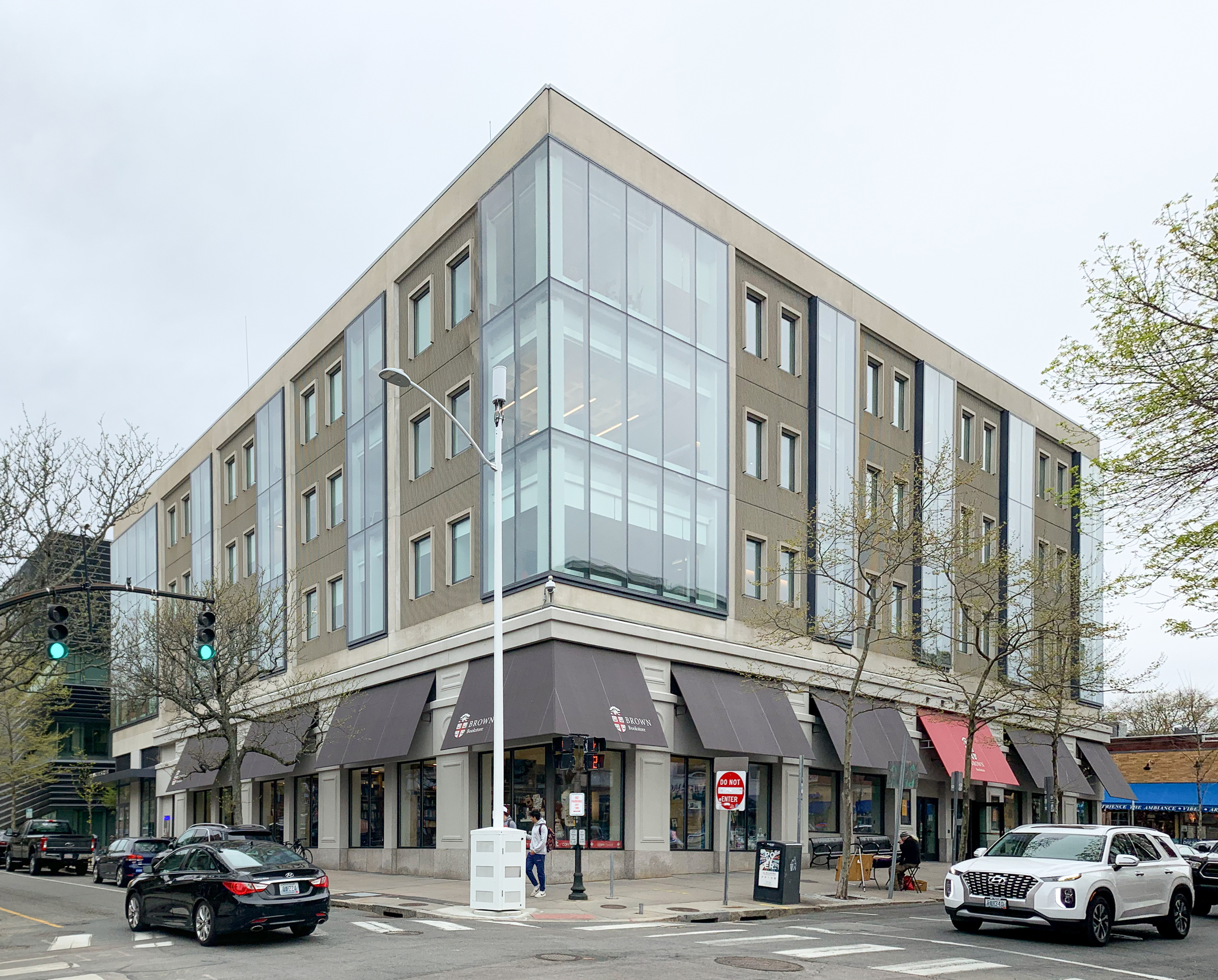
- Former name: Brown Institute for Brain Science (2009–2018)
- Established: 2009; 17 years ago
- Field of research: Neuroscience
- Director: Diane Lipscombe
- Location: 164 Angell St, Providence RI, Providence, Rhode Island
- Campus: Brown University
- Website: brown.edu/carney

The Robert J. & Nancy D. Carney Institute for Brain Science is a cross-departmental neuroscience research institute at Brown University in Providence, Rhode Island. The institute's core focus areas include brain-computer interfaces and computational neuroscience. The institute also focuses on research into mechanisms of cell death with the interest of developing therapies for neurodegenerative diseases.

== History ==
Developing from a Burroughs Wellcome Fund grant for graduate research, the program was inaugurated in 2009 as the Brown Institute for Brain Science. In 2018, the center was renamed the Robert J. & Nancy D. Carney Institute for Brain Science in recognition of a $100 million gift. The donation—one of the largest in the university's history—established the program as one of the best-endowed university neuroscience programs in the country.

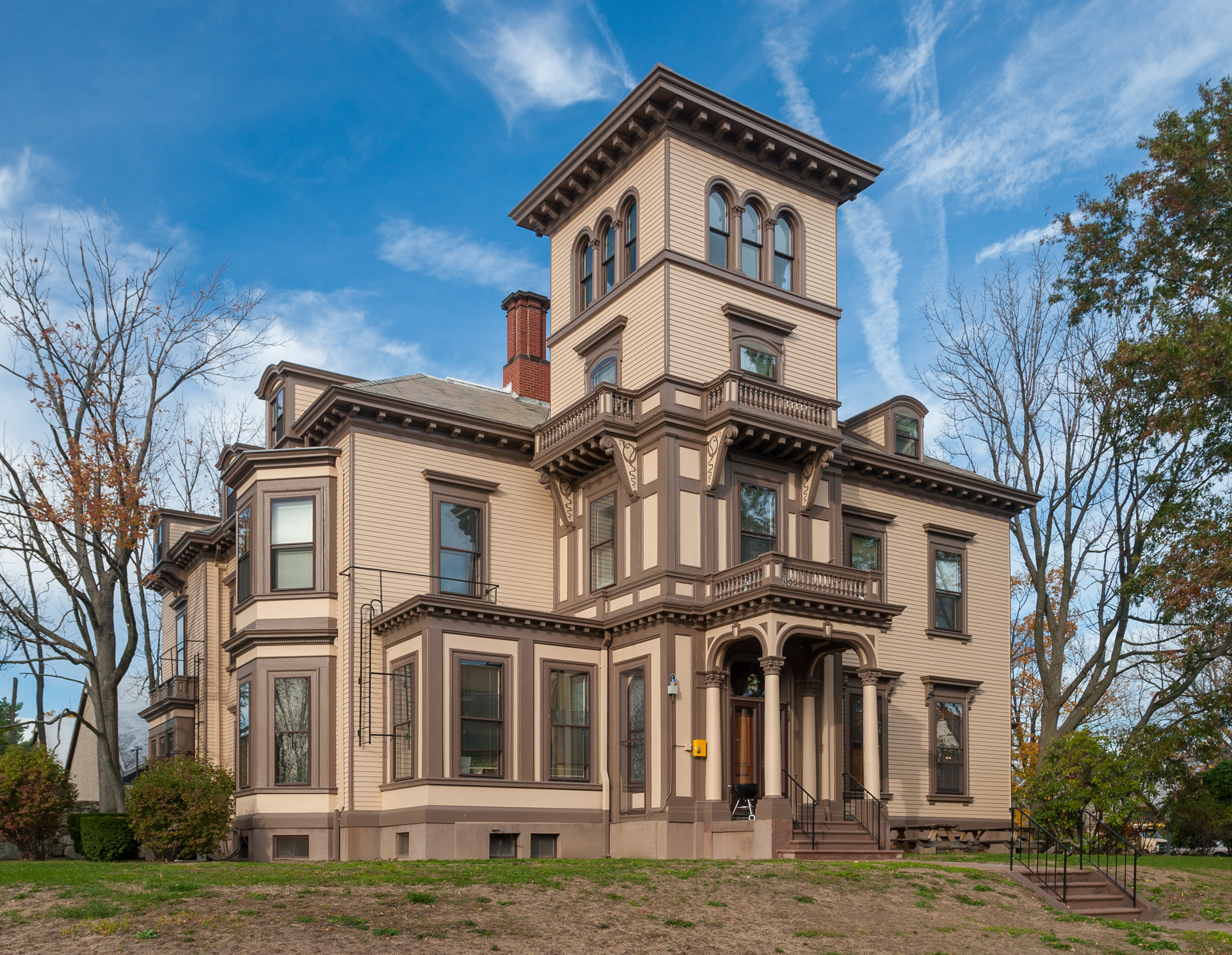
Until 2019, the Carney Institute's offices were located at 2 Stimson Avenue

In 2019, the institute moved from 2 Stimson Avenue to a renovated office on Thayer Street.

=== Centers ===
The Carney Institute houses seven research centers led by affiliated faculty members. These are the Center for Alzheimer's Disease Research, Center for Computational Brain Science, Center for the Neurobiology of Cells and Circuits, Center for Translational Neuroscience, Center for Vision Research, COBRE Center for Central Nervous System Function, and COBRE Center for Neuromodulation.

In 2021, Brown established the Center for Alzheimer's Disease Research, a research program housed within the Carney Institute. Financed by two gifts totaling $30 million, the center plans to conduct clinical and laboratory-based research focusing on the early detection and treatment of Alzheimer's and related conditions. The Center for Alzheimer's Disease Research is affiliated with the Brown University School of Public Health and local hospitals and has partnerships with Lund University and the University of Gothenburg in Sweden.

== Research ==
The Carney Institute is best known for its role in BrainGate, a brain-computer interface technology developed, in part, by Institute founder John Donoghue and affiliated professor Leigh Hochberg. In 2014, the lab of Carney–affiliate Arto Nurmikko developed the Brown Wireless Device, a wireless brain-sensing system. In 2021 Hochberg and Nurmikko used the device to demonstrate the first human use of high-bandwidth brain-computer interface. The device is capable of transmitting neural signals at a single-neuron resolution in full broadband fidelity.

In 2019, the institute reported the discovery of a previously unknown set of neurons that spikes rhythmically at gamma range intervals, coordinating sensory encoding in a way analogous to a metronome.

== People ==
- Diane Lipscombe, Director, Director of the Center for Alzheimer's Disease Research, president of the Society for Neuroscience (2018-19)
- Christopher I. Moore, Associate Director
- John Donoghue, Founder, former Director
- Judy Liu, Associate Director of the Center for Translational Neuroscience
- Michael J. Frank, Director, Center for Computational Brain Science

=== Affiliated faculty ===
- David Berson
- Wayne Bowen
- Mary Carskadon
- Eugene Charniak
- Leon Cooper
- Lorin Crawford
- Stuart Geman
- Edward Hawrot
- Christopher S. Hill
- Leigh Hochberg
- David Laidlaw
- Lawrence Larson
- Peter Monti
- Arto Nurmikko
- Michael Paradiso
- John M. Sedivy
- James A. Simmons
- William H. Warren
- Rena R. Wing
- Jingming Xu
