= Wyss Institute =

Wyss Institute may refer to:

- Wyss Institute for Biologically Inspired Engineering, at Harvard University in the United States
- Wyss Center for Bio and Neuroengineering, in Switzerland

== See also ==
- Hansjörg Wyss
- Wyss
