= Wyss =

Wyss (German pronunciation: [ˈʋiːs]) is a Swiss surname. The Alemannic (Schwäbisch) form of the Old High German "Wīs" (wise, clever, experienced, knows).

Notable persons with the surname include:

- Amanda Wyss (born 1960), American actress
- Amy Wyss (born 1970/1971), Swiss-American billionaire businesswoman and philanthropist.
- Andre Wyss (contemporary), American professor of paleontology
- Arthur Wyss (Archivar) (1852–1900), German historian and archivist
- Bernhard Wyss (1833–1890), Swiss writer
- Bernhard Wyss (1905–1986), Swiss philologist
- Brigit Wyss (born 1960), Swiss politician
- Clotilde von Wyss (1871–1938), English science-educator
- Danilo Wyss (born 1985), Swiss road racing bicyclist
- David von Wyss (1763–1839), Swiss politician
- David Wyss, American economist
- Denise Wyss (born 1965), first priestess of the Christian Catholic Church of Switzerland
- Dieter Wyss (1923–1994), German anthropologist and professor in Würzburg
- Dorothea Wyss (born around 1430/32, died after 1487) married Niklaus von Flüe, the patron saint of Switzerland
- Esther Egger-Wyss (born 1952), Swiss politician (CVP)
- Franz Anatol Wyss (born 1940), Swiss painter
- Georg von Wyss (1816–1893), Swiss historian
- Hansjörg Wyss (contemporary), Swiss billionaire
- Johann David Wyss (1743–1818), Swiss author of The Swiss Family Robinson
- Johann Emanuel Wyss (1782–1837), Swiss painter and draftsman
- Johann Rudolf Wyss (1782–1830), Swiss author and folklorist; son of Johann David
- Johann Rudolf Wyss (der Ältere) (1763–1845), Swiss country priest and poet
- Laure Wyss (1913–2002), Swiss journalist and writer
- Marcel Wyss (born 1986), Swiss road cyclist
- Max Albert Wyss (1908–1977), Swiss journalist and photographer
- Monika Wyss (born 1959), Swiss Swiss Roman Catholic "priestess" (not officially recognized)
- Orville Wyss (1912–1993), American microbiologist
- Paul Wyss (born 1928), Swiss politician and former ice hockey player
- Paul Friedrich von Wyss (1844–1888), Swiss jurist and legal scholar
- Ruedi Wyss (1932–2007), Swiss musician and composer
- Sophie Wyss (1897–1983), Swiss soprano
- Thomas Wyss (born 1966), Swiss professional football player
- Ursula Wyss (born 1973), Swiss economist and politician
- Verena Wyss (born 1945), Swiss writer
- Vinzenz Wyss (born 1965), Swiss communication scientists

Patrician families:

- Wyss (Patrizierfamilie, mit den Kolben)
- Wyss (Patrizierfamilie, mit der Lilie)

== See also ==
- Escher Wyss (Zürich), quarter of Zürich, Switzerland
- Escher Wyss & Cie., former engineering company in Switzerland
- Wyss Institute for Biologically Inspired Engineering, in the United States
- Wyss Center for Bio and Neuroengineering, in Switzerland
- Wyss Samen und Pflanzen, Swiss horticultural company
- WYSS, a radio station in Sault Sainte Marie, Michigan
