= John Donoghue (neuroscientist) =

American neuroscientist

John P. Donoghue
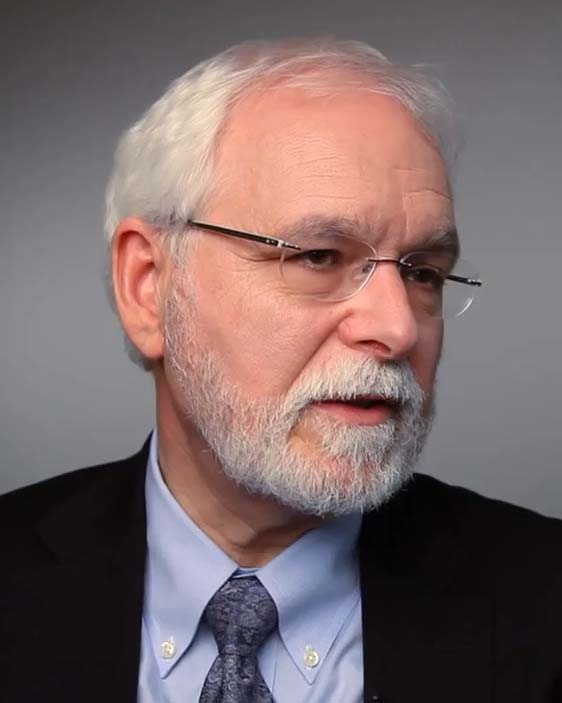
- Born: 1949 (age 76–77); Cambridge, Massachusetts
- Education: Boston University; University of Vermont; Brown University
- Scientific career
- Workplaces: Brown University
- Thesis: Thalamic projections to the somatic sensory-motor cortex (1979)
- Doctoral advisor: Ford F. Ebner
- Notable students: Liam Paninski

John Philip Donoghue (born 1949) is an American neuroscientist; he is currently the Henry Merritt Wriston Professor of Neuroscience and Professor of Engineering at Brown University, where he has taught since 1984.

Donoghue founded Brown's Carney Institute for Brain Science and directed the institute from 2008 to 2015. He later served as the founding director of the Wyss Center for Bio and Neuroengineering at Campus Biotech in Geneva, Switzerland. Donoghue is best known for his work developing BrainGate and is recognized as a pioneer in neuroprosthetics and brain–computer interfaces.

== Early life and education ==
John P. Donoghue was born in 1949 in Cambridge, Massachusetts. He earned a Bachelor of Arts in Biology from Boston University in 1971, a master's degree in anatomy from the University of Vermont in 1976, and a PhD from Brown University in 1979. Donoghue's doctoral dissertation was entitled Thalamic projections to the somatic sensory-motor cortex.

== Professional career ==
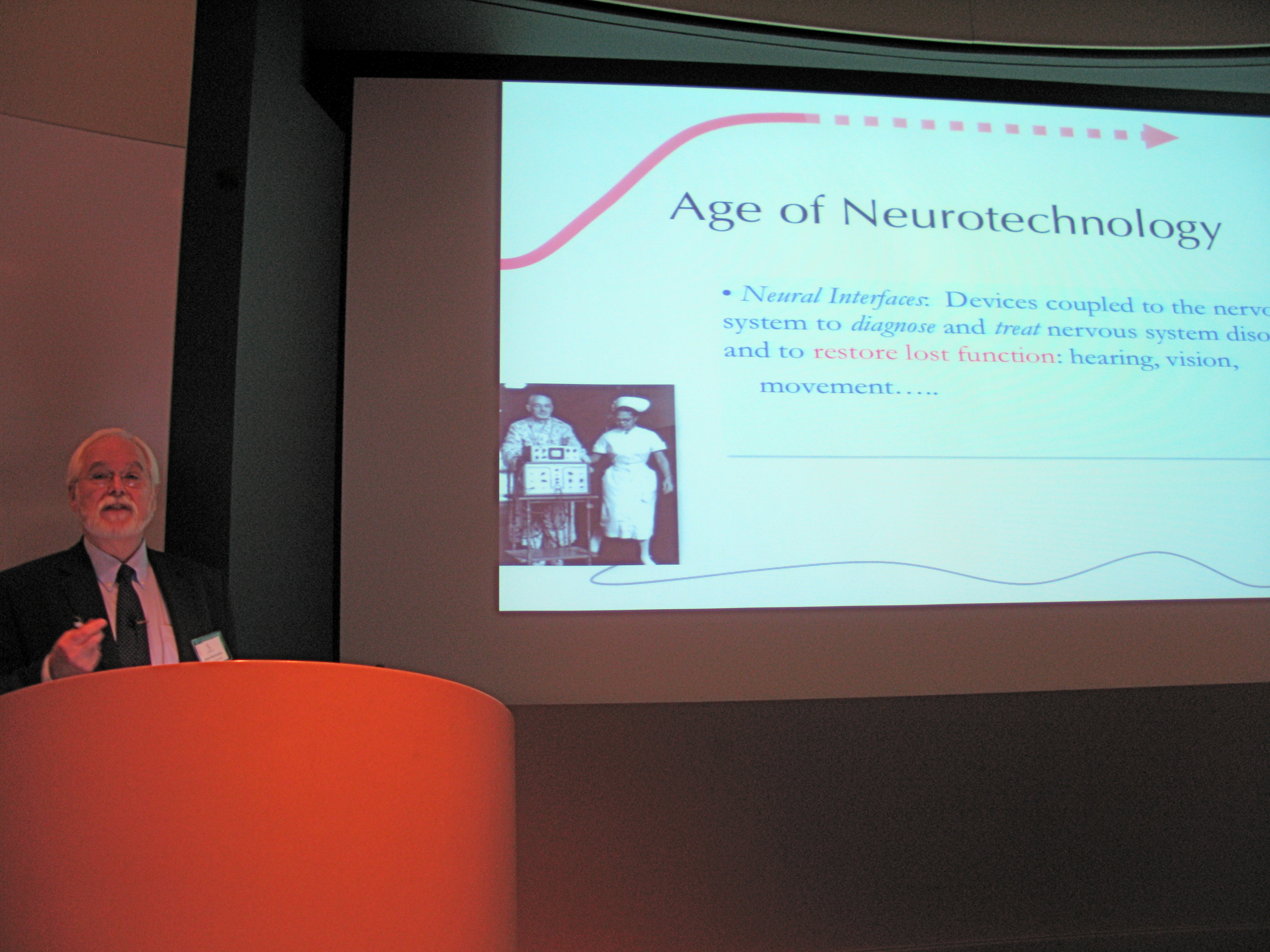
Donoghue speaks at Stanford Bio-X in October 2008

Donoghue is a founder of the discipline of neuroprosthetics and coordinated the team that developed the brain–computer interface 'BrainGate' to restore movement for people with paralysis. He was a co-founder of an early neurotechnology startup company, Cyberkinetics.

Beginning in 1999, Donoghue served as the inaugural director of Brown's Brain Science Program. The program grew into the Brown Institute for Brain Science, which was renamed the Carney Institute for Brain Science in 2019. Since 2001, Donoghue has held the Henry Merritt Wriston chair at Brown.

He conducts research at the Providence VA Medical Center.

In November 2014 he was appointed the first director of the Wyss Center for Bio and Neuroengineering in Geneva, in association with which he was appointed to an adjunct professorship at the École Polytechnique Fédérale de Lausanne and a visiting professorship at the University of Geneva. He served a five-year term in the position and was succeeded by Mary Tolikas in June 2019.

== Recognition ==
Donoghue has received several honors for the BrainGate neurotechnology: the Zülch Prize in 2007, a Roche-Nature Medicine senior award in 2010, and with Arto Nurmikko the inaugural Moshe Mirilashvili Memorial Fund B.R.A.I.N. (Breakthrough Research And Innovation in Neurotechnology) Prize in 2013. In addition in 2012 with Patrick van der Smagt he won the Erwin Schrödinger Prize of the Helmholtz Association of German Research Centres for a thought-controlled robotic arm developed by BrainGate. In 2026, he was awarded the Queen Elizabeth Prize for Engineering.

He is a fellow of several academies including the US Institute of Medicine, the American Academy of Arts and Sciences, the American Institute for Medical and Biological Engineering, the American Association for the Advancement of Science, and the National Academy of Inventors.

He was also a member of the National Institutes of Health advisory committee for the White House BRAIN Initiative instituted under President Obama.
