= Diane Lipscombe =

British neuroscientist

- Born: March 31, 1960 (age 66); Edinburgh, UK
- Education: University College London
- Scientific career
- Workplaces: Yale School of Medicine Stanford University School of Medicine Carney Institute for Brain Science at Brown University

Diane Lipscombe (born March 31, 1960) is a British neuroscientist who is a professor of science and a professor of neuroscience. She is also the director of the Center for Alzheimer's Disease Research, and the Robert J. and Nancy D. Carney Institute for Brain Science. She served as the president of the Society for Neuroscience in 2019.

Lipscombe has been recognized for her teaching, mentoring and scholarship. She was elected to the American Academy of Arts and Sciences in 2020, and she was elected a fellow of the American Association for the Advancement of Science in 2013. Additionally, Lipscombe was named one of Fast Company's most creative people in 2019 for her leadership at the Carney Institute.

== Early life and education ==
Diane Lipscombe was born on March 31, 1960, in Edinburgh, UK. Her family moved to England in 1964, and she grew up in Orpington, Kent. In 1978, she worked as a technician at the Wellcome Research Laboratories in Kent, England, under the supervision of Sir James W. Black.

A first-generation university student, Lipscombe received a B.Sc. with honors in pharmacology in 1982. She then acquired a Ph.D. in pharmacology in 1986 from University College London, under the supervision of Humphrey P. Rang; Lipscombe participated in discussions with David Colquhoun and the C-floor group. Afterwards, she completed postdoctoral work in the laboratory of Richard W. Tsien at the Yale School of Medicine from 1986 to 1988, and at the Stanford University School of Medicine from 1989 to 1990.

== Career ==
Lipscombe joined the Department of Neuroscience at Brown University in 1992, where she is currently the Thomas J. Watson Sr. Professor of Science. She has also taught courses at the Marine Biological Laboratory in Woods Hole, MA. Lipscombe serves as the director of Brown's Robert J. and Nancy D. Carney Institute for Brain Science.

Lipscombe's research focuses on expression, regulation and function of voltage-gated calcium ion channels. By 2020, Lipscombe had authored 50 scientific articles characterizing the voltage-gated calcium ion channel family of genes and their protein products. The topics of Lipscombe's articles range from individual channel biophysics to the regulation of specific channel isoforms by RNA- and DNA-binding proteins, and the contribution of tissue specific channel isoforms to disease states such as chronic pain and psychiatric disorders.

== Research ==
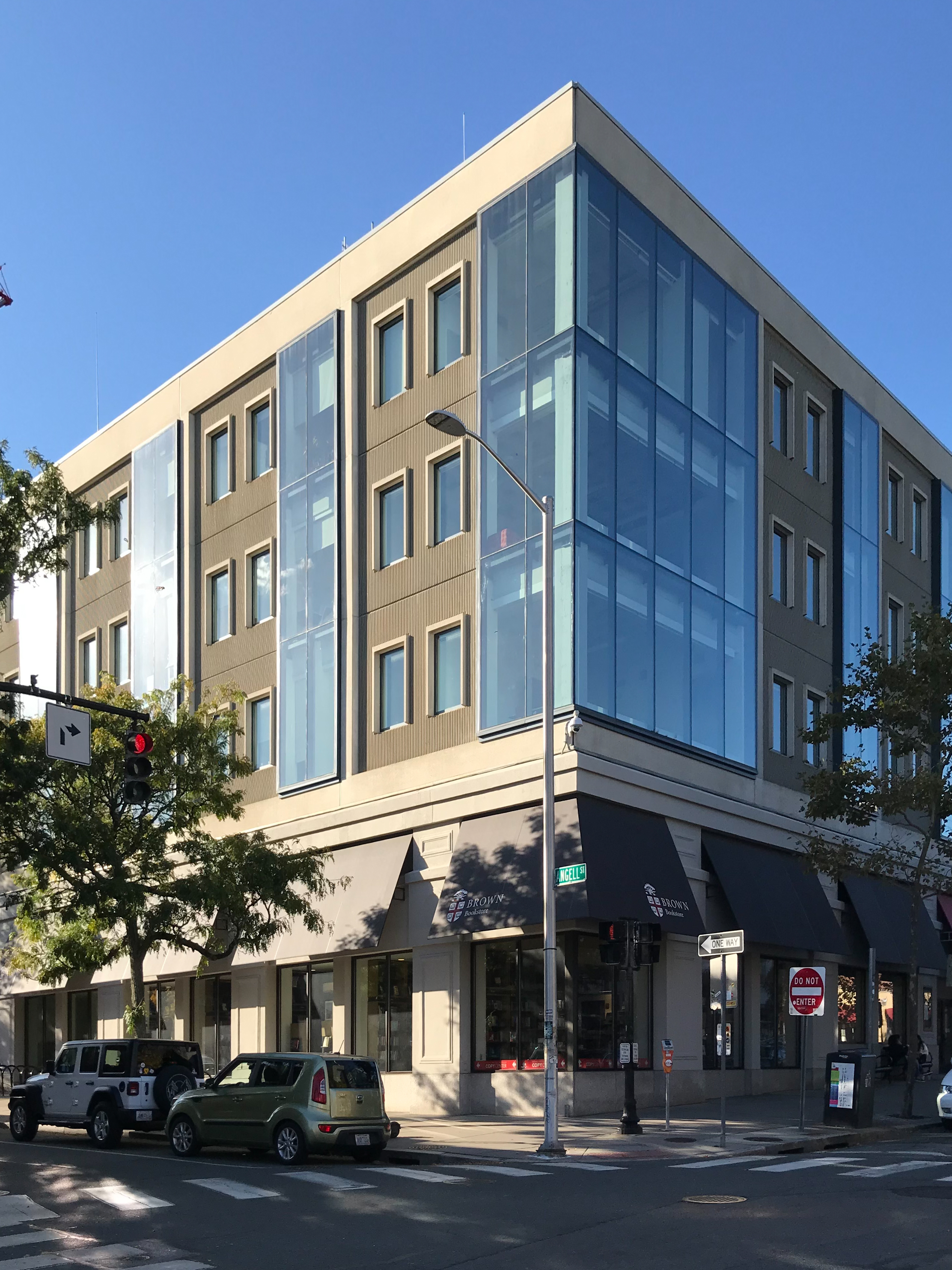
The Robert J. and Nancy D. Carney Institute for Brain Science at Brown University

Lipscombe has spent her career investigating voltage-gated calcium channels (CaV channels) within different parts of the nervous system. Voltage-gated calcium channels are found in cell membranes, they typically consist of several associated proteins encoded by separate genes. Lipscombe's lab focuses on the alpha subunit, which forms the voltage sensing and pore domains of the channel. She studies how the cellular process of alternative splicing generates multiple protein isoforms from single calcium channel genes. Alternative splicing is a feature of all 10 mammalian CaV channel alpha-subunit genes and underlies the expression of hundreds of splice isoforms – each of which can have different biophysical properties, pharmacological sensitivities, and tissue-specific expression.

Calcium channel biophysics and pharmacology

Each CaV channel has unique physiological properties and/or pharmacological sensitivities. Within each CaV channel sub-family, additional diversity arises from alternate start sites and alternative pre-mRNA splicing. Lipscombe's early research focused on CaV2.2 (N-type currents) and CaV1 (L-type currents) channels. CaV2.2 channels, located at presynaptic termini of neurons, couple calcium influx to the release of neurotransmitters. In particular, Lipscombe's team characterized a pair of mutually exclusive exons in CaV2.2, exon 37a and exon 37b, which affect both the biophysical and pharmacological properties of CaV2.2 channels. Her team showed that e37a CaV2.2 channels are enriched in a subset of thermal sensing nociceptors of the dorsal root ganglia. They also demonstrated that CaV2.2 channels containing e37a have longer channel open times (compared to e37b-containing isoforms), are expressed at a higher density on the plasma membrane, and are more sensitive to inhibition by G protein coupled receptors. The higher level of ubiquitination of e37b channels and greater sensitivity to the ubiquitin proteasome system, compared to e37a channels explains the difference in plasma membrane density between these splice isoforms. The cell-specific expression of e37a CaV2.2 channels in noxious thermal sensing nociceptors is important for opioid action in the pain pathway.

At postsynaptic sites, CaV1 channels (L-type currents) can couple membrane depolarization to activity-dependent gene expression. In 2001, Lipscombe's lab demonstrated novel features of the neuronal CaV1.3 channels, with important implications for their contribution to control of neuronal function. In 2001, CaV1.2 channels were extensively studied, so the discovery that CaV1.3 channels open at membrane voltages significantly more hyperpolarized than CaV1.2 channels was unexpected and important for understanding their different physiological roles. The unique characteristics of CaV1.3 channels were not recognized previously because others had recorded the activity of cloned CaV1.3 channels using high concentrations of divalent cations to achieve larger currents. These non-physiological recording conditions obscured the true low threshold activation characteristics of CaV1.3 channels; a feature that has turned out to be critically important for their role in pacemaking and for supporting calcium entry into neurons at membrane voltages close to the resting membrane potential. Lipscombe's lab provided calcium ion channel clones including CaV1.3 to many groups facilitated various exciting studies. CaV1.3 is now implicated in Parkinson Disease, and drives pacemaking in several excitable cells.

Expression and regulation of voltage-gated calcium channels

In addition to characterizing CaV channel behavior, Lipscombe's team is also dedicated to investigating how regulation of calcium channel genes and transcripts leads to cell-specific expression patterns of individual CaV channel isoforms. The lab has confirmed multiple mechanisms that control exon selection during the processing of calcium ion channels pre-mRNAs. In a collaboration with Robert Darnell, Lipscombe's lab validated the role of Nova2, a neuronal-specific RNA-binding protein, in controlling tissue and developmental specific alternative splicing of CaV channels in neurons. They also found that Rbfox2, another RNA-binding protein, regulates alternative splicing during development of a cassette exon in Cacna1b, impacting CaV2.2 channel expression levels. In 2020, the lab discovered a novel role of CTCF binding to DNA in nociceptor-specific splicing of Cacna1b exons, and they showed aberrant DNA methylation, disrupted CTCF binding and altered splicing of Cacna1b in nociceptors in neuropathic pain. These experiments informed the field's understanding of the different splicing factors, and epigenetic regulation, that are critical for controlling cell-specific exon inclusion/exclusion during alternative splicing of calcium ion channel pre mRNAs across the nervous system.

Chronic pain

In addition to investigating basic CaV channel function and regulation, Lipscombe also studies the role and regulation of CaV channels in disease states, including chronic pain and psychiatric illness. Over her career, Lipscombe established herself as an expert on how CaV channels participate in the nociceptive pathways and their possibilities as drug targets for treating chronic pain.

By restricting splicing options in Cacna1b by gene targeting in mice, Lipscombe's lab showed that cell-specific control of alternative splicing of Cacna1b impacts animal behavior in vivo. Their research suggests that therapeutics with preferential action on specific CaV2.2 splice isoforms in nociceptors might have improved action while minimizing side effects on CaV2.2 channel isoforms expressed elsewhere in the nervous system.

The mechanism of action of human-disease causing rare variants

In collaborations with colleagues in the Netherlands and the Broad Institute, the Lipscombe Lab discovered the electrophysiological consequences of rare missense variations in CACNA1 genes, CACNA1B and CACNA1I. They showed that a rare CACNA1B mutation identified in a three-generation family with a myoclonus dystonia-like syndrome impacts single CaV2.2 channel activity by altering ion flow. In collaborations with colleagues at the Stanley Center for Psychiatric Research at Broad Institute, the Lipscombe Lab described the electrophysiological consequences of rare missense variations in CACNA1. They also showed that rare de novo variants of CACNA1I linked to schizophrenia impacts membrane trafficking of CaV3.3 with expected alterations in burst firing in thalamic relay neurons.

Tool building

The Lipscombe's lab clones are available through Addgene.

Through a collaboration with Brown University researcher Christopher Moore and other institutions, the Lipscombe Lab is also developing new genetically encoded tools to monitor calcium signals in cells using bioluminescent proteins.
