= Perri Klass =

American pediatrician and writer

- Born: 1958 (age 67–68); Tunapuna, Trinidad
- Occupations: Pediatrician; writer

Academic background
- Education: Harvard University (A.B.); Harvard Medical School (M.D.)

Academic work
- Institutions: New York University

Perri Klass (born 1958) is an American pediatrician and writer who has published extensively about her medical training and pediatric practice. Among her subjects have been the issues of women in medicine, relationships between doctors and patients, and children and literacy. She is the author of both fiction and nonfiction novels, stories, essays, and journalism. Klass is Professor of Journalism and Pediatrics at New York University, and Medical Director of Reach Out and Read, a national childhood literacy program that works through doctors and nurses to encourage parents to read aloud to young children, and to give them the books they need to do it. She is a member of the National Advisory Council of the National Institute of Child Health and Human Development and has been nominated by the President of the United States to the Advisory Board of the National Institute For Literacy.

== Early life and career ==
Klass was born in Tunapuna, Trinidad, where her father, Morton Klass, was doing anthropological field work. She grew up in New York City and Leonia, New Jersey. Her father was an anthropology professor at Barnard College, and her mother a novelist and professor of English at the City University of New York. Klass received her A.B. in Biology from Harvard University in 1979. Klass went on to earn her M.D. from Harvard Medical School in 1986, and she completed her residency in pediatrics at Children's Hospital Boston and her fellowship in pediatric infectious diseases at Boston City Hospital.

== Writing career ==
During her years at Harvard Medical School, Klass began to chronicle her medical training. In 1984, as a third-year medical student, she wrote a series of columns, published in the New York Times in the series of "Hers Columns", describing, among other things, the uncertainty of drawing blood for the very first time, the peculiar locutions of hospital jargon, and the emotional subtext of crying in the hospital. She also wrote, in the New York Times Magazine, about the experience of having a baby while in medical school. She went on to write many articles and columns about her training, originally published in Discover Magazine, American Health, Massachusetts Medicine, and other magazines, and later collected in two books about medical training, A Not Entirely Benign Procedure: Four Years as a Medical Student and Baby Doctor: A Pediatrician's Training.

In addition to her accounts of medical training, her books include a memoir in two voices, Every Mother is a Daughter: the Neverending Quest for Success, Inner Peace, and a Really Clean Kitchen, coauthored with her mother, Sheila Solomon Klass; and Quirky Kids: Understanding and Helping Your Child Who Doesn't Fit In, coauthored with Eileen Costello, MD. Perri Klass’s novels include The Mystery of Breathing, Other Women’s Children (also made into a Lifetime TV movie), and Recombinations. She has also published two collections of short stories, I Am Having An Adventure and Love and Modern Medicine. Her short stories have won five O. Henry Awards. Klass’s most recent non-fiction book, Treatment Kind and Fair: Letters to a Young Doctor was published in 2007; her most recent novel The Mercy Rule, appeared in 2008. Her journalism has appeared in The New York Times Science Section, The New England Journal of Medicine, The Washington Post, Vogue, Gourmet, and many other magazines and newspapers. She writes a regular column in Knitters Magazine, and her knitting essays have been collected in the book Two Sweaters for My Father.

Her 2020 book, A Good Time to Be Born: How Science and Public Health Gave Children a Future, was reviewed favourably by Christie Watson in The New York Times Book Review and Margaret Henderson in the Library Journal.

== Charity work ==
Klass has combined her interest in medicine and literacy to help promote the importance of books to children, through her work with Reach Out and Read. She became involved with Reach Out and Read when it was a single program in a single hospital, and, through her leadership at the National Center, has helped it grow into a national program, now in more than 4,500 locations in all 50 states, distributing more than 6 million books every year to more than 3.8 million children. Klass has trained doctors and nurses around the United States and elsewhere, including Portugal and the Philippines, in strategies to incorporate books and literacy guidance into pediatric primary care.

== Awards and honors ==
While Klass was still a student at Harvard Medical School, her short stories won an O. Henry Award. In 2006, she won the Women's National Book Association Award. In 2007, she received the American Academy of Pediatrics Education Award, which recognized her for educational contributions that have had a broad and positive impact on the health and well being of children. The Academy particularly cited her work with Reach Out and Read. Other awards have included:

- Literarian Award for Outstanding Service, presented by the National Book Foundation (2026)
- Women’s National Book Association Award (2006)
- Legacy Award, Reach Out and Read of Greater New York (2006)
- Women to Watch, Jewish Women International (2006)
- Featured Physician in National Library of Medicine exhibit, Changing the face of Medicine: Celebrating America’s Women Physicians, National Institutes of Health (2003-2005)
- Radcliffe Alumnae Achievement Award (2003)
- Virtual Mentor Award, American Medical Association (2000)
- James Beard Foundation Journalism Award for Magazine Writing on Diet, Nutrition and Health (2000)

Klass has been a member of the National Institute for Literacy Advisory Board and the National Advisory Council of National Institute of Child Health and Human Development.

== Personal life and family ==
She lives in New York City with her husband, history professor Larry Wolff. She has been living and teaching in Florence, Italy, intermittently since about 2018. They have three children.

She is the sister of screenwriter David Klass, with whom she wrote the young adult novel Second Impact, and Judy Klass, playwright and Truman Scholar and Senior Lecturer of Jewish Studies and English at Vanderbilt University. She is the niece of Philip Klass, who wrote science fiction under the name William Tenn.
