= Amy Wyss =

Swiss-American heiress

- Born: May 20, 1971 (age 55)
- Education: Skidmore College
- Spouse: Ed Jaramillo
- Parent: Hansjörg Wyss

Amy E. Wyss (born May 20, 1971) is a Swiss-American heiress, billionaire, and philanthropist. As of 2025, her net worth was estimated at US$2 billion. According to Forbes, "a 2014 U.S. Senate investigation into offshore tax evasion, which did not implicate the Wyss family, revealed her fortune."

Wyss previously served on the board of trustees for the National Outdoor Leadership School as well as the Wyss Foundation, founded by her father Hansjörg Wyss. Wyss and her husband established the LOR Foundation, a rural community fund headquartered in West Chester, Pennsylvania.

== Early life and education ==
Wyss is the daughter of Swiss billionaire Hansjörg Wyss. She graduated from Skidmore College with a bachelor's degree in history and government.

== Career ==
From 2008 to 2012, Wyss served on the board of directors of Synthes, the largest manufacturer of implants to mend bone fractures, that also produces surgical power tools and advanced biomaterials. Her father, Hansjörg Wyss, was the board's chairman. It was sold to Johnson & Johnson in 2012.

Wyss co-founded the Twirl Toy Store in Taos, New Mexico. She was also a co-founder of the Golden Willows Retreat, a bereavement center in Arroyo Hondo, New Mexico.

== Philanthropy ==
Wyss served on the board of trustees of the National Outdoor Leadership School. She also was a member of the board of directors for the Wyss Foundation, an organization founded by her father. The Wyss Foundation provides funding to environmental groups and progressive political advocacy groups.

In 2007, Wyss and her husband established the LOR Foundation. It gives rural community development grants in Taos County, New Mexico, Lander, Wyoming, and Cortez, Colorado.

== Personal life ==
Wyss holds dual U.S.-Swiss citizenship. She resides in Wilson, Wyoming.

She is married to Edward Jaramillo, a native of Taos, New Mexico, who is also a board member of their LOR Foundation and the Wy'East Mountain Academy.
