= Barry Zuckerman =

American pediatrician and writer

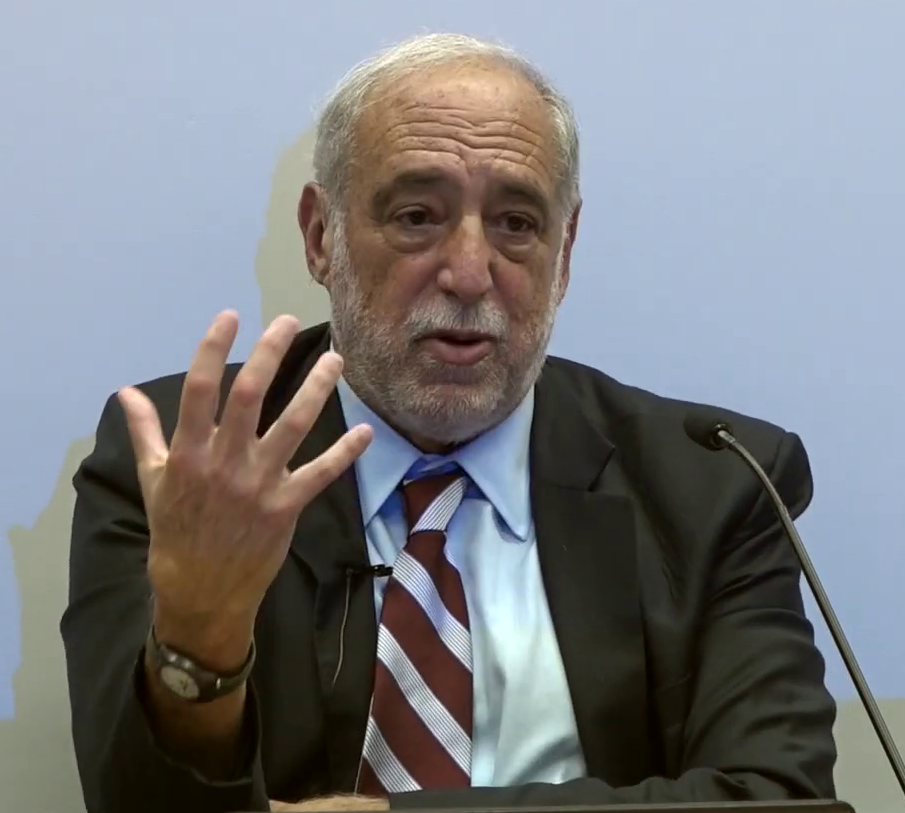

Barry S. Zuckerman is Professor and Chair Emeritus of the Department of Pediatrics at Boston University School of Medicine/Boston Medical Center. He started the Division of Developmental and Behavioral Pediatrics at the Boston University School of Medicine and Boston City Hospital and was one of 12 founders of the Society of Developmental and Behavioral Pediatrics. He was appointed chair of Pediatrics in 1993 and was asked to be First Medical Director of Boston Medical Center when Boston City Hospital merged with University Hospital. He is a co-founder of Reach Out and Read, a national childhood literacy program in the United States, founder of Medical-Legal Partnership, and co-founder of Health Leads, Healthy Steps, and the Nutrition & Fitness for Life pediatric obesity program, all of which have transformed pediatric care for low-income families. Most recently, along with colleagues, he developed a free app for pediatric primary care called "Small Moments, Big Impact" to promote the mother-infant relationship and emotional well-being for low-income mothers from birth through the first six months of their baby's life.

He is the author of over 250 scientific publications addressing the importance of mothers' health and well-being on child health and development, starting with pregnancy. He is the co-editor of numerous books including 4 editions of “The Zuckerman Parker Handbook of Developmental and Behavioral Pediatrics for Primary Care." He was appointed by Senator Ted Kennedy to serve on the National Commission on Children (1989–1992) and later the Carnegie Commission on Young Children. He served on the advisory board of Massachusetts Department of Public Health. He has consulted globally for UNICEF in Turkey and Bangladesh as well as universities in Serbia, Poland, Singapore, Norway and Taiwan.

== Background ==
Barry was born in Brooklyn, NY in 1946 to Anne and Leo Zuckerman. His father graduated Brooklyn College with a major in biochemistry by attending classes for 8 years at night while working during the day. While working at Ortho Pharmaceutical, he was integrally involved in production and quality control of the drug "RhoGam", which has saved millions of babies worldwide from dying from hemolytic disease. Barry's mother Anne graduated high school at age 16 and did not attend college because she had to work during the war to help her family, including her three children, Barry, Elliot, and Diana. Elliot has significant intellectual disability likely related problems from birth. Back then public schools did not accept students with such disabilities and his parents were sting local advocates for improved services for such children. These personal experiences shaped Barry's professional career in his mission to advocate and care for children and families, primarily low income and minority children who needed more help and resources. Barry married his medical school classmate Pam, a wonderful and caring clinician with special expertise in caring for children, especially those complex medical problems. She retired in 2019. They have two Children, Jake and Katherine, and two grandchildren, Julian and Greta. He credits his training in the first primary care training program, followed by a fellowship in child development at Harvard under T. Berry Brazelton, MD, as important sentinel career experiences. Other important training experiences occurred during sabbaticals, including: Hospital for Sick Children in London (1985), Fellowship in Health Policy at Brigham and Woman's Hospital (1992), UCLA and California Endowment (2003), and Fellowship at Stanford's Center for Advanced Study of Behavioral Science (2016–17).

== Education ==
- Rutgers University, New Brunswick, NJ, BA (1968)
- Georgetown University, Washington D.C., MD (1972)
- Pediatric Residency at Boston City Hospital, Boston MA (1972–74)
- Fellow in Primary Care and Child Development, Department of Pediatrics, Boston City Hospital / Boston University School of Medicine, Boston, MA (1974–75)
- Fellow in Child Development at Boston Children's Hospital / Harvard University, Boston, MA (1975–77)

== Awards and honors ==
- Honorary Degree in Education (Ed.D.) and Commencement Speaker at Wheelock College (1996)
- Sunny Days Award, Children's Television Network (1998)
- Edna W. Smith Pioneer in Community Health Care Award (1999)
- The Ambulatory Pediatric Association Public Policy and Advocacy Award (2003)
- Voted Best Doctor by Best Doctors, Inc. (2007)
- The C. Anderson Aldrich Award, American Academy of Pediatrics (2008)
- Robert F. Kennedy Embracing the Legacy Award for Medical-Legal Partnership (2008)
- Ashoka Fellow (2010)
- APA Health Care Delivery Award to the Department of Pediatrics (2014)
- The Joseph St. Geme Jr. Award for Outstanding Leadership in Academic Pediatrics from Federation of Pediatric Organizations (2015)
- Center for Advanced Study of Behavioral Science at Stanford (2016–17)

== Selected bibliography ==
=== Publications (Peer-Reviewed) ===
- Hingson, R, Alpert, JJ, Day, N, Dooling, E, Kayne, H, Morelock, S, Oppenheimer, E, Rosett, H, Weiner, L, Zuckerman, BS. Effects of Maternal Drinking and Marijuana Use on Fetal Growth and Development. Pediatrics, 70:539, 1982. PMID 6981792
- Zuckerman, BS, Hingson, R, Alpert, JJ, Dooling, E, Kayne, H, Morelock, S, Oppenheimer, E. Neonatal Outcome-Is Adolescent Pregnancy a Risk Factor? Pediatrics, 71:489,1983.
- Zuckerman, DM, Zuckerman, BS. Impact of Television on Children. Pediatrics, 75:233,1985.
- Zuckerman BS, Frank D, Hingson R, Morelock S, Kayne H. Impact of Maternal Working During Pregnancy on Neonatal Outcome. Pediatrics, 77:459-464, 1986.
- Zuckerman, BS, Beardslee, W. Maternal Depression: An Issue for Pediatricians, Pediatrics, 79:110-117, 1987.
- Zuckerman, B, Stevenson, J, Bailey, V. Sleep Problems in Early Childhood Continuities, Predictive Factors and Behavioral Correlates. Pediatrics, 80:664-671, 1987.
- Frank, D, Zuckerman, B, Reece, H, Amaro, H, Hingson, R, Fried, L, Cabral, H, Levenson, S, Kayne, H, Vinci, R, Bauchner, H, Parker, S. Cocaine Use During Pregnancy: Prevalence and Correlates. Pediatrics, 82:888-895, 1988.
- Zuckerman, B, Frank, D, Hingson, R, Amaro, H, Levenson, S, Parker, S, Vinci, R, Kyei-Aboagye, K, Fried, L, Cabral, H, Timperi, R, Bauchner, H. Effects of Maternal Marijuana and Cocaine Use on Fetal Growth. N Engl J Med, 320:762-768, 1989.
- Cabral, H, Fried, LE, Levenson, S, Amaro, H, Zuckerman, B. Foreign and U.S. Born Black Women: Differences in Health Behaviors and Birth Outcomes. Am J Public Health, 80:70-72, 1990.
- Amaro, H, Fried, LE, Cabral, H, Zuckerman, B. Violence During Pregnancy: The Relationship to Drug Use Among Women and Their Partners. Am J Public Health, 80:575-579, 1990. PMID 2327535
- Needlman R, Fried LE, Morley DS, Taylor, S, Zuckerman, B. Clinic-Based Intervention to Promote Literacy. AJDC, 145:881-884, 1991.
- Mayes, LC, Granger, RH, Bornstein, MH, Zuckerman, B. The Problem of Prenatal Cocaine Exposure: A Rush to Judgment. JAMA, 267:406-408, 1992.
- Adair, R, Bauchner, H, Phillip, B, Levenson, S, Zuckerman, B. Reducing Night Waking in Infancy: A Primary Care Intervention, Pediatrics, 89:585, 1992.
- Zuckerman, B and Frank, D. Crack Kids: Not Broken. Pediatrics, 89:337-339, 1992.
- Groves, BM, Zuckerman B, Marans, S, Cohen, D. Silent Victims: Children Who Witness Violence. JAMA, 269:262-4, 1993. PMID 7678044
- Zuckerman, B, Augustyn, M, Groves, B, Parker, S. Silent Victims Revisited: The Special Case of Domestic Violence. Pediatrics, 96:511-513, 1995. PMID 7544457
- Wang, X, Zuckerman, B, Coffman, G, Corwin, M. Familial Aggregation of Low Birth Weight Among Whites and Blacks in the United States. N Engl J Med, 333:1744-1749, 1995.
- Linares LO, Groves B, Greenberg J, Bronfman E, Augustyn M, Zuckerman B. Restraining Orders: A Frequent Marker of Adverse Maternal Health. Pediatrics. 104(2):249-57, 1999.
- Frank D, Augustyn M, Grant-Knight W, Pell T, Zuckerman B. Growth, Development, and Behavior in Early Childhood Following Prenatal Cocaine Exposure. JAMA. 285(12): 1613–1625, 2001.
- Linares LO, Heeren T, Bronfman E, Zuckerman B, Augustyn M, Tronick E. A Mediational Model for the Impact of Exposure to Community Violence on Early Child Behavior Problems. Child Development. 72(2): 639–652, 2001. PMID 11333090
- Wang X, Zuckerman B, Pearson C, Kaufman G, Chen C, Wang G, Niu T, Wise PH, Bauchner H, Xu X. Maternal Cigarette Smoking, Metabolic Gene Polymorphism, and Infant Birth Weight. JAMA. 287(2): 195–202, 2002.
- Zuckerman B, Frank D, Mayes L. Cocaine-Exposed Infants and Developmental Outcome: “Crack Kids” Revisited. JAMA. 287(15): 1990–1991, 2002.
- Kahn RS, Zuckerman B, Bauchner H, Homer CJ, Wise PH. Women's health after pregnancy and child outcomes at age 3: a prospective cohort study. Am J Public Health. 2002;92(8):1312-1318.
- Flores G, Barton Laws M, Mayo SJ, Zuckerman B, Abreu M, Medina L, Hardt EJ. Errors in Medical Interpretation and Their Potential Clinical Consequences in Pediatric Encounters. Pediatrics. 111(1): 6–14, 2003.
- Zuckerman B, Sandel M, Smith L, Lawton E. Why Pediatricians Need Lawyers to Keep Children Healthy. Pediatrics. 2004;114(1):224-228.
- Zuckerman B, Parker S, Kaplan-Sanoff M, Augustyn M, Barth M. Healthy Steps: A Case Study of Innovation in Pediatric Practice. Pediatrics. 2004;114(3):820-826.
- Smith L, Oyeku S, Homer C, Zuckerman B. Sickle Cell Disease: A Question of Equity and Quality. Pediatrics. 2006;117:1763-1770.
- McPhillips H, Stanton B, Zuckerman B, Stapleton B. Role of a Pediatric Department Chair: Factors Leading to Satisfaction and Burnout. J Pediatr, Oct 2007;151(4):425-434.
- Duursma E, Augustyn M, Zuckerman B. Reading aloud to children: The evidence. Arch Dis Child, July 2008;93(7):554-7.
- Zuckerman B, Sandel M, Lawton E, Morton S. Medical-Legal Partnership: transforming health care. Lancet, Nov 2008;372(9650):1615-7.
- Zuckerman B. Promoting Early Literacy in Pediatric Practice: Twenty Years of Reach Out and Read. Pediatrics, Dec 2009;124(6):1660-1665.
- Zuckerman B, Margolis P, Mate K. Health Services Innovation: The Time is Now. JAMA, Mar 2013; 309(11): 1113–1114.
- Bair-Merritt M, Zuckerman B, Augustyn M, Cronholm PF. Silent Victims – An Epidemic of Childhood Exposure to Domestic Violence. N Engl J Med Oct 2013; 369:1673-1675.
- Zuckerman B. Growing Up Poor: A Pediatric Response. Acad Pediatr. 2014 Sep Oct;14(5):431-5. PMID 24942932.
- Wang, G. et al. Weight Gain in Infancy and Overweight or Obesity in Childhood across the Gestational Spectrum: a Prospective Birth Cohort Study. Sci. Rep. 6, 29867; doi: 10.1038/srep29867 (2016).
- Rowe M, Zuckerman B. Word Gap Redux: Developmental Sequence and Quality. JAMA Pediatr. 2016;170(9):827-828.
- Mueller C, Rowe ML, Zuckerman B. Mindset Matters for Parents and Adolescents. JAMA Pediatr. 2017; 171(5):415-416. doi: 10.1001/jamapediatrics.2016.5160
- Raghavan R, Riley AW, Volk H, Caruso D, Hironaka L, Sices L, Hong X, Wang G, Ji Y, Brucato M, Wahl A, Stivers T, Pearson C, Zuckerman B, Stuart EA, Landa R, Fallin MD, Wang X. Maternal Multivitamin Intake, Plasma Folate and Vitamin B12 Levels and Autism Spectrum Disorder Risk in Offspring. Paediatr Perinat Epidemiol. 2017 Oct 06. PMID 28984369.
- Maroney T and Zuckerman B. “The Talk,” Physician Version: Special Considerations for African American, Male Adolescents. Pediatrics. Jan 2018;141(2):e20171462.
- Marcil LE, Hole MK, Wenren LM, Schuler MS, Zuckerman BS, Vinci RJ. Free Tax Services in Pediatric Clinics. Pediatrics. Jun 2018;141(6): e20173608.
- Zuckerman B and Wong SL. Family History: An Opportunity to Disrupt Transmission of Behavioral Health Problems. Pediatrics. 2019;143(6):e20183383.
- Silverstein M, Howell EA, Zuckerman B. Cannabis Use in Pregnancy: A Tale of 2 Concerns. JAMA. 2019;322(2):121–122. doi:10.1001/jama.2019.8860.
- Biel MG, Tang MH, Zuckerman B. Pediatric Mental Health Care Must Be Family Mental Health Care. JAMA Pediatr. Published online April 6, 2020. doi:10.1001/jamapediatrics.2020.0065.
- Zuckerman B and Needlman R. 30 Years of Reach Out and Read: Need for a Developmental Perspective. Pediatrics. 2020;145(6):e20191958.

=== Publications (Non-Peer Reviewed) ===
- Brazelton TB, Parker WB, Zuckerman BS. The Importance of Behavioral Assessment of the Neonate. Current Problems in Pediatrics, December, 1976.
- Zuckerman, B and Parker S. “Teachable Moments: Assessment as Intervention.” Contemporary Pediatrics, 103–118, 1997.
- Zuckerman B, Kahn R. “Pathways to Early Child Health and Development.” In Securing the Future: Investing in Children from Birth to College, edited by Sheldon Danziger and Jane Waldfogel. New York: Russell Sage Press, 87–121, 2000.
- Zuckerman B, Halfon N. (2003). School Readiness: An Idea Whose Time Has Arrived. Pediatrics, 111(6): 1433–1436.
- Zuckerman B, Zuckerman P. The Pediatrician as Ghostbuster: Angels Voices and Kisses. Infant Mental Health Journal; 26(6):529-532, 2005.

=== Books ===
- Green M, Brazelton TB, Fine L, Korsch B, Nelson K, Willis D, Zuckerman B. Guidelines for Health Supervision. Evanston, IL: American Academy of Pediatrics; 1985.
- Zuckerman, B, Weitzman, M, Alpert, JJ. Children at Risk: Current Social and Medical Challenges. Pediatric Clinics of North America, WB Saunders, Volume 35, No. 6, 1988.
- Fitzgerald, HE, Lester, BM, Zuckerman, B. Children of Poverty: Research, Health and Policy Issues. New York, NY: Garland Publishing, Inc; 1995.
- Zuckerman B, Lieberman A, Fox N. Emotional Regulation and Developmental Health: Infancy and Early Childhood. Johnson & Johnson Pediatric Institute, LLC; 2002.
- Augustyn M, Zuckerman B, Caronna E. The Zuckerman Parker Handbook of Developmental and Behavioral Pediatrics for Primary Care. 3rd Edition. Philadelphia, PA: Lippincott, Williams & Wilkins; 2010.
- Tobin Tyler E, Lawton E, Conroy K, Sandel M, Zuckerman B. Poverty, Health and Law: Readings and Cases for Medical-Legal Partnership. Durham, NC: Carolina Academic Press; 2011.

=== Newspaper Articles ===
- Appel, Adrianne. “Doctors, Other Advocates Start Push for Children's Health Bill.” The Boston Globe, 28 Sept. 1994, p. 7.
- Diamant, Anita. “Zuckerman Unbound.” The Boston Globe, 25 Dec. 1994, p. 282.
- Goldberg, Carey. “Taking Pains for Children.” The Boston Globe, 1 Nov. 2002, p. 1.
- Kang, Dolores. “Hospital Board Appoints Officers.” The Boston Globe, 31 Mar. 1995, p. 37.
- Leroux, Charles, and Cindy Schreuder. “Where Have All the Drug Babies Gone?” Chicago Tribune, 1 Nov. 1994, p. 13.
- Lupo, Alan. “Helping Poor Children Feel Better.” The Boston Globe, 26 June 1994, p. 252.
- Ribadeneira, Diego. “Boston City Hospital Pediatricians' Project Spots Problems Early.” The Boston Globe, 30 July 1989, p. 205.
- Rosenberg, Tina. “When Poverty Makes You Sick, a Lawyer Can Be the Cure.” The New York Times, 17 July 2014.
- Smith, Stephen. “Patrick Chooses Health Council.” The Boston Globe, 21 Apr. 2007, p. 15.
- Weld, Elizabeth New. “Pediatricians, Educators Team up at BCH.” The Boston Globe, 23 Nov. 1986, p. 273.
- Wong, Doris Sue. “For City Youths, a Can-Do Attitude.” The Boston Globe, 10 Aug. 1998, p. 17.
- Zuckerman, Barry. “The High Cost of Neglecting Health Care for Low-Income Children.” The Boston Globe, 21 May 1993, p. 13.
- Zuckerman, Barry. “Merger: Ensuring Care for City's Poor.” The Boston Globe, 9 Apr. 1996, p. 40.
- Zuckerman, Barry. “Sugar Tax Is Sweet Deal for Health of Children.” The Boston Globe, 19 Aug. 2009, p. A11.
- Zuckerman, Barry, and Ellen Lawton. “A Partnership for Kids' Health.” The Boston Globe, 25 July 2002, p. 11.
- Zuckerman, Barry, and Katherine Gergen Barnett. “The Multitude and Magnitude of Coronavirus Stressors on Children.” The Boston Globe, 7 Aug. 2020, p. A10.
- Zuckerman, Barry, and Perri Klass. “Reaching out to Create Readers.” The Boston Globe, 10 Apr. 2005, p. 52.
- Zuckerman, Barry, and Shari Barkin. “Medical-Legal Partnerships Give Patients New Clout.” The Tennessean, 10 May 2012, p. A10.
- Zuckman, Jill. “Clinton Coy about Senate Race as She Boosts Reading Program.” The Boston Globe, 5 June 1999, p. 13.
