= Community Rights Counsel =

Defunct American law firm

The Community Rights Counsel was an American non-profit, public interest law firm formed in 1997 by the late Doug Kendall. Its general aim was to assist communities in protecting their health and welfare. The organization's legal work focused on the intersection of environmental and constitutional law, filing frequent amicus briefs in cases defending governmental action against claims of "regulatory takings."

== Activities ==
The group promoted judicial ethics, exposing the practice of judges attending junkets sponsored by right wing think tanks that espoused free market anti-regulatory philosophies. Their findings were published in two reports, Nothing for Free: How Private Judicial Seminars Are Undermining Environmental Protections and Breaking the Public's Trust (July 2000), and Tainted Justice: How Private Judicial Trips Undermine Public Trust in the Federal Judiciary (March 2004). A version of Tainted Justice was published in the Georgetown Journal of Legal Ethics 18:65-134.

The group has since been absorbed into the Constitutional Accountability Center, a legal advocacy group.

== Cases ==
The group filed many amicus briefs in state and federal appellate courts and the Supreme Court supporting the federal government. Among their notable briefs was an amicus submission in Gonzales v. Raich (2005). The case concerned whether the federal government had the power to regulate medical marijuana under the Constitution's Commerce Clause, which is the basis of federal authority for many health, safety, welfare, and environmental statutes. Had the federal government lost, many federal laws and regulations might not be enforceable except by a state-level action.
