= Lorin Crawford =

- Education: Duke University; Clark Atlanta University
- Scientific career
- Fields: Biostatistics, Statistical Science
- Workplaces: Brown University School of Public Health; Carney Institute for Brain Science
- Doctoral advisor: Sayan Mukherjee, Kris C. Wood

Lorin Crawford is the RGSS Assistant Professor of Biostatistics at Brown University. He is affiliated with the Center for Statistical Sciences, Center for Computational Molecular Biology, and the Robert J. and Nancy D. Carney Institute for Brain Science. His scientific research interests involve the development of novel and efficient computational methodologies to address complex problems in statistical genetics, cancer pharmacology, and radiomics (e.g. cancer imaging).

== Professional career ==
Crawford received his PhD from the Department of Statistical Science at Duke University in 2017. He received his Bachelors of Science degree in Mathematics at Clark Atlanta University in 2013.

== Awards and honors ==
- 2019: Named one of Forbes' 30 Under 30
- 2019: The Root 100 Most Influential African Americans
- 2019: Alfred P. Sloan Research Fellowship
- 2020: Honoree for Mathematically Gifted and Black
- 2020: Packard Fellowship in Science and Engineering
