= Berger Action Fund =

Liberal advocacy group

- Formation: 2007; 19 years ago
- Purpose: Lobbying and advocacy
- Headquarters: Washington, D.C.
- President: Molly McUsic
- Board of directors: John Leshy; Courtney Cuff; Robert Bland
- Budget: $59.7 million (2024)
- Website: bergeractionfund.org
- Formerly called: Wyss Action Fund

The Berger Action Fund is a 501(c)(4) nonprofit liberal advocacy group based in Washington, D.C. It is associated with the Wyss Foundation, which is the funding vehicle of Swiss billionaire Hansjörg Wyss. The Berger Action Fund has been a major donor to the Sixteen Thirty Fund, which is a hub of undisclosed political spending ("dark money") on the American Left. The New York Times wrote that the Berger Action Fund is part of Wyss' "sophisticated political operation to advance progressive policy initiatives and the Democrats who support them." The Berger Action Fund has donated nearly $500 million to left-leaning nonprofits.

The Berger Action Fund shares facilities and staff with the Wyss Foundation. Molly McUsic serves as the president of both the Berger Action Fund and the Wyss Foundation. Because of the way it is registered under the U.S. tax code, the Berger Action Fund is allowed to spend money supporting and opposing political candidates. Berger states that it has policies against such spending for candidates or parties. Wyss's political giving has come under scrutiny since foreign nationals without permanent residency are prohibited from donating directly to federal political candidates or political action committees.

== History and activities ==
The Associated Press wrote that "The Berger Action Fund is a nondescript name for a group with a rather specific purpose: steering the wealth of Hansjörg Wyss, a Swiss billionaire, into the world of American politics and policy." As a foreign national, Wyss is prohibited by U.S. law from donating to candidates or political committees. He is able to donate to "dark money" groups that are not required to disclose the sources of their funding. Wyss' status as a foreign national spending large sums of money to influence U.S. politics has attracted controversy.

The Berger Action Fund donated more than $10.8 million to the Sixteen Thirty Fund in 2016 and 2017. During this time period, the Sixteen Thirty Fund donated to super PACs that promoted Joe Biden and attacked Donald Trump. In 2020, the Berger Action Fund gave $56 million to other groups on the left, including $31 million to the Sixteen Thirty Fund. In 2021, Wyss gave $72 million through the Berger Action Fund, "cementing Wyss' status as a Democratic-aligned megadonor." In 2022, the Berger Action Fund gave $63 million in grants, including $35 million to the Sixteen Thirty Fund.

In 2024, John Podesta, then serving as an environmental advisor to President Joe Biden, met with Berger Action Fund president Molly McUsic at the White House. Podesta has disclosed receiving consulting income from the Wyss Foundation.

== Recipients ==
Groups that have received $1 million or more from the Berger Action Fund include:

- Sixteen Thirty Fund
- Fund for a Better Future
- League of Conservation Voters
- Center for Popular Democracy
- Indivisible Project
- Western Conservation Action
- National Redistricting Action Fund
- Our American Future Action
- American Progress Action Fund
- WorkMoney Inc.
- American Civil Liberties Union
- Community Catalyst Action Fund
- Moms Rising Together
- Color of Change
- Planned Parenthood
- New Venture Fund
- Animal Wellness Action
- Accelerate Action Inc.
- SuperMajority Education Fund
