= Michael J. Frank =

- Education: Queen's University at Kingston; University of Colorado Boulder
- Scientific career
- Workplaces: Brown University; Carney Institute for Brain Science

Michael Joshua Frank is a neuroscientist who has played a leading role in computational cognitive neuroscience, in the understanding of the dopamine system across species, and in the emerging field of computational psychiatry. He is currently the Edgar L. Marston Professor of Cognitive and Psychological Sciences at Brown University and Director of the Nancy G Zimmerman Center for Computational Brain Science at Brown's Carney Institute for Brain Science. Other honors include: Kavli Fellow (2016), the Cognitive Neuroscience Society Young Investigator Award (2011), and the Janet T Spence Award for early career transformative contributions (Association for Psychological Science, 2010).

Frank earned a Bachelor of Science in electrical engineering from Queen's University at Kingston in 1997. He received a Master of Science in electrical engineering and doctorate in neuroscience and psychology from the University of Colorado Boulder.

In 2021, Frank received a Troland Research Award from the National Academy of Sciences for his "groundbreaking discoveries in our understanding of learning, valuation, and cognitive control."
