= Hansjörg Wyss =

Swiss businessman and Democratic megadonor

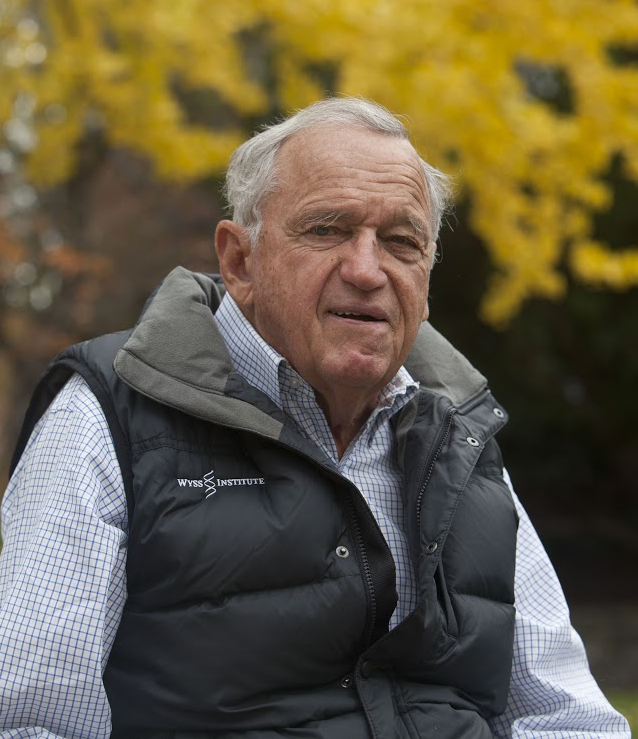
- Born: Johann Georg Wyss; 19 September 1935 (age 91); Bern, Switzerland
- Citizenship: Switzerland
- Education: ETH Zurich (BS, MS); Harvard University (MBA)
- Title: Former CEO, Synthes; Chairman, Wyss Foundation; Co-owner, Chelsea
- Children: Amy Wyss

Johann Georg "Hansjörg" Wyss (Swiss Standard German pronunciation: [ˈhɑnsˌjœrɡ ˈʋiːs]; born 19 September 1935) is a Swiss billionaire businessman and donor to politically liberal and environmental causes in the United States. He is the founder and former president and chairman of Synthes Holding, a medical device manufacturer. His Wyss Foundation has nearly $2 billion in assets.

As of 2025, Forbes estimated his net worth at US$4.8 billion, while Bloomberg estimated $12.7 billion. Having donated hundreds of millions of dollars to environmental causes, he has more recently increased his donations to groups promoting progressive causes. In 2024, Wyss additionally donated $100 million to the City of Berne which bequeathed honorary citizenship on him. In the United States, Wyss is a major donor to organizations aligned with the Democratic Party. Wyss's political giving has come under scrutiny since foreign nationals without permanent residency in the United States are prohibited from donating directly to federal political candidates or political action committees.

He is the co-owner of Premier League football club Chelsea. He is one of the anchor shareholders of Lalique Group, with Müller Handels AG Schweiz, Dharampal Satyapal Limited, Hansjörg Wyss and Claudio Denz, they hold 42.67% of Lalique Group shares. In 2019, Hansjörg Wyss and Swiss entrepreneur Silvio Denz acquired the historic Glenturret Distillery in Scotland. On 4 September 2024, Wyss became a major shareholder in Lalique holding 5.9%.

== Early life and career ==
Wyss was born in Bern, Switzerland, on 19 September 1935. His father was a salesman and his mother a homemaker. He was brought up in a flat with two sisters. After receiving a master's degree in civil and structural engineering from the Swiss Federal Institute of Technology Zurich in 1959, Wyss earned an MBA from Harvard Business School in 1965. Following that, he worked in various positions in the textile industry, including as a factory engineer and project manager for Chrysler in Pakistan, Turkey and the Philippines.

Wyss also worked in the steel industry in Brussels, Belgium. During his time working in that industry, Wyss ran a side business selling airplanes. Through one sale, he met a surgeon who had co-founded Swiss medical device manufacturer Synthes. After that meeting, Wyss spent two years learning about the medical device industry. He then founded and became president of Synthes USA in 1977.

== Synthes USA ==
In 1977, Wyss founded and became president of Synthes USA, the U.S. division of the Switzerland-based Synthes, a medical device manufacturer making internal screws and plates for broken bones. He founded the company after meeting Martin Allgoewer, the founder of AO Foundation, and obtaining permission to sell the organization's devices in the Americas. In an early initiative, Wyss opened a Synthes USA manufacturing plant in Colorado. Prior to that, another Swiss company manufactured Synthes' devices and exported them to the U.S. Under Wyss' control, the U.S. division expanded its sales team and trained surgeons how to use its products. Wyss served as Synthes' worldwide CEO and chairman until his resignation as CEO in 2007. He maintained his post as company chairman until Johnson & Johnson acquired Synthes in 2012. During his tenure, Wyss said discussions of new products made up one-third of board meetings. A manager assigned to the Norian project testified before a grand jury that "for somebody who is at his level and his level of success, I would say he [Wyss] has a surprising amount of contact with what's going on". Staff recalled meetings in which he intensively probed their projects.

In 2009, top executives at Synthes were indicted by U.S. Attorneys for Eastern Pennsylvania for using an untested calcium-phosphate-based bone cement on human patients without authorization from the Food and Drug Administration. Use of the bone cement resulted in the deaths of three people. Wyss was not indicted, but four top executives of Synthes were convicted and sentenced to prison terms.

In 2012, Wyss sold the company for $19.7 billion in cash and stock to Johnson & Johnson. According to Bloomberg, he received 97.4 million shares in Johnson & Johnson and $3.2 billion cash from the deal.

== Philanthropy ==
According to Forbes, Wyss is "among the most philanthropic people in the world". Between 2004 and 2008, Businessweek estimated that Wyss personally donated nearly US$277 million. His giving increased subsequent to the sale of Synthes in 2012. In 2013, he signed The Giving Pledge, agreeing to give away the majority of his fortune. The assets of his charitable foundations equal nearly $2 billion.

He has made major donations to environmental and scientific causes, as well as progressive organizations, including the Center for Budget and Policy Priorities, Health Leads and the Constitutional Accountability Center.

In 2019, Wyss promised to donate 20 million Swiss francs to the Bern Art Museum. He made it a condition that the Hodlerstrasse, on which the museum is located, be free of cars.

In 2024, the Wyss Foundation gave the Museum of Fine Arts, Boston $25 million to renovate four modern-art galleries made up of more than 5,000 square feet and in order to fund two additional staff positions, a conservator as well as a curator.

=== Environmentalism ===
As of 2015, Wyss and the Wyss Foundation had donated more than $350 million to environmental protection, including conservation of national forests and other public lands in the Western United States.

In October 2018, Wyss published an article in The New York Times stating that he was contributing $1 billion to environmental causes.

Wyss has said that he became passionate about the American West and land preservation after visiting the U.S. in 1958 as a student and taking a summer job as a surveyor with the Colorado Highway Department.

In 1998, he created the Wyss Foundation. The objective of the foundation was to establish and sponsor informal partnerships between non-governmental organizations and the United States government, in order to place large swathes of land under permanent protection in the American West. The organization sponsors the Wyss Scholars Program for graduate-level education in conservation.

The landscape protection strategies of the foundation have included assisting the purchase of mineral leases from oil and gas companies. Other causes the Wyss Foundation supports include river restorations, ocean conservation in Peru and Canada, anti-poaching efforts in Africa and environmental journalism. In 2017, the organization announced a charitable commitment of $65 million to African Parks, a conservation nonprofit overseeing ten parks in seven African nations, to help create new protected areas in Africa.

In 2010, Wyss gave The Nature Conservancy $35 million to purchase 310,000 acres in Montana as part of one of the largest private conservation purchases in the United States. In 2013, he donated $4.25 million to The Trust for Public Land for the purchase of oil and gas leases in Wyoming to prevent development in the Hoback Basin. In 2016, Wyss made another donation to the Trust for Public Land that resulted in the expansion of Saguaro National Park in Arizona by 300 acres, including a mile and a half of Rincon Creek.

Wyss is involved with The Wilderness Society and Rails-to-Trails. He serves on the boards of the Southern Utah Wilderness Alliance, the Center for American Progress, and the Grand Canyon Trust. Wyss has donated more than $6 million to the Center for American Progress. In 2011, Wyss won the Robert Marshall Award from The Wilderness Society for his conservation work.

In January 2015, the conservative U.S. news site The Daily Caller accused John Podesta, who was at the time an advisor on environmental issues to the Obama administration, of an alleged ethics violation for pushing the advocacy agenda of a former employer because, previously, he had received $87,000 as a consulting fee for work he did in 2013 for the HJW Foundation (a Wyss organization that later was merged with the Wyss Foundation). According to the High Country News, "nothing ever came of the accusations".

In 2018, Wyss donated $1 billion to the Wyss Campaign for Nature, aiming to conserve 30% of the world's land and oceans by 2030. In September 2021, Wyss donated an additional $500 million to conservation, announcing it would commit to protecting 30% of the planet by 2030.

=== Scientific research ===
In 2007, he received the Harvard Business School Alumni Achievement Award, and in the fall of 2008, it was announced that Wyss donated the largest single endowment from one source in the history of Harvard, when he gave $125 million to found a multidisciplinary institute, the Wyss Institute for Biologically Inspired Engineering at Harvard University.

In 2012–13, he announced the creation of the Campus Biotech and of its Wyss Center for Bio- and Neuro-engineering in Geneva, Switzerland. In 2014, Wyss donated $120 million to the Swiss Federal Institute of Technology Zurich and the University of Zurich for the Wyss Translational Center Zurich.

In May 2013, the Wyss Institute for Biologically Inspired Engineering at Harvard University received an additional $125 million from Wyss.

In 2019, Wyss donated a further $131 million to Harvard Business School to support the Wyss Institute.

In 2020, Wyss donated CHF 100 million to support the Wyss Academy for Nature at the University of Bern.

In May 2022, Wyss received the Swiss-American Chamber of Commerce's Gallatin Award for his support of scientific research. He has provided more than CHF500 million over the last ten years to research initiatives connected with the Wyss centers and academies in Geneva, Bern and Zurich.

In October 2022, Wyss gave the Wyss Institute for Biologically Inspired Engineering $350 million, bringing the cumulative amount of support provided to over $700 million.

In October 2025, Wyss gave Boston Children's Hospital $35 million through the Wyss Medical Foundation. The gift went to the hospital's translational neuroscience center, which works on treatments for rare brain disorders in children, and the center was renamed the Rosamund Stone Zander and Hansjoerg Wyss Translational Neuroscience Center. His late wife, Rosamund Stone Zander, had made a large gift to the center in 2020. The new money pays for clinical trials, pilot studies and fellowships for doctors who run trials.

== Political activities ==
In 2015, Wyss publicly declared that he was in favor of higher inheritance taxes for the wealthy in Switzerland.

Wyss is a member of the Democracy Alliance, a club of liberal donors.

There has been a longstanding rivalry between billionaire Wyss, who supports liberal politics, and billionaire Christoph Blocher, who supports conservative politics. Both entered into public debates about the bilateral agreements between Switzerland and the European Union as well as the limitation of immigration into Switzerland. Wyss advocated openness toward the EU and immigrants while Blocher advocated for Switzerland's independence in those matters.

=== The Hub Project and Arabella Advisors ===
In 2021, The New York Times reported that Wyss had "quietly created a sophisticated political operation to advance progressive policy initiatives and the Democrats who support them". In 2015, the Wyss Foundation initiated The Hub Project, which seeks "to shape media coverage to help Democratic causes". The goal of The Hub Project is to help Democrats be more effective at conveying their arguments through the news media and directly to voters. It seeks to "dramatically shift the public debate and policy positions of core decision makers".

The Hub Project is part of Arabella Advisors, which also sponsors the New Venture Fund and the Sixteen Thirty Fund. Wyss has donated $245 million to the Sixteen Thirty Fund and the New Venture Fund since 2016. The Sixteen Thirty Fund gives directly to political committees and pays for TV ads that back specific candidates and causes. In 2022, the FEC said the Sixteen Thirty Fund should be required to register as a political committee, which would require more disclosure.

In December 2024, the U.S. House of Representatives held a hearing on the threat of foreign interference in U.S. elections. While federal law prohibits foreign nationals from donating to political candidates, campaigns, or super PACs, there is a loophole allowing foreign nationals to finance ballot measures. The Sixteen Thirty Fund, largely funded by Wyss, has spent over $130 million on ballot measures in 25 states.

In February 2026, the House Ways and Means Committee held another hearing on foreign money in American nonprofits. In July 2026, the committee approved the Stopping Foreign Influence in Elections Act of 2026 (H.R. 9771) by 23 votes to 16. The bill would tax large nonprofits that take money from foreign nationals and then give to political committees or 501(c)(4) groups. The committee also passed the Foreign Funding Transparency Act (H.R. 9772), which would require tax-exempt organizations to report foreign donations to the IRS.

=== Bid for Tribune Publishing ===
In 2021, along with Stewart W. Bainum Jr., Wyss made a bid to buy Tribune Publishing, which publishes newspapers including The Chicago Tribune and The Baltimore Sun. The New York Times reported that "the big-money activism of Mr. Wyss and Mr. Bainum highlights concerns that wealthy owners may try to influence news coverage to advance their political agendas", and on April 14, 2021, they identified him as the top bidder. On April 17, 2021, Wyss backed out of the potential deal while Bainum Jr. continued to seek alternate investors in his bid to buy Tribune Publishing.

=== Berger Action Fund ===
In 2023, the Associated Press published an article about the steering of Wyss's wealth into U.S. politics and policy. As a Swiss citizen, Wyss is legally prohibited from directly donating to U.S. political candidates or committees. Between 1990 and 2006, he donated $119,000 directly to candidates and political committees. The Federal Election Commission declined to take action against him, and the statute of limitations has passed. The Associated Press found that Wyss's "influence is still broadly felt through millions of dollars routed through a network of nonprofit groups that invest heavily in the Democratic ecosystem. Such groups don't have to disclose the source of their funding — or many details about how they spend it." One vehicle for Wyss's political donations is the Berger Action Fund, which has donated $339 million to left-leaning nonprofits since 2016. The majority of the Berger Action Fund's $72 million expenditures in 2021 went to building public support for Joe Biden's agenda and thereby "cementing Wyss' status as a Democratic-aligned megadonor."

== Personal life ==
Wyss has been married twice. He divorced his first wife and was widowed by his second wife in 2023.

In 2014, Wyss said he carried only a Swiss passport and did not have a U.S. green card. As of 2021, The New York Times wrote, he "has not disclosed publicly whether he holds citizenship or permanent residency" in the U.S.

Wyss lives in Wyoming. His daughter, Amy, is also a resident of Wyoming. Wyss is a hiker, skier, and backpacker. He also is a hobby pilot. He is involved in outdoor education programs and he funds efforts to conserve wildlife habitat and public lands in the Rocky Mountains.

In 2000, Wyss purchased the 900-acre (3.6 km^{2}) Halter Ranch and Vineyard in western Paso Robles, California. The ranch includes an 1,800-acre wildlife reserve and a 281-acre vineyard producing 13 varietals of grapes using methods that are "Sustainability in Practice" certified. The ranch hosts tours and was named "Best Vineyard Experience" by Sunset in 2015.

As of 2023, Wyss ranked 523 on the Forbes list of billionaires, with an estimated net worth of approximately $4.7 billion. He ranks number 218 on the Bloomberg list of billionaires.

On May 6, 2022, Chelsea announced that the club agreed to terms with a new ownership group, of which Wyss is a member. The acquisition was completed on May 30, 2022.

In May 2025, a 30-year-old former employee filed a lawsuit against Wyss, alleging that he had repeatedly sexually harassed her. In 2013, Wyss paid a former foundation staff member $1.5 million after she accused him of sexual abuse. The former staff member signed a nondisclosure agreement. Wyss characterized the alleged abuse as a relationship between consenting adults that ended badly.

The former employee's husband, who had managed Halter Ranch for six years, sued Wyss separately, saying he was owed up to $30 million in equity in the winery. Wyss answered with a cross complaint, which argued that the husband should have reported the harassment claims to the company. On 8 August 2025, both lawsuits and the cross-complaint were dismissed.
