= Michael Huggins =

Founder and Executive Director of Transformation Yoga Project

Michael Huggins (born 1957) is the American founder and Executive Director of Transformation Yoga Project, a non-profit organization teaching yoga and mindfulness as a tool for personal change in the lives of people within drug and alcohol rehabilitation facilities, the criminal justice system, community transitional centers and VA hospitals.

== Yoga practice and training ==
Huggins began practicing yoga in 2003 to counteract chronic back pain. In 2010 he became a registered yoga teacher with a 200-Hour Level certification from Power Yoga Works recognized by Yoga Alliance. Later that year he trained with Street Yoga to teach yoga and mindfulness to at-risk youth and vulnerable populations. He has since trained at the Kripalu Yoga Center, Omega Institute for Holistic Studies, the Prison Yoga Project, Power Yoga Works, and other organizations to gain additional skills as a trauma informed teacher, including for incarcerated populations, veterans, and individuals in substance abuse recovery.

== Career ==
Huggins studied Accounting at Villanova University and received an MBA from the Wharton School at the University of Pennsylvania. He has worked as a Senior Auditor at Arthur Andersen and Co., Manager of Treasury Operations for Kenner Parker Toys, Vice President of Administration for Town & County Corp., CFO/COO for Spectra Science, President and COO for Synthes, Inc., CEO for Scient"x, and most recently as a Consultant for MDH Advisors.

== Incarceration ==
In July 2009, the U.S. Department of Justice charged Synthes and a subsidiary with various offenses relating to a bone cement regulated by the federal government as a medical device. The government also charged four company executives, including Michael Huggins, with a strict liability misdemeanor offense under the Responsible Corporate Officer doctrine which holds executives responsible for activities that happened under their watch regardless of their knowledge of such activity. After pleading guilty to the strict liability misdemeanor charge, Huggins was sentenced in November 2011 to a nine-month prison term, a $100,000 fine, and three months of supervised release following his release from custody.

== Transformation Yoga Project ==
In 2010, Huggins began working with community organizations to provide yoga to at-risk youth, and as after-school programming for young people. During his first weeks in prison Huggins began teaching yoga and guided meditation to his fellow inmates. The popularity of his teaching spurred him to train fellow inmates as teachers also.

After his release from prison, Huggins attended a Prison Yoga Project training course and soon after began returning to prisons as a volunteer yoga instructor. Huggins found that yoga could be a therapy and build emotional tools against the traumas of living in prison as well as the traumas that came before incarceration, such as homelessness, drug abuse, and domestic violence.

In 2013, Huggins founded Transformation Yoga Project as a non-profit organization with a mission to train and provide teachers with yoga and mindfulness techniques that specifically support people with traumatic or addictive backgrounds in an effort to heal, build emotional stability, and reduce the stresses of imprisoned, rehabilitative, post-traumatic, or transitional living circumstances. Transformation Yoga Project encourages the yoga teachers it trains to embrace seva, the religious concept of serving selflessly. The goals of Transformation Yoga Project include curbing recidivism rates by enabling inmates to heal, develop greater maturity, and create positive growth for themselves. Many within prison administrations embrace yoga and mindfulness programs because of the benefits to the inmate populations during and after incarceration.

Transformation Yoga Project runs programs in numerous facilities including at the State Correctional Institute at Phoenix, State Correctional Institute at Graterford, the Philadelphia Prison System"s Cambria Community Center, the Montgomery County Youth Detention Center, the Montgomery County Youth Shelter, the Delaware County Juvenile Detention Center, the Federal Detention Center in Philadelphia, the Kirkbride Center for recovery, Gaudenzia house, the Divine Light Recovery House, the ODDAT Synergy House, and at the Veterans Hospital in Coatesville, Pennsylvania.

== Other ==
Huggins works with several non-profit organizations in a variety of capacities, including sharing yoga with at-risk and traumatized populations throughout the country. He has partnered with Prison Yoga Project to train yoga teachers. He sits on the Board of Directors of Liberation Prison Yoga, a non-profit organization founded by Anneke Lucas, to prepare yoga teachers with trauma-conscious methods for incarcerated people. He has also volunteered with the United Way of Chester County and Open Hearth where he taught career development workshops for the underprivileged.
