= Liam Paninski =

American computational neuroscientist (born 1978)

- Born: 1978 (age 47–48)
- Education: Brown University; New York University
- Awards: Sloan Research Fellowship
- Scientific career
- Workplaces: Columbia University
- Thesis: Some rigorous results on the neural coding problem
- Doctoral advisor: Eero Simoncelli
- Other academic advisors: John Donoghue

Liam Paninski (born 1978) is an American computational neuroscientist who specializes in neural data science. He is a professor in the Departments of Statistics and Neuroscience at Columbia University, where he co-directs the Grossman Center for the Statistics of Mind. Paninski's research focuses on using statistics to decipher electrical signals from the brain.

== Education ==
Paninski attended Brown University, where he received a Bachelor of Science degree in neuroscience in 1999. At Brown, Paninski was introduced to neuroscience research in the lab of John Donoghue. He was also influenced by applied mathematicians on faculty including Stuart Geman and David Mumford. Paninski completed his Ph.D. in neural science at New York University's Center for Neural Science in 2003 under the direction of Eero Simoncelli.

== Career ==
Paninski began teaching at Columbia in 2005.

In 2006 Paninski was named in MIT Technology Review's list of Innovators Under 35. He received a Sloan Research Fellowship in 2007.
