= Wyss Foundation =

Nonprofit organization in Washington D.C., United States

- Wyss Foundation logo
- Formation: 1998; 28 years ago
- Founder: Hansjörg Wyss
- Type: Private foundation
- Tax ID no.: 25-1823874
- Legal status: 501(c)(3)
- Location: Washington, D.C.
- President: Molly McUsic
- Affiliations: Berger Action Fund
- Endowment: $1.71 billion (2023)
- Website: wyssfoundation.org

The Wyss Foundation is a private non-profit foundation based in Washington, D.C., United States. It was founded by Swiss billionaire Hansjörg Wyss in 1998. The Wyss Foundation funds conservation efforts as well as progressive causes through Arabella Advisors and its related entities. The Wyss Foundation has an associated 501(c)(4) advocacy group called the Berger Action Fund, established in 2007. In 2018, the foundation launched the Wyss Campaign for Nature, with the aim of helping to conserve 30 per cent of the Earth's area in a natural state by the year 2030.

== Overview ==
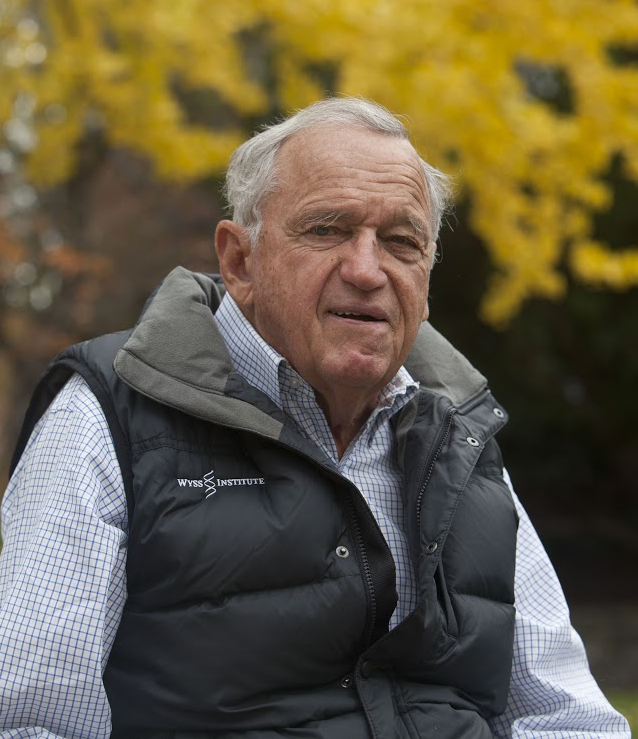
Hansjörg Wyss, who founded the Wyss Foundation in 1998

The Wyss Foundation, based in Washington, D.C., was established by Swiss billionaire Hansjörg Wyss in 1998.

The organization has offices in Washington, D.C., and Durango, Colorado. Molly McUsic is the president of the foundation. The organization has donated to the conservation of public lands in the western United States, as well as in North America more broadly, South America, Australia, Europe, and Africa.

In 2011, the foundation received a $187 million donation and in 2012 another $1.2 billion equivalent to $2 in 2025 was donated. Between $100 and $200 million was donated each year of 2013 and 2014. Since then, the foundation has sold down its balance sheet in order to fund its cash flow. In 2024 the foundation made $236 million in charitable disbursements and $783,000 in staff compensation.

As of 2018, Hansjörg Wyss and the Wyss Foundation had donated more than $450 million toward public land conservation.

As of 2023, the Wyss Foundation had an endowment of $1.71 billion.

== Conservation funding ==
Between 2006 and 2010, Wyss contributed $2.5 million to retire oil and gas leases that covered 110,000 acres of public land around the Rocky Mountain Front. In 2008, the foundation donated $12.5 million to The Nature Conservancy, and during 2009–2010, an additional $35 million in support of The Nature Conservancy's "Montana Legacy Project" to preserve 310,000 acres of timberland.

During the late 2000s, the organization provided a $7 million bridge loan to the Western Rivers Conservancy. In 2013, that resulted in the establishment of Oregon's Cottonwood Canyon State Park. During 2011–2013 the organization donated approximately $4.5 million to the Conservation Lands Foundation, where Hansjörg Wyss served as a founding board member.

In 2012, the foundation contributed $4.5 million to The Trust for Public Land campaign to retire oil and natural gas leases covering 58,000 acres of the Wyoming Range. The foundation donated approximately $19 million in 2013, primarily funding conservation groups and non-governmental organizations working on land protection projects. Grant recipients included the Theodore Roosevelt Conservation Partnership and Trout Unlimited. The foundation also provided funds to help remove the Veazie Dam along Penobscot River in Maine. Wyss and other funders provided interim financing to fund The Nature Conservancy's "Great Western Checkerboards" project that intends to conserve more than 100,000 acres of land around Gold Creek and the Blackfoot River, both in Montana, as well as in the Cascade Range in Washington state.

In the mid-2010s, the organization donated $10 million to restore ocean fisheries in Canada and Peru, and $6 million to reduce illegal wildlife trafficking in East Africa. In 2015, the foundation supported projects to conserve lands along the California coast and the John Day River in Oregon. Wyss also committed $1 million to retire oil and gas leases around the Flathead River, and $6 million to anti-poaching and conservation efforts in African Parks.

In 2016, as the result of a $3.15 million contribution from the Wyss Foundation, the Wilderness Land Trust confirmed the purchase of lands adjacent to the Sabinoso Wilderness in New Mexico. The foundation donated more than 16,000 acres of alpine tundra and forest in the Făgăraș Mountains of Romania to Fundatia Conservation Carpathia. That gift has been valued at approximately $16 million. The organization also supported efforts by the Forest Society of Maine, the Appalachian Mountain Club, and the Open Space Institute to preserve 4,358 acres of land around Silver Lake and the Pleasant River in Piscataquis County, Maine.

The Wyss Foundation partially funded the 2016 relocation of approximately 500 elephants from the Malawi Liwonde National Park and Majete Wildlife Reserve to Nkhotakota Wildlife Reserve by African Parks. In the same year, the foundation contributed to Global Fishing Watch.

Wyss helped protect the boreal forest in Canada, and committed $65 million in 2017 to support work of African Parks in Malawi and Rwanda, and to protect the Pendjari National Park in Benin. Funds to African Parks also supported management of Akagera National Park, Liwonde National Park, Majete Wildlife Reserve, and Nkhotakota Wildlife Reserve, among other protected areas. The foundation also has supported projects in Argentina and Mexico, as well as contributing funds in 2017 to protect the headwaters of the Amazon River.

In mid-2018, the organization helped The Trust for Public Land retire federal oil and natural gas leases covering more than 24,000 acres (9,700 ha) near Grand Teton National Park in Wyoming. In the same year, they partially funded a partnership agreement to manage and develop the Maputo Special Reserve and the Ponta do Ouro Partial Marine Reserve in Mozambique by Peace Parks Foundation.

In 2019, Wyss contributed $131 million via the foundation to the Wyss Institute for Biologically Inspired Engineering at Harvard University.

=== Wyss Campaign for Nature ===
In 2018, the Wyss Foundation launched the Wyss Campaign for Nature, pledging that it would donate $1 billion to the project. The campaign is sometimes referred to as "30x30" because it has the goal of protecting 30% of the world's surface by 2030. The campaign is backed by the National Geographic Society, among others.

The 30x30 plan has been criticized by some indigenous rights activists for potentially dispossessing human inhabitants from historically occupied land. Some tribal organizations and leaders have endorsed the initiative.

In 2019–2020, the Wyss Campaign for Nature helped to fund the purchase of two-thirds of Nilpena Station, a large cattle station in the Flinders Ranges area of South Australia. The acquisition of this land by the Government of South Australia, which includes significant Ediacaran beds, ensured that protection of the site would continue. The property became part what became Nilpena Ediacara National Park in 2021, since 2016 under consideration for classification as a World Heritage Site.

== Environmental journalism, education, and art funding ==
The Wyss Foundation has supported environmental journalism, children's education, and health initiatives. The organization has supported the Center for Budget and Policy Priorities, the Constitutional Accountability Center, and Health Leads. During the mid-2010s, the foundation contributed $385,000 to help the Society of Environmental Journalists create new environmental journalism positions dedicated to High Country News and the Los Angeles Times. The organization contributed to the Georgetown University Center for Children and Families annually from 2014 to 2017.

The foundation has also contributed to the Beyeler Foundation, an art museum in Riehen, Switzerland, and pledged funds for an extension of the museum planned for 2016. In 2018, Science published the Global Fishing Watch study of global fishing operations, a five-year study that was partially funded by Wyss.

== Political advocacy ==
The organisation funds Democratic Party political causes through Arabella Advisors and its related entities.

=== Berger Action Fund ===
The Wyss Foundation has an associated 501(c)(4) advocacy group called the Berger Action Fund, founded in 2007. The Berger Action Fund shares facilities and staff with the Wyss Foundation. Because of the way it is registered under the U.S. tax code, the Berger Action Fund is allowed to spend money supporting and opposing political candidates. Wyss's political giving has come under scrutiny since foreign nationals without permanent residency are prohibited from donating directly to federal political candidates or political action committees.

=== The Hub Project ===
In 2015, the Wyss Foundation funded the establishment of The Hub Project. According to a 2021 article in The New York Times, the group was created partly to shape media coverage to help Democratic causes, and its 2015 business plan said it would work behind the scenes to "dramatically shift the public debate and policy positions of core decision makers." The Hub Project is part of a network of funds managed by Arabella Advisors that The New York Times characterized as a major channel for "dark money" spending on the political left. The Hub Project is housed within the Arabella-sponsored groups, the New Venture Fund, and the Sixteen Thirty Fund. Between 2007 and 2020, the Wyss Foundation donated approximately $56.5 million to these groups.

=== Other political advocacy ===
The Wyss Foundation has also donated to States Newsroom, a nonprofit media group. Media watchdog NewsGuard reported that the States Newsroom journalism had been "bought by people with a political agenda".

In March 2021, The New York Times reported that Hansjörg Wyss had "quietly created a sophisticated political operation to advance progressive policy initiatives and the Democrats who support them."
