= Judy Liu =

Judy Shih-Hwa Liu
- Education: Yale University; Albert Einstein College of Medicine; Beth Israel Deaconess Medical Center
- Scientific career
- Fields: Neuroscience
- Workplaces: Children’s National Medical Center; Brown University; University of Texas Southwestern Medical Center
- Thesis: Regulation of nitric oxide synthase II in primary human fetal astrocytes: A critical role for interleukin-1 and extracellular ATP (2000)
- Doctoral advisor: Celia Brosnan; Sunhee Lee
- Website: Liu Lab

Judy Shih-Hwa Liu is the Miller Family Distinguished University Chair in Neurological Disease at the University of Texas Southwestern Medical Center. She works on the cortical malformations that cause epilepsy.

== Education and early career ==
Liu earned a Bachelor of Science at Yale University. She moved to New York for her graduate studies, and completed a PhD and MD at Albert Einstein College of Medicine. After her MD, she completed a medical internship in internal medicine at Beth Israel Deaconess Medical Center. She was appointed as a neurological resident at Beth Israel Deaconess Medical Center in 2001. She began her research group at Children’s National Medical Center, moving to Brown University in 2017 to become the Sidney A. Fox and Dorothea Doctors Fox Professor of Ophthalmology and Neuroscience, and subsequently to University of Texas Southwestern Medical Center in 2025.

== Research ==
Liu studies epilepsy arising from focal cortical dysplasia. She investigates surgically removed tissues and found that they are influenced by circadian rhythm. The protein CLOCK (Circadian Locomotor Output Cycles Kaput) is a transcription factor that is important in regulating circadian rhythm in the suprachiasmatic nucleus. Liu analyzed the transcriptome of surgically removed tissues and found differences in the RNA of CLOCK. She created mouse models, one with neurons defunct in CLOCK and the other with neurons lacking inhibitory cells. The mice without limited CLOCK suffered from epilepsy similar to humans. In 2017, she was awarded a Citizens United for Research in Epilepsy award to study the molecular CLOCK and sleep-associated seizures. She contributed to the 2012 book Jasper's Basic Mechanisms of the Epilepsies.

She was awarded the Brain & Behavior Research Foundation NASRAD Young Investigator Award and a Whitehall Foundation grant to study the cell biology that underlies the development of axons. In 2013, she was awarded a grant to study the molecular mechanisms that prevent the initiation of seizures. The grant aims to identify changes in mRNA and microRNA in people who suffer from cortical dysplasia and tuberous sclerosis.
