= Health Leads =

Non-profit organization in the US

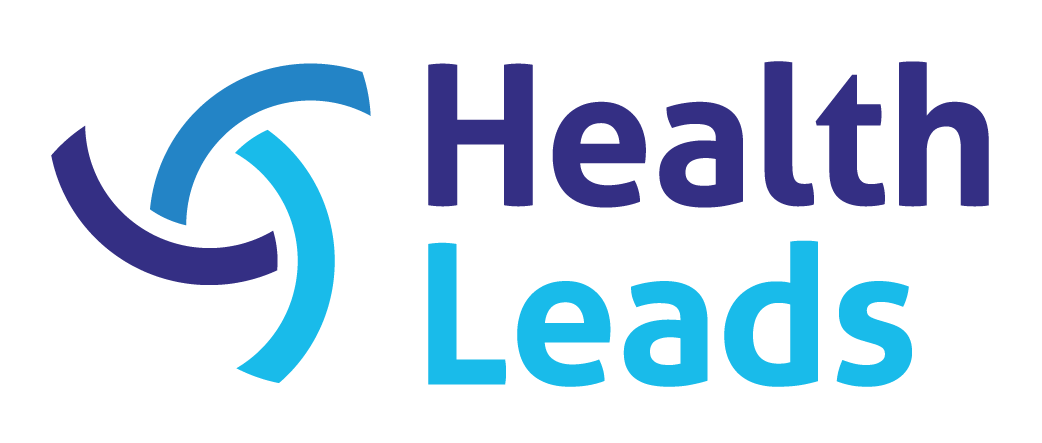
- Founded: 1996
- Founder: Rebecca Onie; Barry Zuckerman
- Headquarters: Boston
- Key people: Alexandra (Alex) Quinn, Chief Executive Officer; Damon Francis MD, Chief Clinical Officer
- Revenue: 8,320,914 United States dollar (2016)
- Total assets: 12,805,566 United States dollar (2022)
- Website: healthleadsusa.org

Health Leads is a non-profit organization based in Boston with a vision of "health, dignity, and well-being for every person, in every community." The organization runs community-based programs and learning initiatives across the U.S. that focus on addressing social, racial, and economic factors impacting health.

== History and achievements ==
In 2010, Project HEALTH became Health Leads and began using its expertise in social needs screening, referral and navigation to create tools, resources, and educational offerings.

On July 28, 2011, the New York Times ran a commentary about Health Leads, written by David Bornstein (author), which referred to Health Leads as "one of the most impressive organizations in the country" at addressing the conditions that cause sickness.

In 2018, in partnership with NYC Health and Hospitals, Health Leads launched a WIC connection initiative deploying community health workers.

In response to the COVID-19 pandemic, Health Leads launched its "Respond & Rebuild" effort in March 2020 with initiatives designed to engage the communities hardest hit by COVID-19.

=== Funding ===
Health Leads is currently supported by both foundations and individual donors.

In March 2011, The Skoll Foundation awarded Health Leads a $1.2 million, three-year grant in connection with its social entrepreneurship award to Rebecca Onie.

In June 2011, Health Leads completed a capital campaign to raise $11.1 million for a four-year strategic growth plan.

In 2014, Robert Wood Johnson Foundation gave Health Leads a $16 million grant to focus on scaling impact.

Other donors include New Profit, a venture philanthropy fund, and The Physicians Foundation.

== Evaluations and media coverage ==
=== Media Coverage and Awards ===
In an April 2013 article in the Journal of the American Medical Association, Health Leads was provided as an example of an "outside the box" multidisciplinary primary care intervention, along with programs like Reach Out and Read and the Medical-Legal Partnership. The article made recommendations for successful approaches to addressing social determinants of health.

In April 2013, the Academic Pediatric Association’s Task Force on Childhood Poverty, formed to address the effect of childhood poverty on health, released a brief highlighting specific programs, including Health Leads, as "evidence-based primary care programs that help children in poor families."

The Schwab Foundation for Social Entrepreneurship named Onie one of twenty-four international Social Entrepreneurs of the Year 2013. The award recognizes leadership and innovation, as well as potential for global impact.

The Center for Public Leadership at the Harvard Kennedy School named Rebecca Onie as the 2012 recipient of the Gleitsman Citizen Activist Award, bestowed biennially to leaders "who have struggled to correct social injustice in the United States."

In December 2012, Health Leads was named to the S&I 100, an index launched by the Social Impact Exchange highlighting America’s top-performing non-profit organizations.

In October 2012, the Robert Wood Johnson Foundation selected Rebecca Onie as one of ten recipients, 40 years of age and younger, of the Young Leader Award: Recognizing Leadership for a Healthier America.

In 2012, Rebecca Onie co-authored "Realigning Health with Care: Lessons in Delivering More with Less", highlighting the need for America to expand its scope of healthcare. The article appeared in the Stanford Social Innovation Review.

In April 2012, Rebecca Onie delivered a TEDMED talk, "Can We Rewrite the DNA of the Healthcare System?" where she asked, "If we know what we need to do to have a healthcare system, rather than a sickcare system - why don't we do it?"

In December 2011, Harris Interactive, on behalf of the Robert Wood Johnson Foundation, found that nine in ten physicians serving patients in low-income communities believe patients' social needs are as important to address as their medical conditions and offered Health Leads as a promising model for bridging the gap.

On July 28, 2011, The New York Times ran a commentary about Health Leads, written by David Bornstein, which referred to Health Leads as "one of the most impressive organizations in the country" at addressing the conditions that make people sick.

The Skoll Foundation awarded Rebecca Onie one of its four 2011 Skoll Awards for Entrepreneurship for Health Leads’ role in "scalable, proven solutions" to the "toughest of problems". The awards go to social entrepreneurs "around the world in the areas of tolerance and human rights, health, environmental sustainability, peace and security and economic and social equity."

Onie was named to Oprah Winfrey's 2010 O Power List of women who are "changing the world for the better." According to O: The Oprah Magazine, Onie and Health Leads "blew us away" by understanding "the power of the big picture."

In 2009, Onie received a MacArthur Fellows Program from the John D. and Catherine T. MacArthur Foundation for her work with Health Leads. Onie, one of 24 recipients of the award, was honored for Health Leads’ work "providing health care professionals with effective tools for alleviating the socioeconomic barriers that limit access to health care for low-income families, thereby expanding the scope of what health care truly entails."

At the 2009 Time 100 Most Influential People Gala, First Lady Michelle Obama called Project HEALTH (now Health Leads) "exactly the kind of social innovation and entrepreneurship we should be encouraging all across this country."
