= Campus Biotech =

Swiss research institution

Coordinates: 46.2220933°N 6.1482650°E

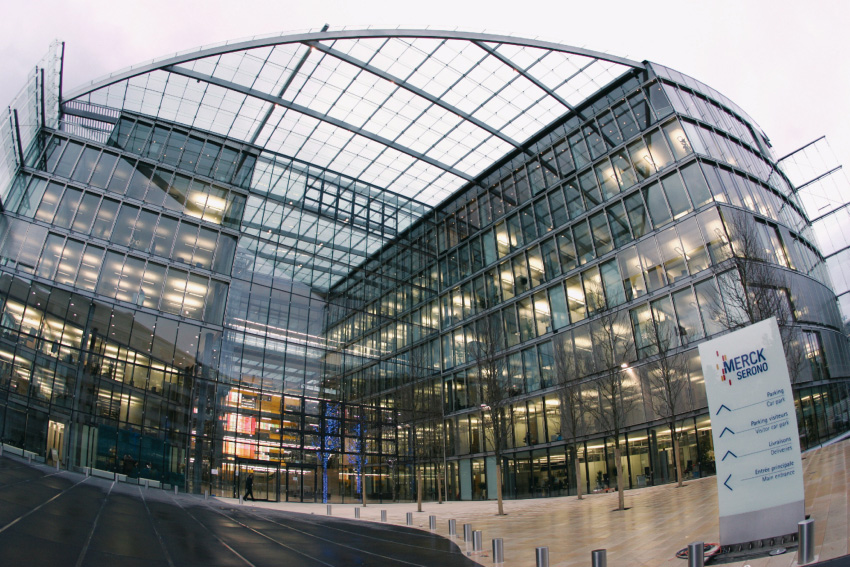
- Established: 2013
- Field of research: Biology and biotechnology
- Location: Geneva, Switzerland
- Website: www.campusbiotech.ch

The Campus Biotech is a Swiss institution hosting research institutes and biotechnology companies. The Campus Biotech is located in the former Merck Serono building, in Geneva (Switzerland).

The Campus Biotech is a part of the Swiss Innovation Park.

== History ==
End of June 2013, Merck Serono left its headquarters in Geneva and the building was bought by Ernesto Bertarelli and Hansjörg Wyss (for more than 300 million Swiss francs) to create the Campus Biotech.

== Structure ==
- EPFL-UNIGE Biomedical Center (14000 m^{2})
  - Center for Neuroprosthetics (EPFL)
- Human Brain Project and Blue Brain Project (EPFL) (5000 m^{2})
- Wyss Center for Bio and Neuroengineering (8000 m^{2})
- Foundation for Innovative New Diagnostics (FIND)
- Biotech Innovation Square (12000 m^{2})
- Health 2030 Genome Center

== See also ==
- Lausanne campus
