= Leigh Hochberg =

American neurologist, neuroscientist, and neuroengineer

Leigh R. Hochberg
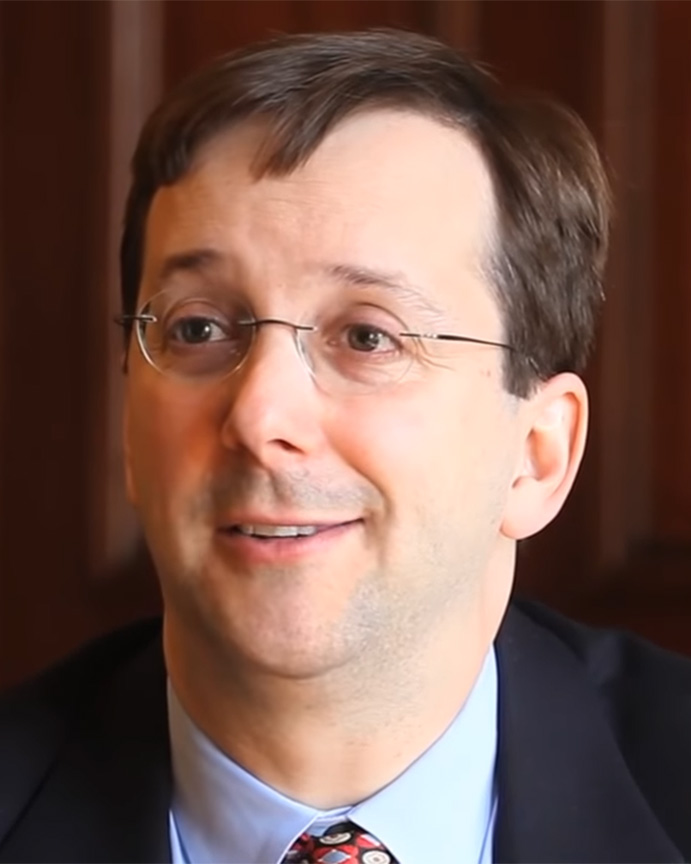
- Born: New York, NY
- Education: Brown University; Emory University
- Scientific career
- Workplaces: Brown University School of Engineering

Leigh Robert Hochberg is an American neurologist, neuroscientist, and neuroengineer. He is the Director of the Center for Neurotechnology and Neurorecovery at Massachusetts General Hospital and the L. Herbert Ballou University Professor of Engineering at Brown University. He is also affiliated with the VA RR&D Center for Neurorestoration and Neurotechnology. Hochberg is known with his involvement in BrainGate and brain-computer interface research more broadly. In 2021, he led a clinical trial demonstrating the first high-bandwidth wireless human brain-computer interface.

Hochberg earned his Bachelor of Science in neuroscience from Brown University in 1990. He completed his MD and Ph.D. at Emory University in 1999.

== Awards and fellowships ==
- Society for Neuroscience, Member
- American Academy of Neurology, Fellow
- American Neurological Association, Fellow
