= Arto Nurmikko =

Finnish physics professor

Arto V. Nurmikko
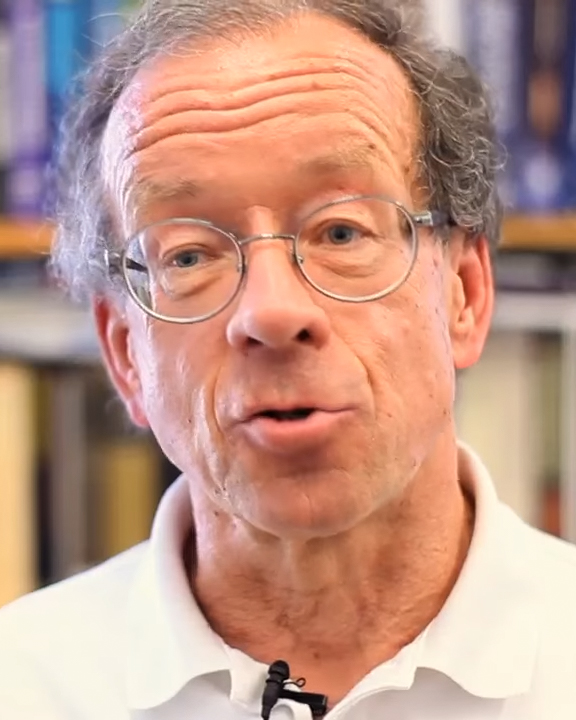
- Born: Finland
- Education: University of California, Berkeley (Ph.D.)
- Known for: Wireless neural interfaces, Semiconductor lasers
- Awards: B.R.A.I.N Prize (2013)
- Scientific career
- Fields: Physics, Neuroengineering
- Workplaces: Brown University, Wyss Center for Bio and Neuroengineering
- Website: nurmikko.engin.brown.edu

Arto V. Nurmikko, a native of Finland, is a L. Herbert Ballou University Professor of Engineering and Physics at Brown University. He received his degrees from University of California, Berkeley, with postdoctoral stays at MIT and Hebrew University. Professor Nurmikko conducts research in neuroengineering, brain sciences, nanophotonics and microelectronics, especially for the translation of device research to new technologies in biomedical, life science, and photonics applications.

His current interests include development of implantable wireless neural interfaces, nanoscale neural circuit sensors, compact red/green/blue/UV semiconductor lasers, and high resolution acoustic microscopy. He has published in several fields (about 400 articles), led many multi-institutional research teams, advised federal funding agencies, and lectured worldwide.

Professor Nurmikko is a Fellow of the American Physical Society, Fellow of the Institute of Electrical and Electronics Engineers, and Fellow of the Optical Society of America. He has been the recipient of a Guggenheim Fellowship, and elected to the American Academy of Arts and Sciences. He is also a member of the Finnish Academy of Science and Letters.
