= Synthes =

Former Swiss medical device manufacturer

Synthes Holding AG
- Formerly: Synthes-Stratec
- Type: Subsidiary
- Traded as: SIX: SYST
- Industry: Health care
- Founded: 1999; 27 years ago
- Headquarters: Solothurn, Switzerland (corporate), West Chester, Pennsylvania, United States (operational)
- Key people: Michel Orsinger (president and CEO)
- Products: Physical trauma, craniofacial, mandible and chest implants, medical power tools, capital equipments
- Revenue: US $3.687 billion (2010)
- Operating income: US $1.283 billion (2010)
- Net income: US $907.7 million (2010)
- Total assets: US $7.924 billion (end 2010)
- Number of employees: 11,430 (end 2010)
- Parent: Johnson & Johnson
- Subsidiaries: stratec-synthes.com
- Website: synthes.com

Synthes Holding AG (formerly Synthes-Stratec) is a multinational medical device manufacturer based in Solothurn, Switzerland and West Chester, Pennsylvania, United States. It is the world's largest maker of implants to mend bone fractures, and also produces surgical power tools and advanced biomaterials.

In June 2012 Synthes was sold by its chairman, former CEO and largest shareholder Hansjörg Wyss to Johnson & Johnson for $20.2 billion. Stratec continues to oversee owned patents and select manufacturing. The company is part of Johnson & Johnson MedTech business segment.

== History ==
Synthes was originally established in 1960 as a trademark of the Swiss non-profit institute Arbeitsgemeinschaft für Osteosynthesefragen (English: Association for the Study of Internal Fixation, AO/ASIF),

The Synthes trademark was applied to internal fixation implants produced under license by its industrial partners, Straumann Group and Mathys Medizinaltechnik. In 1975, the company Synthes (internal fixation implants) was spun off from AO/ASIF and Straumann who focused thereafter on tooth implants. In the same year, Synthes USA, a firm founded by Harvard graduate Hansjörg Wyss, became the third company to form an alliance with AO/ASIF. Throughout the decade, Straumann and Mathys expanded their coverage around the rest of the world. Because of its affiliation with AO/ASIF, which is in involved in mandatory training for many European orthopedic surgeons, healthcare practitioners are more likely to have brand loyalty to Synthes products.

In 1990 Straumann spun off its implant business into a separate privately owned company, Stratec Medical. Stratec partially listed its shares on the SWX Swiss Exchange through an initial public offering six years later, while Synthes USA and Mathys remained in private hands.

Three years later, however, Stratec and Synthes USA merged to form a new publicly traded company named Synthes-Stratec. After the merger Hansjörg Wyss became, and remained (until the sale to Johnson & Johnson) the majority shareholder of the enlarged company.

The third of the original AO/ASIF partner companies, Mathys, sold its osteosynthesis department to Synthes-Stratec in 2004, although the firm's German division was divested to satisfy competition authorities. The company subsequently dropped the "-Stratec" suffix to become simply Synthes. The company's shares were added to the benchmark Swiss Market Index for the first time in September 2004.

In 2006 the company acquired the rights to the Synthes brand name and most of the related intellectual property, including patents, from the AO/ASIF foundation for around CHF1 billion. AO also acquired a stake in Synthes. The two organisations continue to collaborate on relevant issues.

In October 2010, Synthes and its subsidiary Norian both pleaded guilty to crimes relating to illegally implanting bone cement without FDA approval. Norian will admit to a felony charge of conspiracy to impede FDA functions and pay a $23 million fine. Synthes will then divest Norian.

In November 2010, Synthes acquired USA based privately owned surgical tools maker The Anspach Effort, Inc; the purchase price was not disclosed.

On April 27, 2011, Synthes and Johnson and Johnson DePuy agreed to a merger deal. The merger created the world's largest orthopedic corporation.

On June 13, 2012 Johnson & Johnson announced the acquisition of Synthes for $19.7 billion. The merger led to jobs losses for some subsidiary groups. In Italy, the headquarters were moved from Milan to Rome.

== Products ==
The company's product offering spans six divisions, of which four produce implants and related instruments for the treatment of physical trauma, spinal injuries and CMF (craniomaxillofacial) trauma, as well as for osteotomy in animals such as horses and dogs. Synthes' other business segments are the production of surgical power tools and biomaterials used to fill bone defects.

== Norian XR scandal ==
In 2009 the U.S. attorney in Philadelphia accused the company of illegally promoting a bone void filler for unapproved uses, running unauthorized clinical trials, and failing to properly report deaths and adverse events related to the product. Between 2002 and 2004, Synthes attempted to promote new uses for a product called Norian XR, a calcium phosphate bone void filler mixed with barium sulfate. The Food and Drug Administration explicitly told Synthes not to promote Norian for certain spine surgeries, but the company pushed forward anyway. At least five patients who had Norian injected into their spines died on the operating-room table.

In 2009 Synthes announced a settlement with the state of New Jersey over concerns that clinical investigators did not disclose their financial interests. In November 2009 Synthes pleaded guilty to allegations of shipping “adulterated and misbranded” products as part of unlawful clinical trials.

The indictment charges Synthes Inc. with a total of 52 felony counts: conspiracy to impair and impede the lawful functions of the FDA and to commit crimes against the US; 7 counts of making false statements in connection with an FDA inspection; and 44 counts of shipping adulterated and misbranded Norian XR in interstate commerce with intent to defraud.

The parent company, Synthes, was charged with 44 misdemeanor counts of shipping adulterated and misbranded Norian XR in interstate commerce, and the four executives, Michael D. Huggins, Thomas B. Higgins, Richard E. Bohner and John J. Walsh, were each charged with one strict liability misdemeanor offense. Synthes Inc. acquired N Spine Inc. in 2007.

From May 2002 until fall 2004 Norian conspired with others, including Synthes and the four named executives, to conduct unauthorized clinical trials of Synthes's medical devices, Norian XR and Norian SRS, in surgeries to treat vertebral compression fractures of the spine (VCFs), a painful condition commonly suffered by elderly individuals.

These surgeries were allegedly performed despite a warning on the FDA-cleared label for Norian XR against this use, and in the face of serious medical concerns about the safety of the devices when used in the spine.

According to the indictment, before the marketing program began, pilot studies showed the company that the bone cement reacted chemically with human blood in a test tube to cause blood clots. The research also showed, in a pig, that leakage of small amounts of Norian XR from the spine into the blood caused clots, which become lodged in the lungs. Notwithstanding this knowledge, the company allegedly proceeded to market the product for VCFs without putting it through FDA-required testing. The company, it is alleged, did not stop marketing the product until after a third patient had died on the operating table.

In late 2011, all four executives received prison sentences ranging from five to nine months.
