= William H. Warren =

American psychologist

William H. Warren Jr. is an American psychologist who is currently the Chancellor's Professor at Brown University, focusing on perception and action, visual control of locomotion, and spatial navigation.
