= Wayne Bowen =

American pharmacologist and biologist

Wayne Bowen is an American pharmacologist, biologist, and neuroscientist who is Professor Emeritus of Neuroscience, and Adjunct Professor of Neuroscience at Brown University.

Bowen earned his B.S. in chemistry from Morgan State College and completed a Ph.D. in biochemistry and neurobiology at Cornell University in 1981.

He is a nationally recognized leader in research on sigma receptors and is generally credited with the discovery and initial characterization of the sigma-2 receptor.
