= Edward Hawrot =

American medical scientist

Edward Hawrot is an American medical scientist, and currently the Alva O. Way University Professor of Medical Science at Brown University. He was previously the Upjohn Professor from 2001 to 2008.

He earned a PHD at Harvard University.
