= Constitutional Accountability Center =

U.S. non-profit organization

- Formation: Tax-exempt since February 1998; 28 years ago
- Type: 501(c)(3)
- Tax ID no.: EIN 522063854
- Headquarters: Washington, D.C.
- Revenue: 2,963,035 USD (2024)
- Expenses: 3,269,098 USD (2024)
- Website: theusconstitution.org

The Constitutional Accountability Center (CAC) is a non-profit think tank located in Washington, D.C., that seeks to advance a progressive interpretation of the Constitution of the United States. The group has filed numerous lawsuits against President Donald Trump.

== History ==
CAC was launched on June 3, 2008. Its predecessor organization was the Community Rights Counsel. Both organizations were founded and led by Douglas Kendall. Advisors to CAC have included Akhil Amar, Jack Balkin, and Walter E. Dellinger III.

== Philosophy and methodology ==
CAC is a proponent of "New Textualism", a school of thought focused on the text, structure, and enactment history of the language of the Constitution. The organization makes legal arguments based in constitutional text and history, with particular emphasis on the Thirteenth, Fourteenth, and Fifteenth Amendments. CAC founder and president Douglas Kendall has stated his belief that a renewed focus on the Civil War Amendments can help to reveal the Constitution as a progressive document. A CAC publication about New Textualism states that "the Constitution provides concrete and progressive answers to many important questions."

CAC heads "Constitutional Progressives," a coalition anchored by the Center for American Progress and People for the American Way.

== Litigation ==
U.S. Supreme Court cases in which CAC has filed amici curiae briefs include:

- Citizens United v. FEC (campaign finance, 2010)
  - CAC filed a brief explaining that the text and history of the Constitution make clear that campaign expenditures by corporations can be subject to greater regulation than expenditures by individuals.
- Fisher v. University of Texas (affirmative action, 2013)
  - CAC filed a brief on behalf of law professors Bruce Ackerman, Vikram Amar, Jack Balkin, Burt Neuborne, James Ryan, and Adam Winkler defending the constitutionality of UT-Austin's admissions policy.
- Hollingsworth v. Perry (same-sex marriage, 2013)
  - CAC filed a joint brief with the Cato Institute demonstrating that the text and history of the Fourteenth Amendment guarantee equality under the law and equality of rights for all persons.
- Shelby County v. Holder (voting rights, 2013)
  - CAC filed a brief on behalf of law professors Jack Balkin, Guy-Uriel Charles, Luis Fuentes-Rohwer, and Adam Winkler demonstrating that the framers of the Thirteenth, Fourteenth, and Fifteenth Amendments gave Congress broad power to enact legislation like the Voting Rights Act to ensure the right to vote free from racial discrimination and infringement by the states.
- McCutcheon v. FEC (campaign finance, 2014)
  - CAC filed a brief on behalf of constitutional law scholar and Harvard law professor Lawrence Lessig urging the Court to uphold federal aggregate contribution limits.
- Burwell v. Hobby Lobby (corporate rights, 2014)
  - CAC urged the Court to reject the free exercise and RFRA claims of Hobby Lobby and Conestoga Wood and uphold the ACA's contraception coverage requirement as it applies to secular, for-profit corporations.

== Publications ==
CAC's Issue Briefs Series provides commentary and analysis on current constitutional and political issues, including, voting rights, campaign finance, citizenship, corporate rights, and federal power. CAC has also published Issue Briefs and released several reports on the success of the U.S. Chamber of Commerce and business interests before the Supreme Court under Chief Justice John Roberts.

== Donors ==
In 2018, the organization had about $4.3 million in revenue.

The Wyss Foundation is one of the organization's financial supporters.

== See also ==
- Legal affairs of Donald Trump (disambiguation)
