= Michael Paradiso =

American neuroscientist

Michael A. Paradiso is an American neuroscientist, currently the Sidney A. Fox and Dorothea Doctors Fox Professor and Founding Director of the Center for Vision Research at Brown University.
