= CACNA1B =

Protein-coding gene in humans

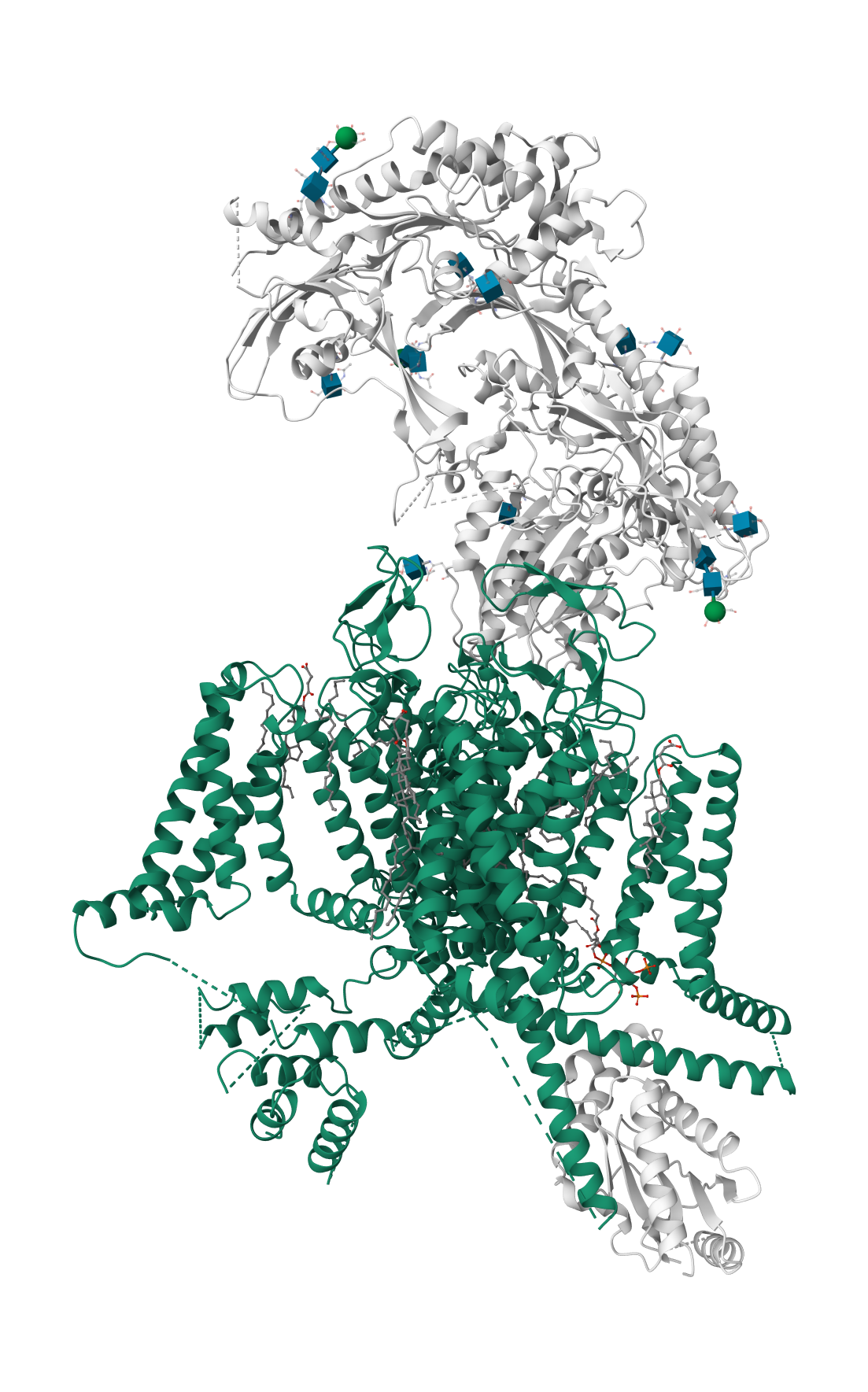

Identifiers
- Aliases: CACNA1B, BIII, CACNL1A5, CACNN, Cav2.2, DYT23, calcium voltage-gated channel subunit alpha1 B, NEDNEH
- External IDs: OMIM: 601012; MGI: 88296; GeneCards: CACNA1B
Available structures
PDB	Ortholog search: PDBe RCSB
PDB	List of PDB id codes 2LCM

Gene location (Human)
Chr.	Chromosome 9 (human)
Band	9q34.3	Start	137,877,782 bp
Band	9q34.3	End	138,124,624 bp

Gene location (Mouse)
Chr.	Chromosome 2 (mouse)
Band	2 A3|2 16.58 cM	Start	24,493,899 bp
Band	2 A3|2 16.58 cM	End	24,653,164 bp
RNA expression pattern
Bgee	Human / Mouse (ortholog); Top expressed in: middle temporal gyrus; Brodmann area 23; postcentral gyrus; endothelial cell; superior frontal gyrus; entorhinal cortex; right hemisphere of cerebellum; primary visual cortex; Brodmann area 46; cerebellar vermis / Top expressed in: supraoptic nucleus; ventromedial nucleus; dorsomedial hypothalamic nucleus; anterior amygdaloid area; trigeminal ganglion; gastrula; subiculum; arcuate nucleus; lumbar spinal ganglion; mammillary body; More reference expression data
BioGPS	n/a
Gene ontology
Molecular function	protein C-terminus binding; metal ion binding; nucleotide binding; calcium ion binding; voltage-gated calcium channel activity; high voltage-gated calcium channel activity; ion channel activity; ATP binding; voltage-gated ion channel activity; protein binding; calcium channel activity; amyloid-beta binding
Cellular component	integral component of membrane; presynapse; membrane; soma; dendrite; voltage-gated calcium channel complex; plasma membrane
Biological process	calcium ion transport; chemical synaptic transmission; transmembrane transport; membrane depolarization during action potential; locomotory behavior; regulation of ion transmembrane transport; regulation of blood pressure; regulation of calcium ion transport; ion transport; regulation of heart contraction; calcium ion transmembrane transport; response to pain; membrane depolarization; neurotransmitter secretion; calcium ion import; modulation of chemical synaptic transmission; response to amyloid-beta
Sources:Amigo / QuickGO
Orthologs
Databases	NCBI: entry; OMA: entry
Species	Human	Mouse
Entrez	774	12287
Ensembl	ENSG00000148408	ENSMUSG00000004113
UniProt	Q00975	O55017
RefSeq (mRNA)	NM_000718; NM_001243812	NM_001042528; NM_007579
RefSeq (protein)	NP_000709; NP_001230741	NP_001035993; NP_031605
Location (UCSC)	Chr 9: 137.88 – 138.12 Mb	Chr 2: 24.49 – 24.65 Mb
PubMed search
- Wikidata
View/Edit Human	View/Edit Mouse

The voltage-dependent N-type calcium channel subunit alpha-1B is a protein that in humans is encoded by the CACNA1B gene. The α1B protein, together with β and α2δ subunits forms an N-type calcium channel (Ca_{v}2.2 channel).
