= Christopher I. Moore =

Neuroscientist

- Education: Oberlin College, MIT
- Known for: Optogenetics
- Scientific career
- Fields: Neuroscience
- Workplaces: Brown University, MIT
- Doctoral advisor: Suzanne Corkin

Christopher I. Moore is a neuroscientist at Brown University.

== Early life and education ==
Moore studied philosophy and neuroscience at Oberlin College, where he received his A.B., and Massachusetts Institute of Technology, where he received his Ph.D.

== Research ==
Before working at Brown University, Moore was a member of MIT's McGovern Institute for Brain Research and an associate professor in the Department of Brain and Cognitive Sciences. At Brown University, he studies the neural mechanisms of perception, in particular the rapid dynamic changes in cortical activity that underlie touch perception. His research includes electrophysiological and optogenetic studies in rodents, particularly the whisker system, a widely studied model for understanding tactile perception. He also studies human touch perception using behavioral and imaging methods. One of his current interests is the neural basis of gamma waves, which have been linked to conscious perception and which are altered in disorders such as schizophrenia. Moore also studies blood flow within the brain. He is a proponent of the Hemo-Neural Hypothesis, which proposes that changes in cerebral blood flow not only reflect but also influence neural activity.
