= Reach Out and Read =

US literacy organization for children

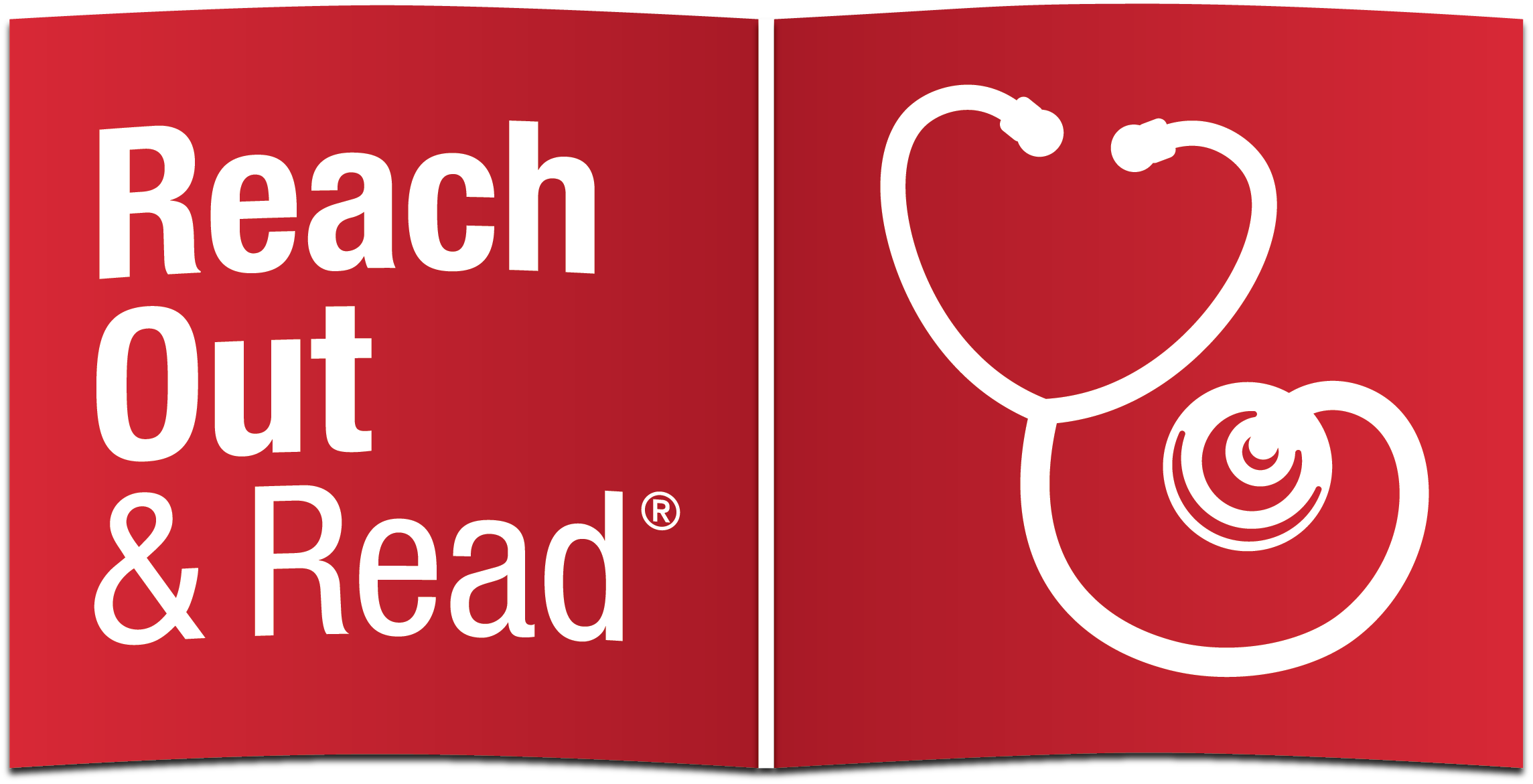
Reach Out and Read logo

Reach Out and Read, Inc. (ROR) is a US nonprofit organization that promotes reading.

Reach Out and Read is a national early literacy organization working directly with pediatric care providers to share the lifelong benefits that result from families reading aloud to their children every day. ROR programs integrate these experiences into pediatric care and provide the tools and encouragement families need to read aloud together.

== History ==
Reach Out and Read (ROR) was founded in 1989 at Boston Medical Center (then Boston City Hospital) by a group of pediatricians and educators including Barry Zuckerman, MD and his then Fellow in Development and Behavioral Pediatrics Robert Needlman, MD. His Fellow project was a retrospective study that showed that mothers whose children were given books at prior visits were six times more likely to read to their children compared to mothers who did not get a book. This data coupled with the enjoyment by children and parents led to dissemination which accelerated following the first major grant from the Casey Foundation facilitated by Betty King. By this time Robert Needlman had left Boston to go to Cleveland and Perri Klass replaced him. Zuckerman was able to get the attention of Hillary Clinton and Sen Ted Kennedy who became important supporters; they would come to health centers when they traveled; not limited to Boston and have a local event along with Zuckerman which always generated a lot of media attention. They also provided leadership in Congress helping to obtain Federal support for ( up to 10Min final year. There were several events at the White House Pediatricians around the country recognized the profound significance of ROR for school readiness and social-emotional achievement: growth was driven by committed pediatricians and funders who made reading aloud a "doctor-recommended" activity.

Over three decades, Reach Out and Read has expanded across the country and built its evidence base. Today, more than 6,400 clinical locations nationwide implement the evidence-based model, leveraging the existing health care system for a cost-effective delivery. Their team of 34,000 medical providers distributes 7.4 million new books to 4.8 million children annually.

== Program and methods ==
Reach Out and Read is a nonprofit organisation that promotes early literacy and social-emotional development between birth and age five, with a focus families from low-income background. The organization partners with podiatric medical professionals who encourage parents to read with their children and provide books and resources to support early learning.

Beginning at six months when children become developmentally ready, especially in the ability for joint attention, pediatric medical teams nationwide coach and model for parents at well-child visits until age 5 about the critical role that reading aloud and telling stories should play in their daily routine with their children. Children also receive a new, age, language and developmentally-appropriate book to bring home and build their home library.

Through special initiatives, Reach Out and Read adapts their intervention to serve special populations, creating a more powerful and individualized intervention. These special initiatives include the American Indian/Alaska Native Initiative, Leyendo Juntos Initiative (for Spanish-speaking families), Military Families Initiative, Early Math Initiative, and Developmental Disabilities Initiative.

Reach Out and Read's model of integrating literacy into routine pediatric care is designed to meet families where they are; while less than one-third of children in the United States are enrolled in a childcare setting, more than 90% receive a well-child check-up every year. With their access to pediatric providers, Reach Out and Read reaches children whose need is greatest, during the first three years of their lives.

Reach Out and Read has demonstrated that reading aloud with infants and toddlers connects to the most significant parts of a child's development. Shared reading provides children with a fertile learning environment—encouraging curiosity and imagination. It also promotes resilience and mitigates toxic stress. Reach Out and Read starts with early literacy, but naturally extends to social-emotional development, motivation, persistence, confidence, and more.

By making literacy promotion a standard part of pediatric care, Reach Out and Read leverages the child development expertise of pediatric medical teams to prepare children at risk for academic and life outcomes.

== Evidence base ==
The Reach Out and Read program has been the subject of more than a dozen independent studies, the largest body of scientific research for any psychosocial intervention in pediatrics, showing that children served by Reach Out and Read are read to more often, have more books in their home, and enter kindergarten with larger vocabularies, stronger language skills, and a greater affinity towards books and reading.

Endorsed by the American Academy of Pediatrics (AAP), in their 2014 policy statement, Literacy Promotion: An Essential Component of Primary Care Pediatric Practice, the AAP cited the body of research on Reach Out and Read in calling on pediatric care providers to promote literacy, beginning in infancy. According to the AAP, "Research, in summary, shows that in populations at risk, participation in the [Reach Out and Read] intervention is associated with markedly more positive attitudes toward reading aloud, more frequent reading aloud by parents, improved parent-child interactions, improvements in the home literacy environment, and significant increases in expressive and receptive language in early childhood." Through the policy statement, the AAP also recommends that literacy promotion be "an essential component of primary care pediatric practice." [vi]

Reach Out and Read is a recipient of New York Times columnist and two-time Pulitzer Prize-winner Nick Kristof's 2019 and 2024 Holiday Impact Prize. The organization was cited in Kristof and wife Sheryl WuDunn's books Tightrope: Americans Reaching for Hope (2020) and A Path Appears (2014). Krisof and WuDunn cite Reach Out and Read as, "an excellent example of a cost-effective, evidence-based program that helps kids in a crucial window of development."

Other awards include the 2013 American Hospital Association Award of Honor "to recognize an exemplary contribution to the health and well-being of the people through leadership on a major health policy or social initiative," the 2013 David M. Rubenstein Prize from the Library of Congress for its "groundbreaking advancement of literacy," and the 2014 Carle Angel Honor for its "tireless promotion of early literacy and school readiness."
