= Wyss Center for Bio and Neuroengineering =

Swiss research foundation

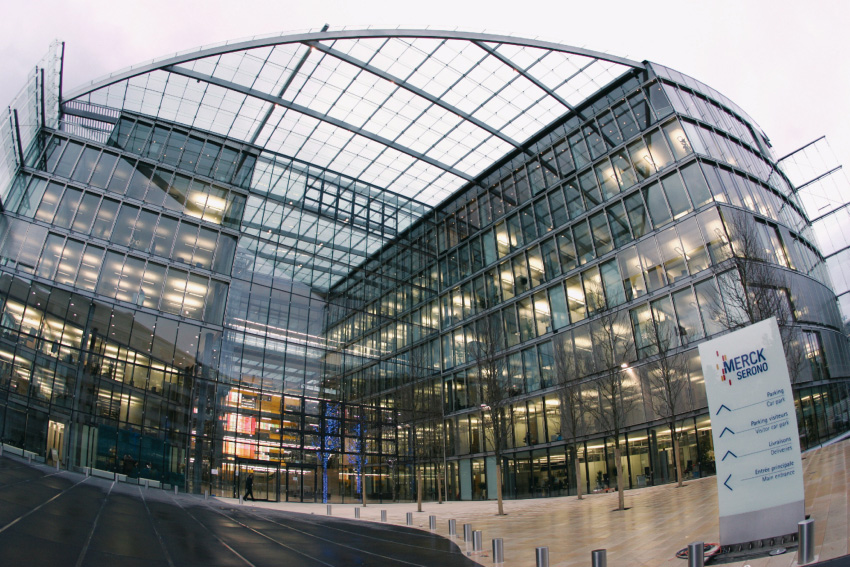
- Nickname: Wyss Geneva
- Established: 2014
- Field of research: Neurotechnology
- Director: Tracy Laabs
- Location: Chemin des Mines 9, 1202 Geneva, Geneva, Switzerland
- Website: wysscenter.ch

The Wyss Center for Bio and Neuroengineering is an independent, not-for-profit neuro venture builder with strong translational R&D roots, committed to transforming the treatment of neurological and mental health disorders.

By bridging the gap between scientific discovery and real-world application, the Wyss Center de-risks emerging neuro technologies and influences their path to clinical and commercial viability.

Through close collaboration with ventures, academic institutions, hospitals, and industry partners, the Wyss Center fosters the development of impactful solutions for brain health to improve the lives of patients.

The center was founded by Swiss entrepreneur and philanthropist, Hansjörg Wyss, who previously created the Wyss Institute for Biologically Inspired Engineering in the United States. Since 1 July 2026, the Wyss Center has been under the leadership of Dr. Tracy Laabs, who assumed the role of Director.

The founding director of the Wyss Center was neuroscientist Professor John P. Donoghue, who is best known for his work on human brain-computer interfaces, brain function and plasticity.

Based at Campus Biotech (in the former Merck Serono building) in Geneva, Switzerland, the Wyss Center aims to innovate and accelerate the development of technologies and therapies for brain health.

The Wyss Center works in the areas of neuromodulation, neuroengineering, neuroAI, and neuroimaging to reveal unique insights into the mechanisms underlying brain dynamics and help develop life-changing treatments.

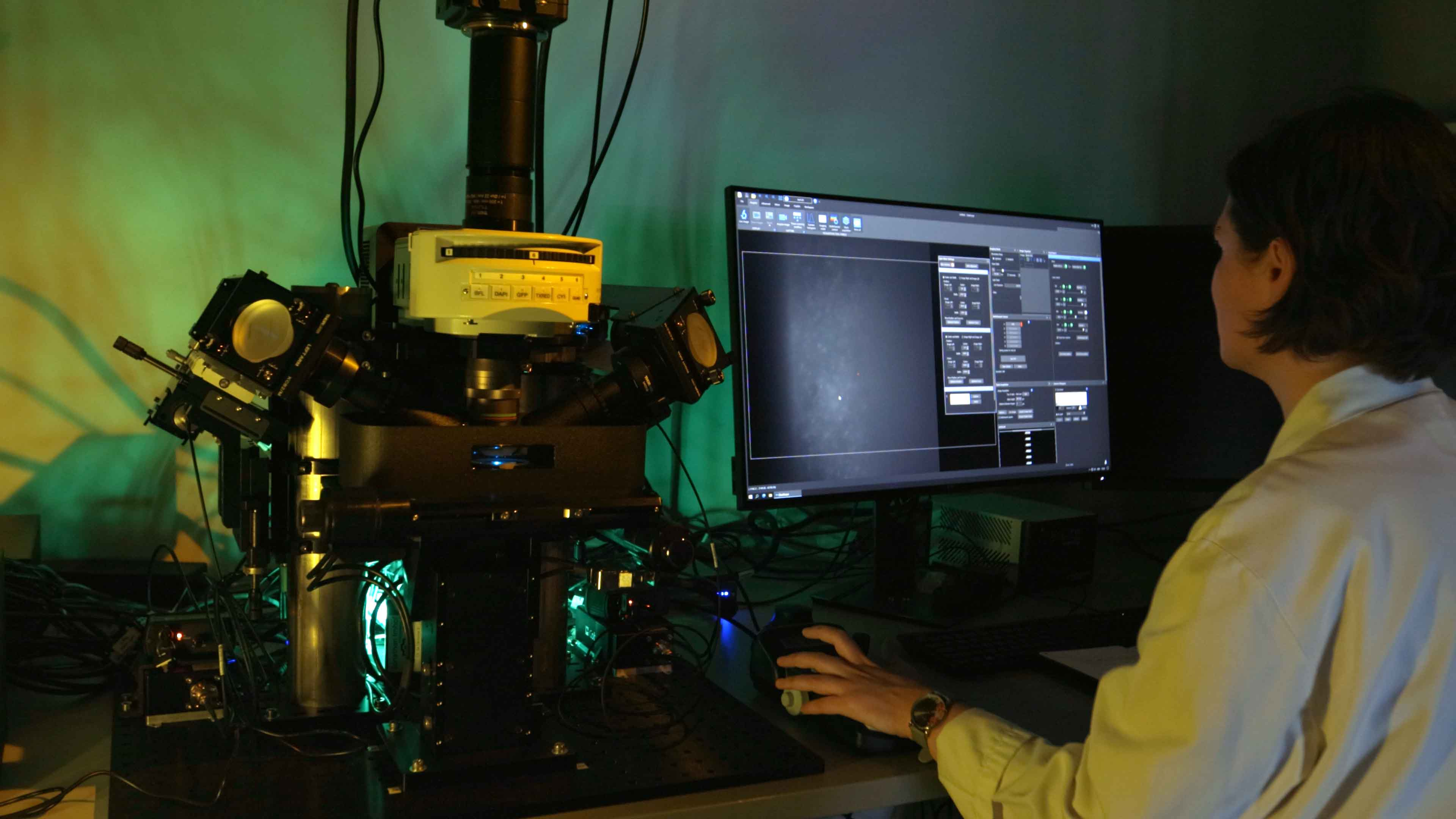
Lightsheet microscopes in the Advanced Lightsheet Imaging Center (ALICe) can image neurons within whole organs at high spatial and temporal resolution.

== See also ==
- Wyss Center Geneva
- Campus Biotech
- Wyss Institute for Biologically Inspired Engineering
