= Constantine Gatsonis =

American biostatistician

- Born: Velanidia, Kozani, Greece
- Education: Princeton University; Cornell University
- Scientific career
- Workplaces: Brown University SPH
- Doctoral advisor: Lawrence D. Brown
- Doctoral students: Vanja Dukic

Constantine Achilleos Gatsonis is a Greek-born biostatistician, currently the Henry Ledyard Goddard University Professor of Biostatistics, Chair of Biostatistics and Founding Director for the Center for Statistical Sciences at the Brown University School of Public Health. He is well known for his work with evaluation of diagnostic and screening tests.

Gatsonis is a Fellow of the American Statistical Association and AcademyHealth. He was also Founding Editor in Chief of Springer's Health Services and Outcomes Research Methodology.

== Early life and education ==
Constantine A. Gatsonis was born in Velanidia, Kozani—a small village in Western Macedonia, Greece. During the final two years of secondary school, he attended Athens College in Athens on a scholarship. Gatsonis enrolled in Union College, attending for a year before transferring to Princeton University. He studied math at Princeton, graduating in 1976; Gatsonis enrolled at Cornell University for graduate studies, completing a doctorate in mathematical statistics in 1981.

== Career ==
After graduating Gatsonis worked briefly at Rutgers University–New Brunswick, the University of Massachusetts Amherst, and Carnegie Mellon University. At Carnegie Mellon, he became interested in biostatistics; in 1988 he became an assistant professor at Harvard Medical School. At Harvard where Gatsonis was a founding member of the Department of Health Care Policy. In January 1995, Gatsonis moved to Brown University, where he founded the Center for Statistical Sciences. During this time, Gatsonis worked to develop a biostatistics program within the Alpert Medical School's Department of Community Health (later the School of Public Health). In 2011, Gatsonis became chair of Brown's Department of Biostatistics.

In 2003, he was the Spinoza Visiting Professor at University of Amsterdam.

=== Awards and honors ===
- In 2019, Gastonis was named Mosteller Statistician of the Year by the Boston Chapter of the American Statistical Association (ASA)
- Gatsonis received the 2018 Marvin Zelen Leadership Award in Statistical Science from the Harvard T.H. Chan School of Public Health.
