= Brown University School of Public Health =

Private school in Providence, Rhode Island

Coordinates: 41.82370°N 71.40675°W

- Type: School of public health
- Established: 2013; 13 years ago
- Parent institution: Brown University
- Accreditation: CEPH
- Dean: Francesca Beaudoin (interim)
- Academic staff: 114 (core); 190 (affiliates)
- Students: 410
- Undergraduates: 179
- Postgraduates: 149
- Doctoral students: 82
- Location: Providence, Rhode Island, US
- Website: sph.brown.edu

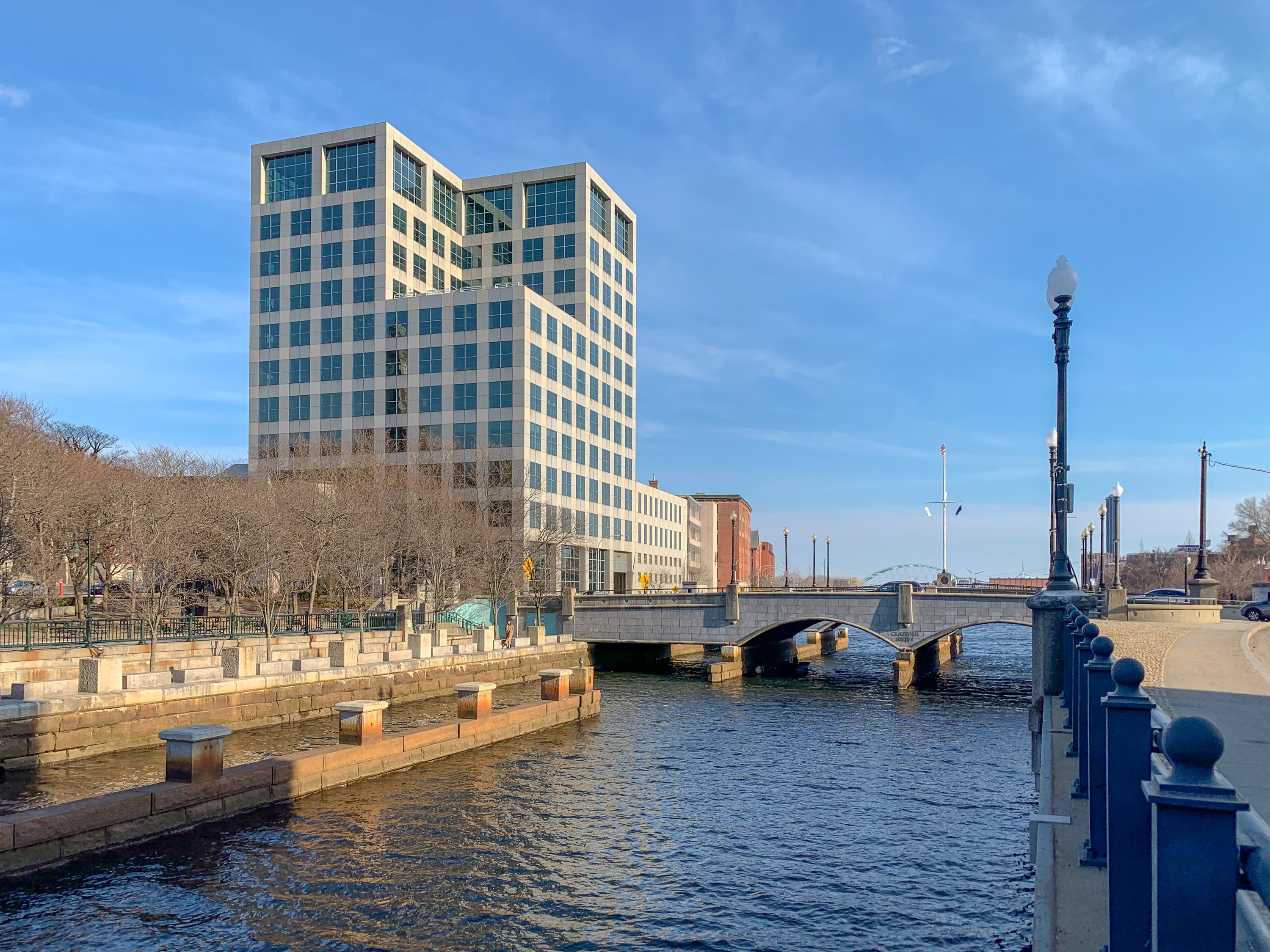
View of the primary building of the Brown University School of Public Health and the Providence River

The Brown University School of Public Health is the public health school of Brown University, a private research university in Rhode Island. It is located along the Providence River, a quarter mile from Brown's central campus on College Hill. The School of Public Health grew out of the Department of Community Health at Brown's Warren Alpert Medical School and was officially founded in 2013 as an independent school.

The school offers undergraduate, graduate, and doctoral programs as well as a dual degree program in conjunction with Brown's Watson School of International and Public Affairs. Academics are organized around four departments: Behavioral and Social Sciences, Biostatistics, Epidemiology, and Health Services, Policy & Practice.

In 2025, among schools of public health in the United States, the school receives the seventh most funding from the National Institutes of Health.

== History ==
Brown traces its School of Public Health to 1916, when the Corporation established a course of study leading to a Doctorate in Public Health. In 1971, Brown founded the Department of Community Health as a constituent department of the university's Warren Alpert Medical School. The Program in Public Health was relocated from Brown's main campus on College Hill to a downtown location at 121 South Main Street in 2006. Further programs were developed over the subsequent decades, culminating with the establishment of the School of Public Health in February 2013. The school was awarded CEPH accreditation in 2016.

=== Expansion and COVID-19 initiatives ===
In 2021, Brown acquired the adjacent property at 155 S. Main St. to accommodate future growth of the school. The same year, the school saw a 116% increase in applications for its Master's in Public Health Program. Accordingly, the school announced a planned expansion of the program to roughly 90 students.

In August 2021, the University established the Long Covid Initiative with a $1 million grant from the Hassenfeld Family Foundation. The initiative will compile and communicate research on post-COVID-19 syndrome and develop policy recommendations. The same month, researchers at the school were awarded a $4.9 million grant from the CDC to study the duration of protective immunity offered by COVID-19 vaccines among nursing home residents.

In 2022, the school announced the launch of an online-only Master of Public Health program.

=== Dean ===
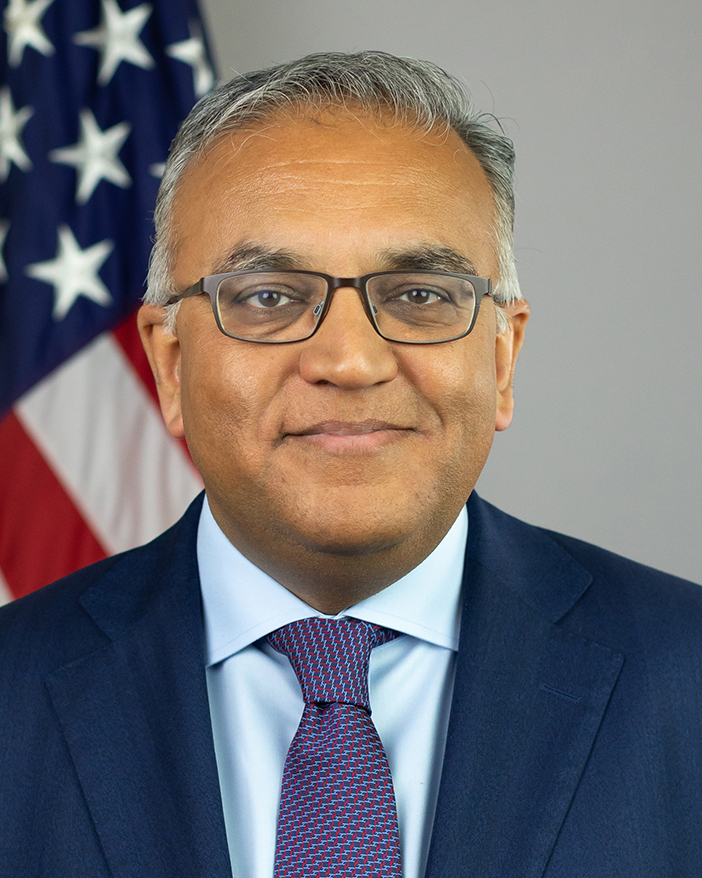
Ashish Jha, Dean

Since the school's founding, three individuals have served as dean. Terrie Fox Wetle served as the school's inaugural dean from 2013 to 2017. In 2017, she was succeeded by Bess Marcus who served as dean until 2020. Ashish Jha was appointed the school's third dean in 2020. In March 2022, Jha was selected by Joe Biden to serve as the White House Coronavirus Response Coordinator; during Jha's assignment, Ronald Aubert served as interim dean of the school.

== Academics ==
Brown's School of Public Health offers undergraduate, graduate, doctoral, and dual-degree programs.

Two of Brown's undergraduate majors are offered through the School of Public Health: Public Health (A.B.) and Statistics (Sc.B.). The school also offers undergraduate students the opportunity to pursue a Master of Public Health degree during a fifth year.

At the postgraduate level, the school offers masters programs in Public Health (MPH) and Biostatistics (Sc.M.)

Doctoral (Ph.D.) programs are offered in Behavioral and Social Health Sciences, Biostatistics, Epidemiology, and Health Services Research.

The School of Public Health offers an MPH/MPA program in conjunction with the Watson School of International and Public Affairs.

== Rankings ==
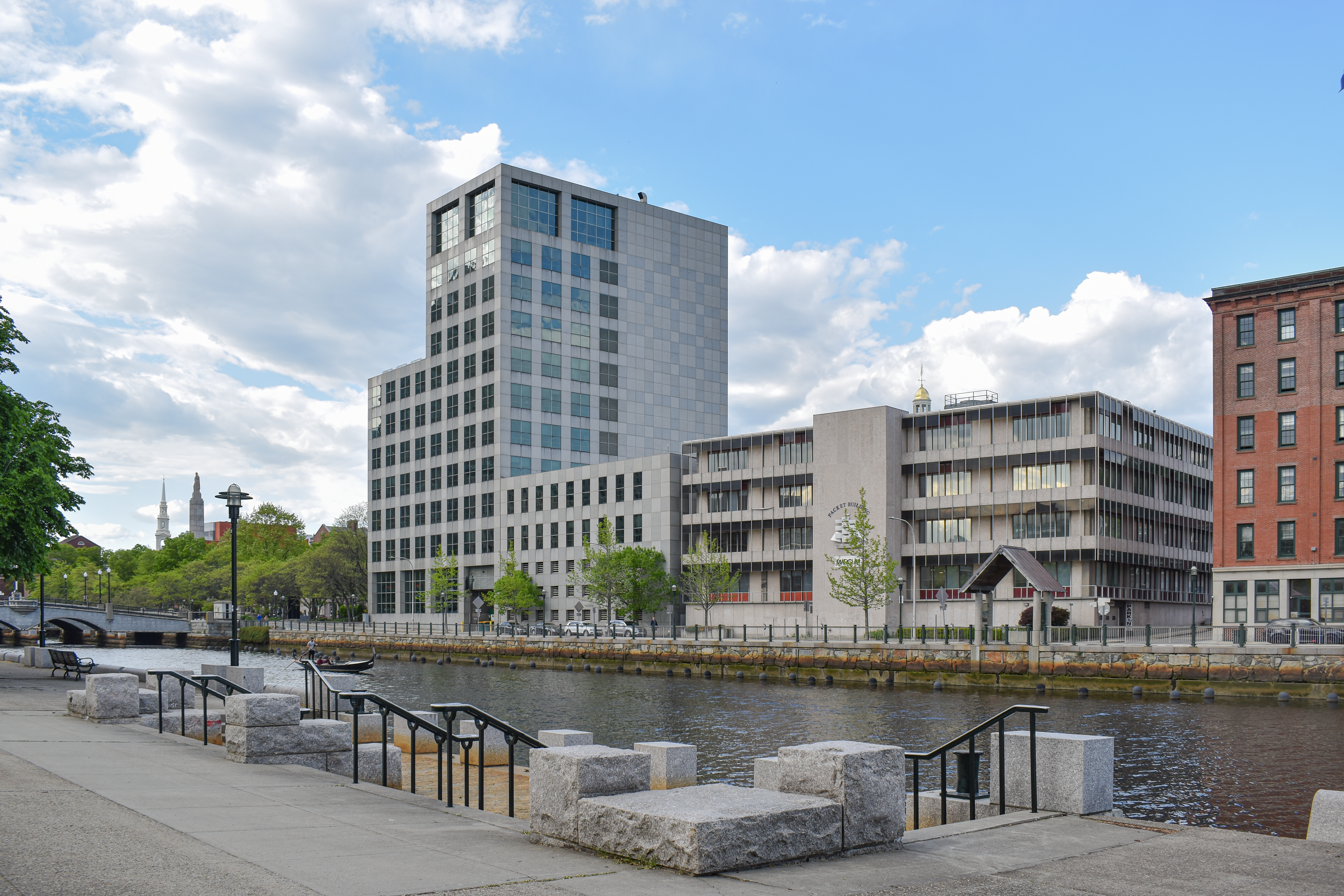
The school in 2021

As of 2025, the Brown University School of Public Health is ranked as the 19th best public health school in the United States, and Brown's biostatistics program the 13th best, by U.S. News & World Report.

In 2021, Niche ranked Brown 3rd—behind Harvard University and Johns Hopkins University—on their list of Best Colleges for Public Health in America.

In 2021, the school received $65,319,136 in NIH awards, the 4th most of any school of public health in the United States.

== Notable people ==
=== Faculty ===
- Judson A. Brewer, Director of Research and Innovation at the Mindfulness Center and Professor of Behavioral and Social Sciences
- Elizabeth Cameron, Professor of the Practice of Health Services, Policy and Practice
- Lorin Crawford, RGSS Assistant Professor of Biostatistics
- Constantine Gatsonis, Henry Ledyard Goddard University Professor of Biostatistics, Chair of Biostatistics, and Founding Director for the Center for Statistical Scientists
- Rebecca Hubbard, Professor of Biostatistics and Data Science
- Wilmot James, Professor
- Ashish Jha, Dean, Professor of Health Services, Policy and Practice; White House Coronavirus Response Coordinator (2022–2023)
- David C. Lewis, Professor Emeritus of Community Health and Donald G. Millar Distinguished Professor Emeritus of Alcohol and Addiction Studies
- Simin Liu, Professor of Epidemiology
- Bess Marcus, Professor of Behavioral and Social Sciences and former dean of the school
- Peter Monti, Donald G. Millar Distinguished Professor of Alcohol and Addiction Studies and Director, Center for Alcohol and Addiction Studies
- Jennifer Nuzzo, Director of the Center for Pandemic Preparedness and Response
- Scott Rivkees, Professor of the Practice; Surgeon General of Florida (2019–21)
- David A. Savitz, Professor of Epidemiology
- Christopher H. Schmid, Chair of the Department of Biostatistics
- Ira Wilson, Professor and Chair of Health Services, Policy and Practice

=== Alumni ===
- Khaled Almilaji (2016–17), Syrian doctor and medical humanitarian
- Cheryl A. M. Anderson (B.A. 1992), Founding Dean, UC, San Diego School of Public Health
- Nicole Alexander-Scott (M.P.H., 2011), Director, Rhode Island Department of Health
- Tiara Mack (B.A. 2016), Member of the Rhode Island Senate from the 6th district (2020–)
- Megan Ranney (M.P.H. 2010), Dean, Yale School of Public Health
