= Velanidia =

Velanidia (Greek: Βελανίδια) may refer to several villages in Greece:

- Velanidia, Laconia, a village in Laconia
- Velanidia, Messenia, a village in Messenia
- Velanidia, Kozani, a village in the Kozani regional unit
