= Victor J. Torres =

Puerto Rican-American microbiologist

- Born: 1977 (age 48–49); Rincón, Puerto Rico
- Citizenship: United States
- Education: University of Puerto Rico at Mayagüez (BS); Vanderbilt University (Ph.D.)
- Awards: Burroughs Wellcome Grant (2014); MacArthur Fellowship (2021)
- Scientific career
- Fields: microbiology, immunology
- Workplaces: St. Jude Children's Research Hospital

Victor J. Torres is an American microbiologist. He is the Albert and Rosemary Joseph Endowed Chair of the Department of Host-Microbe Interactions at St. Jude Children's Research Hospital, where he also serves as director of the Center for Infectious Diseases Research. He is a 2021 MacArthur Fellow.

== Education ==
1995−2000, Bachelor of Sciences: Concentration in Industrial Microbiology, University of Puerto Rico at Mayagüez, Mayagüez, Puerto Rico.

2000−2004, Doctor of Philosophy (PhD): Microbiology and Immunology, Vanderbilt University School of Medicine, Nashville, Tennessee.

2005, Postdoctoral Fellow: Division of Infectious Diseases, Vanderbilt University School of Medicine, Nashville, Tennessee.

2006−2008, Postdoctoral Fellow: Department of Microbiology and Immunology, Vanderbilt University School of Medicine, Nashville, Tennessee. .
