= Simin Liu =

American physician researcher

- 劉思敏
- Education: Jinan University; University at Albany, SUNY; Harvard School of Public Health
- Scientific career
- Workplaces: University of California, Irvine School of Medicine; Alpert Medical School; Brown University School of Public Health; Harvard School of Public Health; UCLA School of Medicine; UCLA School of Public Health; Centers for Disease Control and Prevention

Simin Liu (Chinese: 劉思敏) is an American physician-scientist and epidemiologist. He is recognized internationally for his leadership in the research of nutrition, genetics, epidemiology, and the environmental and biological determinants of complex diseases, particularly those related to cardiometabolic health in diverse populations. His research has pioneered novel concepts, uncovered critical mechanisms and risk factors, and developed research frameworks for diabetes and cardiovascular diseases. A hallmark of Liu's work is when his lab was among the first to define and quantify dietary glycemic load in humans, providing key insights into the functional role of dietary carbohydrates in the development of health outcomes. This novel nutritional concept has since become a cornerstone of clinical diabetes management, nutritional epidemiology, and dietary feeding trials in diverse populations worldwide.

As an epidemiologist and physician-scientist, Liu has cultivated a global collaborative community for evidence-based clinical and population health precision practices aimed at chronic disease prevention and control. In China and Brazil, he has helped colleagues develop clinical and population studies on cardiometabolic outcomes spanning lifespans and generations. These studies provide opportunities for public health investigators to address questions in biological, clinical, and public health research. His work in global health has fostered a collaborative environment for innovation and cross-disciplinary research. Liu's collaborations extend both domestically and internationally, with the team engaging in research collaborations, teaching, and service activities across six of the seven continents.

Liu has received more than $20 million in extramural grant funding, published more than 400 peer-reviewed works, and served on more than 100 committees, advisory boards, and service events. As of November 2024, Liu has over 187,809 citations and an h-index of 155 on Google Scholar.

== Education ==
He earned his medical degree from Jinan University School of Medicine in 1991. He then earned his M.S. in epidemiology from SUNY Albany in 1993. Liu went on to receive his MPH and ScD in both epidemiology and nutrition from Harvard University in 1998. Liu also completed a fellowship in public health and preventive medicine in the Epidemic Intelligence Service (EIS) program at the Centers for Disease Control and Prevention.

== Career ==
Liu is currently the Distinguished Professor of Medicine at the University of California, Irvine School of Medicine and the chair of the Department of Epidemiology and Biostatistics. He also holds adjunct professorships at the Brown University School of Public Health and the Harvard T.H. Chan School of Public Health. Before joining the faculty at UC Irvine, he was a professor of epidemiology at Brown University School of Public Health and professor of medicine (endocrinology) at the Alpert Medical School. At Brown, he also served as the director of the Center for Global Cardiometabolic Health (CGCH) and has contributed to building several research and training programs in the global health space through a specialized blend of study in genomics, nutrition, and environmental science. Earlier in his career, Liu was the founding director of the UCLA Burroughs Wellcome Fund (BWF) Inter-school Program in Metabolic Diseases and the Center for Metabolic Disease Prevention, one of the few transdisciplinary doctoral programs in the country providing integrative training in population-based quantitative and biological sciences. From 2005 to 2013, he served as professor of epidemiology, medicine, and OBGYN at University of California, Los Angeles. From 1998 to 2005, Liu held positions as an instructor, assistant professor, and associate professor of medicine at Harvard Medical School and Brigham and Women's Hospital in Boston, as well as assistant and associate professor of epidemiology at the Harvard T.H. Chan School of Public Health. He currently serves as an associate editor for The American Journal of Clinical Nutrition.

== Awards ==
He has served on several national and international committees and advisory board for the NIH, the CDC, the Chinese CDC, the Canadian Institutes of Health Research and Canadian Foundation for Innovation, the British Medical Research Councils(MRC), and the World Health Organization (WHO) addressing policy issues in both medicine and public health.

- 1993-1995 Fellow in Epidemiology, Epidemic Intelligence Service (EIS), Centers for Disease Control and Prevention (CDC)
- 1996 Arthur T. Lyman and Henry S. Grew Scholarship at Harvard University
- 2004 Elected Fellow, Council on Epidemiology and Prevention, American Heart Association (FAHA)
- 2012 Elected Member, American Epidemiological Society (AES)
- 2012 Elected Member, American Society of Clinical Investigation (ASCI)
- 2016 Awardee, Genomic and Precision Medicine Mentoring Award
- 2019 Awardee, Fulbright Distinguished Chair in Global Health
- 2020 Anandi L. Sharma Visiting professor of Cardiovascular Medicine at Mount Sinai Heart, the Icahn School of Medicine of Mount Sinai
- 2022 Awardee, Scott Grundy Award for Excellence in Metabolism Research, AHA
- 2022 Visiting Professorship Awarded by CAPES/PRINT, Universidade Federal de São Paulo (UNIFESP), Ministry of Education, Brazil
