= Savitz =

Savitz is a surname. Notable people with the surname include:

- David A. Savitz, American epidemiologist
- Ed Savitz (1942–1993), American businessman and criminal
