= Judson A. Brewer =

American psychiatrist, neuroscientist and author

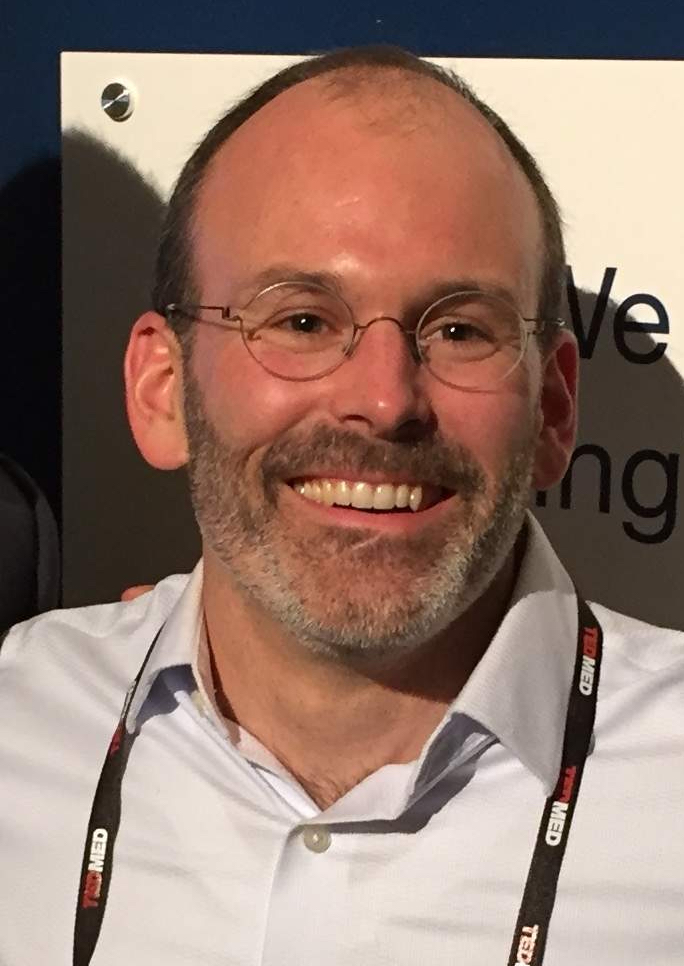
- Born: Judson Alyn Brewer; 1974 (age 51–52)
- Citizenship: American
- Occupations: Neuroscientist, psychiatrist, and author
- Known for: Mindfulness programs for habit change; Unwinding Anxiety (2021 book); A Simple Way to Break a Bad Habit (2016 TED Talk)

Academic background
- Education: Princeton University; Washington University in St. Louis; Yale University

Academic work
- Institutions: Brown University School of Public Health; Alpert Medical School; University of Massachusetts Medical School; Yale University School of Medicine
- Main interests: Habit change; Mindfulness; Anxiety; Addictions; Overeating
- Website: https://www.drjud.com/ https://judbrewer.substack.com/

Judson Alyn Brewer (born 1974) is an American neuroscientist, psychiatrist, and New York Times best-selling author. He is the director of research and innovation at Brown University's Mindfulness Center, and a professor of psychiatry and behavioral and social sciences at Brown's schools of public health and medicine. He studies mindfulness and how our brains form negative behavior patterns, and has used his research to create treatment programs for anxiety, addictions, and unhealthy habits. Brewer founded MindSciences, Inc. (now known as DrJud), an app-based therapy program for anxiety, overeating and smoking.

== Education ==
Brewer earned his B.A. in chemistry from Princeton University, where he graduated cum laude, and his M.D./Ph.D. from Washington University School of Medicine in St. Louis. His Ph.D. was in immunology, and his dissertation explored the immune system's regulation of stress hormones (The Role of Glucocorticoids in Immune System Development). While at Washington University, he became interested in mindfulness meditation and worked in the laboratory of Louis J. Muglia. Brewer attended high school at Brebeuf Preparatory School in Indianapolis.

After training in mindfulness meditation during his medical and graduate studies, Brewer completed a psychiatry residency at the Yale School of Medicine—where he was chief resident of Yale's neuroscience unit—followed by a fellowship in substance abuse. He is board certified in psychiatry from the American Board of Psychiatry and Neurology.

== Career ==
=== Academia ===
In Brewer's early career, he was an assistant professor of psychiatry at the Yale School of Medicine and the medical director of Yale's Therapeutic Neuroscience Clinic. He then joined the University of Massachusetts Medical School as an associate professor and research director of the Mindfulness Center. For ten years, he was a research affiliate at MIT's Department of Brain and Cognitive Sciences. In 2018, he joined the faculty of Brown University, where he is the director of research and innovation at the Mindfulness Center and a professor of psychiatry and social and behavioral sciences.

Brewer began meditating to deal with stress while a graduate student at Washington University School of Medicine. In 2011, he and colleagues published a study reporting, "the brains of experienced meditators—those who have been meditating for at least 10 years—showed decreased activity in the areas linked to attention lapses, anxiety, attention-deficit hyperactivity disorder, schizophrenia, autism, and plaque buildup in Alzheimer disease. This effect was seen regardless of the type of meditation practiced. The areas in question comprise the default mode network, which consists of the medial prefrontal and posterior cingulate cortices."

Michael Pollan wrote that in 2012, Brewer, "using fMRI to study the brains of experienced meditators, noticed that their default-mode networks had also been quieted relative to those of novice meditators. It appears that, with the ego temporarily out of commission, the boundaries between self and world, subject and object, all dissolve. These are hallmarks of the mystical experience."

By 2013 Brewer's focus was on "neurobiological mechanisms underlying the interface between stress, mindfulness and the addictive process, and in developing effective means for the modulation of these processes to better treat substance use disorders." He was also developing measurements of mindfulness practice, using functional MRI methods with real-time feedback to examine effects of mindfulness-training on brain function and mental health.

In 2012, Brewer founded MindSciences, Inc. to create app-based digital therapeutics programs based on the mindfulness training and research he pursued in his lab at Yale University. The company's apps are built on his research and the experiences of thousands of users both in clinical trials and real-world use. The apps include: "Unwinding Anxiety" for anxiety and stress reduction, "Eat Right Now" for dysfunctional eating and "Craving To Quit" for smoking cessation. Clinical research from 2017 showed a 40% decrease in craving-related eating after two months of using the "Eat Right Now" app. A study on the "Craving To Quit" app found a mechanistic link between reductions in brain reactivity to smoking cues and reductions in cigarette smoking that were specific only to mindfulness training, compared to the National Cancer Institute's QuitGuide app. A single arm study of Unwinding Anxiety published in 2020 found a 57% reduction in anxiety in anxious physicians. A randomized controlled trial of Unwinding Anxiety published in 2021 found a 67% reduction in anxiety in people with Generalized Anxiety Disorder (vs. 14% with usual clinical care). In 2019, MindSciences launched a portal. In 2019 and 2020, MindSciences won the "Health Value Award in Behavioral Health Management", an award "to recognize outstanding services, products, and programs across 34 categories spanning the healthcare industry". Mindsciences was acquired by Sharecare Inc. (Nasdaq SHCR) in 2020.

In 2023 Brewer co-founded College Journey to help high school students navigate the stress of the college application process.

As of 2024, Brewer's research studies have been cited over 15,000 times.

=== Clinical ===
Brewer's clinical practice has specialized in habit change ranging from anxiety to unhealthy eating to addiction. He began his career at the Veteran's Administration Hospital in West Haven, CT where he was also an assistant professor in the department of psychiatry at the Yale School of Medicine. In 2018, he joined the faculty at the School of Public Health and the Warren Alpert Medical School at Brown University. In 2023, he co-founded Mindshift Recovery, a non-profit organization based on his research, dedicated to helping individuals with addiction that combines app-based training with peer mentorship.

==== Key teachings ====
Brewer uses U Pandita's quote to illustrate the difference between dopamine secretions and joy: "In their quest for happiness, people mistake excitement of the mind for real happiness." He advises using curiosity as a hack to move the brain's attention away from anxiety and cravings.

=== Media appearances ===
In an article titled "Our 8 Favorite Books in 2021 for Healthy Living," Tara Parker-Pope wrote in The New York Times that "Dr. Brewer's innovative approach in his new book is to view anxiety as a habit that can be broken." In 2021, Ezra Klein interviewed Brewer about his "counterintuitive approach to dealing with worry, craving and anxiety" for The Ezra Klein Show.

Markham Heid of Time quoted Brewer's explanation of his research findings in 2014: "Basically, meditation helps your brain get out of its own way... It's mostly about being aware of your thoughts and not running after them in your mind." Brewer also had begun to focus on "how mindfulness practice can affect learning processes leading to positive habit change", translating research findings into clinical use, specifically with clinical trials of smoking cessation using neurofeedback with mindfulness. Sandra Gray of UMass Boston wrote of "the striking impact of mindfulness on people trying to quit smoking", describing his interview with Meghna Chakrabarti on WBUR's Radio Boston. Brewer had said, "It seems that in experienced meditators some of these regions [associated with the brain's default mode network] get pretty quiet when they are meditating. There's an activity change in the brain. There's a lot more work to be done, but it's probably letting go of some of these pathways that are laid down each time someone uses."

On 60 Minutes, Anderson Cooper featured his own experiences at a mindfulness meditation retreat and visited Brewer "to learn more about the cutting-edge brain imaging research he is conducting to confirm that mindfulness can be an effective treatment for addictions to everything from food to tobacco to opioids—even to electronic devices like cell phones."

In addition, Farrah Jarral of Al Jazeera noted in 2016 that traditional addiction treatments have a relapse rate of 70 percent, and she featured Brewer's research, describing him as "a psychiatrist who is using the power of the mind to overcome addiction". Fran Smith wrote in 2017, "In a head-to-head comparison, Brewer showed that mindfulness training was twice as effective as the gold-standard behavioral antismoking program."

Smith added:

Mindfulness trains people to pay attention to cravings without reacting to them. The idea is to ride out the wave of intense desire. Mindfulness also encourages people to notice why they feel pulled to indulge. Brewer and others have shown that meditation quiets the posterior cingulate cortex, the neural space involved in the kind of rumination that can lead to a loop of obsession.

— Fran Smith, National Geographic

When Amanda Lang of Bloomberg TV Canada asked Brewer why employers are interested in mindfulness, he said if employees can develop the wisdom to understand how they and their co-workers' minds work, it could help all work together in a much more seamless manner. When asked about the possible downsides, he did not offer any negatives associated with such a change, but he did mention the importance of working with a teacher or facilitator. Responding to a question from Kevin Kruse of Forbes about the "reward-based learning" model and the role of dopamine in the brain, Brewer said, "Dopamine, it seems, is there to help us learn things. So for example, when something novel happens, we get a spritz of dopamine in our nucleus accumbens. And when this process starts, we get habituated when we have the same thing happen over and over and over." He then described the practice of mindfulness:

Mindfulness is really about paying attention to all aspects of our experience, but in particular we can pay attention to the push and pull of cravings. So if there is something pleasant and we want more of it, we kind of hold on to it or we move toward it and try to get it. If there is something unpleasant we want it to go away as quickly as possible. So there is also movement there. There is the push and pull. Mindfulness is really about noticing that push and pull and not getting caught up in that movement. So just being with whatever is, in a way that's curious, more than driven.

— Judson Brewer, Forbes interview, 2017

Charlotte Liebman quoted Brewer's explanation of counter-productive self-criticism: "When we get caught up in self-referential thinking — the type that happens with rumination, worry, guilt or self-judgment — it activates self-referential brain networks... When we let go of that mental chatter and go easy on ourselves, these same brain regions quiet down." To achieve self-compassion, Brewer recommended using "any practice that helps us stay in the moment and notice what it feels like to get caught up. See how painful that is compared to being kind to ourselves." Brewer has also addressed the "empty your mind" misconception about meditation: "Meditation is not about emptying our minds or stopping our thoughts, which is impossible... It's about changing our relationships to our thoughts."

==== TED Talk ====
The subject of Brewer's 2015 TED Talk was "A simple way to break a bad habit". It was the fourth most popular TED talk of the year and as of 2019 had been viewed more than 19 million times.

== Personal life ==
Brewer grew up in Indianapolis, Indiana. As a boy, he delivered papers for the Indianapolis News and later received a college scholarship sponsored by the newspaper. Brewer and his wife Mahri live in Massachusetts, where they enjoy hiking, biking, and meditating.

== Selected publications ==
=== Books ===
- Brewer, Judson (2024). THE HUNGER HABIT: Why We Eat When We're Not Hungry and How to Stop. New York: Avery Press. ISBN 978-0-593-54325-2.
- Brewer, Judson (2021). Unwinding anxiety: new science shows how to break the cycles of worry and fear to heal your mind (New York Times best-seller). New York: Avery Press. ISBN 978-0-593-33044-9. OCLC 1198989364.
- Brewer, Judson (2017). The craving mind: from cigarettes to smartphones to love - why we get hooked and how we can break bad habits. New Haven: Yale University Press. ISBN 978-0-300-22760-4. OCLC 974372629.
- Brewer, Judson A; King, Katherine Y (1999). Complementary/alternative medicine: a physician's guide. St. Louis. OCLC 145609301.

=== Journal articles ===
- Ludwig, V. U., Brown, K. W., Brewer, J. A., (2020) "Self-regulation without force: can awareness leverage reward to drive behavior change?" Perspectives on Psychological Science 15(6):1382–99.
- Brewer, J. A., Roy, A. H., Deluty, A., Liu, T., Hoge, E. A., (2020) "Can Mindfulness Mechanistically Target Worry to Improve Sleep Disturbances? Theory and Study Protocol for App-Based Anxiety Program." Health Psychology. 39(9): 776–84.
- Roy, A. H., Druker, S., Hoge, E. A., Brewer, J. A., (2020) "Physician anxiety and burnout. Is mindfulness a solution? Symptom correlates and a pilot study of app-delivered mindfulness training." JMIR mHealth uHealth 8(4):e15608.
- Pbert, L., Druker, S., Crawford, S., Frisard, C., Trivedi, M., Osganian, S. K., Brewer, J. A., (2020) ''Feasibility of a Smartphone App with Mindfulness Training for Adolescent Smoking Cessation: Craving to Quit (C2Q)-Teen. Mindfulness 11: 720–733.
- Richey, J. A., Brewer, J. A., Sullivan-Toole, B. S., Strege, M. V., Kim-Spoon, J., White, S. W., Ollendick, T. H., (2019) ''Sensitivity shift theory: A developmental model of positive affect and motivational deficits in social anxiety disorder." Clinical Psychology Review 72:101756.
- Roos, C. R., Brewer, J. A., O'Malley, S. S., Garrison, K. A., (2019) "Baseline craving strength as a prognostic predictor of benefit from smartphone app-based mindfulness training for smoking cessation." Mindfulness 10(10): 2165-2171.
- Janes, A.C., Datko, M., Roy, A., Barton, B., Druker, S., Neal, C., Ohashi, K., Benoit, H., van Lutterveld, R., Brewer, J. A., (2019) ''Quitting starts in the brain: a randomized controlled trial of app-based mindfulness shows decreases in neural responses to smoking cues that predict reductions in smoking.'' Neuropsychopharmacology 44:1631–1638
- Brewer, Judson (January 28, 2019). "Mindfulness training for addictions: has neuroscience revealed a brain hack by which awareness subverts the addictive process?". Current Opinion in Psychology. 28: 198–203. doi:10.1016/j.copsyc.2019.01.014. ISSN 2352-2518. PMID 30785066. S2CID 73468626.
- Brewer, Judson A.; Ruf, Andrea; Beccia, Ariel L.; Essien, Gloria I.; Finn, Leonard M.; van Lutterveld, Remko; Mason, Ashley E. (2018). "Can Mindfulness Address Maladaptive Eating Behaviors? Why Traditional Diet Plans Fail and How New Mechanistic Insights May Lead to Novel Interventions". Frontiers in Psychology. 9 1418. doi:10.3389/fpsyg.2018.01418. ISSN 1664-1078. PMC 6139346. PMID 30250438.
- Garrison, Kathleen A.; Pal, Prasanta; O'Malley, Stephanie S.; Pittman, Brian P.; Gueorguieva, Ralitza; Rojiani, Rahil; Scheinost, Dustin; Dallery, Jesse; Brewer, Judson A. (June 18, 2018). "Craving to Quit: A Randomized Controlled Trial of Smartphone app-based Mindfulness Training for Smoking Cessation". Nicotine & Tobacco Research. 22 (3): 324–331. doi:10.1093/ntr/nty126. ISSN 1469-994X. PMC 7297096. PMID 29917096.
- Mason, Ashley E.; Jhaveri, Kinnari; Cohn, Michael; Brewer, Judson A. (April 2018). "Testing a mobile mindful eating intervention targeting craving-related eating: feasibility and proof of concept". Journal of Behavioral Medicine. 41 (2): 160–173. doi:10.1007/s10865-017-9884-5. ISSN 1573-3521. PMC 5844778. PMID 28918456.
- van Lutterveld, R., Houlihan, S. D., Pal, P., Sacchet, M. D., McFarlane-Blake, C., Patel, P. R., Sullivan, J. S., Ossadtchi, A., Druker, S., Bauer, C., Brewer, J. A., (2017)"Source-space EEG neurofeedback links subjective experience with brain activity during effortless awareness meditation." NeuroImage 151(1): 117-27.
- Garrison, Kathleen A.; Zeffiro, Thomas A.; Scheinost, Dustin; Constable, R. Todd; Brewer, Judson A. (September 2015). "Meditation leads to reduced default mode network activity beyond an active task". Cognitive, Affective, & Behavioral Neuroscience. 15 (3): 712–720. doi:10.3758/s13415-015-0358-3. ISSN 1531-135X. PMC 4529365. PMID 25904238.
- Garrison, K. M., Scheinost, D., Constable, R. T., Brewer, J. A. (2014) "Neural activity and functional connectivity of loving kindness meditation." Brain and Behavior 4(3): 337-47.
- Brewer, Judson A.; Garrison, Kathleen A.; Whitfield-Gabrieli, Susan (October 2, 2013). "What about the "Self" is Processed in the Posterior Cingulate Cortex?". Frontiers in Human Neuroscience. 7: 647. doi:10.3389/fnhum.2013.00647. ISSN 1662-5161. PMC 3788347. PMID 24106472.
- Garrison, K. M., Santoyo, J. F., Davis, J. H., Thornhill IV, T. A., Thompson, Kerr, C. E., Brewer, J. A. (2013) "Effortless awareness: using real-time neurofeedback to probe correlates of posterior cingulate cortex activity in meditators' self-report." Frontiers in Human Neuroscience 7: 440.
- Garrison, Kathleen A.; Scheinost, Dustin; Worhunsky, Patrick D.; Elwafi, Hani M.; Thornhill, Thomas A.; Thompson, Evan; Saron, Clifford; Desbordes, Gaëlle; Kober, Hedy (November 1, 2013). "Real-time fMRI links subjective experience with brain activity during focused attention". NeuroImage. 81: 110–118. doi:10.1016/j.neuroimage.2013.05.030. ISSN 1095-9572. PMC 3729617. PMID 23684866.
- Brewer, Judson A.; Davis, Jake H.; Goldstein, Joseph (March 1, 2013). "Why is it so hard to pay attention, or is it? Mindfulness, the factors of awakening and reward-based learning". Mindfulness. 4 (1): 75–80. doi:10.1007/s12671-012-0164-8. ISSN 1868-8527. PMC 3827730. PMID 24244224.
- Elwafi, H. M., Witkiewitz, K., Mallik, S., Thornhill, T. A., Brewer, J. A., (2013) "Mechanisms of mindfulness training in smoking cessation: moderation of the relationship between craving and cigarette use." Drug and Alcohol Dependence 130(1–3): 222–29.
- Brewer, Judson A.; Elwafi, Hani M.; Davis, Jake H. (2014). "Craving to quit: Psychological models and neurobiological mechanisms of mindfulness training as treatment for addictions". Psychology of Addictive Behaviors. 27 (2): 366–79. doi:10.1037/2332-2136.1.s.70. ISSN 2332-2179. PMC 3434285. PMID 22642859.
- Brewer, Judson A.; Worhunsky, Patrick D.; Gray, Jeremy R.; Tang, Yi-Yuan; Weber, Jochen; Kober, Hedy (December 13, 2011). "Meditation experience is associated with differences in default mode network activity and connectivity". Proceedings of the National Academy of Sciences of the United States of America. 108 (50): 20254–20259. Bibcode:2011PNAS..10820254B. doi:10.1073/pnas.1112029108. ISSN 1091-6490. PMC 3250176. PMID 22114193.
- Van Dam, Nicholas T.; Brown, Anna; Mole, Tom B.; Davis, Jake H.; Britton, Willoughby B.; Brewer, Judson A. (2015). "Development and Validation of the Behavioral Tendencies Questionnaire". PLOS ONE. 10 (11) e0140867. Bibcode:2015PLoSO..1040867V. doi:10.1371/journal.pone.0140867. ISSN 1932-6203. PMC 4633225. PMID 26535904.

== See also ==
- Addiction psychiatry
- Addictive behavior
- Anxiety disorder
- Buddhist meditation
- Clinical neuroscience
- Research on meditation
