= Ira Wilson =

American physician and scholar of health services and policy

Ira Wilson FACP
- Education: Harvard College; Harvard Medical School; Harvard School of Public Health
- Scientific career
- Workplaces: Alpert Medical School; Brown University School of Public Health

Ira B. Wilson is an American physician and scholar of health services and policy. He is currently Professor of Medicine at Brown University's Alpert Medical School and Professor and Chair of Health Services, Policy and Practice at the Brown University School of Public Health.

Wilson received a Bachelor of Arts from Harvard College in 1979; he attended Harvard Medical School and the Harvard T.H. Chan School of Public Health earning an M.D. and M.Sc. in 1987 and 1993, respectively. Wilson completed his residency at Beth Israel Hospital in Boston, Massachusetts. From 1993 to 2010, he taught at the Tufts University School of Medicine and Tufts University Graduate School of Biomedical Sciences.

Wilson played a role in the development of Brown's program in community health into an independent School of Public Health.
