= Ashish Jha =

American physician (born 1970)

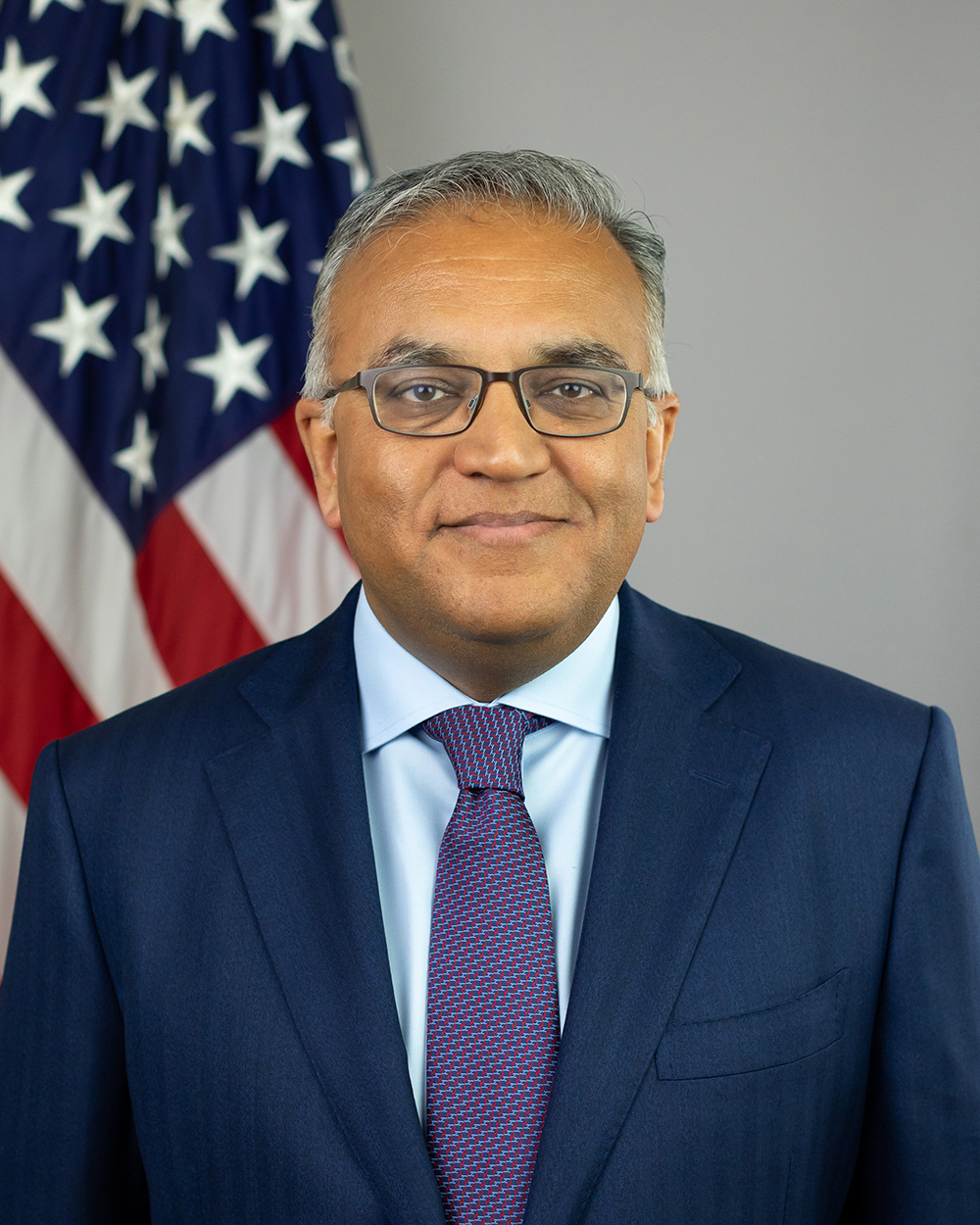

White House Coronavirus Response Coordinator
- In office April 5, 2022 – June 30, 2023
- President: Joe Biden
- Deputy: Lisa Barclay
- Preceded by: Jeff Zients
- Succeeded by: Position abolished

Dean, Brown University School of Public Health
- In office February 2020 – December 31, 2025
- Preceded by: Bess Marcus

Personal details
- Born: December 31, 1970 (age 55) Madhubani, India
- Education: Columbia University (BA); Harvard University (MD, MPH)

Ashish Kumar Jha (born December 31, 1970) is an American general internist physician and academic who served as the White House COVID-19 response coordinator from 2022 to 2023. He was Dean of the Brown University School of Public Health from 2020 to 2025. Prior to Brown, he was the K.T. Li Professor of Global Health at Harvard T.H. Chan School of Public Health, faculty director of the Harvard Global Health Institute, and a senior advisor at Albright Stonebridge Group. Jha is recognized as one of the leading health policy scholars in the nation. Jha's role at Brown University focused on improving the quality and cost of health care, and on the impact of public health policy.

== Education and early career ==
Ashish Kumar Jha was born in Pursaulia, Madhubani, Bihar, India, on December 31, 1970. Both of Jha's parents worked as educators. His family moved to Toronto, Canada, in 1979 and to Morris County, New Jersey, US in 1984.

Jha graduated from Boonton High School in Boonton, New Jersey, as the valedictorian of the class of 1988 and the editor in chief of the school's newspaper. He attended Columbia University, where he studied pre-med and economics and was president of Earl Hall's student governing board. Jha graduated from Columbia in 1992 with a B.A. in economics.

Jha received his M.D. from Harvard Medical School in 1997 and then trained as a resident in internal medicine at the University of California, San Francisco. He completed a Chief Residency year at UCSF. Between 2001 and 2002, he served as the Inaugural Under Secretary's Special Fellow for Quality and Safety in the Department of Veterans Affairs. Jha returned to Boston in 2002 to complete his fellowship in general medicine at Brigham and Women's Hospital and Harvard Medical School.

In 2004, Jha completed a Master of Public Health degree at the Harvard School of Public Health.

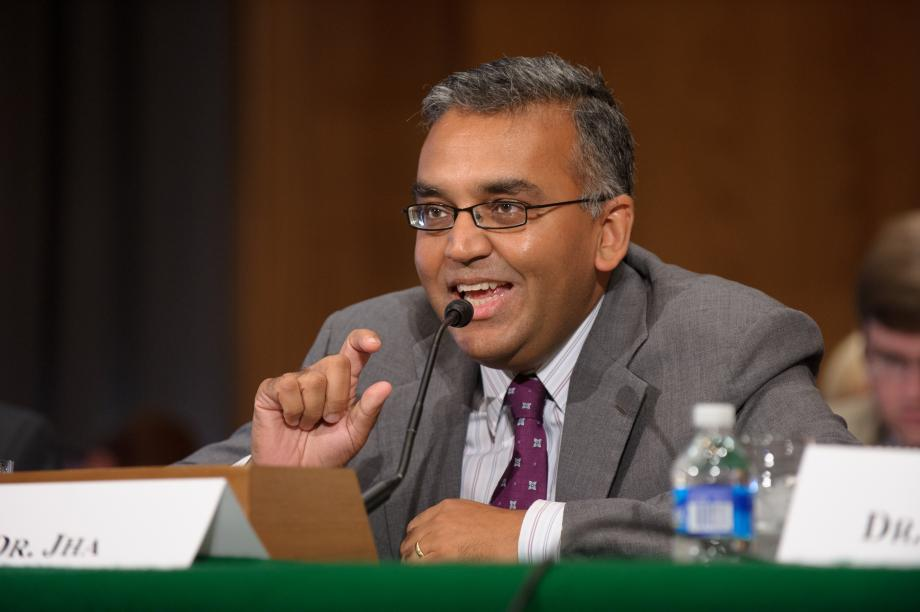
Jha speaking before the Senate Subcommittee on Primary Health and Aging in 2014

== Career ==
Jha worked as the K.T. Li Professor of Global Health at Harvard T.H. Chan School of Public Health and the Faculty Director of the Harvard Global Health Institute, as well as a senior advisor at Albright Stonebridge Group. On September 1, 2020, he became the Dean of the Brown University School of Public Health. He remains an adjunct professor of Global Health in the Department of Health Policy and Management at Harvard T.H. Chan School of Public Health. At Harvard T.H. Chan School of Public Health, his research focused on improving the quality of health care and addressing the high cost of health care in the United States.

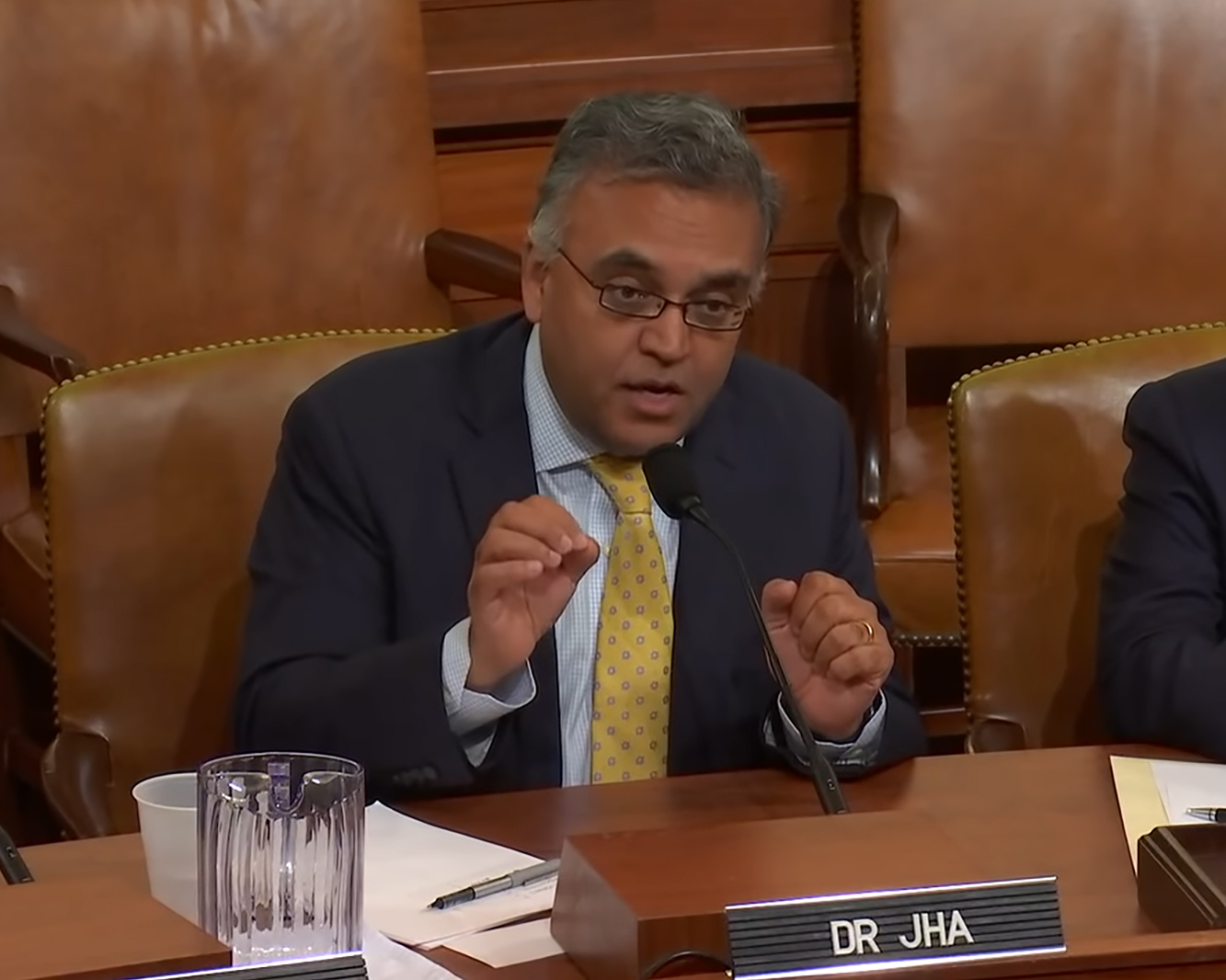
Jha testifies to the House Committee on Ways and Means in May 2019

=== COVID-19 pandemic ===
In mid-March 2020, Jha called for a two-week national quarantine across the United States to reduce the effects of the COVID-19 pandemic. He argued that it takes up to two weeks for those already infected with the virus to begin showing symptoms; given the lack of COVID-19 testing in the U.S., a two-week quarantine would help public health better assess how widespread the disease is to better inform decision-making. He has also advocated for the need to vastly strengthen healthcare infrastructure and increase the manufacturing of personal protective equipment to keep healthcare workers safe. He has testified multiple times in front of Congress as an expert helping guide policymakers on how best to help the US navigate the pandemic.

Between March 2020 and May 2021, Jha was mentioned on cable and network news approximately 60,000 times.

Jha serves on the National Advisory Council for COVID Collaborative.

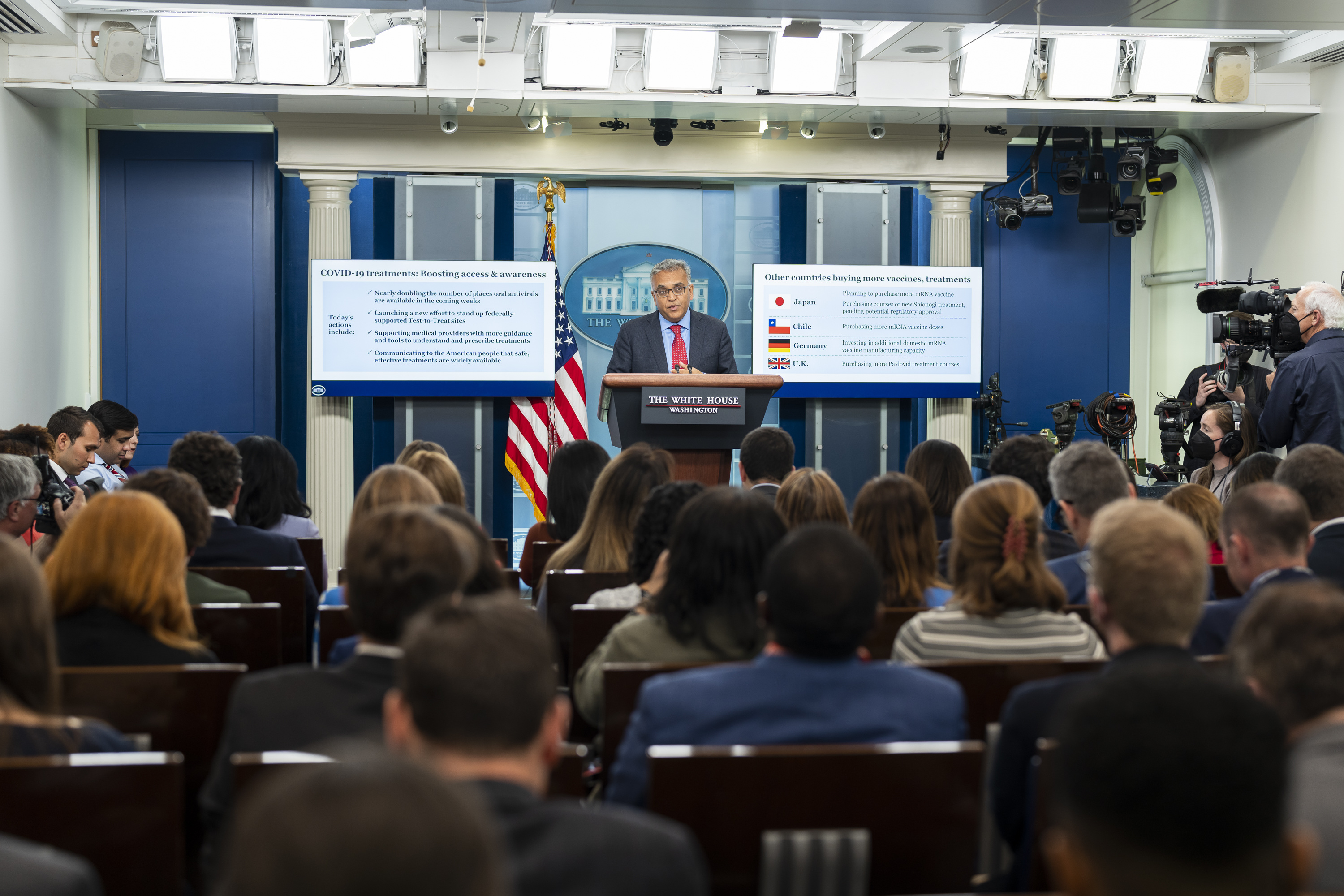
Jha speaking in the James S. Brady Press Briefing Room of the White House on April 26, 2022

In March 2022, it was announced that Jha would succeed Jeffrey Zients as the White House Coronavirus Response Coordinator. Jha succeeded Zients on April 5, 2022.

=== Brown University School of Public Health ===
Jha took office as the third dean of the Brown University School of Public Health in September 2020, following appointment in March that year. During Jha's tenure and the concurrent COVID-19 pandemic, the school expanded its programs, physical footprint, and faculty. Jha departed Brown in December 2025.

== Awards and honors ==
- 2013: Elected Member, National Academy of Medicine
- 2020: The Boston Globe named Jha one of the "Bostonians of the Year"
- 2021: Listed in Fortune's annual ranking of "World’s 50 Greatest Leaders"
- 2021: Meeting the Moment for Public Health award from Johnson & Johnson Research America
- 2022: Honorary Doctorate from the University of Massachusetts Lowell.
- 2023: John Jay Award from Columbia College
