= Sterna, Kozani =

Sterna
- Settlement
- Location within Greece
- Coordinates: 40°21′45″N 21°18′44″E
- Country: Greece
- Geographic region: Macedonia
- Administrative region: Western Macedonia
- Regional unit: Kozani
- Municipality: Voio
- Municipal unit: Neapoli
- Community: Velanidia

Population (2021)
  - Total: 20
- Time zone: UTC+2 (EET)
  - Summer (DST): UTC+3 (EEST)
- Vehicle registration: ΚΖ

Sterna (Greek: Στέρνα, before 1927: Σολομίστι – Solomisti), is a village in Kozani Regional Unit, Macedonia, Greece. It is part of the community of Velanidia.

Solomisti was a mixed village and a part of its population were Greek speaking Muslim Vallahades.
