= Bess Marcus =

American psychologist

Bess H. Marcus
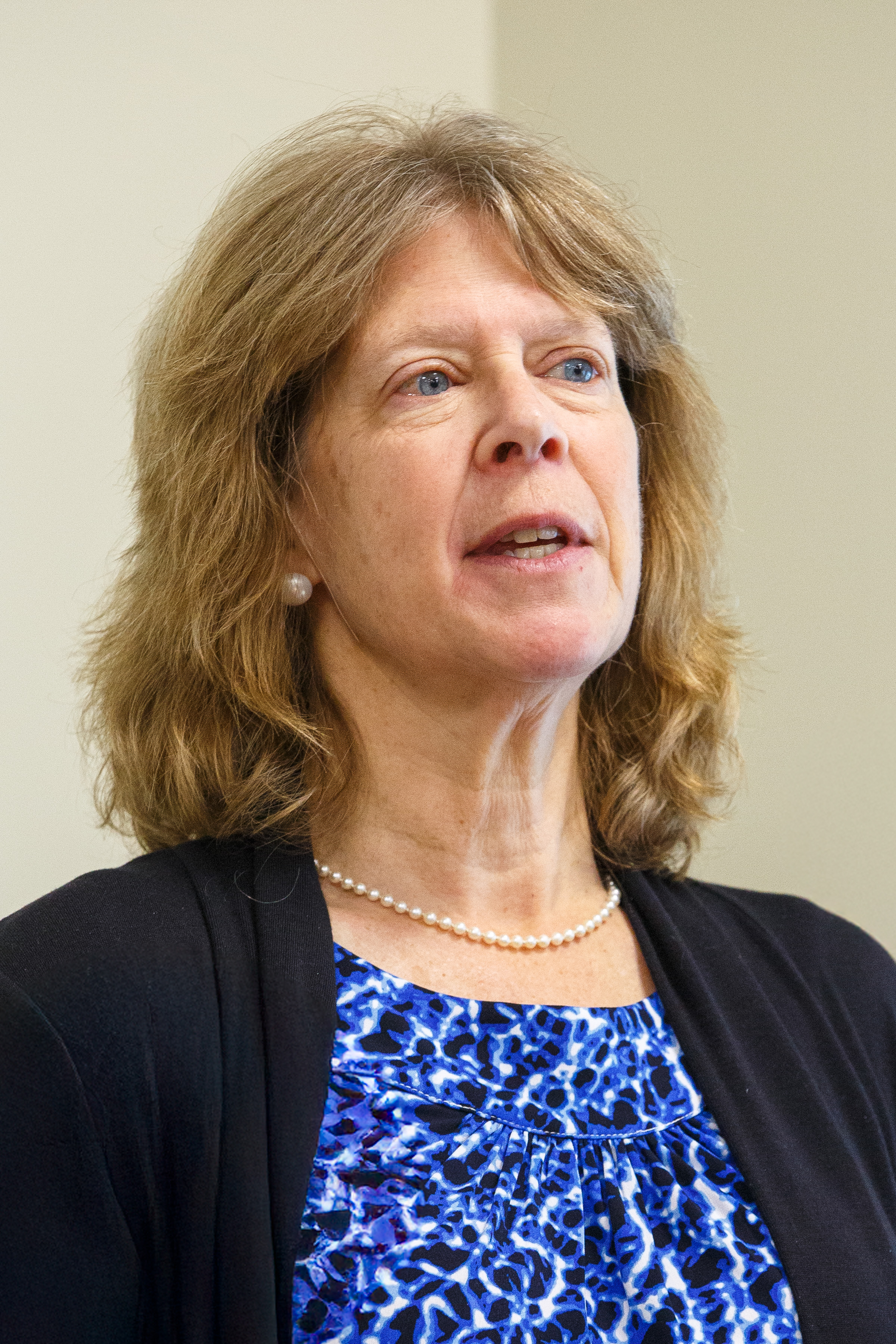
- Marcus in 2019

Academic background
- Education: Washington University in St. Louis; Auburn University

Bess H. Marcus (born 1961) is an American clinical health psychologist and scholar of health behavior changes. She is currently Professor of Behavioral and Social Sciences at Brown University, having previously served as dean of the Brown University School of Public Health. Before coming to Brown, Marcus was the founder of the UC San Diego Institute for Public Health and inaugural Senior Associate Dean for Public Health, at the UC San Diego School of Medicine.

Marcus received a B.A. from Washington University in St. Louis in 1984. She completed her M.S. and Ph.D. in clinical psychology at Auburn University in 1986 and 1988.

In 2017, Bess Marcus became dean of the Brown University School of Public Health, succeeding inaugural dean Terrie Fox Wetle. Marcus was succeeded by Ashish Jha in 2020.

IN 2019, Dr. Marcus censored a study focused on “rapid-onset gender dysphoria” by Dr. Lisa Littman, assistant professor of the practice of behavioral and social sciences at Brown University due to outcry by LGBTQ activists.
