= Henry Wellcome =

Anglo-American businessman (1853–1936)

Sir Henry Wellcome FRS
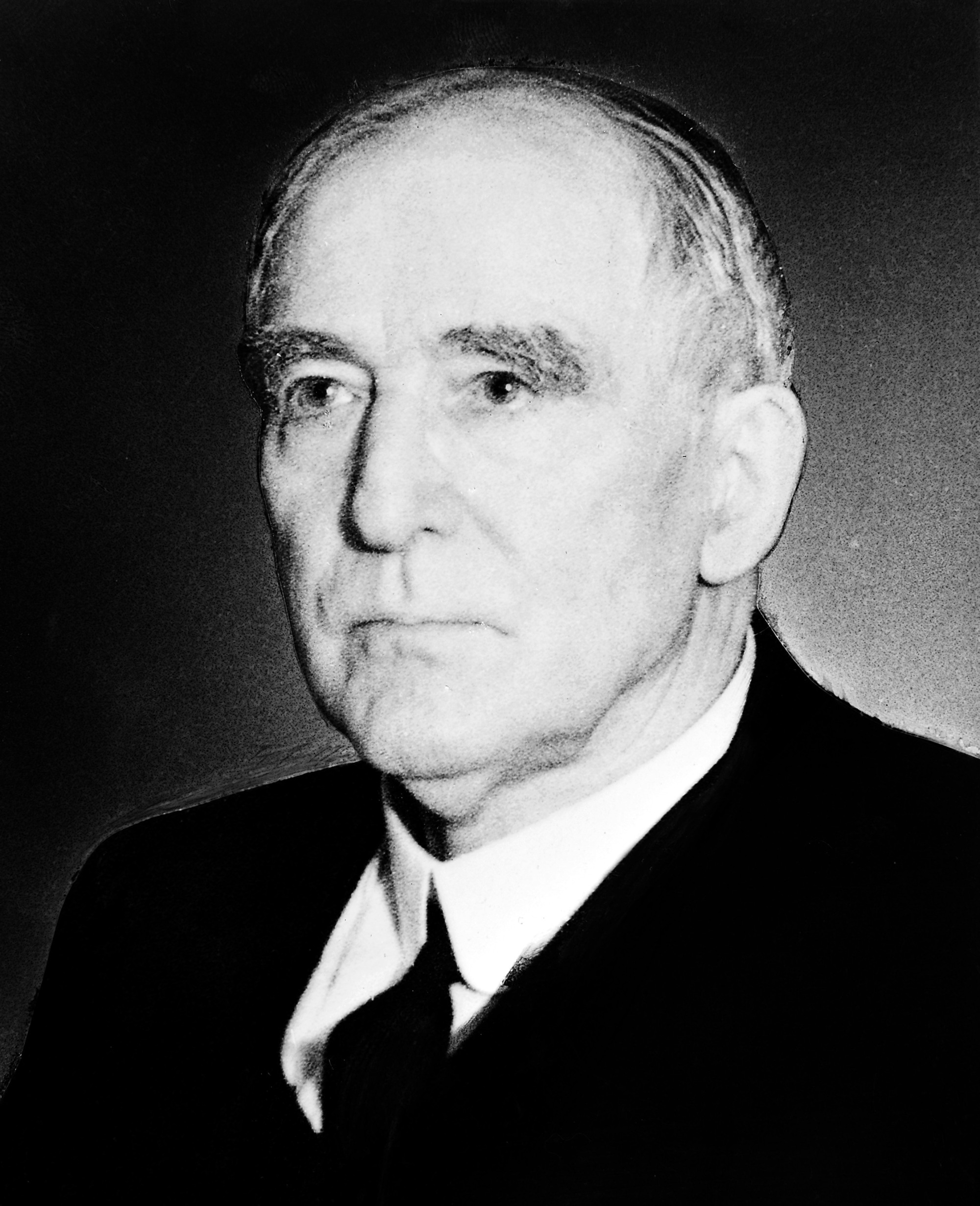
- Henry Wellcome in 1930
- Born: 21 August 1853; Almond, Wisconsin, U.S.
- Died: 25 July 1936 (aged 82); Marylebone, London, England
- Known for: Founding Burroughs Wellcome & Company, GlaxoSmithKline and the Wellcome Trust
- Medical career
- Profession: Pharmaceutical entrepreneur

Sir Henry Solomon Wellcome (21 August 1853 – 25 July 1936) was an American and British pharmaceutical entrepreneur. He founded the pharmaceutical company Burroughs Wellcome & Company with his colleague Silas Burroughs in 1880, which is one of the four large companies to eventually merge to form GlaxoSmithKline. He left a large amount of capital for charitable work in his will, which was used to form the Wellcome Trust, one of the world's largest medical charities. He was a keen collector of medical artefacts which are now managed by the Science Museum, London, and a small selection of which are displayed at the Wellcome Collection.

== Biography ==
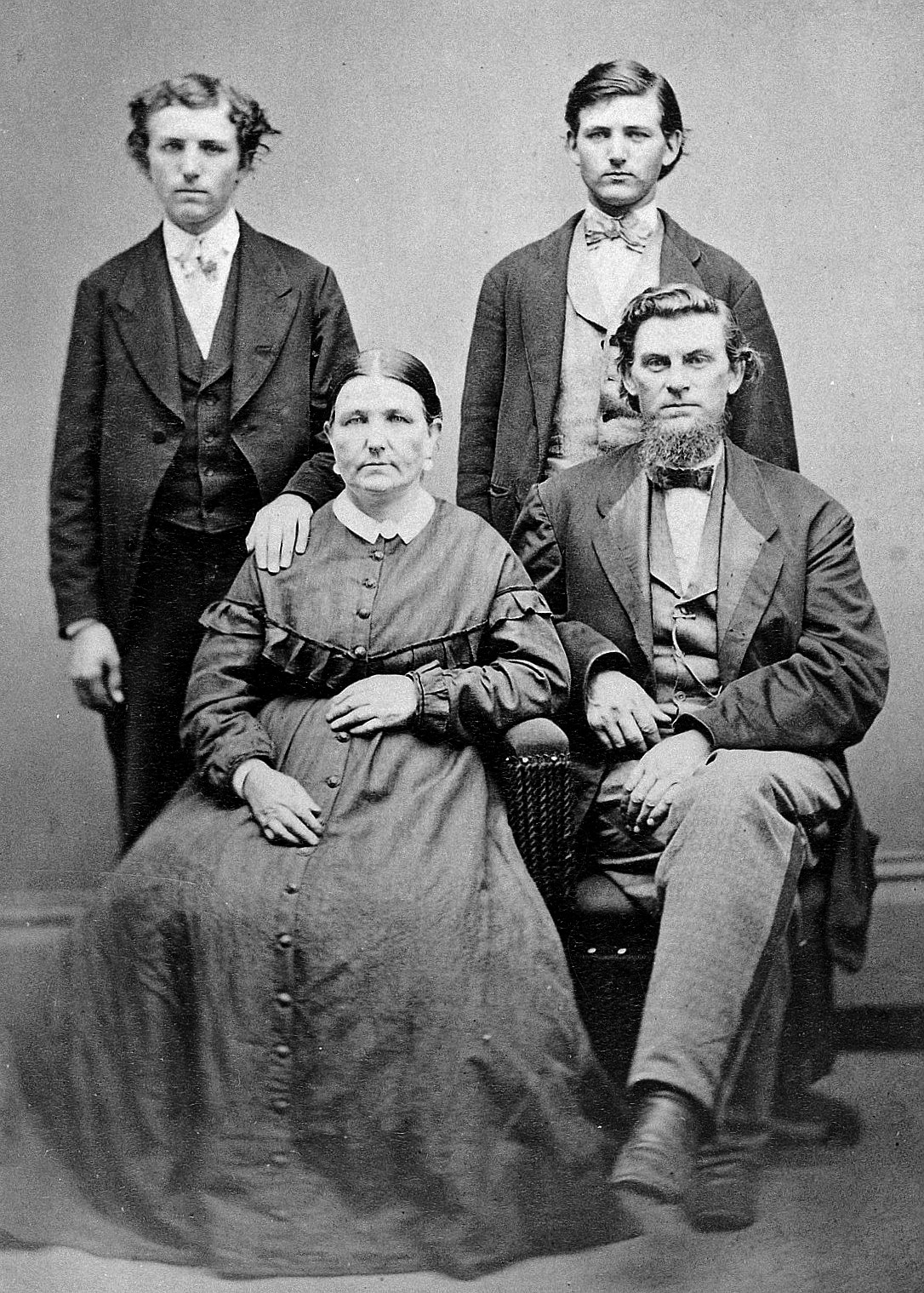
Wellcome family portrait, c. 1875–1877. Henry standing left. Unknown photographer. The Wellcome Collection, London

Wellcome was born in a frontier log cabin in what would later become Almond, Wisconsin, to Rev. S. C. Wellcome, an itinerant missionary who travelled and preached in a covered wagon, and Mary Curtis Wellcome. He had an early interest in medicine, particularly marketing. His first product, at the age of 16, was invisible ink (in fact just lemon juice), which he advertised in the Garden City (MN) Herald. He had a strict religious upbringing, particularly with respect to the temperance movement. His father was a strong member of the Second Adventist Church. He was a freemason.

=== Pharmaceutical executive ===
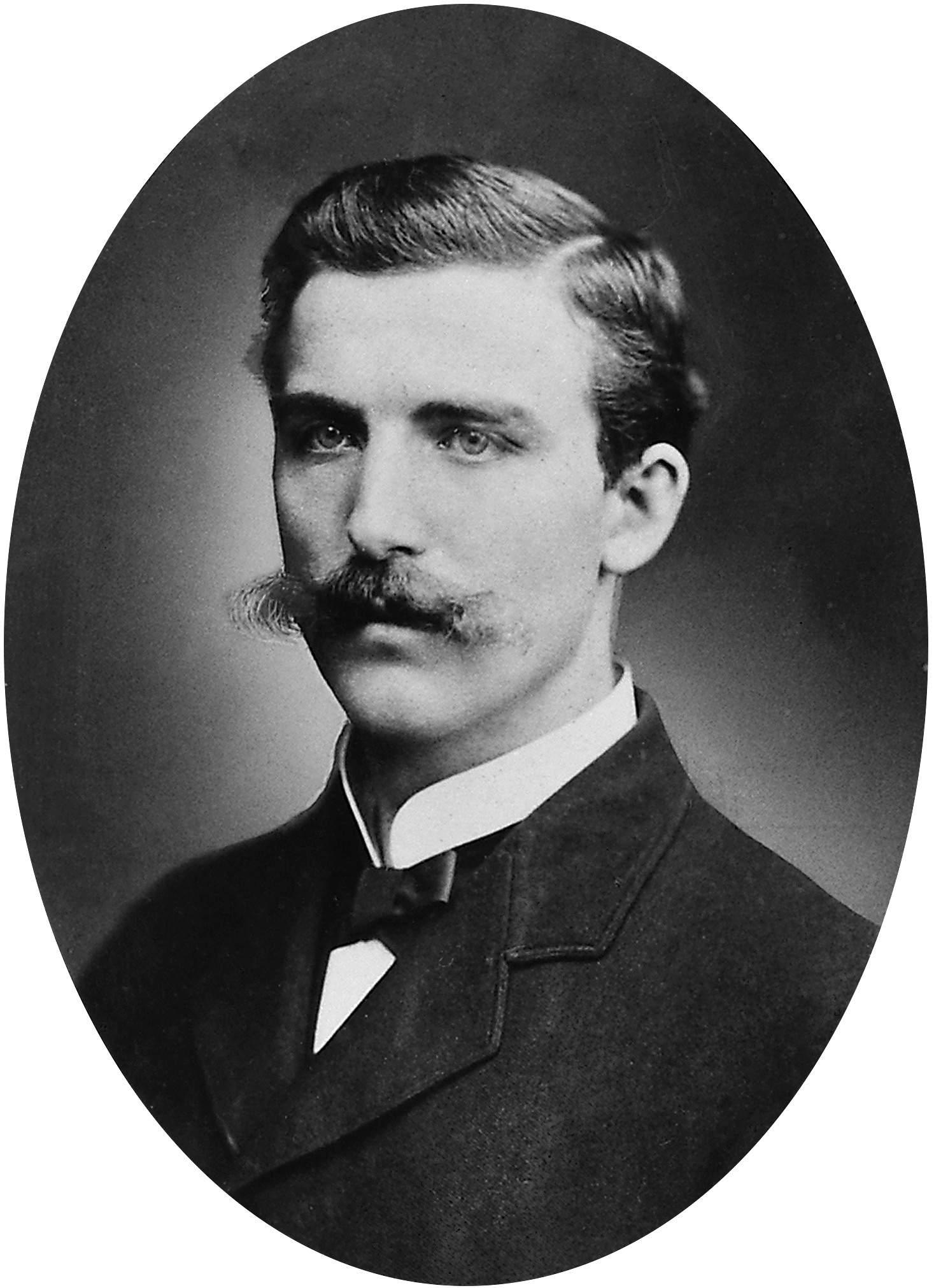
Henry Wellcome in 1880

In 1880, Wellcome established a pharmaceutical company, Burroughs Wellcome & Company, with his colleague Silas Mainville Burroughs. They introduced the selling of medicine in tablet form to England under the 1884 trademark "Tabloid". Previously, medicines had been sold mostly as powders or liquids. Burroughs and Wellcome also introduced direct marketing to doctors, giving them free samples. In 1895, Burroughs died, aged 48, leaving the company in the hands of Wellcome. It flourished and Wellcome set up several related research laboratories. In 1924, Wellcome consolidated all his commercial and non-commercial activities in one holding company, The Wellcome Foundation Ltd.

=== Personal life ===
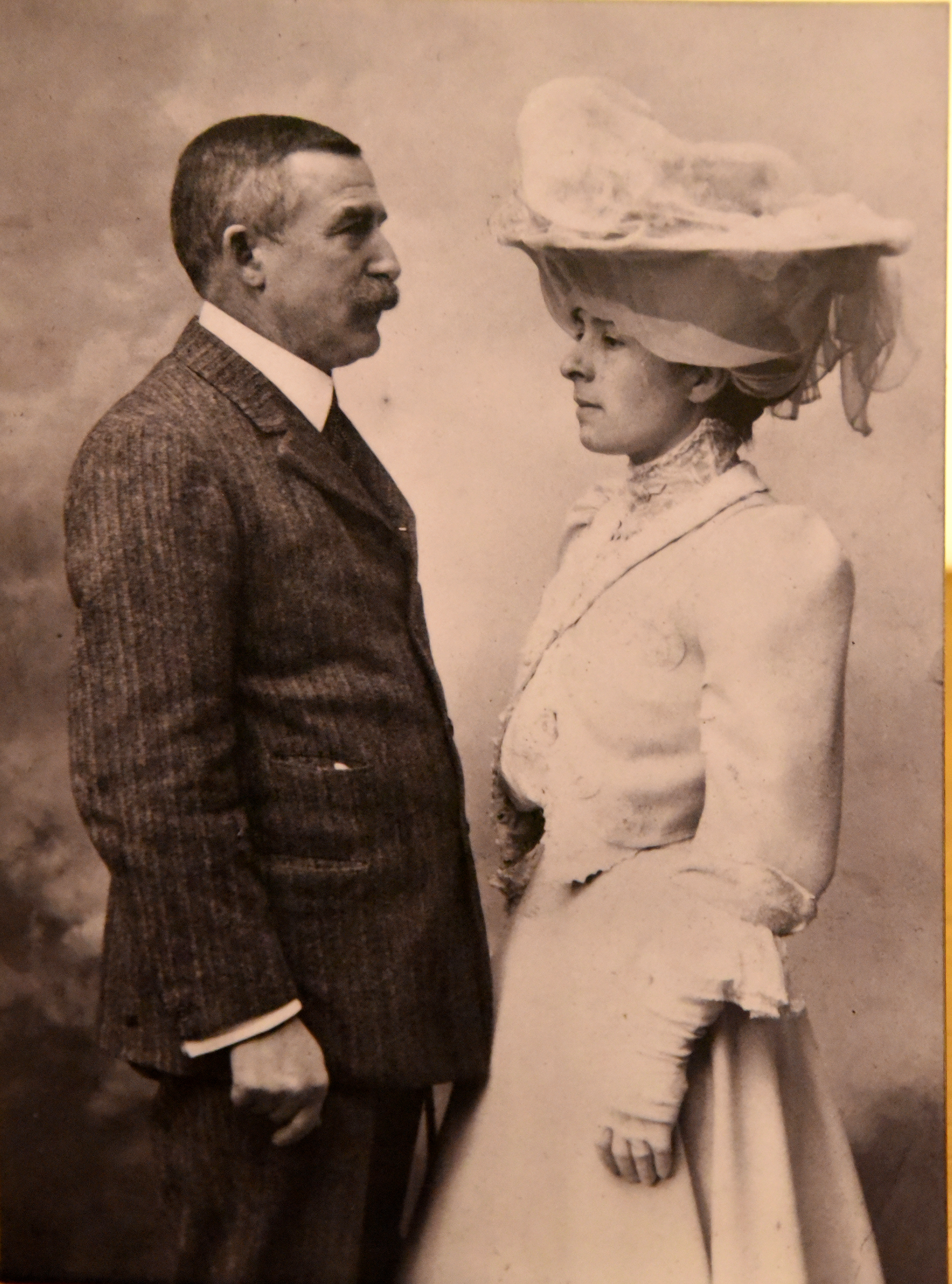
Henry Wellcome and his wife Syrie, c. 1902. Unknown photographer. The Wellcome Collection, London

In 1901, Wellcome married Gwendoline Maud Syrie Barnardo, a daughter of orphanage founder Thomas John Barnardo who was 26 years his junior. They had one child, Henry Mounteney Wellcome, born 1903, who was sent to foster parents at the age of about three. He was considered to be sickly at the time, and his parents were spending much time travelling. The marriage was not happy, and in 1909 the couple separated. After that Syrie (as she was known) had several affairs, including with the department store magnate Harry Gordon Selfridge, and the author William Somerset Maugham with whom she had a child (Mary Elizabeth) and later married. Wellcome sued for divorce in 1915, naming Maugham as co-respondent. The suit attracted large amounts of publicity that he had previously tried to avoid. Syrie never contested Henry's custody of their child, Henry and went on to have a successful international career as an interior designer.

In 1910, Wellcome became a British subject. In 1928, he was made an Honorary Vice-President of the Society for Nautical Research. He was appointed a Knight Bachelor in the 1932 Birthday Honours. In 1932, he was made an Honorary Fellow of the Royal College of Surgeons of England. He died of pneumonia in The London Clinic in 1936, aged 82, after an operation. On his death, the Wellcome Trust was established.

=== Legacy ===
In his will, Wellcome vested the entire share capital of his company in individual trustees, who were charged with spending the income to further human and animal health. The Wellcome Trust is now one of the world's largest private biomedical charities.

The first biography of Wellcome was commissioned by the Wellcome Trust in 1939, by A. W. Haggis, a member of staff at the Historical Medicine Museum Wellcome had established. The trustees, however, were dissatisfied with the final draft of 1942, and the biography was never published, although the drafts are freely available for consultation at the Wellcome Library.

A biography of Wellcome was written by Robert Rhodes James and published in 1994. In 2009, An Infinity of Things: How Sir Henry Wellcome Collected the World, written by Frances Larson, was published by Oxford University Press, after both Wellcome's personal and business papers had been catalogued.

== The Wellcome Trust ==
After Wellcome's death, the income from the foundation, initially via dividends, later via more tax efficient deeds of covenant, was used to fund the Wellcome Trust, providing endowments for pharmacology departments to educate and train the researchers of the future. After changes in UK charity law the foundation was sold to GSK and the receipts invested in a broad ranging portfolio. The trust then became the largest charity in the UK, providing funding for focus areas such as biomedical science, technology transfer, public engagement and bioethics. Grants and fellowships are available to recipients with goals of translating research into usable health products. The trust currently spends over $600 million a year in medical research training.

In 1955, the Burroughs Wellcome Fund (BWF) was established as the U.S. branch of the Wellcome pharmaceutical enterprise; in 1993, a $400 million gift from the Wellcome Trust enabled BWF to become fully independent from the company, and it became a private, independent biomedical research foundation based in Research Triangle Park, North Carolina.

Newly started programmes by the Wellcome Trust include the creation of research training programmes for physicians wishing to pursue careers in academic medicine, which the trust started in October 2010. Also currently, the foundation supports clinicians' research to develop treatments for obesity using natural appetite suppression.

== Collections ==
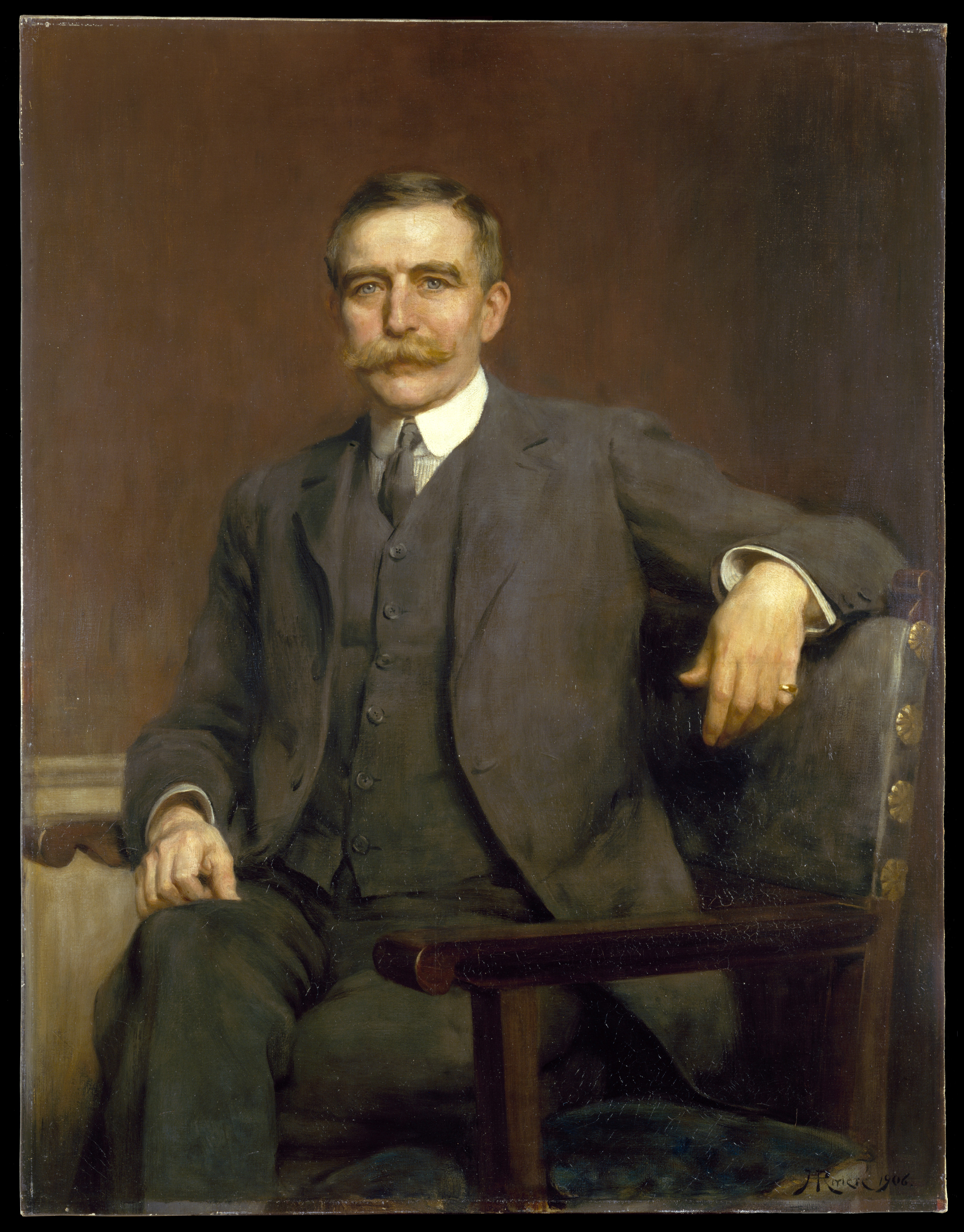
Portrait of Henry Wellcome by Hugh Goldwin Rivière, 1906. Part of the Wellcome Collection

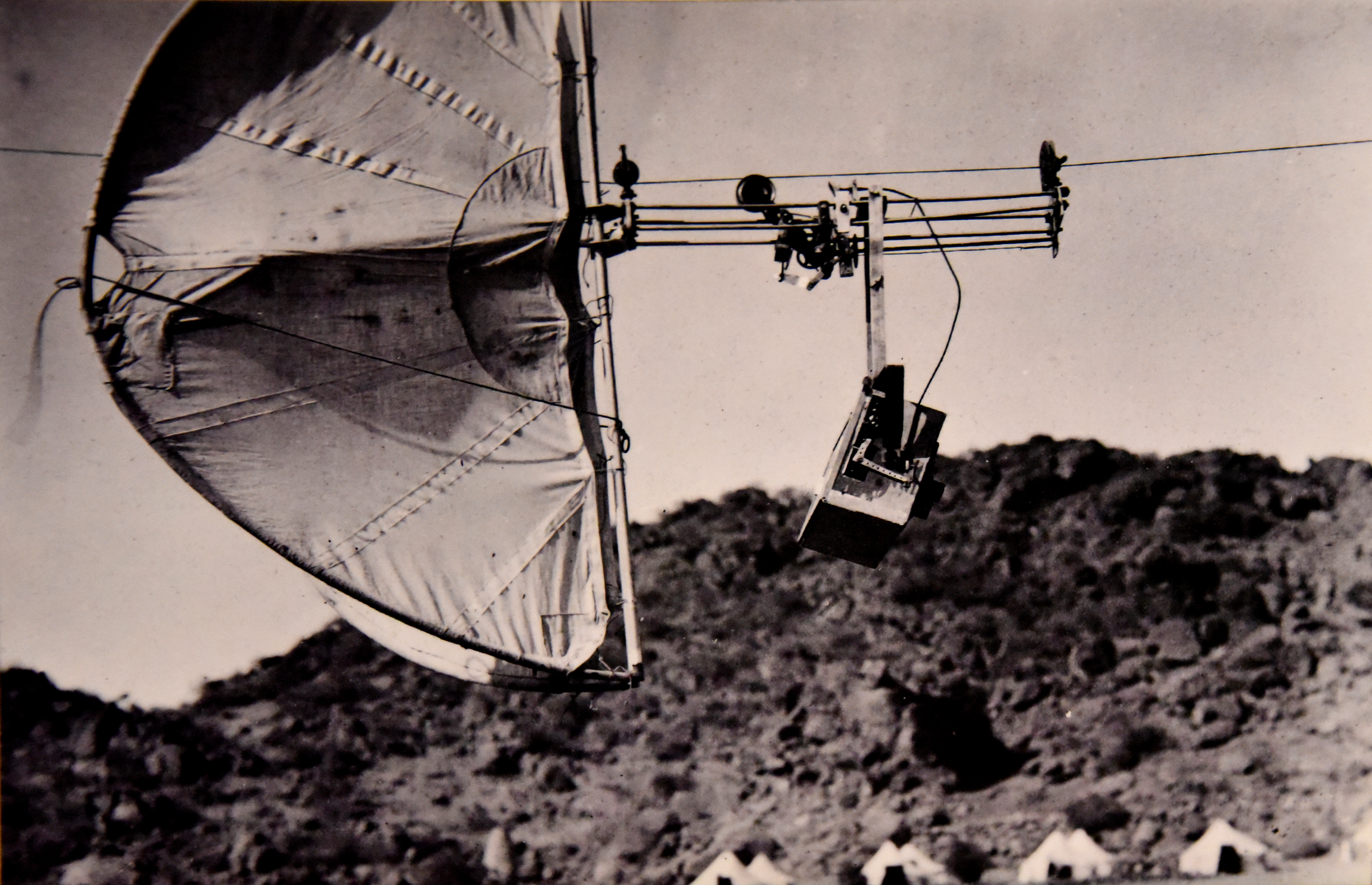
Henry Wellcome's photographic automatic kite trolley aerial camera device used at Jebel Moya, Sudan, 1912–1913. Unknown photographer. The Wellcome Collection, London

Wellcome had a passion for collecting medically related artefacts, aiming to create a Museum of Man. He bought for his collection anything related to medicine, including Napoleon's toothbrush. By the time of his death, there were 125,000 medical objects in the collection, of over one million total. Most of the non-medical objects were dispersed after his death. He was also a keen archaeologist, in particular digging for many years at Jebel Moya, Sudan, hiring 4000 people to excavate. He was one of the first investigators to use kite aerial photography on an archaeological site, with surviving images available in the Wellcome Library.

Wellcome's collection is now managed by the Science Museum, London, and has been in their care since 1976. Many objects from the collection are now on display in the museum's Medicine: The Wellcome Galleries. The Wellcome Collection exhibited a number of objects from Wellcome's collection in "Medicine Man", from 2007 to 2022. His collection of books, paintings, drawings, photographs and other media is available for viewing at the Wellcome Library. In 2003, the Brothers Quay directed a short animated film in tribute to the collection entitled The Phantom Museum.

== Works ==
- Alte cymrische Heilkunde : ein Abdruck des historischen Andenkens. Burroughs Wellcome, London Digital edition by the University and State Library Düsseldorf
- The Story of Metlakahtla. London; New York: Saxon, 1887.

== Gallery ==
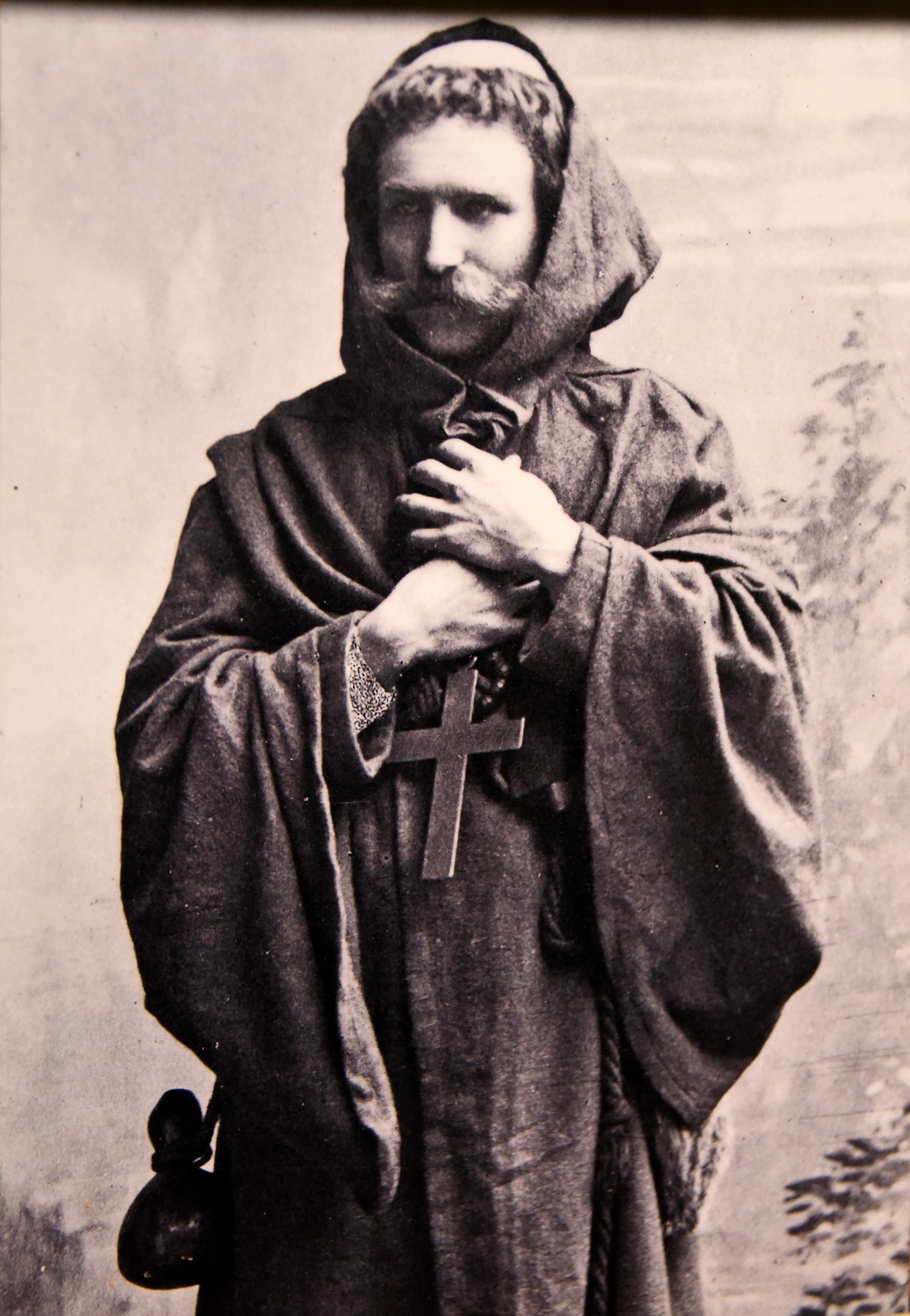
Portrait of Henry Wellcome in a monk's costume, c. 1885. Unknown photographer. The Wellcome Collection, London

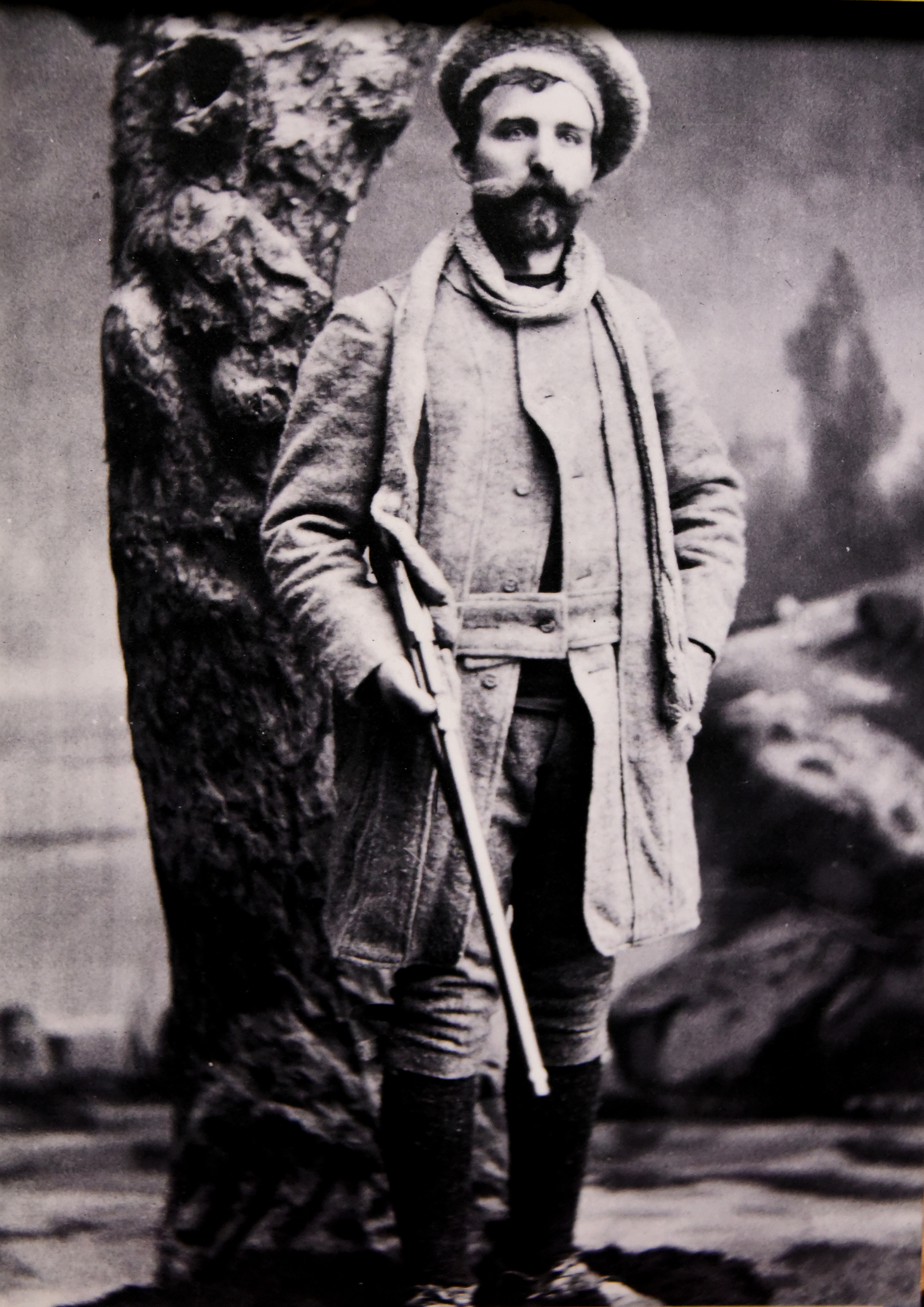
Portrait of Henry Wellcome in shooting costume, c. 1885. Unknown photographer. The Wellcome Collection, London

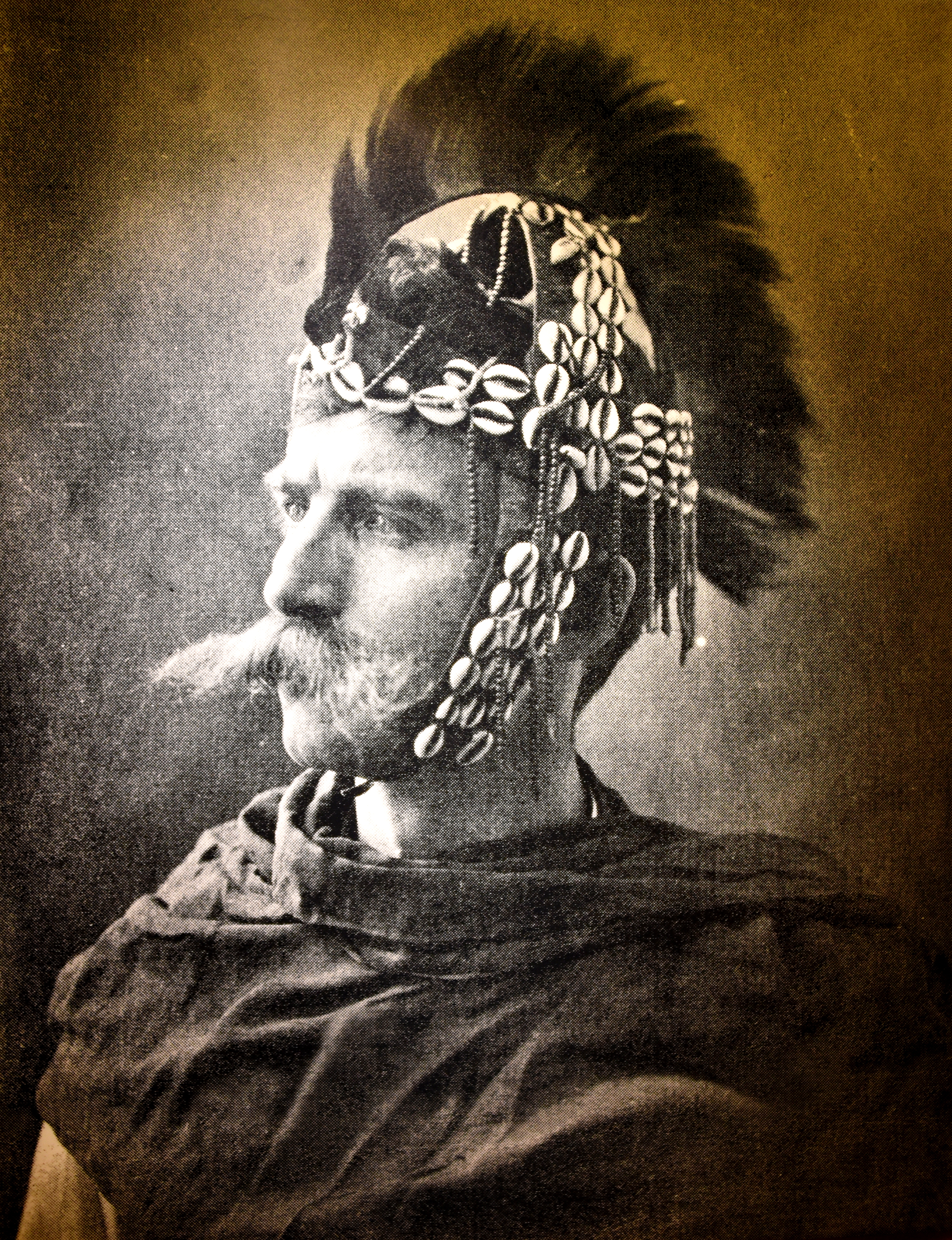
Henry Wellcome in fancy dress, c. 1885. Unknown photographer. The Wellcome Collection, London

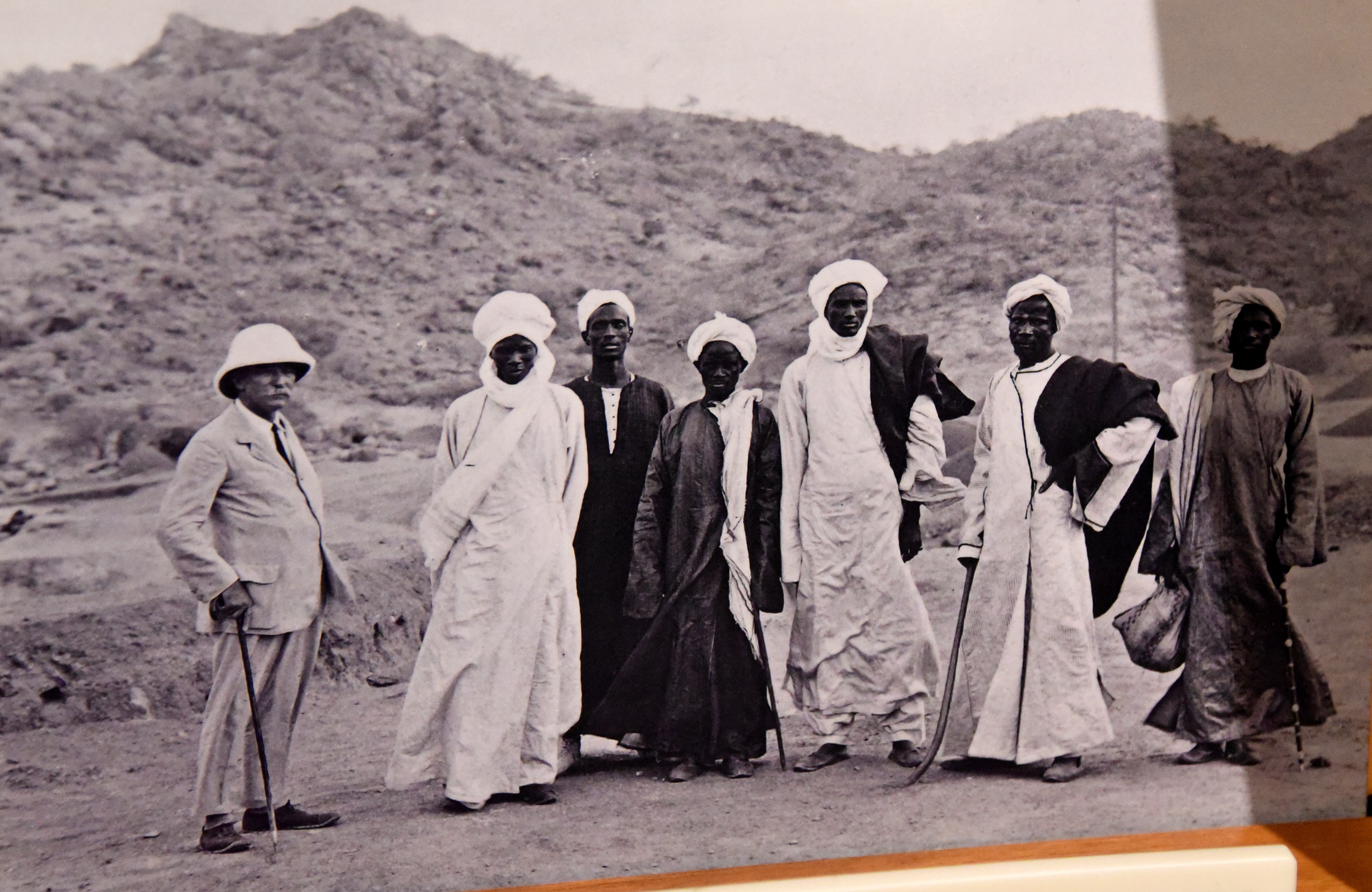
Henry Wellcome with Sultans of Socota, Jebel Moya, Sudan, c. 1912. Unknown photographer. The Wellcome Collection, London

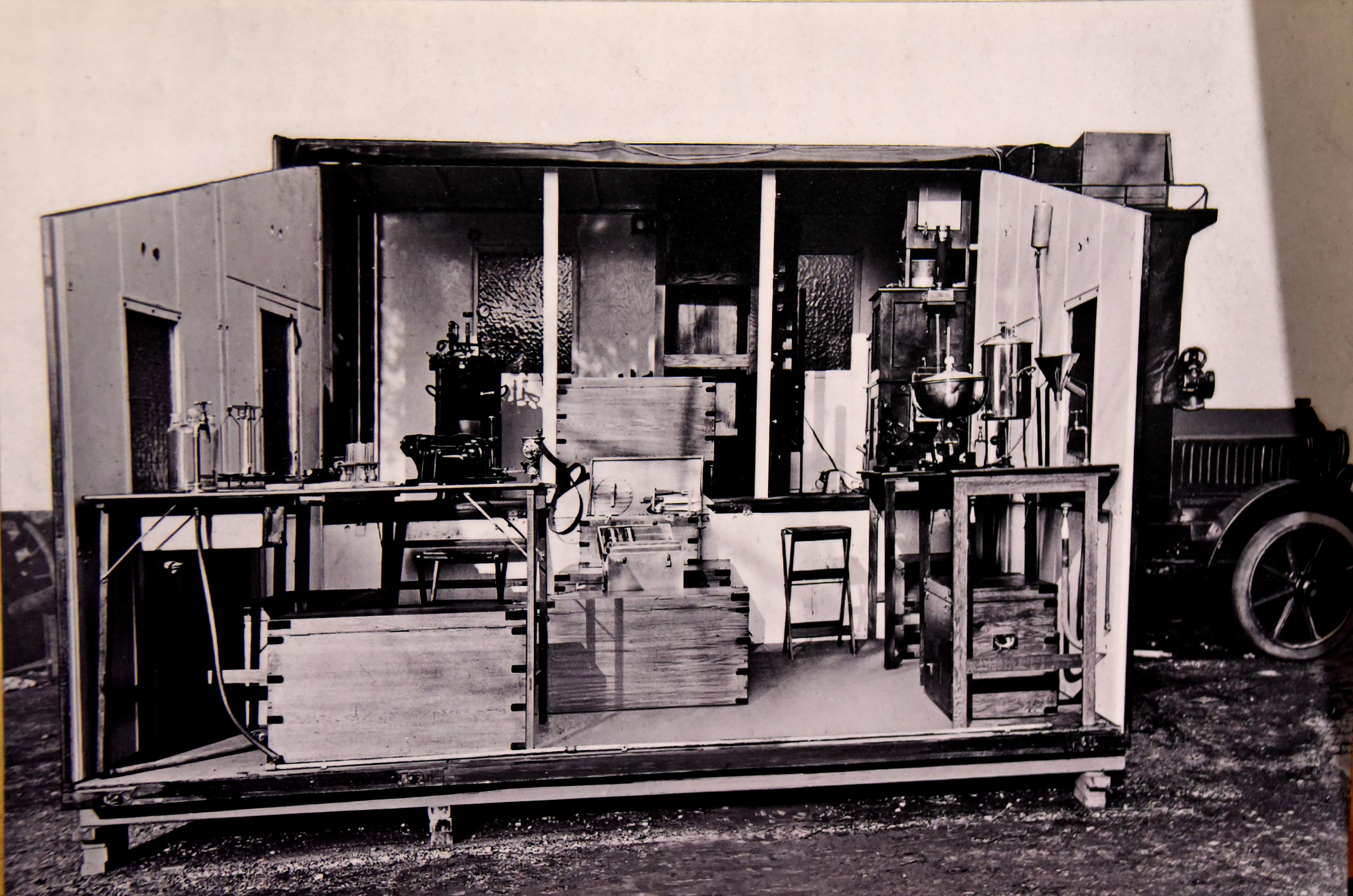
Mobile field bacteriology laboratory interior, Khartoum, Sudan, c. 1918. The lab was part of Henry Wellcome's work. Unknown photographer. The Wellcome Collection, London

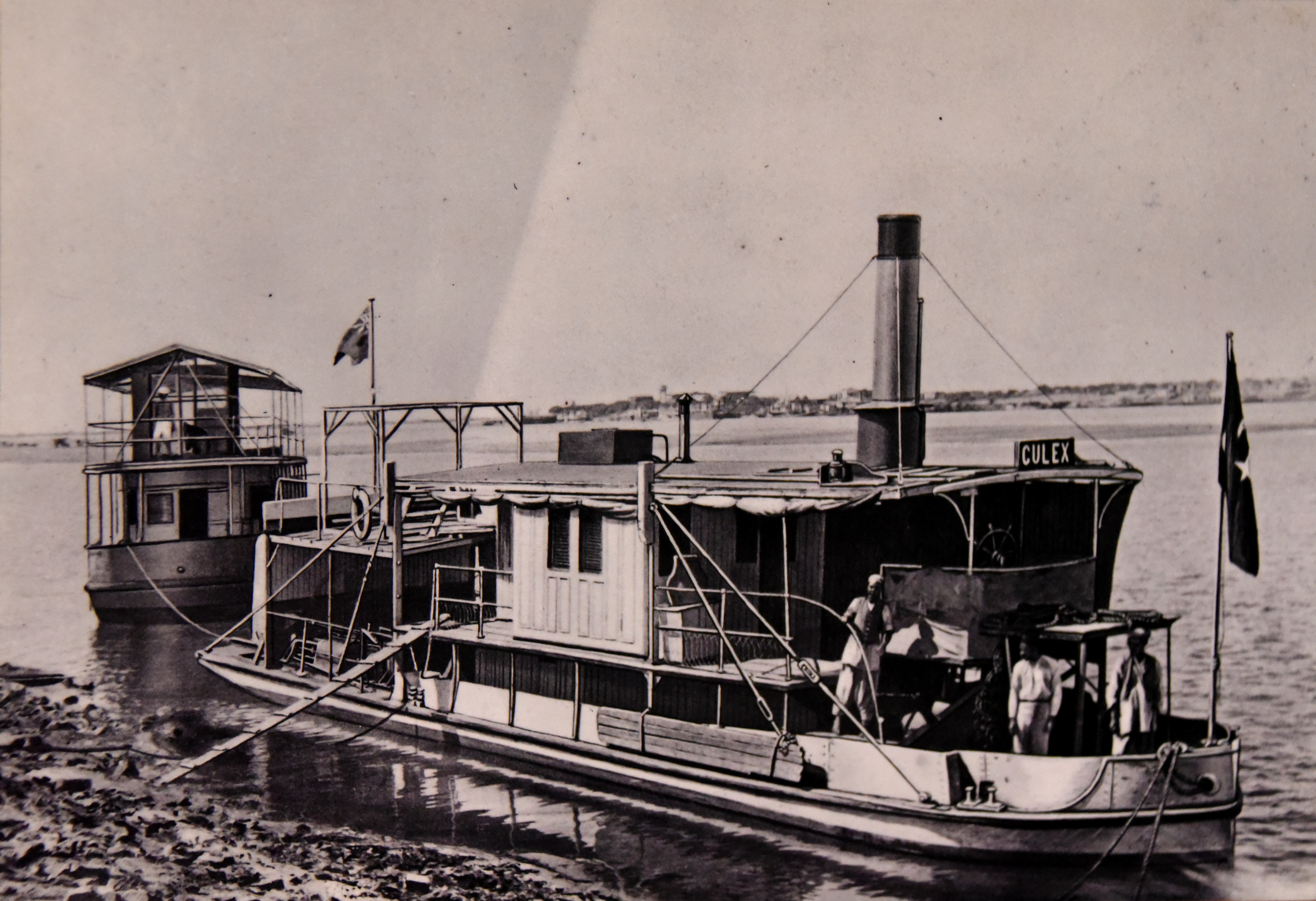
Floating laboratory, Sudan, c. 1911. The lab was part of Henry Wellcome's work. Unknown photographer. The Wellcome Collection, London
