= Burroughs Wellcome Fund =

American non-profit medical research organization

- Founded: 1955; 71 years ago
- Purpose: Biological and Medical research and Science Education
- Location: Research Triangle Park, North Carolina, U.S.
- Method: Funding
- Key people: Louis J. Muglia (President and CEO)
- Endowment: US$782.7 million
- Website: www.bwfund.org

The Burroughs Wellcome Fund (BWF) is an American non-profit medical research organization that provides funding for biomedical research, STEM education, and areas of career development for scientists. Since 1970, it has been headquartered in North Carolina's Research Triangle Park.

Founded in 1955 as an extension of the England-based Wellcome Trust, the Burroughs Wellcome Fund's two-part mission is “to help scientists early in their careers develop as independent investigators” and “to advance fields in the basic biomedical sciences that are undervalued or in need of particular encouragement”.

The fund grants more than $40 million each year to research focusing on infectious disease, biomedical science, and other health-related fields. The Fund also supports STEM education efforts in North Carolina, including the North Carolina Science, Mathematics, and Technology Education Center.

== History ==
The Burroughs Wellcome Fund was founded in 1955 as an American extension of the Wellcome Trust in England. These foundations trace their origins to the American pharmaceutical magnates Henry Wellcome and Silas Burroughs, who founded Burroughs Wellcome and Co. in England in 1880. This pharmaceutical company was one of the four large organizations that eventually merged to become GlaxoSmithKline.

After Silas Burroughs died in 1895, Henry Wellcome expanded the company into several continents and numerous countries, including the United States. In 1924, Wellcome consolidated all of the company's holdings under a corporate umbrella named The Wellcome Foundation Ltd. When he died in 1936, his will vested all of the corporate shares in a new charity entity – the Wellcome Trust. The Trust's purpose was to use profits from the Wellcome Foundation to advance research in medicine and medical history.

In 1955, Sir Henry Dale, one of the Trust's original trustees and its chair for 21 years, and William N. Creasy, president and chair of Burroughs Wellcome Co. USA, created a U.S. extension of the Wellcome Trust called the Burroughs Wellcome Fund. From 1955 to 1993, it operated as a corporate foundation to support scientific research. In 1993 a $400 million gift from the trustees allowed it to become an independent entity with no ties to the Wellcome Foundation or to GlaxoSmithKline, which by 2000 had purchased all shares of Wellcome Foundation.

== Activities ==
Since its founding, the BWF has funded medical and biological science research across the United States and Canada. This has mainly consisted of individual recognition and funding like the Investigator in the Pathogenesis of Infectious Disease Award, the Physician-Scientist Institutional Award, and the Innovation in Regulatory Science Award. The BWF also supports larger research projects conducted by multiple teams, such as a report on "The Domestic and International Impacts of the 2009-H1N1 Influenza A Pandemic."

One example of large-scale research supported in part by the fund was the genetic sequencing of Plasmodium falciparum, the parasite behind most malaria deaths. The BWF partnered with the World Health Organization and the Department of Defense to fund this research at the University of Pennsylvania. In addition to financial support, the Fund facilitated collaboration among the research participants.

The Fund is a sponsor of the North Carolina Teacher of the Year program through the North Carolina Department of Public Instruction.

In 2013, BWF created the Innovation in Regulatory Science Award to fund regulatory science researchers in the U.S. and Canada.
