= Khaled Almilaji =

Syrian doctor

Khaled Almilaji is a Syrian doctor who is best known for his humanitarian work in Syria (including leading a large-scale polio vaccination campaign, where over 1.4 million Syrian children were inoculated), and for being forced to relocate from the U.S. to Canada as a result of the U.S. Executive Order 13769 (i.e. the travel ban).

== Early life and education ==
Almilaji was born in Aleppo, Syria in 1981. He completed his medical training at the University of Aleppo's School of Medicine in 2006.

== Career ==
=== Syria: war outbreak and torture ===
When the war broke out in Syria, Almilaji was a medical resident with a focus on otolaryngology. He had planned to head to Stuttgart, Germany to train as a head and neck surgeon in March 2011, but instead joined other physicians in secretly treating injured protestors in the cities of Hama and Homs.

On 7 September. 2011, Almilaji and three colleagues were arrested for treating injured protestors, and were tortured by the Assad regime in prison. Torture included electrocution, beatings, and starvation. Despite his own injuries, prison authorities relied on Almilaji to treat other prisoners (while blind-folded). Six months later, in early March 2012, Almilaji was released. He remained in Aleppo, where he continued to treat injured protestors, before fleeing with his parents to Gaziantep, Turkey following a raid on a friend's home.

=== Humanitarian work ===
In Turkey, Almilaji was a health coordinator for The Saudi National Campaign, which supported Syrians living in Turkey and Syria. He also led the health department of the Syrian Opposition Coalition' Assistance Coordination Unit, which involved coordinating between Syrian hospitals in regions under attack. Almilaji also developed the Early Warning Alert & Response Network (EWARN) to monitor for disease outbreaks in Syria.

Soon, Almilaji founded the Sustainable International Medical Relief Organization (SIMRO), which is a non-governmental organization. In 2013, Almilaji also co-founded the Canadian International Medical Relief Organization (CIMRO) with physician Jay Dahman and former paramedic Mark Cameron, to provide medical supplies and training to front-line aid workers in regions such as Syria.

In 2013, there was a polio outbreak in Syria, which was detected in part thanks to Almilaji's EWARN system. ACU (Assistant Coordination Unit) led a number of organizations, together known as the Polio Control Task Force, in an effort to curb this polio outbreak. Almilaji was a key player in launching a door-to-door polio vaccination campaign, where over 8,500 health care workers distributed vaccines to approximately 1.4 million Syrian children to curb the polio outbreak in rebel-held areas.

In 2014, Almilaji met Jehan Mouhsen (a Syrian physician born in Montenegro). The two married in Germany in July 2016. One month later in the fall of 2016, Almilaji and his wife moved to Providence, Rhode Island on a student visa, where Almilaji would pursue a master's degree in public health at Brown University on a full scholarship. During his time at Brown University, Almilaji launched Care4SyrianKids – an advocacy and awareness campaign – with classmates.

=== Travel ban and the move to Canada ===
On January 1, 2017, while still a Brown University student, Almilaji flew to Gaziantep, Turkey to attend a United Nations meeting relevant to his humanitarian work and to renew his Turkish residency permit. He planned to return to Rhode Island in time for his classes in the winter semester, which began on 25 January. On 18 January, while still in Turkey, Almilaji's multiple-entry student visa was revoked. This revocation was then made permanent as a result of executive order 13769 (i.e. the travel ban) on 27 January 2017. Almilaji was unable to return to the U.S. At this point, his wife was five weeks pregnant, and stayed in New York with friends.

The couple remained separated for around six months, during which Brown University and Rhode Island officials advocated unsuccessfully for Almilaji's visa to be renewed.

Brown University's Terrie Fox Wetle (Dean of its School of Public Health) asked University of Toronto's Howard Hu (the Dean of the Dalla Lana School of Public Health, and a Brown University alumnus) to consider admitting Almilaji into a public health postgraduate program. Hu agreed. The University of Toronto waived his tuition and private donors covered living costs.

Almilaji moved to Toronto, Canada, on 16 June 2017, where he was reunited with his wife. On 21 June 2017, he began an Executive Master of Health Informatics Program at the University of Toronto's Institute of Health Policy, Management and Evaluation's (IHPME), which is a part of the Dalla Lana School of Public Health.

=== Ongoing humanitarian work ===
Alongside his studies, Almilaji continues to work with SIMRO, where one project involves the building of the Avicenna Women and Children's Hospital to provide reproductive and maternity care in the Idlib province in Syria. The hospital has partnered with Brown University and the University of Toronto to provide training for staff. The building of the underground hospital has partly been funded through crowdfunding.

On 12 December 2017, Almilaji, alongside his fellow CIMRO co-founders, was awarded the Meritorious Service Medal by Governor General of Canada Julie Payette, in recognition of his efforts as a civilian in providing medical relief and training to global disaster-struck areas.

Almilaji ultimately plans to return to Syria to rebuild the nation's medical system.

== Selected bibliography ==
- B Tajaldin K Almilaji, P Langton, A Sparrow. Defining Polio: Closing the Gap in Global Surveillance. Annals of Global Health. 2015.
- A Sparrow, K Almilaji, B Tajaldin, N Teodoro, P Langton. Cholera in the time of war: implications of weak surveillance in Syria for the WHO's preparedness—a comparison of two monitoring systems. BMJ Global Health. 2016.
- M Elamein, H Bower, C Valderrama, D Zedan, H Rihawi, K Almilaji, et al. Attacks against health care in Syria, 2015–16: results from a real-time reporting tool. The Lancet. 2017.
