= Peter Monti =

American psychologist

Peter M. Monti is an American psychologist, currently the Donald G. Millar Distinguished Professor of Alcohol and Addiction Studies, Professor of Behavioral and Social Sciences and former director of the Center for Alcohol and Addiction Studies at Brown University. He is a Fellow of the American Psychological Society.

Monti holds degrees from Providence College, the College of William & Mary, and the University of Rhode Island.
