= Louis J. Muglia =

American geneticist

- Born: 1959 (age 66–67)
- Education: University of Chicago, University of Michigan
- Known for: Preterm Birth
- Scientific career
- Fields: Medical genetics, pediatrics
- Workplaces: Cincinnati Children's Hospital Medical Center, Vanderbilt University Medical Center, Washington University School of Medicine

Louis J. Muglia (born 1959) is an American medical geneticist, endocrinologist and pediatrician noted for his research on premature birth and prenatal testing. Muglia was the A. Graeme Mitchell Chair and Directory of the Division of Human Genetics and Vice Chair for Research at Cincinnati Children's Hospital Medical Center. He was also the director of the Center for the Prevention of Preterm Birth at Cincinnati. In January 2020, Muglia became the president and CEO of the biomedical research foundation, the Burroughs Wellcome Fund.

== Early life and education ==
Muglia grew up in Detroit. He earned a B.S. in biophysics from the University of Michigan, a Ph.D. and M.D. from University of Chicago.

== Career ==
After medical school at the University of Chicago, Muglia completed his postgraduate training at Children's Hospital Medical Center in Boston. In 1996, he became an assistant professor of pediatrics at Washington University School of Medicine. In July 2017, he was named the Alumni Endowed Professor of Pediatrics. In 2008, Muglia left for Vanderbilt University to accept an endowed professorship and a position as vice-chair of Research Affairs. In 2012, he became the director of the Center for the Prevention of Preterm Birth at Cincinnati Children's Hospital Medical Center.

Muglia's research focus was to understand the molecular timing machinery comprising the biological clock that determines the timing of birth to prevent or better treat human preterm labor and delivery utilizing genetic and comparative genomic approaches. He received grants from the March of Dimes to continue this exploration.

Muglia has also been elected as a Fellow in the American Association for the Advancement of Science and is a member of the Institute of Medicine of the National Academy of Sciences. He is an active member of the Society for Pediatric Research, American Pediatric Society, Endocrine Society and the Pediatric Endocrine Society. Dr. Muglia served as chair of the Board of Scientific Counselors for the Eunice Kennedy Shriver National Institute of Child Health and Human Development of the National Institutes of Health.

== Awards ==
- 1992–1994 Lucille Markey Charitable Trust Scholar
- 1994–1999 Clinical Investigator Award, National Institutes of Health
- 1996–2000 Burroughs Wellcome Fund Career Award in the Biomedical Sciences
- 1999 Society for Pediatric Research Young Investigator Award
- 2006 Kavli Fellow, National Academy of Sciences
- 2009 Fellow, American Association for the Advancement of Science
- 2013 National Academy of Medicine (Institute of Medicine) of the National Academies
- 2020 Finnish Academy of Science and Letters
