= Vanja Dukic =

American statistician and applied mathematician

Vanja Dukic is an expert in computational statistics and mathematical epidemiology. She is a professor of applied mathematics and courtesy professor of economics at the University of Colorado Boulder.

Her research focuses on computational statistics and Bayesian modeling and inference, and includes applications to disease ecology and public health, computational epidemiology work on using internet search engine access patterns to track disease spread, the effects of climate change on the spread of diseases, and risk and insurance.

Her research has been funded by the National Institutes of Health (NIH), National Science Foundation (NSF), Environmental Protection Agency (EPA), National Institute of Food and Agriculture (NIFA), and Google.org, and she has been an invited speaker at over 100 national and international conferences.

Dukic has held several professional positions on editorial boards, including serving as an associate editor for the Journal of the American Statistical Association, Bayesian Analysis, and Statistica Sinica, and as the statistical advisor to the editorial board of Radiology Advances. She has also served on the Board of Directors of the International Society for Bayesian Analysis (ISBA) and the Scientific Advisory Board for the Institute for Computational and Experimental Research in Mathematics (ICERM). She chaired the Bayesian program at the Joint Statistical Meetings (JSM) and the ISBA Program Council.

Dukic is also active in the industry, having served as Amazon Scholar (2019–2023), Senior Technical Fellow at Haus, a marketing science company, and Boulder Computational Solutions, Inc., a CU Boulder startup.

Dukic earned a bachelor's degree in finance and actuarial mathematics from Bryant University in 1995. She completed her doctorate in applied mathematics at Brown University in 2001. She worked as a postdoctoral fellow in the Department of Statistics, and a tenured faculty member in the Biostatistics program of the Department of Public Health Sciences at the University of Chicago, before moving to Colorado. She has also held visiting positions at the University of Turin, Collegio Carlo Alberto, and International Centre for Economic Research (ICER) in Turin, Italy, as well as the Statistical and Applied Mathematical Sciences Institute (SAMSI).

== Honors and recognition ==
- In 2015 Dukic was elected as a Fellow of the American Statistical Association “for important contributions to Bayesian modeling of complex processes and analysis of Big Data, substantive and collaborative research in infectious diseases and climate change, and service to the profession, including excellence in editorial work.”
- The paper Predicting multivariate insurance loss payments under the Bayesian copula framework (co-authored with Y. Zhang) was awarded the 2014 American Risk and Insurance Association (ARIA) Prize for “the most valuable contribution to casualty actuarial science.”
- Dukic was the recipient of the John Van Ryzin Award in 2000, awarded by the International Biometrics Society (ENAR) for the best student paper.
- University Fellowship, Brown University
- John Hancock Award, Bryant University
- Bryant Actuarial Scholarship, Bryant University
