= David A. Savitz =

American medical academic

David A. Savitz is a professor of Community Health in the Epidemiology Section of the Program in Public Health, Vice President for Research, and Professor of Obstetrics and Gynecology, at The Alpert Medical School of Brown University, and Associate Director for Perinatal Research in The Department of Obstetrics and Gynecology at Women & Infants Hospital, both in Providence, Rhode Island. Savitz is the author of Interpreting epidemiologic evidence: strategies for study design and analysis (ISBN 0-19-510840-X) and more than 275 peer-reviewed articles. He was elected to the Institute of Medicine in 2007.

== Biography ==
Savitz graduated from Brandeis University with a B.A. degree in psychology in 1975. He completed his M.S. degree in preventive medicine at Ohio State University in 1978, and earned his Ph.D. degree in epidemiology from the University of Pittsburgh Graduate School of Public Health in 1982.

Until 1985, Savitz was Assistant Professor in the Department of Preventive Medicine and Biometrics at the University of Colorado School of Medicine. He then moved to the University of North Carolina; he was appointed Professor and Chair of the University's Department of Epidemiology in 1996, a position he held until 2005.

In January 2006, he joined The Mount Sinai Medical Center as Professor of Preventive Medicine and Director of the Epidemiology, Biostatistics, and Prevention Institute.

Savitz is a former editor at the American Journal of Epidemiology and a member of the Epidemiology and Disease Control - 1 Study Section of the National Institutes of Health. He is a former president of the Society for Epidemiologic Research and the Society for Pediatric and Perinatal Epidemiologic Research and the North American Regional Councilor for the International Epidemiological Association. He is currently an editor at the journal Epidemiology.

Interests include a range of epidemiological, pre- and postnatal and cancer issues, including the connection between miscarriage and C8/C8S, links between alcohol consumption and breast cancer, the effect of drinking water DBPs on fetal survival, links between caffeine and miscarriage and exposure to chemicals and the risk of breast cancer.

In September 2010, Savitz joined Brown University's Alpert Medical School as Professor of Community Health (Epidemiology Section) and Obstetrics and Gynecology. In addition, he joined The Department of Obstetrics and Gynecology at Women & Infants Hospital of Rhode Island as associate director of the Division of Research.

== Active grants ==
Savitz's research interests include a range of topics in perinatal and pediatric health, cancer, and the environment. These include environmental influences on miscarriage, caffeine and pregnancy outcome, and environmental influences on cancer in children and adults. He has completed 47 grants and is principal investigator or investigator on the following active grants:

| Source | Title |
|---|---|
| Garden City Group, Inc. | Analyses of C8 Health Project Data on Reproductive Outcomes |
| Garden City Group, Inc. | C8 Exposure and birth Outcomes based on Vital Records |
| NIH R21HD0588111 | The Epidemiology of Hospitalized Postpartum Depression |
| NIH 1R01HD058008 | Prenatal Smoking, Maternal & Fetal Genetic Variation & Risk of Preeclampsia |
| U01-DE017018 | Risk Factors for Onset and Persistence of TMD |
| HHSN26720070047C | National Children's Study Vanguard Centers |
| Garden City Group, Inc. | C8 Exposure and Neurobehavioral Development Study |
| 1R01HL086507 | Cardiovascular Health of Seniors and the Built Environment |

== Books ==
- Bertollini R, Lebowitz MD, Saracci R, Savitz DA (editors). Environmental epidemiology. Exposure and disease. Proceedings of an international workshop on priorities in environmental epidemiology. Boca Raton, FL: Lewis Publishers, 1995. ISBN 1-56670-067-1
- Steenland K, Savitz DA (editors). Topics in environmental epidemiology. New York, NY: Oxford University Press, 1997. ISBN 0-19-509564-2
- Savitz DA. Interpreting epidemiologic evidence: strategies for study design and analysis. New York, NY: Oxford University Press, 2003. ISBN 0-19-510840-X

== Publications ==
Partial list:

- Stein CR, Ellis JA, Savitz DA, Vichinsky L, Perl SB (2009). "Decline in smoking during pregnancy in New York City, 1995-2005". Public Health Rep. 124 (6): 841–9. doi:10.1177/003335490912400612. PMC 2773948. PMID 19894427.
- Harville EW, Savitz DA, Dole N, Herring AH, Thorp JM (September 2009). "Stress questionnaires and stress biomarkers during pregnancy". J Women's Health (Larchmt). 18 (9): 1425–33. doi:10.1089/jwh.2008.1102. PMC 2825685. PMID 19757520.
- Stein CR, Savitz DA, Janevic T; et al. (December 2009). "Maternal ethnic ancestry and adverse perinatal outcomes in New York City". Am. J. Obstet. Gynecol. 201 (6): 584.e1–9. doi:10.1016/j.ajog.2009.06.047. PMC 2789914. PMID 19729145.
- Stein CR, Savitz DA, Dougan M (October 2009). "Serum levels of perfluorooctanoic acid and perfluorooctane sulfonate and pregnancy outcome". Am. J. Epidemiol. 170 (7): 837–46. doi:10.1093/aje/kwp212. PMID 19692329.
- Moline JM, Herbert R, Crowley L; et al. (August 2009). "Multiple myeloma in World Trade Center responders: a case series". J. Occup. Environ. Med. 51 (8): 896–902. doi:10.1097/JOM.0b013e3181ad49c8. PMID 19620891.
- Epidemiologic (Sep 2009). "a review. Ahlbom A, Feychting M, Green A, Kheifets L, Savitz DA, Swerdlow AJ; ICNIRP (International Commission for Non-Ionizing Radiation Protection) Standing Committee on Epidemiology". Epidemiology. 20 (5): 639–52. doi:10.1097/EDE.0b013e3181b0927d. PMID 19593153.
- Hasan R, Olshan AF, Herring AH, Savitz DA, Siega-Riz AM, Hartmann KE (June 2009). "Self-reported vitamin supplementation in early pregnancy and risk of miscarriage". Am. J. Epidemiol. 169 (11): 1312–8. doi:10.1093/aje/kwp050. PMC 2727248. PMID 19372214.
- Prevalence (Mar 2009). "an ultrasound-screening study. Laughlin SK, Baird DD, Savitz DA, Herring AH, Hartmann KE". Obstet Gynecol. 113 (3): 630–5. doi:10.1097/AOG.0b013e318197bbaf. PMC 3384531. PMID 19300327.
- Engel SM, Janevic TM, Stein CR, Savitz DA (January 2009). "Maternal smoking, preeclampsia, and infant health outcomes in New York City, 1995-2003". Am. J. Epidemiol. 169 (1): 33–40. doi:10.1093/aje/kwn293. PMC 2720705. PMID 19001134.
- Hoffman CS, Messer LC, Mendola P, Savitz DA, Herring AH, Hartmann KE (November 2008). "Comparison of gestational age at birth based on last menstrual period and ultrasound during the first trimester". Paediatr Perinat Epidemiol. 22 (6): 587–96. doi:10.1111/j.1365-3016.2008.00965.x. PMID 19000297.
- Thorp JM, Dole N, Herring AH; et al. (November 2008). "Alteration in vaginal microflora, douching prior to pregnancy, and preterm birth". Paediatr Perinat Epidemiol. 22 (6): 530–7. doi:10.1111/j.1365-3016.2008.00970.x. PMC 3546548. PMID 19000290.
- Forssén UM, Wright JM, Herring AH, Savitz DA, Nieuwenhuijsen MJ, Murphy PA (September 2009). "Variability and predictors of changes in water use during pregnancy". J Expo Sci Environ Epidemiol. 19 (6): 593–602. Bibcode:2009JESEE..19..593F. doi:10.1038/jes.2008.59. PMID 18830235.
- Nomura Y, Halperin JM, Newcorn JH; et al. (May 2009). "The risk for impaired learning-related abilities in childhood and educational attainment among adults born near-term". J Pediatr Psychol. 34 (4): 406–18. doi:10.1093/jpepsy/jsn092. PMC 2722131. PMID 18794190.
- Savitz DA (November 2008). "Invited commentary: disaggregating preterm birth to determine etiology". Am. J. Epidemiol. 168 (9): 990–2, discussion 993–4. doi:10.1093/aje/kwn193. PMID 18756017.
- Elliott P, Savitz DA (August 2008). "Design issues in small-area studies of environment and health". Environ. Health Perspect. 116 (8): 1098–104. Bibcode:2008EnvHP.116.1098E. doi:10.1289/ehp.10817. PMC 2516594. PMID 18709174.
- Hoffman CS, Mendola P, Savitz DA; et al. (September 2008). "Drinking water disinfection by-product exposure and fetal growth". Epidemiology. 19 (5): 729–37. doi:10.1097/EDE.0b013e3181812bd4. PMID 18633330.
