= Silas M. Burroughs (pharmacist) =

American businessman (1846–1895)

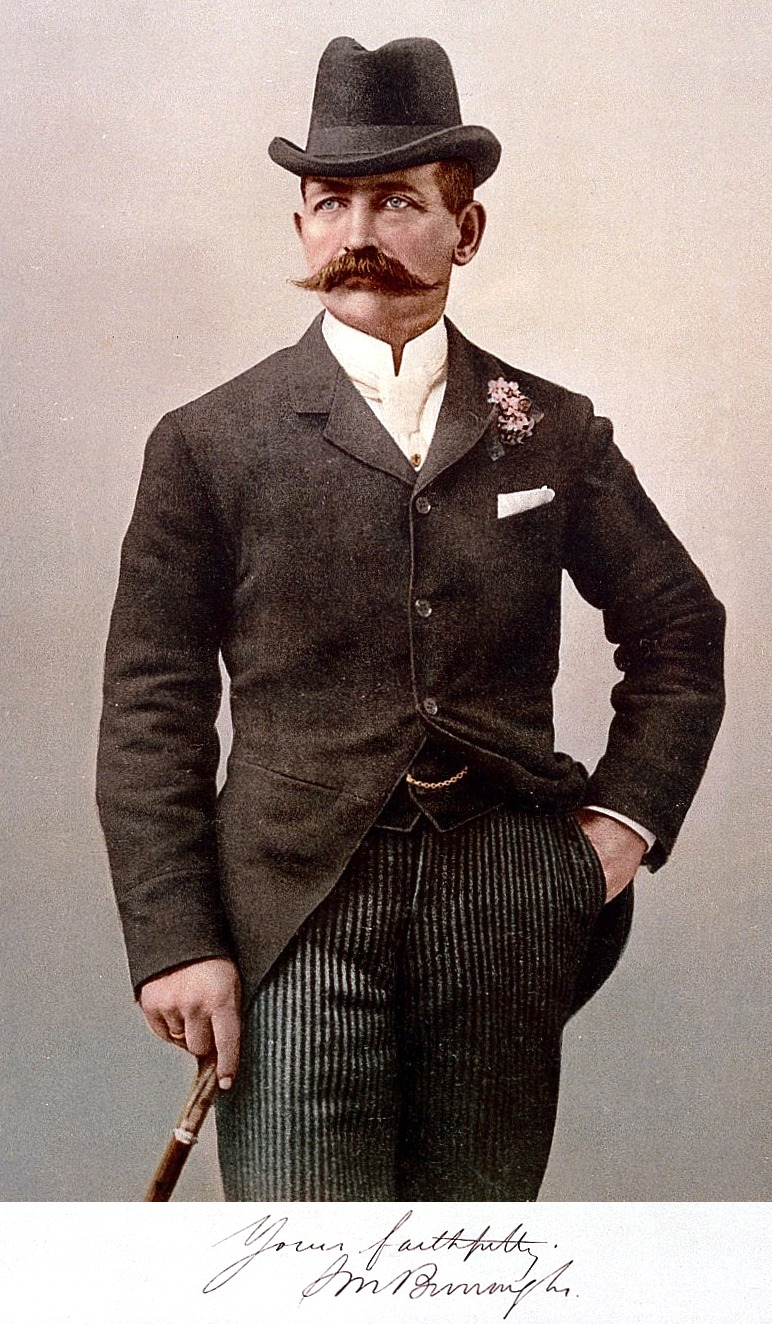

Silas Mainville Burroughs (December 24, 1846 – February 6, 1895) was an American pharmaceutical entrepreneur who founded Burroughs Wellcome & Co.

== Biography ==
Born in Medina, New York, United States, he was the son of Congressman Silas M. Burroughs (1810–1860). His mother died when he was five and his father when he was 13. He grew up with his aunt and uncle, and started his professional career by working in drugstores, then as a travelling pharmaceutical salesman. In 1869 he joined the Philadelphia firm John Wyeth & Bro (now Wyeth Pharmaceuticals). He graduated from the Philadelphia College of Pharmacy in 1877.

In 1878, he travelled to London, England, as an agent for Wyeth, and founded Burroughs & Co., which imported their goods as well as acquiring other agencies' products and marketing his own goods. In 1880 he convinced his American-born friend Henry Wellcome to join the firm, helping him financially to become junior partner in the renamed Burroughs Wellcome & Company. In order to expand the firm Burroughs undertook a promotional world tour from 1881 to 1884. He travelled on the S.S. Ceylon on the first commercial round-the-world cruise, from Southampton leaving the Ceylon at Bombay. In India, Australia and New Zealand he made important contacts and laid the foundations for future trade in those countries.

On his return the firm's headquarters had moved to Snow Hill, London and manufacturing subsequently moved to Dartford, Kent. The purchase of the Dartford building was one of a number of issues that caused friction between the partners, their close friendship deteriorated and in 1889 Burroughs unsuccessfully tried to dissolve the partnership. They were in the process of discussing the dissolution again in 1894 when Burroughs died suddenly the following January.

Burroughs, Wellcome & Company's successfully introduced new ideas for marketing and advertising (including the patenting of the word 'tabloid'); an increasing range of products and success at major international exhibitions.

Burroughs was a visionary employer, supporting the eight-hour working day, profit-sharing, and numerous social and radical political movements including free travel, Irish Home Rule and world peace. He was a good friend and supporter of Henry George and the Single Tax Movement promoting it at every opportunity. He became increasingly active in the Liberal Party, was president of the Bexleyheath Liberal and Radical Club and it was suggested that he enter parliament.

He became a British subject in 1890.

Attracted to Christian socialism, he was a staunch Presbyterian: His philanthropism culminated in the foundation of the Livingstone Hospital at Dartford.

Burroughs was known for pushing himself to the limit. When recovering from flu on a cycling trip on the French Riviera he exhausted himself and developed pneumonia. He died in Monte Carlo, aged 49 leaving his wife, Olive, and three children, Anna, Frances and Stanley. Olive died in 1905 and was buried there with him. Under the terms of his will each employee received a share of his wealth which amounted to six guineas each. Following his death a Burroughs scholarship was created and administered by the Royal Pharmaceutical Society.

Burroughs' widow Olive tried to retain an interest in the firm however Wellcome exercised his right to buy the share outright. It wasn't until 1924 that Wellcome changed the name of the firm to the Wellcome Foundation Limited such was the recognition and value of the name Burroughs.

The personal papers of both Silas Burroughs and Henry Wellcome as well as records of the firm are available for study at the Wellcome Collection.

== Sources ==
- Roy Church, 'The British Market for Medicine in the late Nineteenth Century: The Innovative Impact of S M Burroughs & Co', Medical History 2005 July 1; 49(3): 281–298 (online text as PDF)
- Chris Beckett, 'Attitudes to Political and Commercial Endorsement in the Business Papers of Silas Mainville Burroughs, with Particular Reference to Henry Morton Stanley', Medical History 2008 January 1; 52(1): 107–128 (online text as PDF)
- Silas Mainville Burroughs: The Forgotten Story
