= Velanidia, Kozani =

Velanidia Βελανιδιά
- Community
- Location within Greece
- Coordinates: 40°21.1′N 21°19.9′E
- Country: Greece
- Administrative region: Western Macedonia
- Regional unit: Kozani
- Municipality: Voio
- Municipal unit: Neapoli
- Elevation: 720 m (2,360 ft)

Population (2021)
  - Community: 71
- Time zone: UTC+2 (EET)
  - Summer (DST): UTC+3 (EEST)
- Postal code: 500 01
- Area code: +30-2468
- Vehicle registration: ΚΖ

Velanidia (Greek: Βελανιδιά, before 1927: Σταρμπάδες – Starmpades), is a village and a community of the Voio municipality. Before the 2011 local government reform it was part of the municipality of Neapoli, of which it was a municipal district. The 2021 census recorded 71 inhabitants in the community of Velanidia.

== Administrative division ==
The community of Velanidia consists of two separate settlements:

- Sterna (population 20 in 2021)
- Velanidia (population 51)

== See also ==
- List of settlements in the Kozani regional unit
