= Joseph Born Kadane =

American statistician (born 1941)

- Born: January 10, 1941 (age 85); Washington, D.C., U.S.
- Education: Harvard College (A.B.); Stanford University (Ph.D.) (1966)
- Known for: Maximum subarray problem, statistical inference, econometrics, statistical methods in social science, sequential problems
- Scientific career
- Fields: Mathematics
- Workplaces: Carnegie Mellon University; Yale University; Center for Naval Analyses
- Thesis: Comparison of Estimators in Simultaneous Equation Econometric Models when the Results are Small (1966)
- Doctoral advisor: Herman Chernoff
- Doctoral students: Don Berry; Giovanni Parmigiani

Joseph "Jay" Born Kadane (born January 10, 1941) is the Leonard J. Savage University Professor of Statistics, Emeritus in the Department of Statistics and Social and Decision Sciences at Carnegie Mellon University. Kadane is one of the early proponents of Bayesian statistics, particularly the subjective Bayesian philosophy.

== Education and career ==
Kadane was born in Washington, DC and raised in Freeport on Long Island. Kadane prepared at Phillips Exeter Academy, earned an A.B. in mathematics from Harvard College and a Ph.D. in statistics from Stanford in 1966, under the supervision of Professor Herman Chernoff. While in graduate school, Kadane worked for the Center for Naval Analyses (CNA). Upon finishing, he accepted a joint appointment at the Yale statistics department and the Cowles Foundation. In 1968, he left Yale and served as an analyst at CNA for three years. In 1971, he moved to Pittsburgh to join Morris H. DeGroot at Carnegie Mellon University. He became the second tenured professor in the Department of Statistics. Kadane served as department head from 1972 to 1981 and steered the department to a balance between theoretical and applied work, advocating that statisticians should engage in joint research in substantive areas rather than acting as consultants.

== Research ==
Kadane's contributions span a wide range of fields: econometrics, law, medicine, political science, sociology, computer science (see maximum subarray problem), archaeology, and environmental science, among others. He has been elected as a Fellow of the American Academy of Arts and Sciences, a fellow of the American Association for the Advancement of Science, a fellow of the American Statistical Association, and a fellow of the Institute of Mathematical Statistics. Kadane authored over 250 peer-reviewed publications and has served the statistical community in many capacities, including as editor of the Journal of the American Statistical Association from 1983-85.

== See also ==
- Maximum subarray problem#Kadane's algorithm

== Bibliography ==
- Kadane, Joseph B., ed. (1996). Bayesian methods and ethics in a clinical trial design. New York: Wiley. ISBN 978-1-118-15060-3. OCLC 757486965.
- Kadane, Joseph B.; Schum, David A. (1996). A probabilistic analysis of the Sacco and Vanzetti evidence. New York: Wiley. ISBN 978-1-118-15058-0. OCLC 761319825.
- Kadane, Joseph B.; Schervish, Mark J.; Seidenfeld, Teddy, eds. (1999). Rethinking the foundations of statistics. Cambridge: Cambridge University Press. ISBN 0-521-64011-3. OCLC 40269227.
- Kadane, Joseph B., ed. (2008). Statistics in the law. Oxford: Oxford University Press. ISBN 978-0-19-804221-1. OCLC 254160827.
- Kadane, Joseph B. (2020). Pragmatics of Uncertainty. CRC Press. ISBN 978-0-367-73681-1. OCLC 1201660814.
- Kadane, Joseph B. (2020). Principles of Uncertainty (2nd ed.). Boca Raton, FL. ISBN 978-1-315-16756-5. OCLC 1154112761.
