= Don Berry =

Don Berry may refer to:

- Don Berry (author) (1931–2001), American artist and author
- Don Berry (golfer), see Minnesota State Open
- Don Berry (statistician) (born 1940), American statistician

== See also ==
- Don Barry (disambiguation)
