= Hasselblad Masters Award =

Hasselblad Masters Award is an bi-annual award granted by the camera company Hasselblad to selected photographers each year across various specialties in recognition of exceptional accomplishment through photography. While its sister prize, the Hasselblad Award, is managed by the Hasselblad Foundation, the Hasselblad Masters Award and its book publishing and touring exhibition projects are overseen directly by the company's senior executive committee.

== Overview ==
"The Hasselblad Masters Award is among the most prestigious in the industry, honoring the best in both established and rising photographic talent." Entries are usually invited the month of May in the previous, and the finalist as announced late in the year, subsequently the winners are announced in the month of January. The jury for the award includes many of the most prominent names in photography, including photographers, editors, agents, and publishers. Categories for the selected photographers include Fine Art, Nature/Landscape, Portrait, Fashion, Editorial, Product, Architecture, Social/Wedding, and General Photography. Each year since 2008 the jury has also selected an "upcoming talent" for an emerging photographer who has rapidly gained the attention of the art and advertising community.

Starting 2014, photographs both in medium format and 35mm-type DSLRs (minimum 16 megapixel) were allowed. new category "Underwater" was added and the former "Up & Coming" category was converted "Project/21" category, wherein amateurs, students, assistants and young professionals who are 21 years old or younger could enter.

== Book and exhibition ==
The winners are provided with Hasselblad equipment for their projects as a part of the Masters Book for the year. The selected Hasselblad Masters each create a chapter of original images for the year's Hasselblad Masters Book, a large-format book from TeNeues. The images created for the Hasselblad Masters book are reproduced in large-format fine art prints for exhibition in cities around the world. Recent locations have included London, Hamburg, New York, Bogota, and Hong Kong.

== Hasselblad Masters Award recipients ==
| Year | Recipients |
|---|---|
| 2001 | Anton Corbijn, Per Nagel, Howard Schatz, Hans van Ommeren, Bernhard Edmaier, Isabel Muñoz, Mario Cravo Neto, Michael Grecco, Matilda Lindeblad, Ian Patrick, Phyllis Galembo, Xie Mo |
| 2002 | Jim Brandenburg, Michael Halsband, Rodney Smith, Stefan Schipper, Per Zennström, Charlie Waite, Morten Krogvold, Tomas Yeh, Sally Gall, Juan Zi, Ferit Kuyas, Marcos Prado |
| 2003 | Patrick Demarchelier, Sarah Silver, Joyce Tenneson, Kay Chin Tay, Nicholas Sinclair, Ralf Tooten, Wang Jianjun, Carlos Casariego, Beat Presser, Brigitte Carnochan, Duda Carvalho, Tore Hagman |
| 2004 | Albert Watson, Mary Ellen Mark, Nigel Parry, Daniel Klajmic, Kevin Bubriski, Herdis Maria Siegert, Christopher Burkett, Jian Junyu, Lennart Olson, Francisco Gomes, Helena You, Luciano Monti |
| 2005 | Suza Scalora, Greg Hocking, Lois Greenfield, Kay Berg, Walter Schels, Tarun Khiwal, Hans Gedda, Frederick Bertin, Jian Cheng Dong, Heidi Niemala, Mark Buscail, Chris Simpson |
| 2006 | Warwick Saint, Carlos Serrao, Jack Guy, Hans Neleman, Christian Kettiger, Elisabeth Carmel, David Trood, Andreas Teichmann, Uli Weber, Oscar Mattsson, Roth and Ramberg, Michael Graf |
| 2007 | Russell James, Marco Grob, Peter Mathis, Raya, Dominique Amphonesinh, Stuart Weston, Tang Hui, Laurence Laborie, Barry Ryan, Paolo Esposito, Carl Lyttle, Chase Jarvis |
| 2008 | August Bradley (Upcoming Talent), Julia Fullerton-Batten (Fine Art), Louie Palu (Editorial), Benjamin A. Monn (Architectural), Bronek Kozka (General), Hans Strand (Landscapes/Nature), Andrej Kopac (Fashion/Beauty), Morfi Jiménez Mercado (Portrait), Gregor Halenda (Products), Kevin Then (Wedding/Social) |
| 2009 | Lyle Owerko (Upcoming Talent), Mark Holthusen (Products), Nina Berman (Editorial), Stephan Zirwes (Architectural), Dirk Rees (Fashion/Beauty), Mark Zibert (General), Bang Peng (Landscapes/Nature), Claudio Napolitano (Portrait), Joao Carlos (Wedding/Social), Alexandfelix (Fine Art) |
| 2012 | Vicente Ansola (Upcoming Talent), Joe Felzman (Products), Jon Lowenstein (Editorial), Frank Meyl (Architectural), Wai Kuen Eric Wong (Fashion/Beauty), Ken Hermann (General), Tom D. Jones (Landscapes/Nature), Denis Rouvre (Portrait), Milosz Wozaczynski (Wedding/Social), Olivier Valsecchi (Fine Art), Lucas Pupo (Wildlife) |
| 2014 | Martin Schubert (Architecture), Antonio Pedrosa (Editorial), Roman Jehanno (General), Bara Prasilova (Fashion/Beauty), Rafal Maleszyk (Fine Art), Hengki Koentjoro (Landscapes/Nature), Dmitry Ageev (Portrait), Bryn Griffiths (Product), Paul Gisbrecht (Project/21), Chris Straley (Underwater), Joseph Goh Meng Huat (Wedding/Social), Rafael Rojas (Wildlife) |
| 2015 | Swee Oh (Architecture), Katerina Belkina (Art), Roy Rossovich (Fashion/Beauty), Lars van de Goor (Landscapes/Nature), Natalia Evelyn Bencicova (Portrait), Giorgio Cravero (Product), Jake Reeder (Project//21), Ali Rajabi (Street/Urban), John Paul Evans (Wedding), David Peskens (Wildlife) |
| 2018 | Aerial - Jorge de la Torriente – Miami, USA. Architecture - Kamilla Hanapova - St. Petersburg, Russia Art - Maria Svarbova - Bratislava, Slovakia Beauty & Fashion - Michal Baran - Trim, Ireland Landscape - Benjamin Everett - Lopez Island, USA Portrait - Tina Signesdottir Hult - Torvastad, Norway Product - Marcin Gizycki - Warszawa, Poland Project//21 (Under 21) - Nabil Rosman - Kota Bharu, Malaysia Street / Urban – Ben Thomas - Kyneton, Australia Wedding – Victor Hamke - Leipzig, Germany Wildlife - Karim Iliya - Haiku, USA |
| 2021 | Aerial - Florian Ledoux, Architecture - Albrecht Voss, Art - Gavin Goodman, Beauty & Fashion - Ramón Vaquero, Landscape / Nature - Honghua Shi, Portrait - Marek Würfl, Product - Paul Fuentes, Project21 - Yihao Wang, Street / Urban - Nikolay Schegolev, Wedding - Mati Machner, Wildlife - Alice Zilberberg, Heritage - Marcus Møller Bitsch |

== Sources ==
- 2012 Hasselblad Masters winners
- 2014 Masters Jury

https://www.hasselblad.com/press/press-releases/hasselblad-announces-winners-of-masters-awards-2018/
