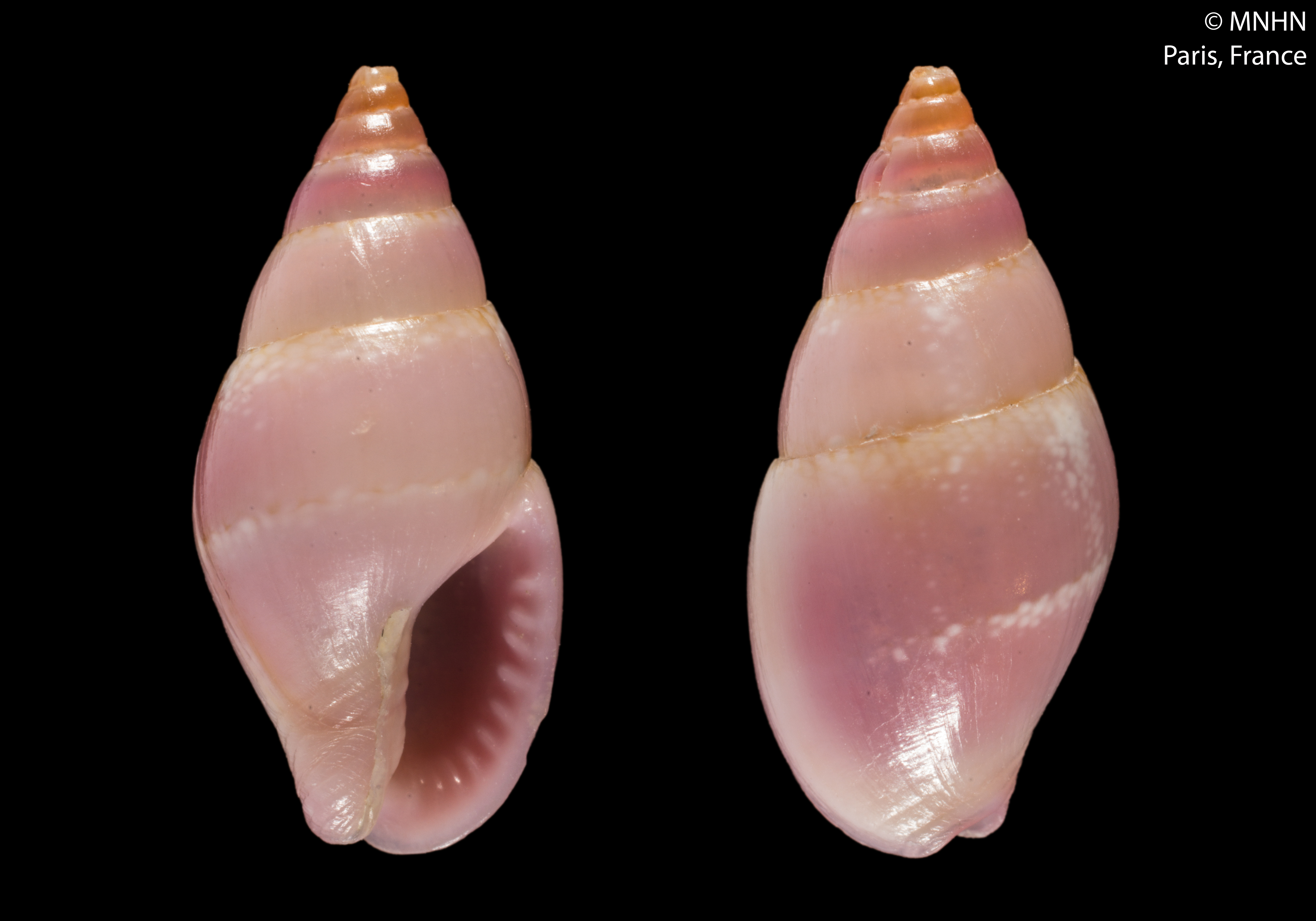
- Shell of Mitrella chantalae (holotype at MNHN, Paris)

Scientific classification
- Kingdom: Animalia
- Phylum: Mollusca
- Class: Gastropoda
- Subclass: Caenogastropoda
- Order: Neogastropoda
- Family: Columbellidae
- Genus: Mitrella
- Species: M. chantalae

Binomial name
- Mitrella chantalae Bozzetti, 2006

= Mitrella chantalae =

Species of gastropod

Mitrella chantalae is a species of sea snail, a marine gastropod mollusk in the family Columbellidae, the dove snails.

== Description ==
The length of its shell ranges from 11 to 13 mm, is a smooth, reddish-brown, covered with a pattern of lighter, round spots, has a pointed spire, the whorls of the spire may have bands of alternating white and brown, the inner surface of the shell is a whitish color, the outer lip of the shell is thickened and has small, folded or tooth-like ridges on the inside.

== Distribution ==
This marine species occurs off Madagascar.
