= Sieve method =

Sieve method, or the method of sieves, can mean:

- in mathematics and computer science, the sieve of Eratosthenes, a simple method for finding prime numbers
  - in number theory, any of a variety of methods studied in sieve theory
  - in combinatorics, the set of methods dealt with in sieve theory or more specifically, the inclusion–exclusion principle
- in statistics, and particularly econometrics, the use of sieve estimators
