= Stones and roses =

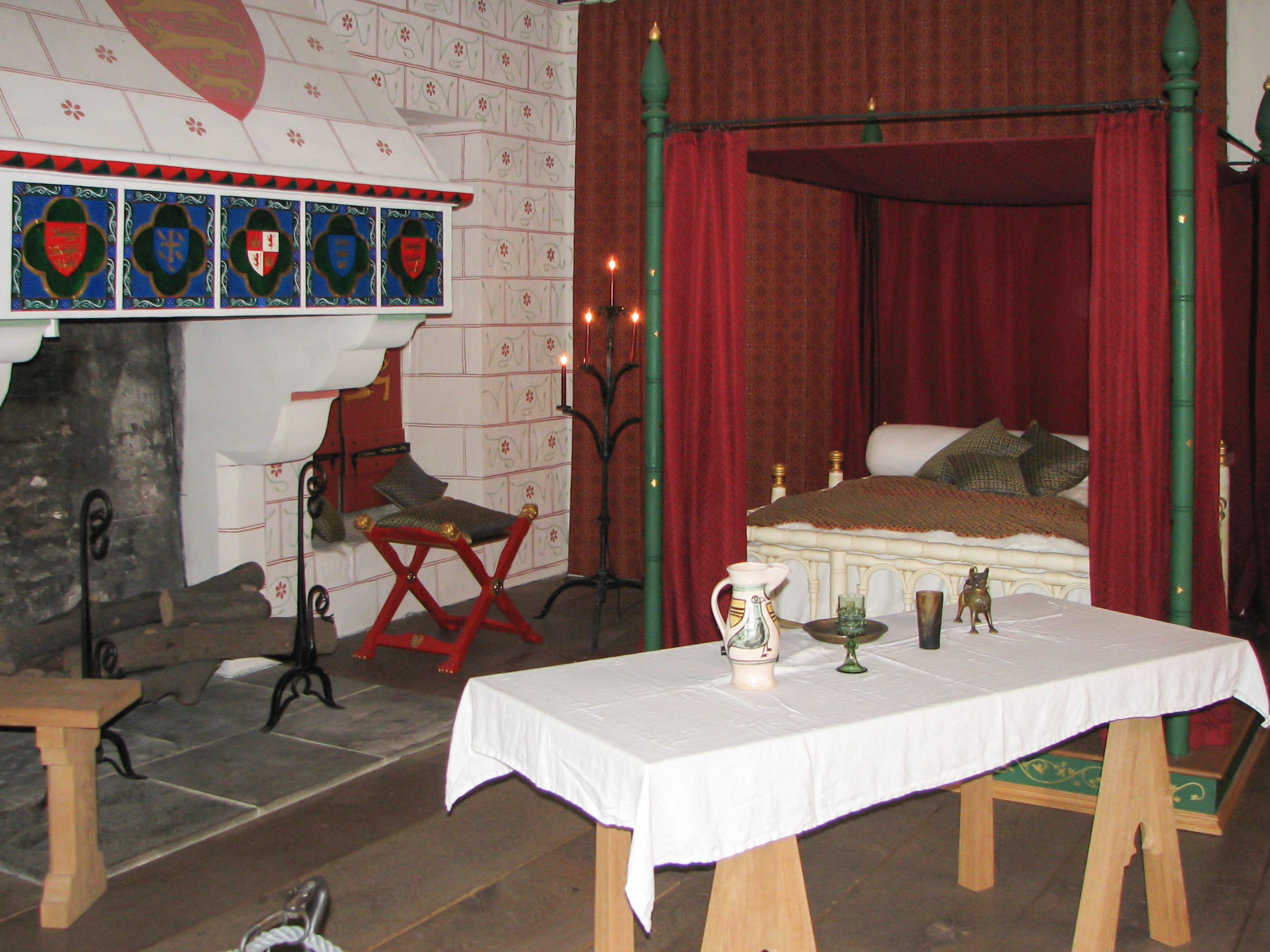
Reconstitution of Edward I of England apartments at the Tower of London with a stones and roses pattern on the wall.

Stones and roses is a pattern emulating masonry with little roses on the bricks. The pattern is believed to have been the most typical of all interior decorating designs in the mid 13th century.

The Queen of England had the pattern on her bedroom wall in the Tower of London.
