= Chase Jarvis =

American photographer, director, artist, and entrepreneur

Chase Aaron Jarvis
- Born: July 19, 1971 (age 55); Seattle, Washington
- Education: San Diego State University (BA)
- Occupations: Photographer, director, author, entrepreneur
- Notable work: CreativeLive
- Website: ChaseJarvis.com

Chase Jarvis is an American photographer, director, artist, and entrepreneur. From April 2014 until July 2022 Jarvis was the chief executive officer of CreativeLive, an online education platform that he co-founded in 2010.

== Early life ==
Jarvis was born in Seattle, Washington. His father was a Seattle Police Department officer, and his mother was an administrator at a biotech company. He attended San Diego State University on a football scholarship, receiving a BA in philosophy with distinction.

Initially, Jarvis planned to attend medical school after graduating from university. A few weeks before Jarvis' graduation, his grandfather died and left all his photography equipment to his grandson. Jarvis subsequently went on a post-college trip through Europe and discovered a passion for photography. He is self-taught, having learned photography through experimenting and independent study. Jarvis has said of his decision not to pursue a degree in medicine, "[I] spent years of my life and 10s of thousands of dollars chasing everyone else's dream for what I was supposed to become rather than chasing my own. It was when I finally quit that path and pursued my own calling to become a photographer and an entrepreneur that I really felt alive."

== Career ==
=== Photography ===
In 1994, Jarvis moved to Steamboat Springs, Colorado, with his girlfriend, where he began shooting photos of pro snowboarders and skiers. Jarvis licensed his first image for $500 and a pair of skis. Jarvis continued to pursue photography while studying Philosophy and Art at the University of Washington's MA/PhD program. One year before completing his master's degree, Jarvis licensed a batch of his photos to REI that allowed him to leave academia and open his own studio, Chase Jarvis, Inc.

Since opening his own studio Jarvis has photographed for Volvo, Nike, Apple, Microsoft, General Motors, Google, Samsung, Hewlett-Packard, Columbia Sportswear, REI, Honda, Subaru, Target, Pepsi, McDonald's, and Red Bull. He is known for his kinetic style and emphasis on lifestyle, sports, and landscape photo imagery and his photography sells from anywhere between $50 and $50,000. In 2007, Chase Jarvis filed a lawsuit against K2 Sports for copyright infringement and won.

Jarvis has received endorsements from Polaroid (in conjunction with Lady Gaga) and Nikon. He helped launch the first video digital SLR camera, the Nikon D90, in 2008. Two years later, Jarvis helped launch the Nikon D7000.

On May 11, 2011, Jarvis installed Dasein: An Invitation to Hang in the lobby of the Ace Hotel in New York City, where he was the artist in residence. Over 10,000 submissions from around the world were part of Jarvis' art installation.

==== Awards and recognition ====
Jarvis is the youngest person to be named Hasselblad Master, Nikon Master, and ASMP Master. In 2008, Jarvis's Kung Fu HD series received first place in the Special Effects category at the International Photography Awards. The Best Camera app also won the Adorama Photography Award at the APPOS Awards. Jarvis has also received honors from the Prix de la Photographie de Paris, the Advertising Photographers of America, and Photo District News magazine for his work.

Jarvis contributed to The New York Times story "Snow Fall," which won the Pulitzer Prize for feature writing in 2013.

In 2014, Jarvis was recognized as one of the most influential photographers by the Huffington Post. That same year, he received an Emmy nomination for his documentary Portrait of a City.

=== Books ===
Jarvis published his first book, The Best Camera: Is the One That's With You, in 2009. The book celebrates images taken with cameras in mobile phones, particularly iPhones, and Jarvis released an iPhone app called Best Camera in conjunction with the book.

In 2010, Jarvis released his second book, Seattle 100, which is a collection of black and white portraits and biographies of people defining Seattle's culture. The proceeds of the book were donated to charity, and the book later became the basis for an Emmy-nominated documentary.

=== Best Camera ===
In 2009, Jarvis released a picture-editing iPhone app called Best Camera. With Best Camera, users can apply 14 different filters to images shot with their iPhone and then share those images directly with Facebook, Twitter, and TheBestCamera.com. The Best Camera app was credited with "setting a trend" in smartphone photography by The Times of India and was named to Wired Magazine's Top 20 iPhone Apps of 2009, Macworld's Best Photo App, and one of Apple executive Philip W. Schiller's favorite apps. Additionally, Jarvis published a companion book, called The Best Camera Is The One That's With You, which features photographs taken with his iPhone.

=== CreativeLive ===
Jarvis co-founded CreativeLive, an online education platform that offers free online classes in a variety of fields, in 2010. Since its founding, CreativeLive has become the world's largest live-streaming education company.

As the founder, Jarvis raised the Series A round of $7.5 million and Series B round of $21.5 million. On April 14, 2014, it was announced that Jarvis would become the CEO of CreativeLive, taking over for the previous CEO Mika Salmi. Speaking about CreativeLive in March 2015, Jarvis told The New York Times, "What we're trying to do is create the most vibrant learning experience we can."

In September 2018, CreativeLive laid off the majority of its employees. In October 2021, CreativeLive was acquired by the Israeli online marketplace Fiverr. In July 2022, Fiverr laid off most of the remaining employees, including Chase Jarvis.

=== Chase Jarvis Live ===
In June 2011 Jarvis and his team broadcast the first episode of Chase Jarvis Live via Ustream. The purpose of the series is to broadcast interviews and conduct Q & As with professionals the audience might find useful, such as other professional photographers, art directors and authors. Interviews are first broadcast live via Ustream and later uploaded to YouTube. Jarvis has interviewed dozens of industry leaders including the likes of Brené Brown, Jared Leto, Tim Ferriss, Macklemore & Ryan Lewis, Adrian Grenier, Gary Vaynerchuk, and Guy Kawasaki.

== Other work ==
Jarvis is a keynote speaker, and has made speeches at conferences including Virgin Disruptors, TEDxCMU, PDN Photo Plus Expo, Photokina, and the Sundance Film Festival. He is also an angel investor; in 2011, he invested in Trippy, a social travel site. Jarvis has also invested in two Seattle restaurants, mkt. (pronounced "market") and Tallulah's.

In 2013, Jarvis was a mentor for the Shopify Build a Business program. In the summer of 2018 Jarvis partnered with Apple to create Photo Lab: Crafting Your Shot that will brings classes on photo technique to more than 500 Apple stores around the world.

Jarvis has a chapter giving advice in Tim Ferriss' book Tools of Titans.

=== Philanthropy ===
Jarvis has helped raise money for Free Arts NYC, organization that provide art programs to children. He is also an honorary board member of Pacific Photocenter NW, a board advisor at Blue Earth, and an ambassador for One Percent for the Planet.

== Bibliography ==
- The Best Camera Is The One That's With You (2009)
- Seattle 100 (2010)
- Creative Calling: Establish a Daily Practice, Infuse Your World with Meaning, and Succeed in Work + Life (2019)

== See also ==
- Hasselblad Masters Award
