= Ken Hermann =

Danish photographer

Ken Hermann is a Danish photographer.

== Projects ==
Hermann's Wrestlers in Mongolia project consists of portraits of wrestlers and ancient Mongolian wrestling matches in the Inner Mongolia.

His Explosion series captures explosions milliseconds after detonation.

He made a series of photographs of street performers on Hollywood Boulevard, many of whom were dressed as famous Hollywood characters.

Flower Men is a series of portraits of people selling flowers in the Malik Ghat Flower Market in Kolkata, India's largest wholesale flower bazaar.

Survivors is a series of portraits of survivors of acid attacks in Bangladesh.

== Publications ==
- Im Tal des Omo. Panorama, 2014. ISBN 3898234754.
- Flower Men. Heidelberg, Germany: Kehrer, 2017. ISBN 978-3868288056.

== Awards ==
- 2012: Winner, General category, Hasselblad Masters Award
- 2014: 3rd place, Portraiture, Professional competition, Sony World Photography Awards
- 2017: Winner, Sports category, PDN Photo Annual

== Exhibitions ==
- 2017 Copenhagen Photofestival
- 2017 La Quatrieme Image, Paris Coal Mines
- 2014 Somerset House ( Sony World Photography Award ), London May Survivors
- 2014 Gallery Nijenkam, Odense Survivors
- 2013 Gallery Kontraframe, Copenhagen Survivors
