= Mária Švarbová =

Slovak photographer (born 1988)

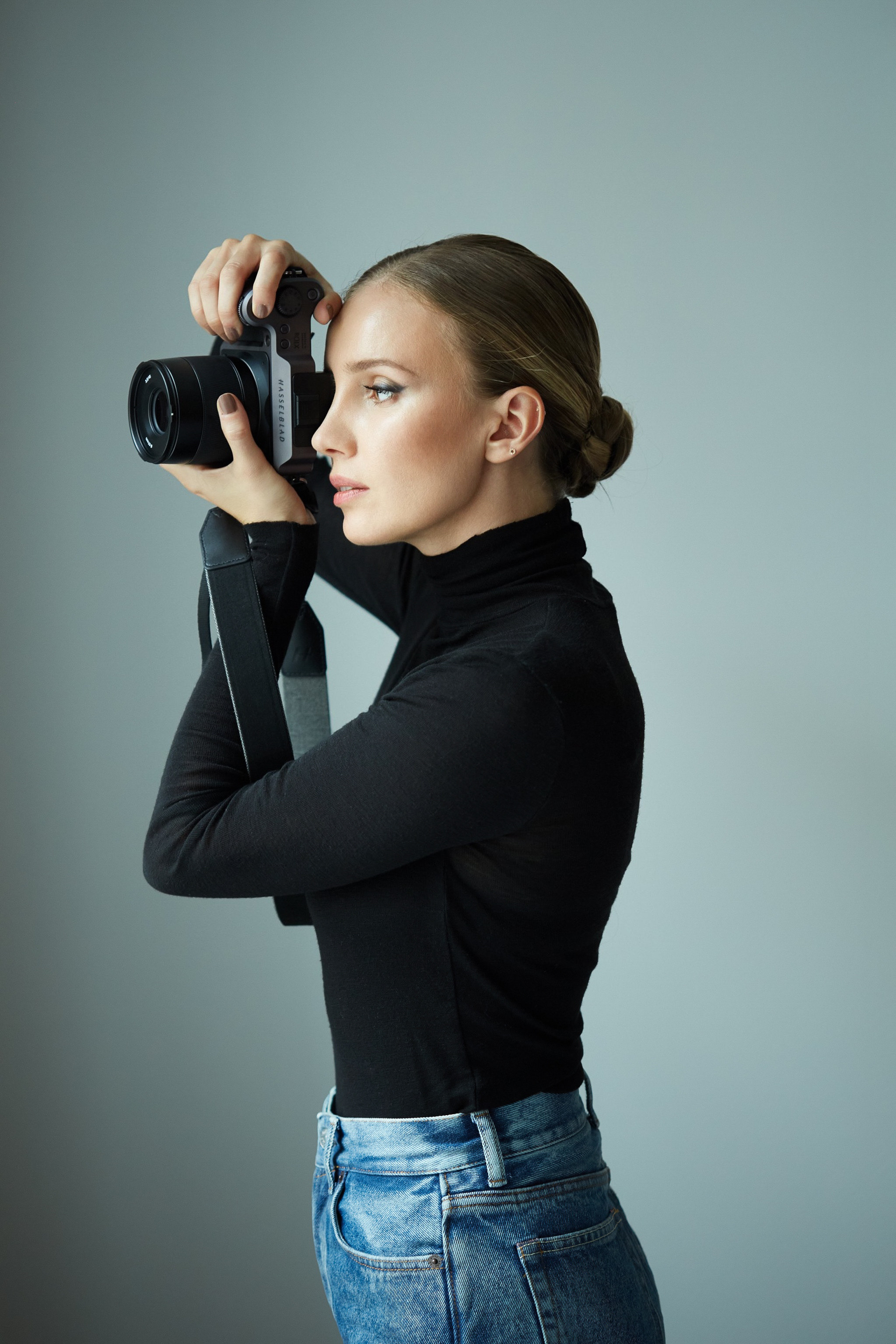
- Born: 1988 (age 37–38); Zlate Moravce, Slovakia
- Education: School of Applied Arts Josefa Vydru (Restoration), Constantine the Philosopher University (Archeology)
- Occupations: Fine-art photographer, art director
- Style: Conceptual photography
- Awards: Forbes 30 under 30, Hasselblad Master
- Website: mariasvarbova.com

Mária Švarbová (born 1988) is a Slovak fine-art photographer. Švarbová's most recognized collection is In the Swimming Pool.

== Biography ==
Švarbová was born in Zlaté Moravce, Slovakia and she currently lives in Bratislava, Slovakia. She attended Constantine the Philosopher University in Nitra and the School of Applied Arts Josefa Vydru in Bratislava. Švarbová's artworks have appeared in magazines such as Vogue, Forbes, CNN and The Guardian. She has been commissioned to photograph advertising campaigns for large international companies such as Apple, Murata and Museum of Ice Cream. Švarbová has been featured in numerous solo exhibitions in galleries and museums around the world.

== Style ==
Švarbová's works depict socialist-era architecture, public spaces and routine actions of daily life. The Guardian has described her work as "inspired by the stark architecture" of Slovakia. She prefers brutalist architecture and functionalism. She experiments with colours, space and symmetry of composition. CNN has described her typical post-production process as "the bodies are multiplied, colours are enhanced and asymmetrical elements are erased." Juxtapoz Magazine declares that characters in Švarbová's photography "have chosen to give up any kind of extravagance that might unmask them". Each scene is meticulously designed, especially with regard to the colours of the props and the minimalist poses of the models; the photographer relies on a lighting and costume team to do this.

== Bibliography ==
=== Books ===
- Mária Švarbová: Swimming Pool. New Heroes and Pioneers, 2017. ISBN 9789187815157
- Mária Švarbová: Futuro Retro. New Heroes and Pioneers, 2019. ISBN 9789187815584
- Mária Švarbová: Swimming Pools. New Heroes and Pioneers, 2021. ISBN 9789198656626

=== Articles ===
- Svarbova, Maria (April–May 2025). "Serene geometry". Aesthetica. 124: 52–63.

=== Interviews ===
- Jones, Megan (2022). "Composed minimalism". Aesthetica. (Note: Available on website only.)

Bibliography notes

== Exhibitions ==
Selected solo and group exhibitions.

- Photo London Fair, Artitled Contemporary, London, United Kingdom, 2024, Art Fair
- Art Madrid Fair, Gallery Bat, Madrid, Spain, 2024, Art Fair
- London Auction 'Ultimate', Phillips, London, United Kingdom, 2023-2024
- Remote Control, Danubiana Meulensteen Art Museum, Bratislava, Slovakia, 2023, Solo museum exhibition
- 어제의 미래 (Futuro Retro), Seoul Arts Center - Hangaram Art Museum, Seoul, South Korea, 2022-2023, Solo museum exhibition
- Fragile Concrete, Kolektiv Cité Radieuse, Marseille, France, 2021, Solo exhibition at Unité d’Habitation Le Corbusier
- 20th Century Art: A Different Perspective, London, United Kingdom, 2021, Sotheby's auction
- 212 Photography Istanbul, Istanbul, Turkey, 2020, International Photography Festival
- Gilman Contemporary, Ketchum, Idaho, United States, 2020, Solo gallery exhibition
- Lotte Gallery Jamsil, South Korea, 2019, Solo gallery exhibition
- Contessa Gallery, Worth Avenue, Palm Beach, Florida, US, 2019, Solo gallery exhibition
- Minnesota Marine Art Museum, Minnesota, US, 2019, Solo museum exhibition
- ART Miami, Contessa Gallery, Miami, Florida, US, 2019, Art Fair
- Asia Premiere Expo, Art Angle Gallery, Taipei, Taiwan, 2018, Solo exhibition of whole work
- Weather, Daelim Museum, Seoul, South Korea, 2018, Group museum exhibition
- Delpozo, Madrid and London, Spain and United Kingdom, 2017, Solo exhibition
- Leica Gallery, Miami, US, 2017, Solo gallery exhibition
- Vogue Italia, Milan, Italy, 2016, International Photography Festival
