= Mark Holthusen =

American photographer

Mark Holthusen is a San Francisco-based photographer most recognized for his set work on Roger Waters' opera, Ça Ira, and his "As I See It" advertising series for Kohler.

Holthusen received the 2008 Lucie Award for International Photographer of the Year in the Advertising category. He was named among Lürzer's Archive 200 Best Ad Photographers of 2008/2009. Holthusen also received the 2009 Hasselblad Masters Award for Product. Clients of his advertising work include Honda, Microsoft, Target and HBO.

Born and raised in Reno, Nevada, Holthusen directed and produced the Tiger Lillies' video "Living Hell". He provided album cover art for American Music Club's "The Golden Age".
