= Carlos Serrao =

American photographer

Carlos Serrao is an American photographer. He has photographed advertising campaigns for Nike, Speedo, Adidas, Puma, Reebok, Victoria's Secret, Lexus, Gap, Visa, Gatorade, SPYDER(Korea) and AT&T among many others.

== Career ==
His major advertising work began with Nike's Speed Campaign for the 2004 Athens Olympics, shooting 37 global athletes and resulting in the book The Beauty of Speed. He followed that successful campaign with other Nike global campaigns for 2006 World Cup Football and the 2008 Beijing Olympics. His current work adds numerous fashion projects for clients including Esquire, GQ, V Magazine and VMan Magazine. In 2008 he co-founded Departamento, a filmmaking collaborative which includes other filmmakers and photographers, and has created video content for Nike, Speedo, FM Global, Lexus, Esquire, GQ, V Magazine, VMan Magazine, ESPN, AT&T, and Victoria's Secret.

Serrao has shot many celebrities and professional athletes including Jack Nicholson, Josh Brolin, John Krasinski, Brooklyn Decker, Vanessa Paradis, Don Cheadle, Mickey Rourke, Michael Jordan, LeBron James, Kobe Bryant, Adrian Peterson, Tim Tebow, Lance Armstrong, Michael Phelps, Natalie Coughlin, Maria Sharapova, Serena Williams, Venus Williams, Roger Federer, and Cristiano Ronaldo.

== Recognition ==
In 2006 Serrao was named one of the Twelve photographers to receive the Hasselblad Masters Award for that year by the Swedish camera manufacturer Victor Hasselblad AB.

His other awards and recognitions include:

- 1st Place PDN Digital Editorial Awards 2006
- 1st Place PDN/Nikon Promo Design 2005 & 2006
- 1st Place PDN Digital Imaging 2004 mand
- American Photography 2006, 2007, 2008, and 2010

== Archived References ==
https://web.archive.org/web/20110711150717/http://www.hasselbladusa.com/masters-2006/april---carlos-serrao.aspx https://web.archive.org/web/20091115040540/http://www.bakmagazine.com/interviews/14/carlos-serrao https://web.archive.org/web/20100425045318/http://www.kanyeuniversecity.com/blog/2008/11/photographer-carlos-serrao/ https://web.archive.org/web/20100108021335/http://www.artlies.com/photographs/carlos-serrao.html http://www.esquire.com/style/style-manual-for-successful-men/work-animated-video-2010
