= Pattern =

Regularity in sensory qualia or abstract ideas

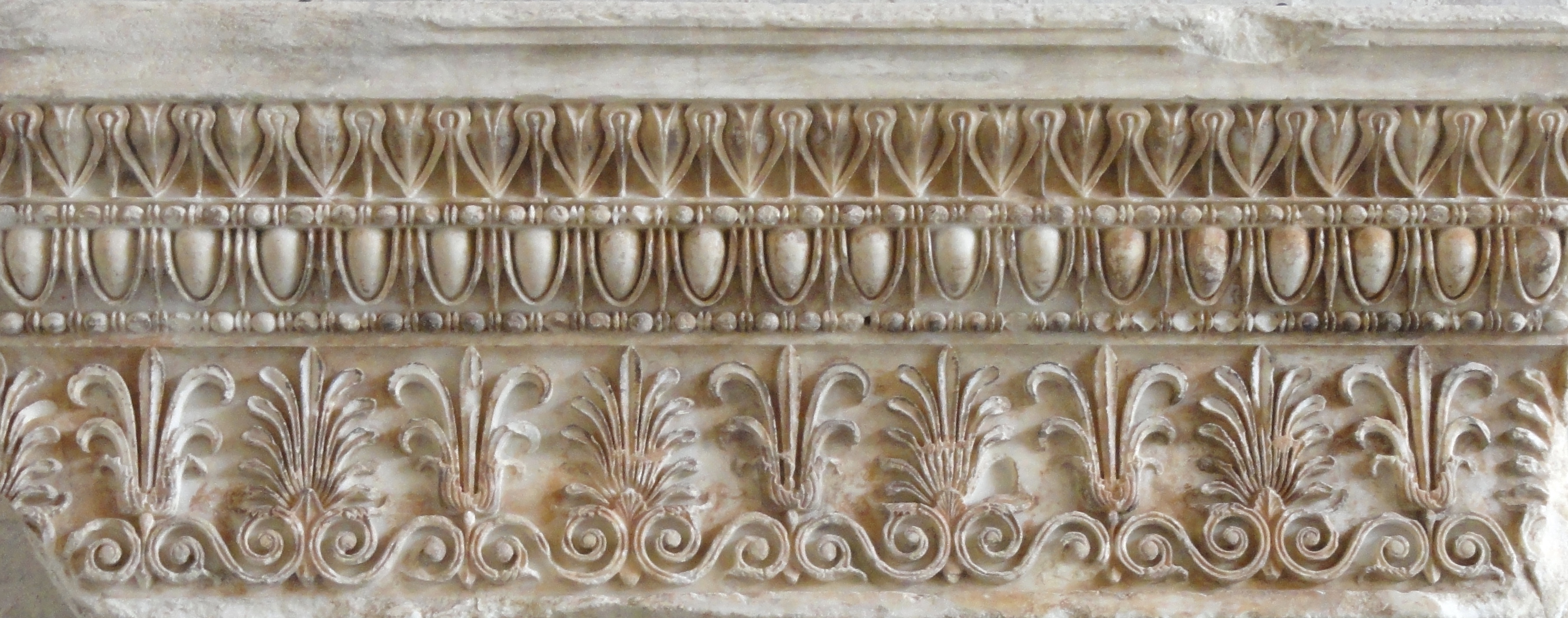
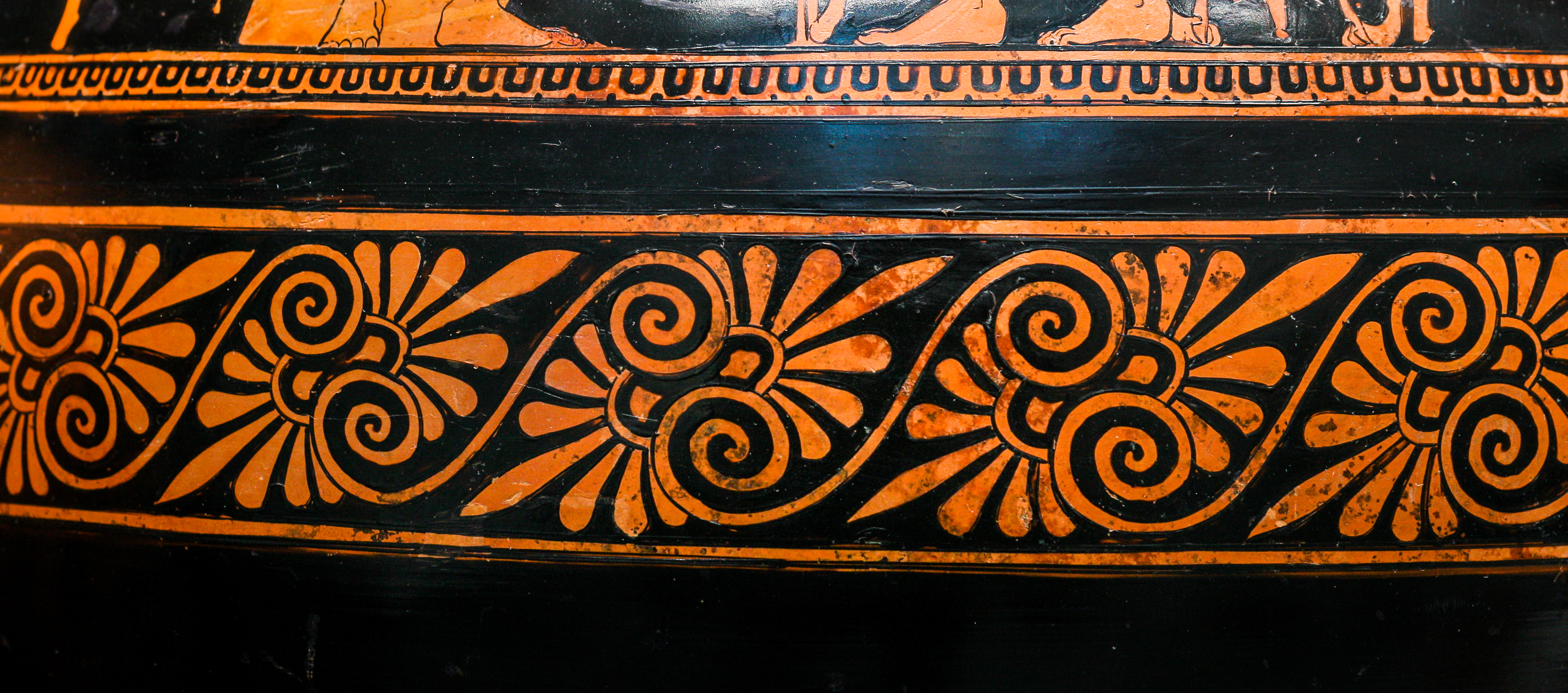
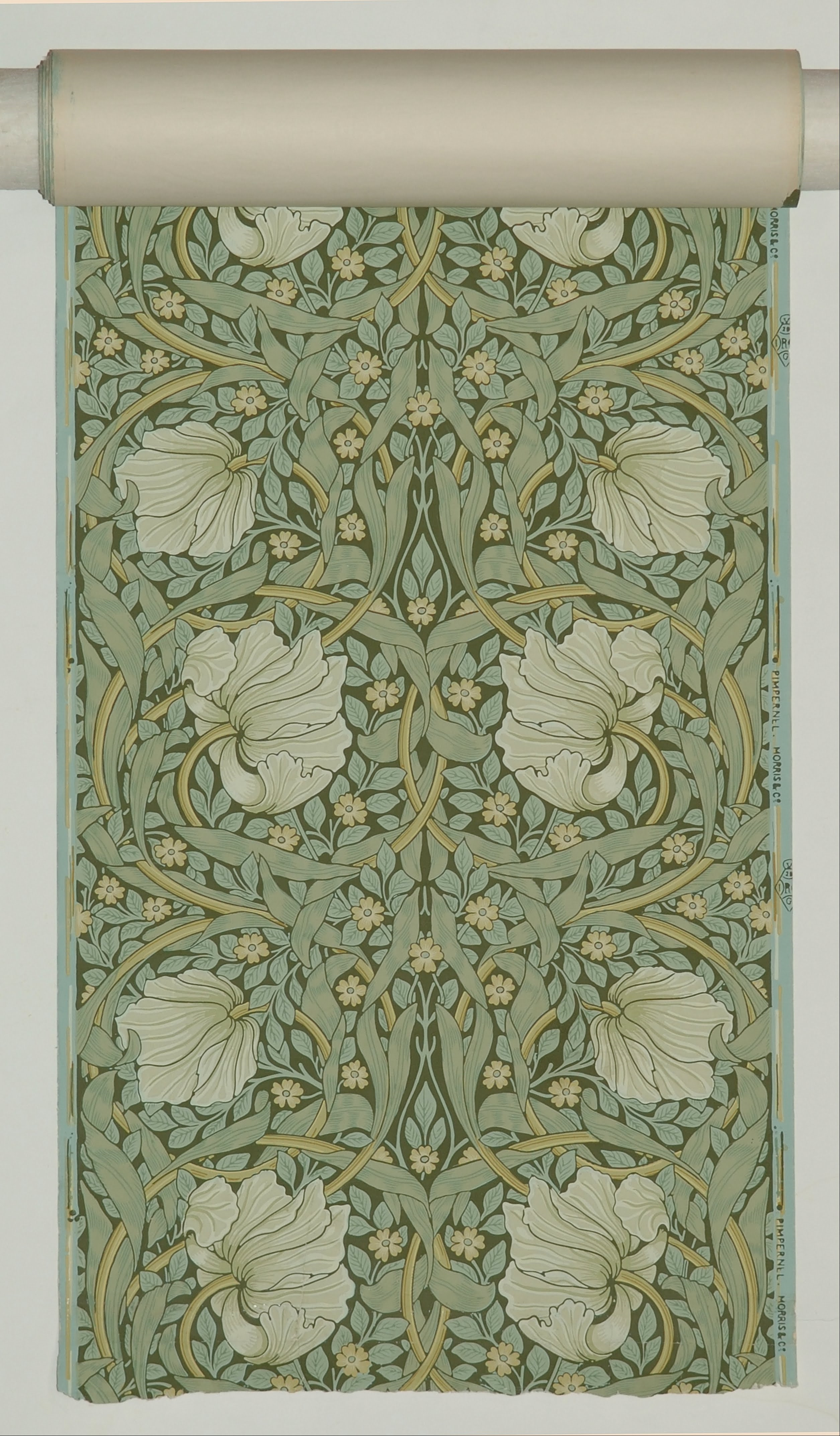
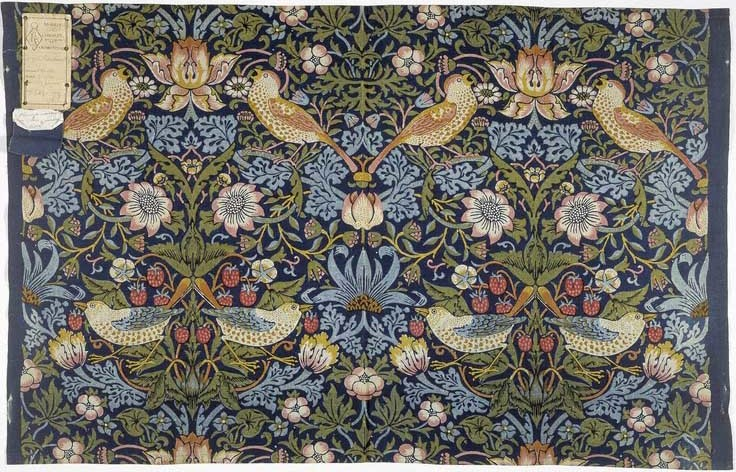
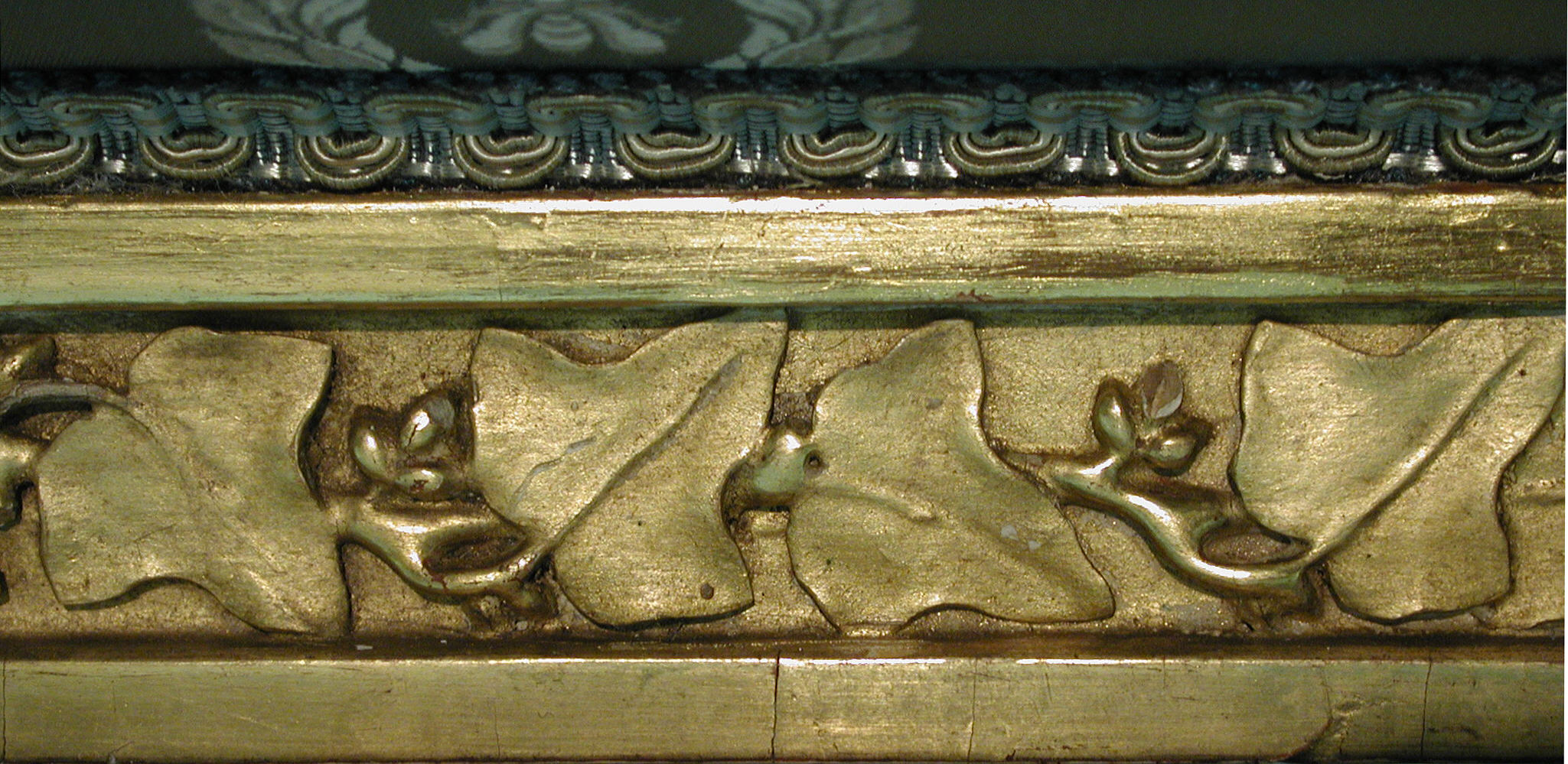
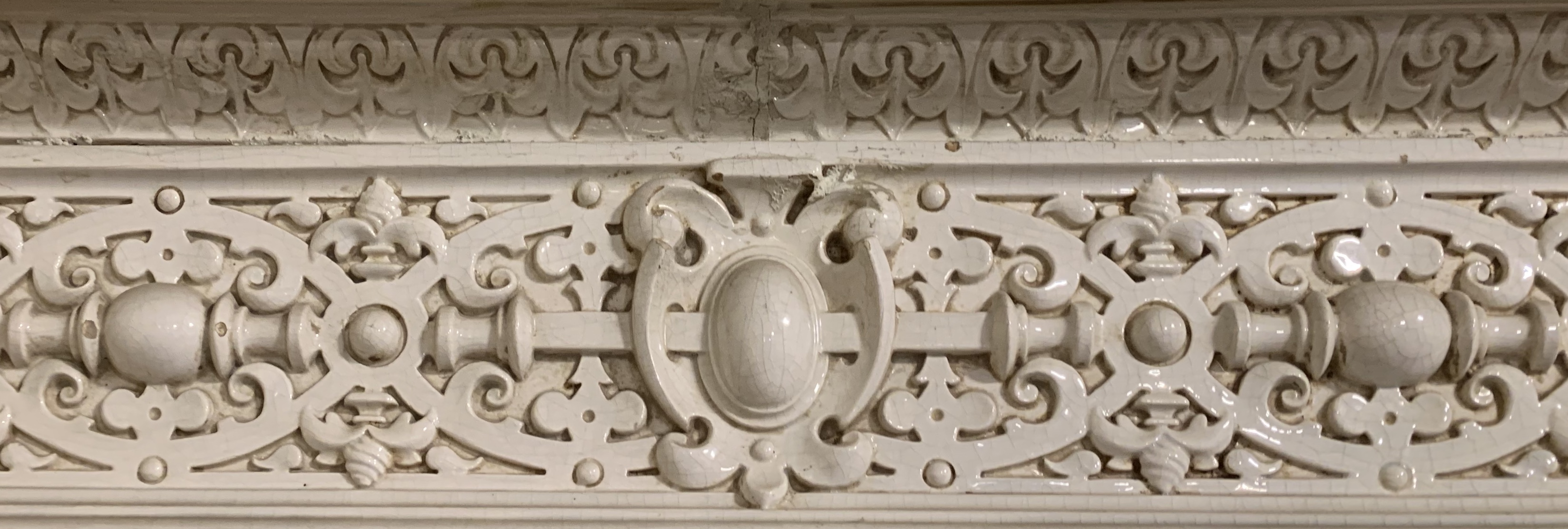
Various examples of patterns

A pattern is a regularity in the world, in human-made design, or in abstract ideas. As such, the elements of a pattern repeat in a predictable and logical manner. There exists countless kinds of unclassified patterns, present in everyday nature, fashion, many artistic areas, as well as a connection with mathematics. A geometric pattern is a type of pattern formed of repeating geometric shapes and typically repeated like a wallpaper design.

Any of the senses may directly observe patterns. Conversely, abstract patterns in science, mathematics, or language may be observable only by analysis. Direct observation in practice means seeing visual patterns, which are widespread in nature and in art. Visual patterns in nature are often chaotic, rarely exactly repeating, and often involve fractals. Natural patterns include spirals, meanders, waves, foams, tilings, cracks, and those created by symmetries of rotation and reflection. Patterns have an underlying mathematical structure; indeed, mathematics can be seen as the search for regularities, and the output of any function is a mathematical pattern. Similarly in the sciences, theories explain and predict regularities in the world.

In many areas of the decorative arts, from ceramics and textiles to wallpaper, "pattern" is used for an ornamental design that is manufactured, perhaps for many different shapes of object. In art and architecture, decorations or visual motifs may be combined and repeated to form patterns designed to have a chosen effect on the viewer.

== Nature ==
Nature provides examples of many kinds of pattern, including symmetries, trees and other structures with a fractal dimension, spirals, meanders, waves, foams, tilings, cracks and stripes.

=== Symmetry ===
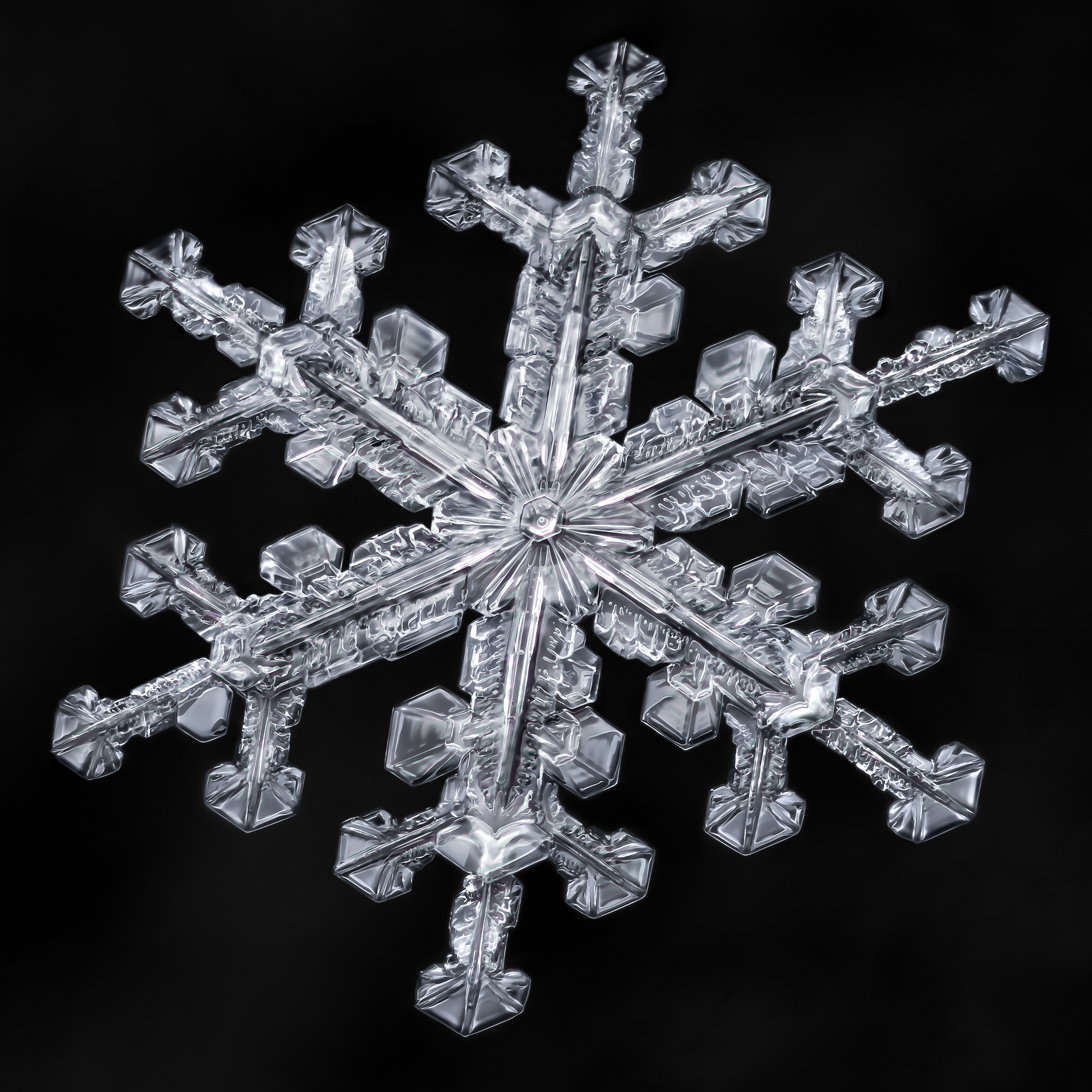
Snowflake sixfold symmetry

Symmetry is widespread in living things. Animals that move usually have bilateral or mirror symmetry as this favours movement. Plants often have radial or rotational symmetry, as do many flowers, as well as animals which are largely static as adults, such as sea anemones. Fivefold symmetry is found in the echinoderms, including starfish, sea urchins, and sea lilies.

Among non-living things, snowflakes have striking sixfold symmetry: each flake is unique, its structure recording the varying conditions during its crystallisation similarly on each of its six arms. Crystals have a highly specific set of possible crystal symmetries; they can be cubic or octahedral, but cannot have fivefold symmetry (unlike quasicrystals).

=== Spirals ===
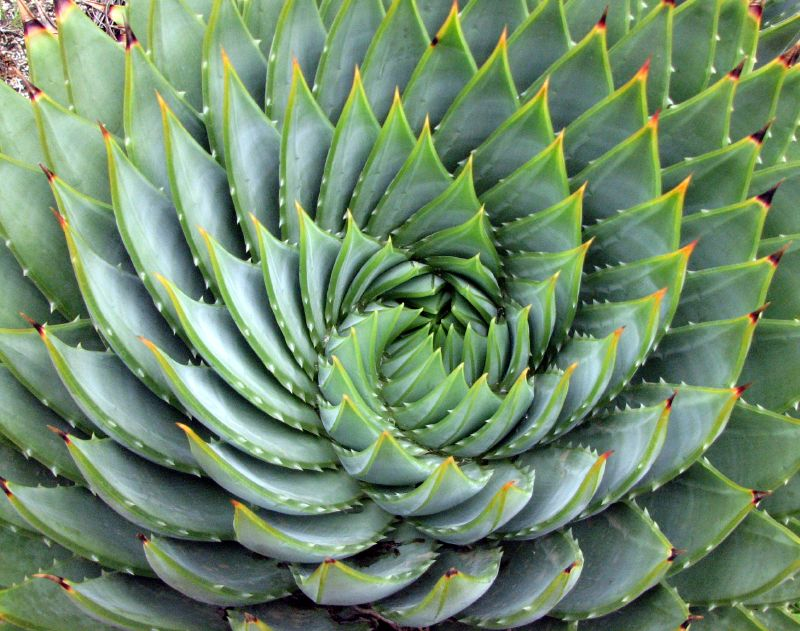
Aloe polyphylla phyllotaxis

Spiral patterns are found in the body plans of animals including molluscs such as the nautilus, and in the phyllotaxis of many plants, both of leaves spiralling around stems, and in the multiple spirals found in flowerheads such as the sunflower and fruit structures like the pineapple.

=== Chaos, turbulence, meanders and complexity ===
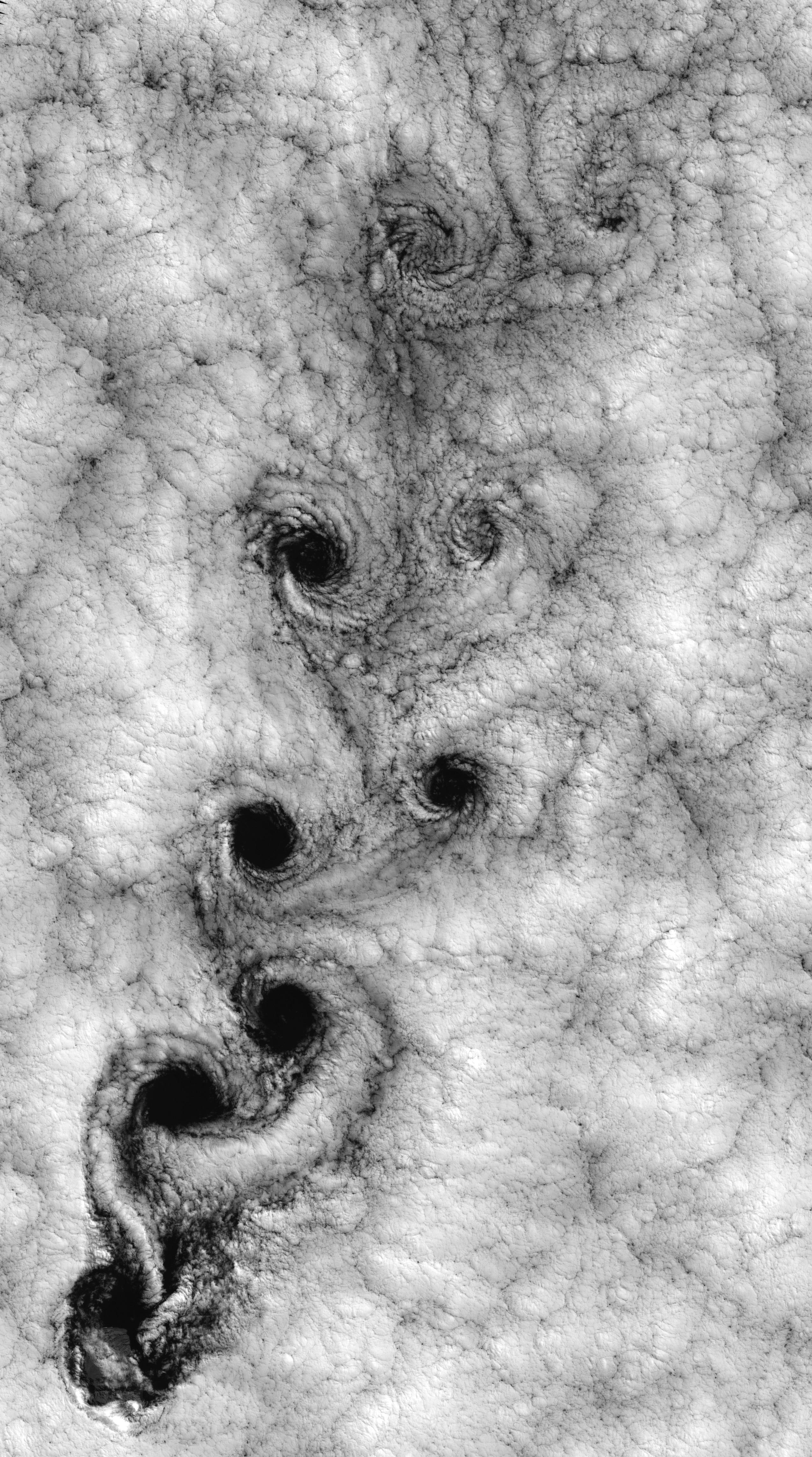
Vortex street turbulence

Chaos theory predicts that while the laws of physics are deterministic, there are events and patterns in nature that never exactly repeat because extremely small differences in starting conditions can lead to widely differing outcomes. The patterns in nature tend to be static due to dissipation on the emergence process, but when there is interplay between injection of energy and dissipation there can arise a complex dynamic. Many natural patterns are shaped by this complexity, including vortex streets, other effects of turbulent flow such as meanders in rivers. or nonlinear interaction of the system

=== Waves, dunes ===
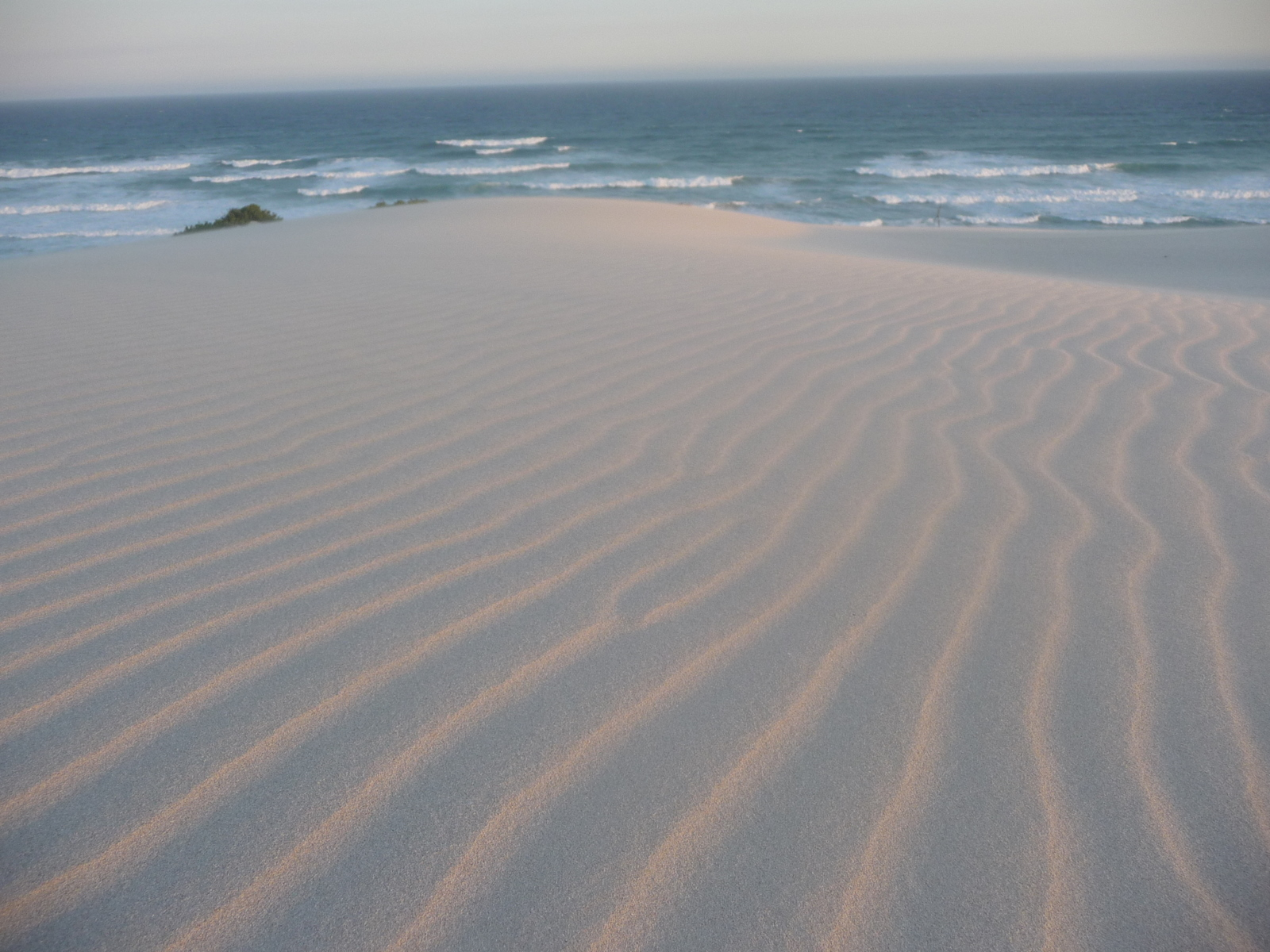
Dune ripple

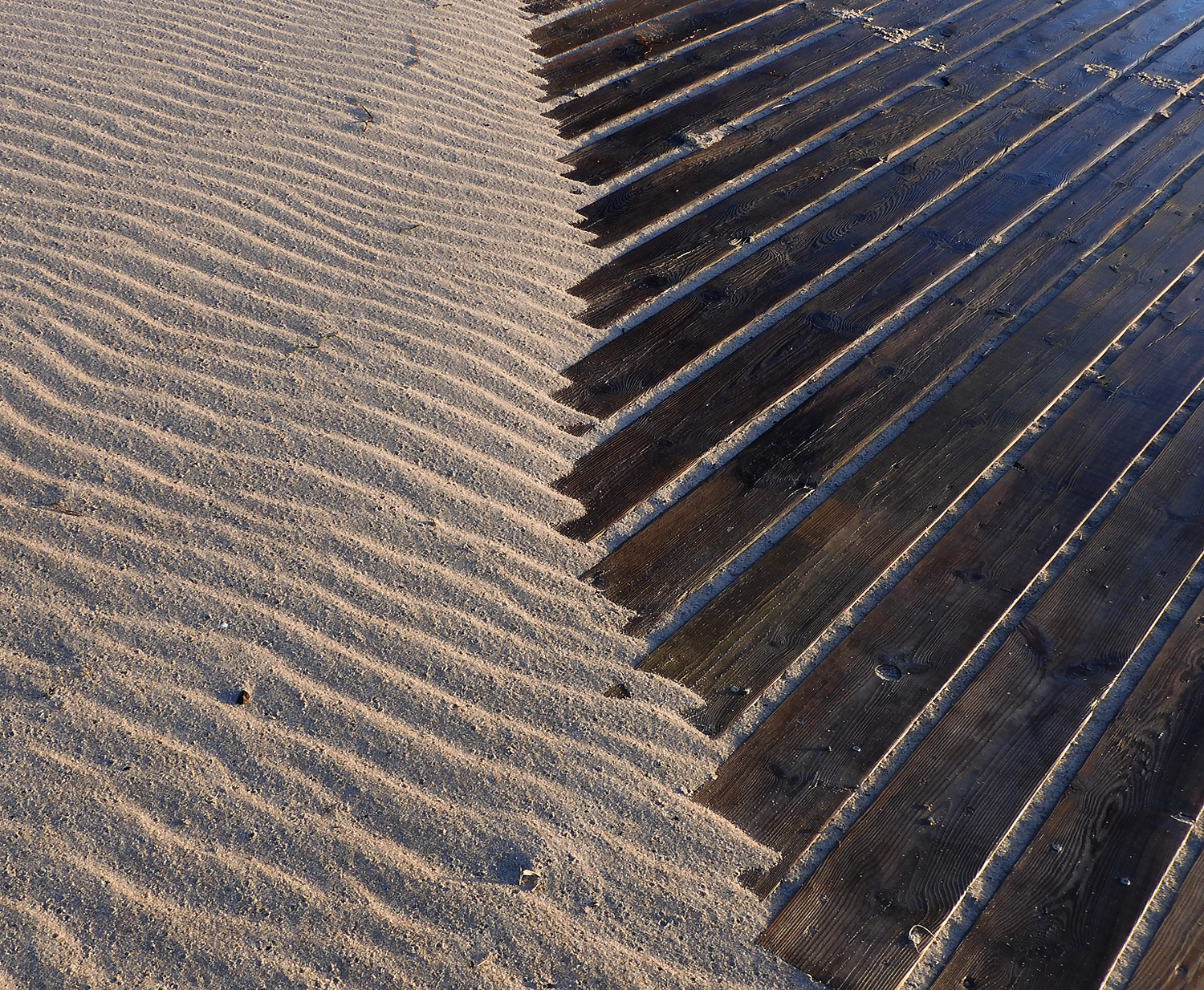
Dune ripples and boards form a symmetrical pattern.

Waves are disturbances that carry energy as they move. Mechanical waves propagate through a medium – air or water, making it oscillate as they pass by. Wind waves are surface waves that create the chaotic patterns of the sea. As they pass over sand, such waves create patterns of ripples; similarly, as the wind passes over sand, it creates patterns of dunes.

=== Bubbles, foam ===
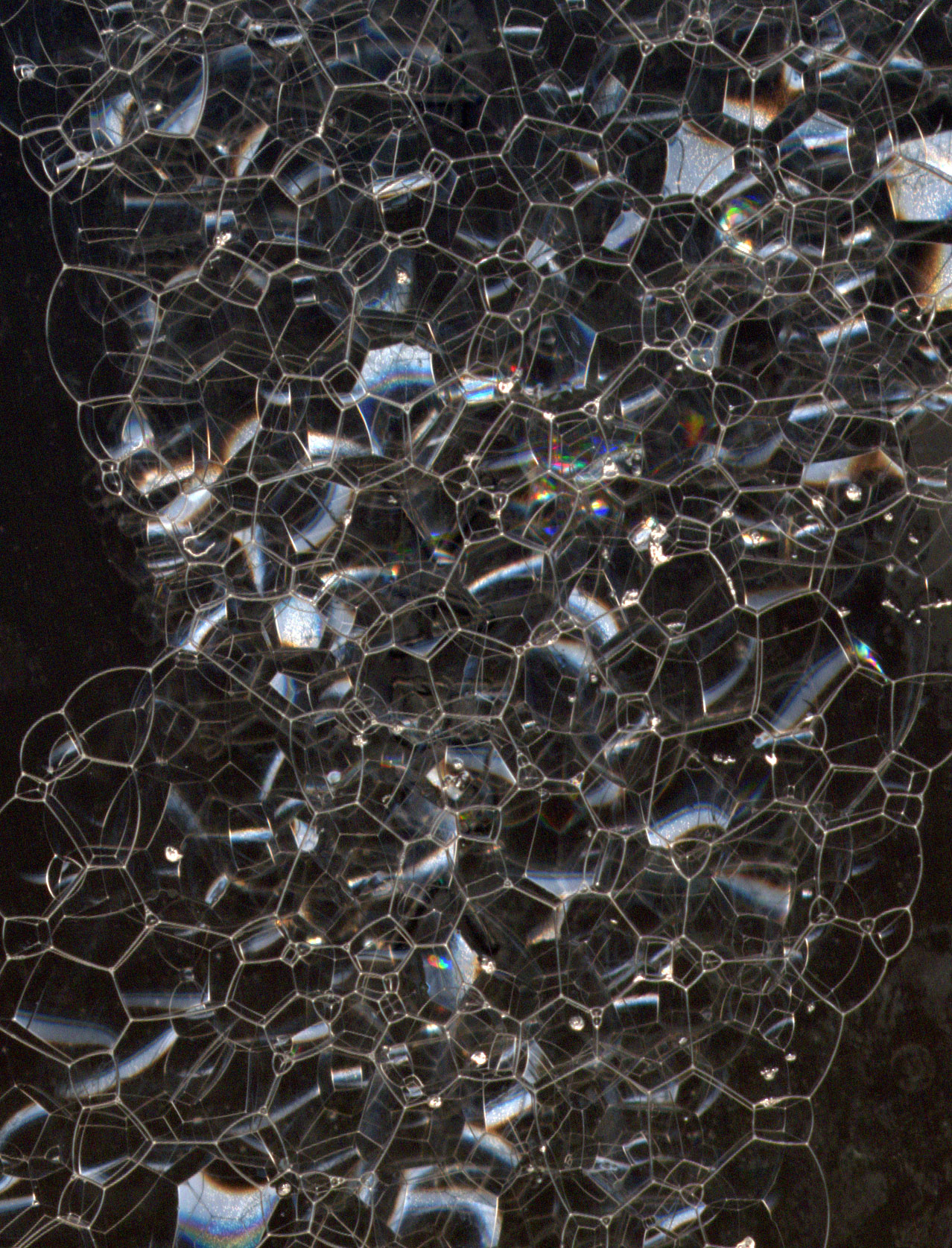
Foam of soap bubbles

Foams obey Plateau's laws, which require films to be smooth and continuous, and to have a constant average curvature. Foam and bubble patterns occur widely in nature, for example in radiolarians, sponge spicules, and the skeletons of silicoflagellates and sea urchins.

=== Cracks ===
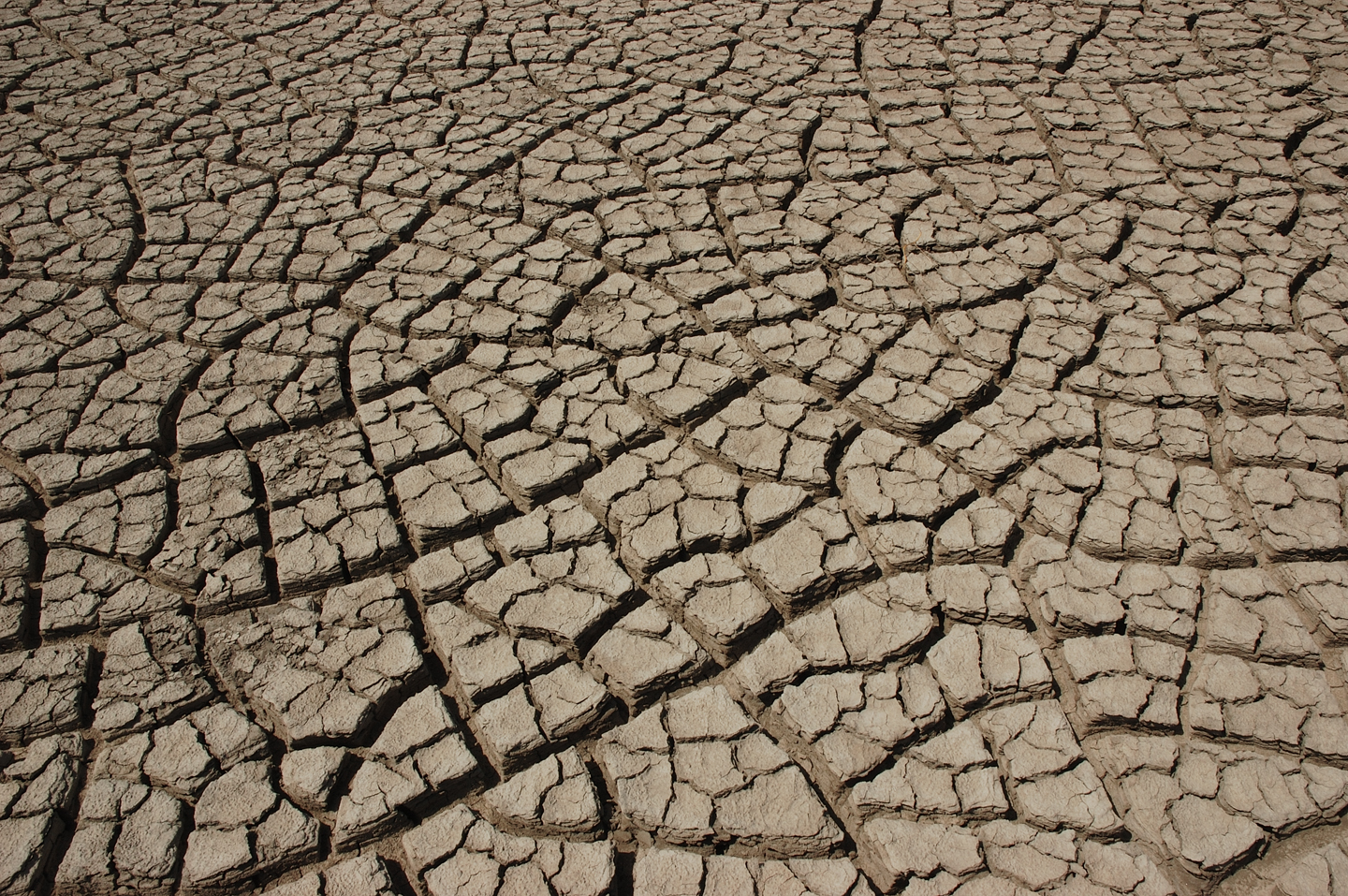
Shrinkage Cracks

Cracks form in materials to relieve stress: with 120 degree joints in elastic materials, but at 90 degrees in inelastic materials. Thus the pattern of cracks indicates whether the material is elastic or not. Cracking patterns are widespread in nature, for example in rocks, mud, tree bark and the glazes of old paintings and ceramics.

=== Spots, stripes ===
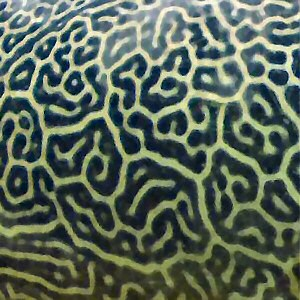
Mbu pufferfish skin

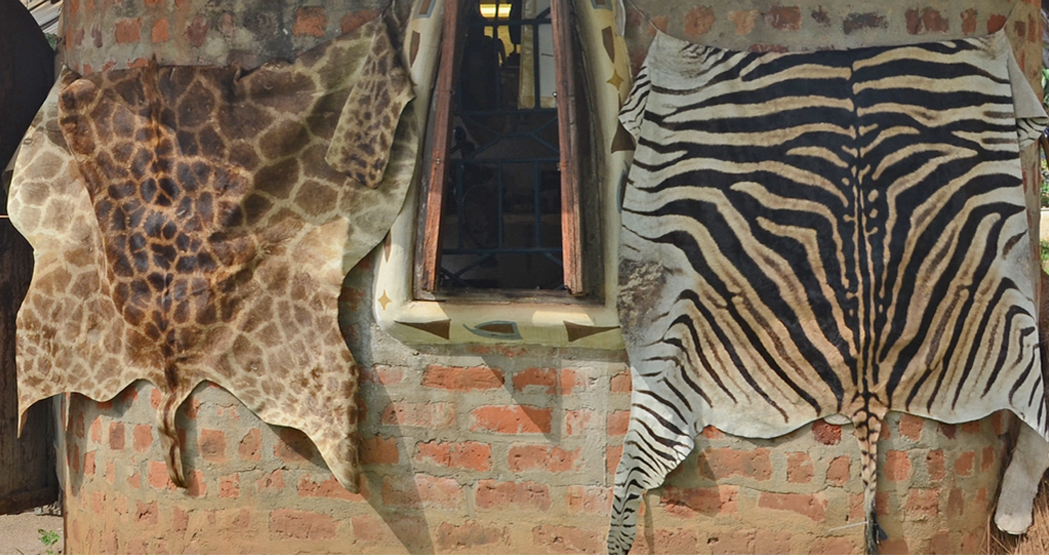
Skins of a South African giraffe and Burchell's zebra

Alan Turing, and later the mathematical biologist James D. Murray and other scientists, described a mechanism that spontaneously creates spotted or striped patterns, for example in the skin of mammals or the plumage of birds: a reaction–diffusion system involving two counter-acting chemical mechanisms, one that activates and one that inhibits a development, such as of dark pigment in the skin. These spatiotemporal patterns slowly drift, the animals' appearance changing imperceptibly as Turing predicted.

== Art and architecture ==
=== Tilings ===
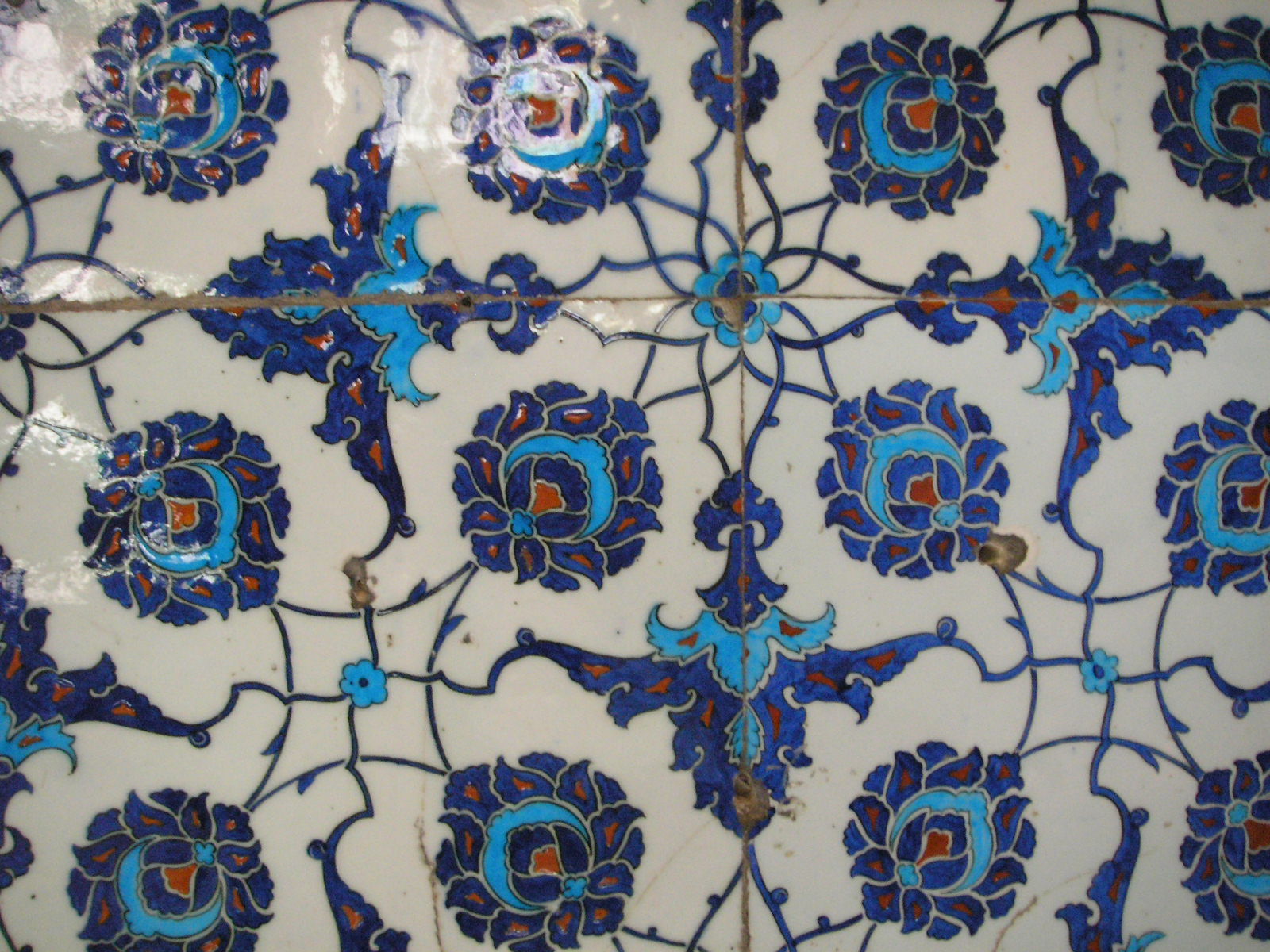
Elaborate ceramic tiles at Topkapi Palace

In visual art, pattern consists in regularity which in some way "organizes surfaces or structures in a consistent, regular manner." At its simplest, a pattern in art may be a geometric or other repeating shape in a painting, drawing, tapestry, ceramic tiling or carpet, but a pattern need not necessarily repeat exactly as long as it provides some form or organizing "skeleton" in the artwork. In mathematics, a tessellation is the tiling of a plane using one or more geometric shapes (which mathematicians call tiles), with no overlaps and no gaps.

=== In architecture ===
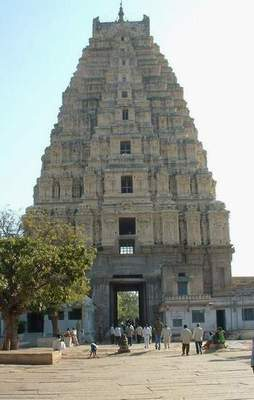
Patterns in architecture: the Virupaksha temple at Hampi has a fractal-like structure where the parts resemble the whole.

In architecture, motifs are repeated in various ways to form patterns. Most simply, structures such as windows can be repeated horizontally and vertically (see leading picture). Architects can use and repeat decorative and structural elements such as columns, pediments, and lintels. Repetitions need not be identical; for example, temples in South India have a roughly pyramidal form, where elements of the pattern repeat in a fractal-like way at different sizes.

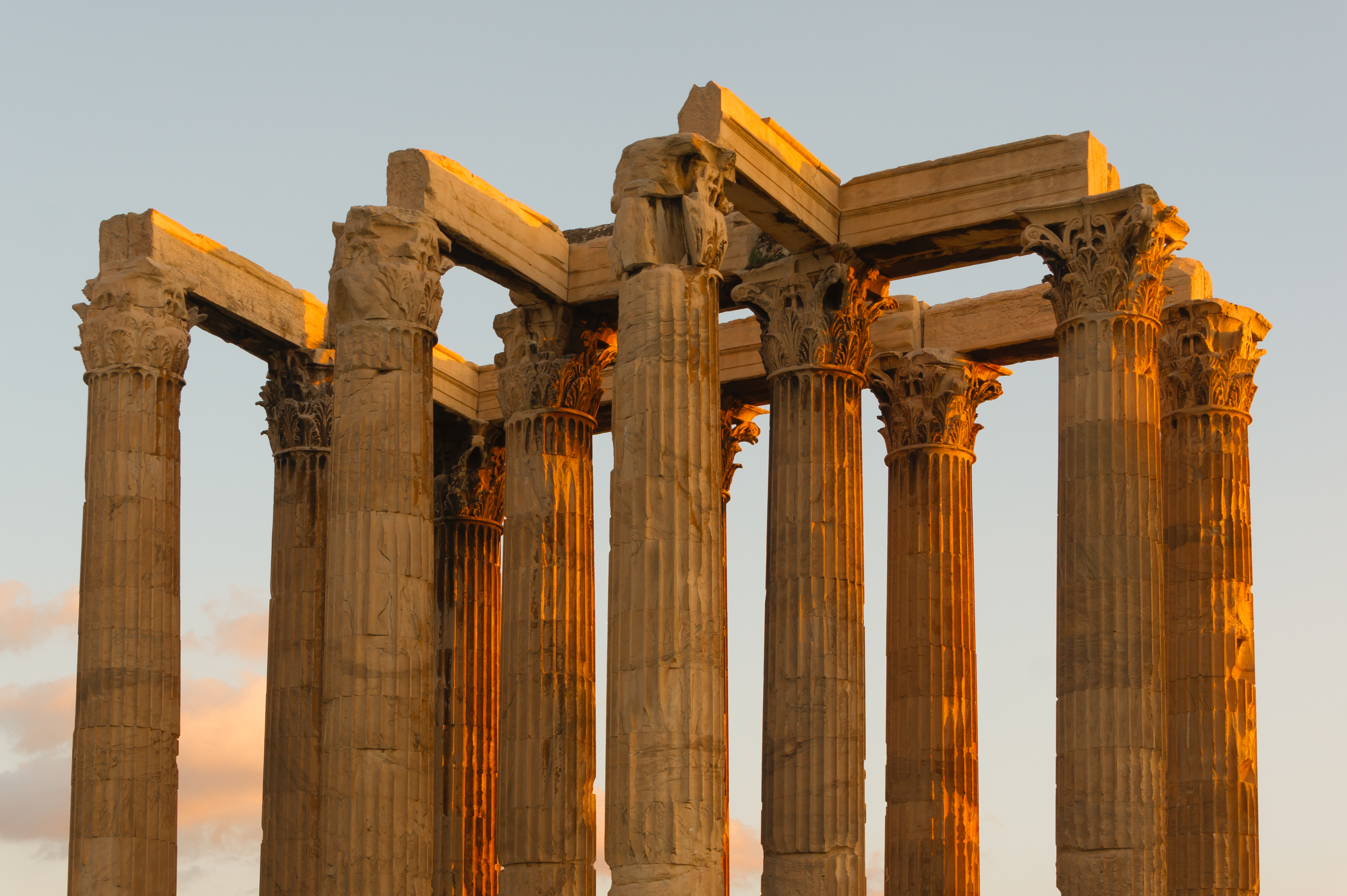
Patterns in Architecture: the columns of Zeus's temple in Athens

== Language and linguistics ==
Language provides researchers in linguistics with a wealth of patterns to investigate, and literary studies can investigate patterns in areas such as sound, grammar, motifs, metaphor, imagery, and narrative plot.

== Science and mathematics ==
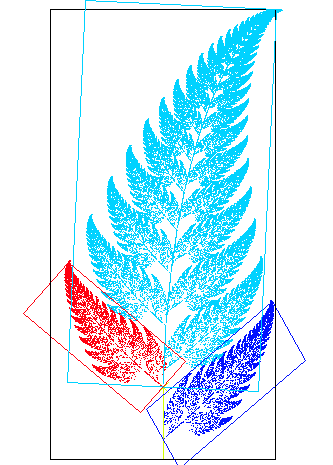
Fractal model of a fern illustrating self-similarity

Mathematics is sometimes called the "Science of Pattern", in the sense of rules that can be applied wherever needed. For example, any sequence of numbers that may be modeled by a mathematical function can be considered a pattern. Mathematics can be taught as a collection of patterns.

Gravity is a source of ubiquitous scientific patterns or patterns of observation. The rising and falling pattern of the sun each day results from the rotation of the earth while in orbit around the sun. Likewise, the moon's path through the sky is due to its orbit of the earth. These examples, while perhaps trivial, are examples of the "unreasonable effectiveness of mathematics" which obtain due to the differential equations whose application within physics function to describe the most general empirical patterns of the universe.

=== Real patterns ===
Daniel Dennett's notion of real patterns, discussed in his 1991 paper of the same name, provides an ontological framework aiming to discern the reality of patterns beyond mere human interpretation, by examining their predictive utility and the efficiency they provide in compressing information. For example, centre of gravity is a real pattern because it allows the prediction of the movements of a bodies such as the earth around the sun, and it compresses all the information about all the particles in the sun and the earth that allows scientists to make those predictions.

=== Fractals ===
Some mathematical rule-patterns can be visualised, and among these are those that explain patterns in nature including the mathematics of symmetry, waves, meanders, and fractals. Fractals are mathematical patterns that are scale-invariant. This means that the shape of the pattern does not depend on how closely you look at it. Self-similarity is found in fractals. Examples of natural fractals are coastlines and tree-shapes, which repeat their shape regardless of the magnification used by the viewer. While self-similar patterns can appear indefinitely complex, the rules needed to describe or produce their formation can be simple (e.g. Lindenmayer systems describing tree-shapes).

In pattern theory, devised by Ulf Grenander, mathematicians attempt to describe the world in terms of patterns. The goal is to lay out the world in a more computationally-friendly manner.

In the broadest sense, any regularity that can be explained by a scientific theory is a pattern. As in mathematics, science can be taught as a set of patterns.

A 2021 study, "Aesthetics and Psychological Effects of Fractal Based Design", suggested that

fractal patterns possess self-similar components that repeat at varying size scales. The perceptual experience of human-made environments can be impacted with inclusion of these natural patterns. Previous work has demonstrated consistent trends in preference for and complexity estimates of fractal patterns. However, limited information has been gathered on the impact of other visual judgments. Here we examine the aesthetic and perceptual experience of fractal 'global-forest' designs already installed in humanmade spaces and demonstrate how fractal pattern components are associated with positive psychological experiences that can be utilized to promote occupant wellbeing. These designs are composite fractal patterns consisting of individual fractal 'tree-seeds' which combine to create a 'global fractal forest.' The local 'tree-seed' patterns, global configuration of tree-seed locations, and overall resulting 'global-forest' patterns have fractal qualities. These designs span multiple mediums yet are all intended to lower occupant stress without detracting from the function and overall design of the space. In this series of studies, we first establish divergent relationships between various visual attributes, with pattern complexity, preference, and engagement ratings increasing with fractal complexity compared to ratings of refreshment and relaxation which stay the same or decrease with complexity. Subsequently, we determine that the local constituent fractal ('tree-seed') patterns contribute to the perception of the overall fractal design, and address how to balance aesthetic and psychological effects (such as individual experiences of perceived engagement and relaxation) in fractal design installations. This set of studies demonstrates that fractal preference is driven by a balance between increased arousal (desire for engagement and complexity) and decreased tension (desire for relaxation or refreshment). Installations of these composite mid-high complexity 'global-forest' patterns consisting of 'tree-seed' components balance these contrasting needs, and can serve as a practical implementation of biophilic patterns in human-made environments to promote occupant wellbeing.

== See also ==
- Archetype
- Cellular automata
- Die (manufacturing) (template)
- Form constant
- Pattern (casting)
- Pattern coin
- Pattern matching
- Pattern (sewing)
- Pattern recognition
- Pedagogical patterns
- Software design pattern
- Template method pattern

== Bibliography ==
=== In nature ===
- Adam, John A. Mathematics in Nature: Modeling Patterns in the Natural World. Princeton, 2006.
- Ball, Philip The Self-made Tapestry: Pattern Formation in Nature. Oxford, 2001.
- Edmaier, Bernhard Patterns of the Earth. Phaidon Press, 2007.
- Haeckel, Ernst Art Forms of Nature. Dover, 1974.
- Stevens, Peter S. Patterns in Nature. Penguin, 1974.
- Stewart, Ian. What Shape is a Snowflake? Magical Numbers in Nature. Weidenfeld & Nicolson, 2001.
- Thompson, D'Arcy W. On Growth and Form. 1942 2nd ed. (1st ed., 1917). ISBN 0-486-67135-6

=== In art and architecture ===
- Alexander, C. A Pattern Language: Towns, Buildings, Construction. Oxford, 1977.
- de Baeck, P. Patterns. Booqs, 2009.
- Garcia, M. The Patterns of Architecture. Wiley, 2009.
- Kiely, O. Pattern. Conran Octopus, 2010.
- Pritchard, S. V&A Pattern: The Fifties. V&A Publishing, 2009.

=== In science and mathematics ===
- Adam, J. A. Mathematics in Nature: Modeling Patterns in the Natural World. Princeton, 2006.
- Resnik, M. D. Mathematics as a Science of Patterns. Oxford, 1999.

=== In computing ===
- Gamma, E., Helm, R., Johnson, R., Vlissides, J. Design Patterns. Addison-Wesley, 1994.
- Bishop, C. M. Pattern Recognition and Machine Learning. Springer, 2007.
