= Lurdes Inoue =

Brazilian statistician

- Born: São Paulo, Brazil
- Education: University of São Paulo; Duke University
- Scientific career
- Fields: Biostatistics
- Thesis: Bayesian Design and Analysis of Clinical Experiments (1999)
- Doctoral advisor: Don Berry
- Doctoral students: Rebecca Hubbard

Lurdes Yoshiko Tani Inoue is a Brazilian-born statistician of Japanese descent, who specializes in Bayesian inference. She works as a professor of biostatistics in the University of Washington School of Public Health.

== Education and career ==
Inoue's grandparents emigrated from Japan to Brazil in the 1930s; she was born in São Paulo, where she grew up.

She earned bachelor's and master's degree from the University of São Paulo in 1992 and 1995, and received a fellowship from the Brazilian government to continue her studies in the US. She completed her Ph.D. in statistics in 1999 from Duke University, under the supervision of Don Berry.

After postdoctoral research at the University of Texas, she joined the University of Washington in 2002. In 2019, she became the chair of the biostatistics department.

== Book ==
With Giovanni Parmigiani, she is the author of the book Decision Theory: Principles and Approaches (Wiley, 2009). This book won the DeGroot Prize of the International Society for Bayesian Analysis for 2009.

== Recognition ==
In 2014, Inoue was elected as a Fellow of the American Statistical Association "for substantial and fundamental contributions to Bayesian decision theory and innovation in the statistical modeling of disease progression with applications to cancer research; for outstanding mentoring of junior researchers; and for exemplary service to the profession."
