= Rebecca Hubbard =

American biostatistician

Rebecca Allana Hubbard is an American biostatistician whose research interests include observational studies and the use of electronic health record data in public health analysis and decision-making, accounting for the errors in this type of data. She is a professor of biostatistics at the Brown University School of Public Health.

== Early life and education ==
Hubbard is African-American, and grew up in West Chester, Pennsylvania, where her parents had moved from farming communities in Delaware. She had a childhood love for science fiction and a talent for science and mathematics, and became the first person in her family to go to college.

She began her studies at the University of Pittsburgh in 1996, as a pre-med microbiology student, but shifted to ecology and evolution after finding herself uninterested in clinical work and clumsy at lab work. As an ecology student, she studied competition among plant species for openings in forest canopies. Her eventual interest in biostatistics began with a summer undergraduate research program directed by Louise M. Ryan at Harvard University. She graduated summa cum laude in 1999, and was awarded a Marshall Scholarship, which brought her to the University of Edinburgh for a master's degree in epidemiology in 2001, and a second master's degree in applied statistics at the University of Oxford in 2002. She returned to the US for a PhD in biostatistics at the University of Washington, completed in 2007. Her dissertation, Modeling a Non-Homogeneous Markov Process via Time Transformation, was supervised by Lurdes Inoue.

== Career ==
Hubbard worked in the National Alzheimer's Coordinating Center at the University of Washington from 2007 to 2008, and as a researcher at the Group Health Research Institute in Seattle (currently the Kaiser Permanente Washington Research Institute) from 2008 to 2014, while holding an affiliate faculty position at the University of Washington.

In 2014, she moved to the University of Pennsylvania as an associate professor of biostatistics, epidemiology, and informatics, where she was promoted to full professor in 2020. At the University of Pennsylvania, she served as deputy director of the division of biostatistics and a member of the Abramson Cancer Center. She chaired the Biometrics Section of the American Statistical Association in 2018.

Hubbard joined the faculty of the Brown University School of Public Health as a professor of biostatistics and data science in 2024.

== Recognition ==
Hubbard was elected as a Fellow of the American Statistical Association in 2019. In 2020, she was the co-winner (with Sherri Rose of Harvard) of the Health Policy Statistics Section Mid-Career Award of the American Statistical Association.

In June of 2023, Hubbard was also selected for the Gertrude Cox Award. Awarded by her alma mater, the University of Washington, the award recognizes up-and-coming statisticians who have made notable advances in the areas of biostatistics, statistical computing, and various other research fields.
