= Kevin Bubriski =

American documentary photographer

- Born: 1954 (age 71–72); North Adams, Massachusetts
- Education: Bowdoin College
- Occupation: Documentary photographer
- Website: kevinbubriski.com

Kevin Bubriski (born 1954) is an American documentary photographer.

== Life and career ==
Bubriski was born in North Adams, Massachusetts. He attended Bowdoin College in Brunswick, Maine, graduating in 1975. He worked as a photographer for nine years in Nepal and has also photographed trips to India, Tibet, Syria, Bangladesh, and within the United States. Bubriski lives in Vermont with his wife.

He has received fellowships from the Guggenheim Foundation, the National Endowment for the Arts, and the Asian Cultural Council. Kevin Bubriski has exhibited worldwide; his work can be found in the permanent collections of the Museum of Modern Art, The Metropolitan Museum of Art, and the International Center of Photography, all in New York, as well as the San Francisco Museum of Modern Art, the Yale University Art Gallery, the Center for Creative Photography in Tucson and the Bibliothèque Nationale de France in Paris. Kevin Bubriski's book, Portrait of Nepal, won the Golden Light Documentary Award in 1993 and his work has been featured in several publications, including the New York Times and the LA Times. In 2002, his work was included in a group exhibition about September 11 at the Library of Congress. Bubriski was a recipient of the 2004 Hasselblad Masters Award.

Bubriski was awarded the 2010-2011 Robert Gardner Visiting Artist Fellowship in Photography. An exhibit of Bubriski's work, entitled Shadows of Shangri La: Nepal in Photographs," was on display in Cambridge, Massachusetts from May to September 2014. The show was sponsored by Harvard University's Peabody Museum of Archaeology and Ethnology and the university's Asia Studies Center. Together the exhibit and its accompanying publication, Nepal: 1975–2011, "document the dramatic evolution of daily life in Nepal, from its years as a Hindu kingdom to what [Bubriski] calls 'the current precarious peace'." Over 2016-17, Bubriski was on a Senior Scholar Fulbright Fellowship in Nepal, where he conducted fine art photography in some of the remotest regions of Nepal and Tibet (China).

== Reception ==
Bubriski's exhibition "Shadows of Shangri La: Nepal in Photographs" and his book Nepal: 1975–2011 have been featured in the Boston Globe, New York Times, Nepali Times, ECS Nepal, Kathmandu Post, Asian Ethnology, Art New England, and Harvard Magazine. In his review for Asian Ethnology Niels Gutschow of Heidelberg University was able to "value Bubriski's work as a unique testimony that destroys any reproaches" for "Bubriski does not present clichés and he does not indulge the colonial gaze that tends to isolate the exotic." Bret Chenkin of Art New England critiques that "the earliest works appear stronger—have more visual dynamism and authenticity." Yet Chenkin appreciates the accessibility of the later images, explaining that "they bring a viewer sitting half the world away that much closer. Anyone who reads Bubriski's photographic journal will be satiated visually, artistically and culturally." Mark Feeney of the Boston Globe writes: "Bubriski's images convey a sense of Nepal that feels strong, full, and nuanced.

His book, Legacy in Stone: Syria Before War was featured in The Washington Post, The New York Review of Books, Roads and Kingdoms, and on public radio stations WBUR and VPR.

Our Voices, Our Streets: American Protests 2001-2011 was featured in The New York Review of Books, and in the Daily Beast.

The New Mexicans: 1981-83 was featured in Pasatiempo.

== Published works ==
- Portrait of Nepal (Chronicle Books, 1993)
- Power Places of Kathmandu (Inner Traditions, 1995)
- Pilgrimage: Looking at Ground Zero (Powerhouse Books, 2002)
- Michael Rockefeller: New Guinea Photographs, 1961 (Peabody Museum of Archaeology and Ethnology, 2007)
- Maobadi (Himal Books, 2011)
- Nepal: 1975–2011 (Radius Books & Peabody Museum, 2013)
- Look into My Eyes: Nuevomexicanos por Vida, '81-'83 (Museum of New Mexico Press, 2016)
- Kailash Yatra: a Long Walk to Mount Kailash through Humla, co-author Abhimanyu Pandey (Penguin, 2018)
- Mustang in Black and White, co-author Sienna Craig (Vajra Books, 2018)
- Legacy in Stone: Syria Before War (Powerhouse Books, 2019)
- Our Voices, Our Streets: American Protests 2001-2011, Forward: Lucy McKeon, Afterward: Howard Zinn (Powerhouse Books, 2020)
- Nepal Earthquake. Foreword: Manjushree Thapa (Himal Books, 2022)
- The Uyghurs: Kashgar before the Catastrophe. Text by Tahir Hamut Izgil and essay by Dru C. Gladney (George F. Thompson, 2023)
- The New Mexicans: 1981-83. Contribution by J. Matthew Martinez. Foreword by Bernard Plossu. (Museum of New Mexico Press, Santa Fe, New Mexico, 2024)
