= Giovanni Parmigiani =

Italian academic

- Education: B.S., Economics and Social Sciences; M.S., Statistics; Ph.D., Statistics
- Alma mater: Bocconi University; Carnegie-Mellon University
- Occupations: Statistician, academic and author
- Scientific career
- Workplaces: Duke University; Johns Hopkins University; Harvard University

Giovanni Parmigiani is an Italian statistician, academic, and author. He is a Professor in the Department of Data Science at the Dana Farber Cancer Institute and the department of Biostatistics at the Harvard T.H. Chan School of Public Health.

Parmigiani's research has contributed to a deeper understanding of inherited cancer risks, utilizing Bayesian modeling and machine learning to predict genetic susceptibility and integrate data on mutation effects. His scholarly work includes publications in journals such as Science, Journal of Clinical Oncology, and Clinical Infectious Diseases, as well as authorship of books, including Modeling in Medical Decision Making and Decision Theory: Principles and Approaches, for which he and co-author Lurdes Inoue received the DeGroot Prize. He also edited the volume The Analysis of Gene Expression Data: Methods and Software.

Parmigiani was named an Elected Fellow of the American Association for the Advancement of Science and a Fellow of the American Statistical Association. Among his other roles, he serves as a member of the Statistical Board of Reviewing Editors at Science. He also co-led BayesMendel, a software for developing statistical and machine learning models for cancer susceptibility genes, which include tools such as BRCAPRO, PANCPRO, MelaPRO, PancPRO, and co-led the development of its successor, Fam3PRO.

== Education and early career ==
Parmigiani graduated cum laude with a B.S. in Economics and Social Sciences from Università L. Bocconi in 1984 and served as a Fellow there from 1984 to 1986. He later earned his M.S. in Statistics in 1987 and his Ph.D. in Statistics in 1990 from Carnegie Mellon University. Following his Ph.D., he briefly worked as a Research Scientist at the same institution.

== Career ==
Parmigiani served as Assistant Professor in Statistics and Decision Sciences from 1991 to 1998 and held joint appointments in the Cancer Prevention, Detection, and Control Program and the Center for Clinical Health Policy Research between 1996 and 1999 at Duke University. Subsequently, he took on the role of Adjunct Associate Professor, which he held until 2003, and also assumed the position of Associate Professor at the same institution from 1998 to 1999. He also held several positions at the Johns Hopkins University. In 1999, he was appointed as an Associate Professor until 2005 and also held joint appointments in the Department of Pathology and the Department of Biostatistics from 2000 until 2009, as well as in the Division of Health Sciences Informatics between 2006 and 2009. Additionally, he also served as the Director of the Bioinformatics Shared Resource at the Kimmel Cancer Center from 2004 to 2009. During this time, he held the position of Professor from 2005 to 2009. Since then, he has continued his association with the Johns Hopkins University as an adjunct professor in the Department of Oncology.

Parmigiani served as a Visiting Assistant Professor at Harvard University in the fall of 1994. In 2009, he became the Chair of the Department of Biostatistics & Computational Biology and the Dana-Farber Cancer Institute, a role he held until 2018. Since 2009, he has also been a Professor at the Department of Data Science, Dana Farber Cancer Institute, Department of Biostatistics and T.H. Chan School of Public Health. He also served as the Program Leader of the Biostatistics and Computational Biology Program at the Dana-Farber/Harvard Cancer Center, and since 2010, he has served as the associate director for Population Sciences at Dana-Farber/Harvard Cancer Center.

== Works ==
Parmigiani's research has focused on statistical methods in cancer data analysis, contributing to a deeper understanding of inherited cancer risks and supporting informed decision-making. He was the statistical expert of the earliest comprehensive cancer genome sequencing projects, conducted in the Vogelstein / Kinzler / Velculescu lab at Johns Hopkins. Initially, they investigated consensus coding sequences in breast and colorectal cancers, identifying frequently mutated genes, with important implications for diagnosis and therapy. In collaboration with Laura D. Wood and others, he co-examined the genomic landscapes of various cancers, uncovering key mutations, enhancing the understanding of tumor heterogeneity, and identifying potential diagnostic targets. They also developed a patented method for mapping the genomic landscapes of breast and colorectal cancers, emphasized the role of these mutations in tumorigenesis, contributing to advancements in clinical applications. Additionally, his meta-analysis of BRCA1 and BRCA2 penetrance provided cancer risk estimates, clarifying risks for germline mutation carriers up to age 70, which aided genetic counseling and improved clinical management.

With the same group, Parmigiani co-identified recurrent IDH1 mutations through integrated genomic analysis of glioblastoma multiforme (GBM), highlighting their relevance to patient survival, classification, and potential targeted therapies. The same identified 12 core signaling pathways frequently altered by mutations in pancreatic cancer, underscoring their importance in the disease's pathogenesis. He co-invented a patented method that identified genetic alterations in pancreatic tumors, revealing a core set of dysregulated pathways responsible for pancreatic tumorigenesis, with implications for therapy. Furthermore, he co-discovered through exomic sequencing that PALB2 is a pancreatic cancer susceptibility gene, linking truncating mutations in this gene to hereditary cancer in multiple patients.

Among his other works, Parmigiani published a book titled Modeling in Medical Decision Making, in which he documented that simulation-based Bayesian methods offer a unified, practical framework for improving data-driven medical decision-making across various healthcare fields. He also co-edited a book titled The Analysis of Gene Expression Data: Methods and Software. Thomas Boyle from the University of Washington commented on the opening chapter of the book, terming it an "excellent overview of the field and the threads that make it up."

== Awards and honors ==
- 1999 – Fellow, American Statistical Association
- 2002 – Advising, Mentoring, and Teaching Recognition Award, Johns Hopkins School of Public Health Student Assembly
- 2009 – DeGroot Prize, The International Society for Bayesian Analysis
- 2016 – Junior Faculty Mentoring Award, Harvard T.H. Chan School of Public Health
- 2018 – Elected Fellow, American Association for the Advancement of Science
- 2020 – Casty Family Award, Dana Farber Cancer Institute
- 2022 – W. J. Youden Award in Interlaboratory Testing, American Statistical Association (ASA)

== Bibliography ==
=== Books ===
- Modeling in Medical Decision Making: A Bayesian Approach (2002) ISBN 9780471986089
- The Analysis of Gene Expression Data: Methods and Software (2003) ISBN 9780387216799
- Decision Theory: Principles and Approaches (2009) ISBN 9780471496571

=== Selected articles ===
- Sjoblom, T., Jones, S., Wood, L. D., Parsons, D. W., Lin, J., Barber, T. D., ... & Velculescu, V. E. (2006). The consensus coding sequences of human breast and colorectal cancers. Science, 314(5797), 268-274.
- Wood, L. D., Parsons, D. W., Jones, S., Lin, J., Sjoblom, T., Leary, R. J., ... & Vogelstein, B. (2007). The genomic landscapes of human breast and colorectal cancers. Science, 318(5853), 1108-1113.
- Chen, S., & Parmigiani, G. (2007). Meta-analysis of BRCA1 and BRCA2 penetrance. Journal of clinical oncology, 25(11), 1329-1333.
- Parsons, D. W., Jones, S., Zhang, X., Lin, J. C. H., Leary, R. J., Angenendt, P., ... & Kinzler, K. W. (2008). An integrated genomic analysis of human glioblastoma multiforme. Science, 321(5897), 1807-1812.
- Jones, S., Zhang, X., Parsons, D. W., Lin, J. C. H., Leary, R. J., Angenendt, P., ... & Kinzler, K. W. (2008). Core signaling pathways in human pancreatic cancers revealed by global genomic analyses. Science, 321(5897), 1801-1806.
