= Don Berry (statistician) =

American statistician (born 1940)

- Born: May 26, 1940 (age 86); Southbridge, Massachusetts
- Education: Yale University
- Scientific career
- Fields: Mathematics Statistics
- Workplaces: University of Minnesota; Duke University; University of Texas
- Thesis: A Bernoulli Two-Armed Bandit
- Doctoral advisor: Joseph B. Kadane; Leonard J. Savage
- Doctoral students: Lurdes Inoue

Donald Arthur Berry (born May 26, 1940) is an American statistician and a practitioner and proponent of Bayesian statistics in medical science. He was the chairman of the Department of Biostatistics and Applied Mathematics at the University of Texas M. D. Anderson Cancer Center from 1999-2010, where he played a role in the use of Bayesian methods to develop innovative, adaptive clinical trials. He is best known for the development of statistical theory relating to the design of clinical trials. He is a fellow of the American Statistical Association and the Institute of Mathematical Sciences. He founded Berry Consultants, a statistical consulting group, with Scott Berry in 2000.

== Biography ==
Berry was born in Southbridge, Massachusetts, in 1940, and obtained an A.B. in mathematics from Dartmouth College, before moving to Yale University where he received an M.A. and Ph.D. in statistics. Berry initially "flunked out" of his undergraduate education at Dartmouth and joined the army, being stationed in Panama, but at the request of his Dean he returned to Dartmouth to complete his undergraduate education in mathematics.
