= Sieve estimator =

In statistics, sieve estimators are a class of non-parametric estimators which use progressively more complex models to estimate an unknown high-dimensional function as more data becomes available, with the aim of asymptotically reducing error towards zero as the amount of data increases. This method is generally attributed to Ulf Grenander.

== Method of sieves in positron emission tomography ==
Sieve estimators have been used extensively for estimating density functions in high-dimensional spaces such as in Positron emission tomography (PET). The first exploitation of Sieves in PET for solving the maximum-likelihood image reconstruction problem was by Donald Snyder and Michael Miller, where they stabilized the time-of-flight PET problem originally solved by Shepp and Vardi. Shepp and Vardi's introduction of Maximum-likelihood estimators in emission tomography exploited the use of the Expectation-Maximization algorithm, which as it ascended towards the maximum-likelihood estimator developed a series of artifacts associated to the fact that the underlying emission density was of too high a dimension for any fixed sample size of Poisson measured counts. Grenander's method of sieves was used to stabilize the estimator, so that for any fixed sample size a resolution could be set which was consistent for the number of counts. As the observe PET imaging time would go to infinity, the dimension of the sieve would increase as well in such a manner that the density was appropriate for each sample size.

== See also ==
- Nonparametric regression
