= Bernhard Edmaier =

German geologist, photographer and author

Bernhard Edmaier is a German geologist, photographer and author of geoscientific books.

He is the main author of the illustrated book Earthsong (2005), in which he describes the Earth and its morphology from a new point of view based on pattern recognition and photographic art perspectives. The Earth's phenomena are described with respect to their genesis and to their appearance.

Edmaier studied civil engineering and geology before he switched to photography. When describing landscapes he works with aerial photographs, e.g. together with the science journalist and geologist Angelika Jung-Hüttl.

The work "Earthsong" is a spectacular collection of breathtaking aerial photographs of the Earth's surface and is divided into 4 chapters Aqua, Green, Desert and Barren. The photographs are accompanied by text and are taken all around the world from Alaska to the Bahamas and Iceland, and from continental Europe to North America and New Zealand.

== Bibliography ==
- Earthsong. Phaidon Press. 2004. ISBN 978-0714844510.
- Angelika Jung-Hüttl (text) (2007). Patterns Of The Earth. Phaidon Press. ISBN 978-0714846798. Archived from the original on 25 October 2013.
- Earth on Fire - How Volcanoes Shape Our Landscape. Phaidon Press. 2009. ISBN 978-0714857008.
