= Feinberg School of Medicine =

Medical school in Chicago, Illinois, US

Northwestern University Feinberg School of Medicine
- Former name: Northwestern University Medical School (1906–2002)
- Type: Private
- Established: 1859 (Lind University medical department); 1863 (Chicago Medical College); 1870 (affiliation with Northwestern); 1906 (Northwestern Medical School)
- Parent institution: Northwestern University
- Endowment: US$3.0 billion
- Dean: Eric G. Neilson
- Faculty: 4,830
- Students: 3,500 Total; 631 MD
- Postgraduates: 654 graduate professional/masters
- Doctoral students: 467 PhD
- Other students: 455 post-doctoral fellows 1,292 residents and fellows
- Location: Chicago, Illinois, U.S. 41.8963°N 87.6193°W
- Campus: Urban
- Website: feinberg.northwestern.edu

The Northwestern University Feinberg School of Medicine, formerly Northwestern University Medical School from 1906 to 2002, is the medical school of Northwestern University and located in the Streeterville neighborhood of Chicago, Illinois, United States. Founded in 1859, Feinberg offers a full-time Doctor of Medicine degree program, multiple dual degree programs, graduate medical education, and continuing medical education.

Through clinical affiliates Northwestern Memorial Hospital, the Ann & Robert H. Lurie Children's Hospital of Chicago, and the Shirley Ryan AbilityLab (formerly Rehabilitation Institute of Chicago), Feinberg and its clinical affiliates are together an $11 billion academic medical enterprise. The school has about 4,830 faculty members.

== Departments ==
Northwestern University Feinberg School of Medicine contains the following academic departments:

- Department of Anesthesiology
- Department of Biochemistry and Molecular Genetics (BMG)
- Department of Cell and Developmental Biology (CDB)
- Department of Dermatology
- Department of Emergency Medicine
- Department of Family and Community Medicine
- Department of Medical Education (DME)
- Department of Medical Social Sciences (MSS)
- Department of Medicine (DOM)
- Department of Microbiology-Immunology
- Department of Neurological Surgery
- Department of Neurology
- Department of Neuroscience
- Department of Obstetrics and Gynecology (OB-GYN)
- Department of Ophthalmology
- Department of Orthopaedic Surgery
- Department of Otolaryngology - Head and Neck Surgery
- Department of Pathology
- Department of Pediatrics
- Department of Pharmacology
- Department of Physical Medicine and Rehabilitation (PMR)
- Department of Physical Therapy and Human Movement Sciences (PTHMS)
- Department of Preventive Medicine
- Department of Psychiatry and Behavioral Sciences
- Department of Radiation Oncology
- Department of Radiology
- Department of Surgery
- Department of Urology

== Academic medical center ==
The Feinberg School of Medicine is part of the McGaw Medical Center of Northwestern University. Other McGaw members include:

- Ann & Robert H. Lurie Children's Hospital of Chicago
- Northwestern Memorial Hospital
- Shirley Ryan AbilityLab (formerly Rehabilitation Institute of Chicago)
- Jesse Brown VA Medical Center (formerly VA Chicago Health Care System)

Feinberg medical students and McGaw residents receive their clinical training at these hospitals, where nearly all the attending staff members have faculty appointments at the Feinberg School of Medicine. Residents also train at affiliates such as John H. Stroger Jr Hospital of Cook County, Northwestern Medicine Lake Forest Hospital, Swedish Covenant Hospital, MacNeal Hospital, and Methodist Hospital in Gary, Indiana.

The medical school's primary teaching hospital is Northwestern Memorial Hospital, a 2,200,000-square-foot (200,000 m^{2}) modern hospital that was completed in 1999.

== Education ==
The Feinberg School of Medicine is home to 631 medical students. The class of students who graduated in 2023 are the 164th graduating class. For the 2023 entering class, 7,836 people applied for 145 seats. The median undergraduate GPA and MCAT score for successful applicants are 3.92 and 520, respectively.

For medical students, the school offers four-year dual degree programs, which combine the Doctor of Medicine (MD) degree with a Master of Public Health (MPH), a Master of Arts in Medical Humanities and Bioethics (MA), a Master of Science in Healthcare Quality and Patient Safety (MS), or a Master of Business Administration (MBA). Students electing to pursue the additional degrees enroll in evening classes and graduate with both degrees. Two MD/PhD programs are offered, one in combination with Northwestern University's Graduate School (Medical Scientist Training Program) and one with the university's Institute for Neuroscience.

The school also offers graduate degree programs, some in combination with other Northwestern University professional schools:

- Doctor of Philosophy (PhD) in basic science programs such as Biological Sciences and Clinical Psychology, and public health programs such as Health and Biomedical Informatics, Health Services and Outcomes Research, Epidemiology, and Translational Outcomes Science
- Doctor of Physical Therapy (DPT)
- Master of Medical Science (MMSc) in Physician Assistant Studies
- Master of Public Health (MPH)
- Master of Science (MS) in programs such as Epidemiology, Biostatistics, Science in Health Services and Outcomes Research, Clinical Investigation, Genetic Counseling, or Regulatory Compliance.
- Master of Medical Informatics (MMI)
- Master of Prosthetics and Orthotics (MPO)

== Research ==
According to public financial data for Feinberg, support for competitive research grants from all external sources totaled $706 million in academic year 2022–2023. In 2022, Feinberg ranked 15th for NIH funding among American medical schools. The medical school houses more than 35 Core Facilities, including a Bioinformatics Consulting Core, Genomics Core and Human Embryonic and Induced Pluripotent Stem Cell Core.

Faculty in the Research program at Feinberg study and mentor in a range of areas, including cancer biology, cell biology, chemical biology, drug discovery, developmental biology, evolutionary biology, genetics, genomics, medical biology, immunology, microbial pathogenesis, neuroscience, pharmacology, structural biology, biochemistry, epigenetics, epidemiology, behavioral sciences, preventive medicine, epidemiology, health outcomes, quality improvement, and translational sciences.

=== Recent growth ===
In June 2019, the university opened a $560 million, 625,000 square-foot biomedical research building on the Chicago campus. The new building, the Louis A. Simpson and Kimberly K. Querrey Biomedical Research Center, is connected to the existing Robert H. Lurie Medical Research Center. A second phase of build out will eventually total 1.2 million square feet in the new building when complete. Additionally, more than 250,000 square feet of space in existing campus buildings has been converted to new laboratory space.

=== Nobel laureates ===
- John Eccles, an Australian neurophysiologist and philosopher, received the 1963 Nobel Prize in Physiology or Medicine with Andrew Huxley and Alan Lloyd Hodgkin for their fundamental work on the synapse. Eccles was a professor at Feinberg from 1966 to 1968.
- Robert Furchgott, a graduate of the class of 1940, received the Nobel Prize in Physiology or Medicine in 1998 for his co-discovery of the role of nitric oxide as a signaling molecule.
- Ferid Murad, an American pharmacologist and cell biologist, received the Nobel Prize in Physiology or Medicine in 1998, along with Robert F. Furchgott and Louis J. Ignarro, for demonstrating that nitroglycerin and related drugs worked by releasing nitric oxide into the body, which relaxed smooth muscle by elevating intracellular cyclic GMP. Murad was an adjunct professor at Feinberg from 1988 to 1998.

== Rankings ==
In 2024, U.S. News & World Report ranked Feinberg in Tier 1 for Best Medical Schools:Research. In the year prior, Feinberg had been ranked 13th among American medical research schools. The school is ranked 15th in the National Institutes of Health funding rankings among all American Medical Schools.

The school's major affiliated teaching hospitals rank in U.S. News & World Report's Best Hospitals 2023 and 2024 as follows:

- Shirley Ryan AbilityLab, ranked first in the nation for physical medicine and rehabilitation hospitals
- Northwestern Memorial Hospital, 2024 Honor Roll
- Ann & Robert H. Lurie Children's Hospital of Chicago, nationally ranked in 10 specialties

== History ==
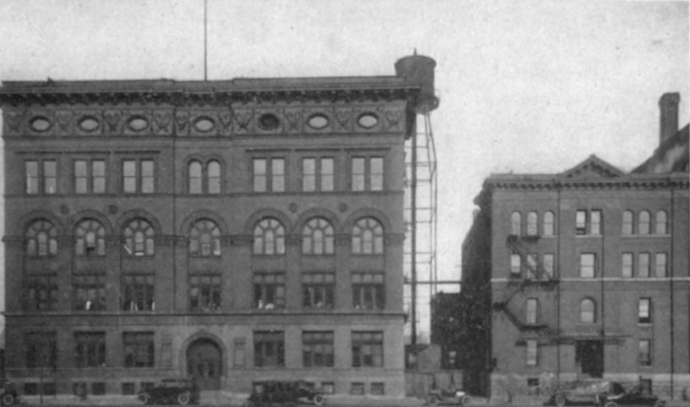
Northwestern University Medical School building at 2421 South Dearborn Street in 1922

Hosmer Johnson, Nathan Smith Davis, Ralph Isham, Edmund Andrews, David Rutter and William Byford co-founded the medical department of Lind University on October 11, 1859. It was renamed the Chicago Medical College in 1863, and affiliated with Northwestern University in 1870.

The Woman's Medical College of Chicago, established in 1870 as the Woman's Hospital Medical College, became affiliated with Northwestern in 1892 as the Northwestern University Woman's Medical School. The college closed in 1902 as other schools in Chicago and the nation began accepting women.

In 1906, Chicago Medical College was renamed Northwestern University Medical School. It had occupied buildings on the near south side of Chicago from 1863 until the Montgomery Ward Memorial Building was constructed in Streeterville in 1926.

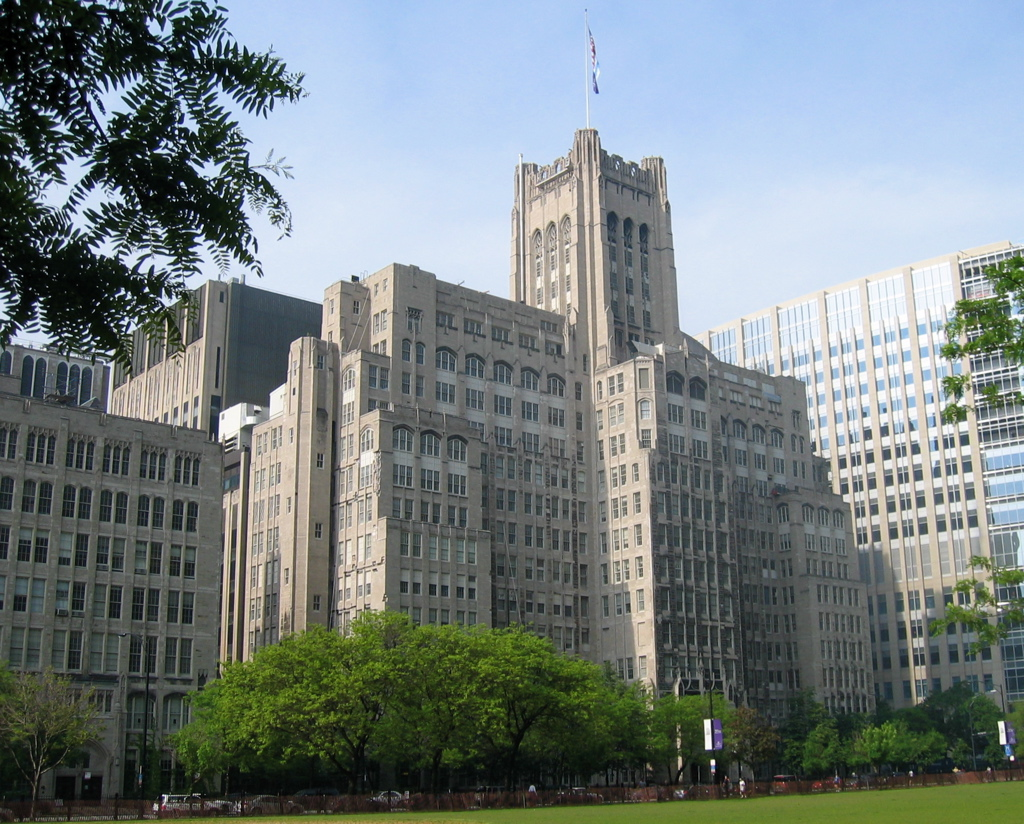
The Montgomery Ward Memorial building at the Feinberg School of Medicine

Northwestern University Medical School was renamed the Feinberg School of Medicine in 2002, reflecting a $75 million donation from the Joseph and Bessie Feinberg Foundation. Reuben Feinberg started to donate to the university after being hospitalized at Northwestern Memorial Hospital for a heart attack. The first donation, in 1988, was for $17 million to establish the Feinberg Cardiovascular Research Institute. A $10 million donation was subsequently sent in 1996 to establish the Frances Evelyn Feinberg Clinical Neurosciences Institute.

In 2012, Feinberg's entering medical students began a new curriculum, organized into three phases and emphasizing integration of four main curricular elements: science in medicine, clinical medicine, health & society, and professional development. The goal was to build a more learner-centered educational program that (1) fully integrates scientific principles in a clinical context; (2) stimulates inquiry and investigation; (3) has an assessment system that comprehensively evaluates student achievement in each of the core competencies; (4) reinforces a culture of learning, teamwork, and excellence; (5) is flexible and able to meet the unique needs of individual students as they learn and differentiate.

On September 1, 2013, Northwestern Medical Faculty Foundation, the medical school's physician's group, joined Northwestern Memorial HealthCare (NMHC), the health system that includes Northwestern Memorial Hospital, forming a new physician's group called Northwestern Medical Group. Together, NMHC and Feinberg jointly share the brand "Northwestern Medicine."

On May 8, 2015, exactly 90 years after Northwestern University first broke ground on its Chicago campus, Feinberg broke ground on the Louis A. Simpson and Kimberly K. Querrey Biomedical Research Center. The building opened in June 2019 and added more than 625,000 square feet and 12 stories of research space to the downtown campus.

== Notable alumni ==
- Nicholas Senn, Class of 1868, an early surgeon-scientist and founder of the Association of Military Surgeons of the United States. He was a former president of the American Medical Association in 1897.
- Mary Harris Thompson, Class of 1870, ad eundem, first female surgeon in Chicago and first female surgeon at Cook County Hospital. Founder of the Mary Thompson Hospital
- Sarah Hackett Stevenson, Class of 1874, the first female member of the American Medical Association (AMA), head of the Illinois State Medical Society's committee on progress in physiology, and a leader and advocate for the emancipation of women and for the equal treatment of men and women.
- Roswell Park, Class of 1876, surgeon for whom Roswell Park Comprehensive Cancer Center in Buffalo, New York, is named
- Franklin H. Martin, Class of 1880, former Director-General of the American College of Surgeons and founding editor of Surgery, Gynecology, and Obstetrics
- John Addison Fordyce, Class of 1881, American dermatologist whose name is associated with Fordyce's spot, Angiokeratoma of Fordyce, Brooke–Fordyce trichoepithelioma, Fordyce's disease, Fordyce's lesion, and Fox–Fordyce disease
- Daniel Hale Williams, Class of 1883, performed the first successful pericardial heart surgery in America; only African-American charter member of the American College of Surgeons
- Charles Horace Mayo, Class of 1888, founder of Mayo Clinic
- Carlos Montezuma, Class of 1889, one of the first Native Americans to receive a Doctor of Medicine degree from any school, and founder of the Society of American Indians
- Joseph Bolivar DeLee, Class of 1891, an American physician who became known as the father of modern obstetrics. DeLee founded the Chicago Lying-in Hospital, where he introduced the first portable infant incubator.
- Anne Hazen McFarland, Class of 1891 Woman's Medical College, physician specializing in neurology, medical journal editor
- Isaac Arthur Abt, Class of 1891, among the first American physicians to specialize in pediatrics, author of the major pediatric textbook of the first decades of the 20th century
- Anna L. Brown, Class of 1892 or 1894, Canadian-born American physician, one of the leading authorities on the health for girls in the U.S.
- George E. Hoyt, Class of 1892, member of the Wisconsin State Assembly and the Wisconsin State Senate
- George Jewett, Class of 1893, first African-American medical student who simultaneously played collegiate football in the Big 10. In his honor, the George Jewett Trophy is a rivalry trophy awarded each time Northwestern plays Michigan in football.
- A. Wilberforce Williams, class of 1894, African American doctor and journalist
- Emma Ann Reynolds, Class of 1895, superintendent of training at Provident Hospital Training School for Nurses, physician in residence at Paul Quinn College, and the first African American woman to receive a Doctor of Medicine degree from Northwestern University
- Howard T. Ricketts, Class of 1897, discovered bacteria of the genus Rickettsia, and identified the cause and methods of transmission of rocky mountain spotted fever
- Henry Stanley Plummer, Class of 1898, internist, endocrinologist and one of the founding partners of the Mayo Clinic. Considered to be the architect of the modern medical practice. The Plummer Building on the Mayo Clinic campus was named after him, as were Plummer-Vinson Syndrome and Plummer's nails.
- Allen B. Kanavel, Class of 1899, founder, regent, and president of the American College of Surgeons, internationally recognized as founder of modern hand and peripheral nerve surgery
- Julius Hess, Class of 1899, a pediatrician considered the father of American neonatology. In 1922, he published the first textbook on prematurity and birth defects, and started the first premature infant station in the United States.
- Clifford G. Grulee, class of 1903, a pediatrician and founding member of the American Academy of Pediatrics
- Arthur John Booker, class of 1906, military physician, community activist and health advocate
- Loyal E. Davis, Class of 1918, American neurosurgeon, Chairman of the Department of Surgery at Northwestern University Medical School, President of the American College of Surgeons, and adoptive father of former First Lady of the United States Nancy Reagan
- Theodore K. Lawless, Class of 1919, African-American dermatologist and philanthropist; advanced the treatment of leprosy and syphilis
- Arthur Falls, Class of 1925, African-American physician and activist who played a major role in desegregation of Chicago's health facilities
- Alfred Bitini Xuma, Class of 1926, surgeon in Johannesburg and later president (1940–1949) of the African National Congress, preceding Nelson Mandela. The first black South African to graduate from the London School of Hygiene & Tropical Medicine (1932)
- William F. Windle, Class of 1926, 1968 winner of the Albert Lasker Basic Medical Research Award for work on brain development and injury
- Eric Oldberg, Class of 1927, neurosurgeon, co-discoverer of cholecystokinin, director of neurological surgery at the University of Illinois School of Medicine (1936–1971), director of the Chicago Board of Health (1960–1979)
- J. Roscoe Miller, Class of 1930, president, Northwestern University 1949–1969; dean, Northwestern University Medical School, 1941–1949
- William S. Kroger, Class of 1931, pioneer in the use of hypnosis in medicine and co-founder and founder of medical societies and academies dedicated to furthering psychosomatic medicine and medical hypnosis.
- Kenneth Gieser, Class of 1934, co-founder of the Christian Medical Society, now Christian Medical and Dental Associations.
- Roger W. Robinson, Class of 1935, a cardiologist who recognized the role of cholesterol and diet in atherosclerotic heart disease and later demonstrated that heparin prevents arterial clots.
- Clara Raven, Class of 1938, American physician
- John Patrick Spiegel, Class of 1939, American psychiatrist, and expert on violence and combat stress and the 103rd president of the American Psychiatric Association.
- Robert F. Furchgott, Class of 1940, 1998 Nobel Prize in Physiology or Medicine for his co-discovery of nitric oxide
- Cheddi Jagan, Class of 1946: President of Guyana from 1992 to 1997
- Arthur DeBoer, class of 1946, American cardiologist and first in Chicago to use cardiopulmonary bypass in heart surgery
- Ralph Paffenbarger, Class of 1947, epidemiologist, leader of the College Alumni Health Study in the 1960s, which established the health benefits of exercise, considered the father of the modern fitness movement
- Quentin D. Young, Class of 1947, leader in public health policy and medical and social justice issues; founded Physicians for a National Health Program and co-founded the Medical Committee for Human Rights,
- Kermit E. Krantz, Class of 1948, Distinguished University Professor of Medicine, University of Kansas. Developed the Marshall-Marchetti-Krantz (MMK) and invented the expandable tampon. Namesake of the Arey/Krantz Museum of Anatomy at the Feinberg School of Medicine.
- John A. D. Cooper, Class of 1951, first president of the Association of American Medical Colleges
- Thomas E. Starzl, Class of 1952, performed the first successful liver transplant in 1967 and received the National Medal of Science in 2004
- Robert M. Blizzard, Class of 1952, pediatric endocrinologist and pioneer of growth hormone therapy
- Robert A. Kyle, Class of 1952, hematologist who developed our modern understanding of amyloidosis and various monoclonal gammopathies
- Joseph P. Kerwin, first physician in space, flew on three skylab missions and later served as director of Space and Life Sciences at NASA
- Alan R. Nelson, Class of 1958, president of the American Medical Association (1989–90) and the World Medical Association (1991–92)
- Robert Michels, Class of 1958, a psychiatrist who became chairman of the Department of Psychiatry at Weill-Cornell Medical College in 1974, served as Chairman of the Payne-Whitney Psychiatric Clinic in Manhattan for 17 years, and then served as Dean and Provost at Cornell from 1991 to 1996
- Sandra F. Olson, Class of 1963, GME 1969, first woman president of American Academy of Neurology, the Illinois State Medical Society, the Chicago Medical Society, and the Chicago Neurological Society
- Irun Cohen, Class of 1963, immunologist at the Weizmann Institute of Science, Israel.
- Joseph Silva, Class of 1966, dean, University of California–Davis School of Medicine, 1997–2005
- Eugene A. Bauer, Class of 1967, vice president for medical affairs and dean, Stanford University School of Medicine, 1995–2001
- Robert F. Spetzler, Class of 1971, J.N. Harber Chairman Emeritus of Neurological Surgery and director emeritus of the Barrow Neurological Institute
- Jay Perman, Class of 1972, president, University of Maryland, Baltimore, 2010 – present, dean, University of Kentucky College of Medicine, 2004–2010
- C. Richard Schlegel, Class of 1972, developed the dominant patent for a vaccine against human papillomavirus (HPV) (administered as Gardasil) to prevent cervical cancer
- David J. Skorton, Class of 1974, president of the University of Iowa 2003–2006, president of Cornell University 2006–2015, secretary of the Smithsonian Institution 2015–2019 and president and CEO of the Association of American Medical Colleges 2019–present.
- Diane E. Meier, Class of 1977, American geriatrician, MacArthur Fellow, and internationally recognized expert on palliative medicine
- Janet Woodcock, Class of 1977, served as interim Commissioner of the Food and Drug Administration (FDA) and Director of the Center for Drug Evaluation and Research (CDER) at the FDA
- Sandra Carson, Class of 1977, principal investigator of the first artificial human ovary and former president of the American Society for Reproductive Medicine
- Michael Mulholland, Class of 1978, Michigan Medical School Senior Associate Dean of Clinical Affairs, Executive Director of the University of Michigan Medical Group, and Surgeon-in-Chief at University Hospital
- Ora Hirsch Pescovitz, Class of 1979, former executive vice president for medical affairs, University of Michigan; CEO, University of Michigan Health System, president of Oakland University
- Deborah Asnis, Class of 1981, infectious disease specialist, discovered and reported first human cases of West Nile virus in the United States.
- David J. Smith, Class of 1981, Rear Admiral, joint staff surgeon/chief medical advisor to the Chairman of the Joint Chiefs of Staff; United States delegate to the North Atlantic Treaty Organization Council of Medical Directors
- Boris Lushniak, Class of 1981, Rear Admiral, deputy U.S. Surgeon General
- Michael S. Parmacek, Class of 1981, chair of the Department of Medicine, Perelman School of Medicine at the University of Pennsylvania
- Catherine R. Lucey, Class of 1982, American internist, geriatrician, and medical educator, UCSF Executive Vice Chancellor and Provost
- David M. Holtzman, Class of 1985, is a distinguished neurologist known for discovering how apoE4 contributes to Alzheimer's Disease and how synaptic activity and sleep modulates the levels of amyloid beta and tau proteins in the brain.
- Peter G. Traber, Class of 1984, president, Baylor College of Medicine, 2003–2008
- Michael Barratt, Class of 1985, NASA mission specialist, 2000–present; member International Space Station Expeditions 19 and 20, 2009; on final flight of Discovery 2011 STS 133.
- Fernando Gonzalez Sfeir, Class of 1985, Board-certified urologist, first Bolivian-born graduate of Northwestern University School of Medicine, together with his first cousin and classmate Patricia Gisela Cavero, a Board-certified cardiologist
- Harold Paz, GME 1985 and 1986, vice president and dean, Penn State Hershey Medical College
- Amy Wagner, clase of 1996, neuroscientist.
- Debi Thomas, Class of 1997: 1988 Olympic Figure Skating Bronze Medalist and orthopedic surgeon
- Melissa L. Gilliam, GME 1999, American pediatric and adolescent gynecologist, and Executive President and Provost of The Ohio State University
