= Will Bulsiewicz =

American gastroenterologist

- Education: Vanderbilt University (B.S. Chemistry); Georgetown University School of Medicine (M.D.); Northwestern University (MSCI); UNC Gillings School of Global Public Health (epidemiology fellowship)
- Occupations: Gastroenterologist; Author; Public speaker
- Writing career
- Genres: WFPB and plant-forward nutrition, dietary fiber, and gut health
- Notable works: Fiber Fueled (2020); The Fiber Fueled Cookbook (2022); Plant Powered Plus (2026)
- Website: theplantfedgut.com

William John Bulsiewicz, better known as Dr. B., is an American triple board-certified gastroenterologist, author, entrepreneur, and advocate for the exploration of the relationship between the gut microbiome, dietary fiber, and plant-based nutrition. He is also an Adjunct Assistant Professor of Medicine at the Emory University School of Medicine. While his first two books (Fiber Fueled and The Fiber Fueled Cookbook) focus entirely on whole-food plant-based (WFPB) approaches, his third book Plant Powered Plus advocates for either a WFPB or a plant-forward Mediterranean style diet.

== Early life and education ==
Bulsiewicz was raised in "a Jesuit-educated family." He studied chemistry at Vanderbilt University and graduated in 2002.

Although originally planning to study pediatrics, Bulsiewicz decided in 2005 to switch fields, and graduated from Georgetown University School of Medicine in 2006 with a specialization in gastroenterology. He then received a master's degree in Clinical Investigation (MSCI) from Northwestern University in 2010; and a certificate in plant-based nutrition from eCornell.

== Career ==
From 2006 to 2009, Bulsiewicz completed his internship and residency at McGaw Medical Center of Northwestern University. Next, he served as chief medical resident in internal medicine from 2009-2010, and from 2010 to 2014 he was a Gastroenterology Fellow at UNC Medical Center (where he also served as chief gastroenterology fellow). During this time, he also received a grant from the National Institutes of Health for a one year epidemiology fellowship at the UNC Gillings School of Global Public Health.

Bulsiewicz is board-certified in gastroenterology and internal medicine, and worked for many years as a gastroenterologist in South Carolina medical centers. He is currently the U.S. Medical Director for Zoe.

=== 38TERA ===
In 2024, Bulsiewicz founded 38TERA, a gut health supplement company focused on microbiome science. The company's flagship product, DMN (Daily Microbiome Nutrition), is a prebiotic supplement combining three classes of prebiotics derived from seven plants, and is certified Low FODMAP. Simon Hill, host of The Proof podcast, serves as on its Scientific Advisory Board.

== Research ==
Bulsiewicz's research and advocacy centers on the relationship between dietary fiber, the gut microbiome, and plant-based nutrition. He references Dan Buettner's work on the Blue Zones, communities around the world who consume predominantly fiber-rich plant-based diets. Bulsiewicz argues that "if you look at the healthiest populations on the planet in modern times, they're in the five blue zones, and all five blue zones are 90 percent plant based. So, they are not necessarily vegan, but they are plant-predominant in a way where the meat is not the centerpiece. The plant is the centerpiece. The meat is the side show." He also advocates for the consumption of plant-based fermented foods for better health.

=== Publications ===
In addition to academic scholarship, he is the author of three books: Fiber Fueled (2020), The Fiber Fueled Cookbook Inspiring Plant-Based Recipes to Turbocharge Your Health (2022), and Plant Powered Plus: Activate the Power of Your Gut to Tame Inflammation and Reclaim Your Health (2026).

Books

- Plant Powered Plus: Activate the Power of Your Gut to Tame Inflammation and Reclaim Your Health. Avery, 2026. ISBN 978-0593418796.
- The Fiber Fueled Cookbook: Inspiring Plant-Based Recipes to Turbocharge Your Health. Avery, 2022. ISBN 978-0593418772.
- Fiber Fueled: The Plant-Based Gut Health Program for Losing Weight, Restoring Your Health, and Optimizing Your Microbiome. Avery, 2020. ISBN 978-0593084564.

Introductions

- Bodrug, Carleigh (2022). PlantYou:140+ Ridiculously Easy, Amazingly Delicious Plant-Based Oil-Free Recipes. New York: Hachette Book Group. ISBN 978-0-306-92304-3. LCCN 2021018222.

Articles

- Bulsiewicz, Will (November 4, 2020). "Why Gut? Why Now?". Georgetown University Medical Center Health Magazine. Archived from the original on November 28, 2024.
- Bulsiewicz, Will (November 30, 2019). "Is Gut-Lag Real? Here's The Science of How Travel Affects Your Gut". MindBodyGreen. Archived from the original on May 20, 2022.

== Personal life ==
Bulsiewicz grew up eating the Standard American Diet, which led to poor health during his medical studies (as nutrition was not part of his medical training). He only turned to a plant-based diet around 2012-2013 (during his time as a Fellow at UNC Chapel Hill) when he met, and was influenced by, Valerie who was already plant-based. They married in 2013, and live with their children in Charleston, South Carolina.
