= Arthur DeBoer =

American cardiologist specializing in cardiac surgery

Arthur DeBoer (July 2, 1917-July 31, 2007) was an American cardiologist specializing in cardiac surgery at Northwestern University's Feinberg School of Medicine. DeBoer was one of the pioneer cardiac surgeons in Chicago and was on staff at Wesley Memorial Hospital (later called Northwestern University Hospital). DeBoer was the hospital's first chief of cardiothoracic surgery, and performed the first open heart operation at Wesley Memorial Hospital in 1958. He served as Chair of Northwestern's Department of Cardiovascular Surgery until 1975. He was also a pioneer in research on congenital heart defects.

He was born to John and Lucy DeBoer in Gallatin County, Montana, and was a graduate of Montana Normal School (now University of Montana Western) earning his B.E. Degree in 1938. He earned a B.S. Degree from University of Montana while teaching school. He graduated from Northwestern University Medical School in 1946 and after serving his internship at Wesley Hospital he served in the U.S. Army Medical Corps in Asia.
