= Suzanne Maman =

American HIV/AIDS researcher

- Education: Bachelor of Science in Human Ecology from Cornell University MSH-International Health from Johns Hopkin's University PhD in International Health from Johns Hopkin's University
- Occupation: Professor UNC Associate Dean for Global Health
- Known for: HIV/AIDS among women

Suzanne Maman is a social scientist who is trained in public health and serving as a professor in the Department of Human Behavior at the University of North Carolina (UNC) and an associate dean for global health at the University's Gillings School. Maman also serves as UNC faculty director at the Duke-UNC Rotary Peace Center. Her specific research interests concern HIV/AIDS among women.

== Life and work ==
Maman completed her Bachelor of Science - Human Ecology from Cornell University in 1992 and pursued her MSH-International Health from Johns Hopkins University's Bloomberg School of Public Health in 1995, as well as her PhD, specializing in International Health in 2000. Now a professor at UNC, Maman teaches a skills-based qualitative research methods course that is required for master's students in health behavior.

== Research ==
For the past 20 years, Maman’s work has focused on the combination of intimate partner violence against young women and their testing for HIV/AIDS, and her research has helped with the development and implementation of violence prevention programs in sub-Saharan Africa. Her work has required the facilitation of national and international collaborations with the World Health Organization (WHO), the Centers for Disease Control and Prevention (CDC), and other U.S. health agencies and educational institutions and global health organizations.

For example, from 2008–2011, Maman collaborated with researchers at South Africa's University of KwaZulu to conduct a randomized controlled clinical trial in Africa studying the effect of enhanced counseling tools with 1,500 pregnant and postpartum women aged 18 and older. Researchers examined the efficacy of offering post-HIV post-test support to the women seeking ante-natal and post-natal care in KwaZulu-Natal, South Africa. During the trial, investigators offered HIV testing as well as voluntary enhanced counseling and provided a continuum of psychosocial support for participants there.

Maman has also informed public health programs in Tanzania and South Africa by documenting how violence increases women’s risk for HIV infection, and how a woman's HIV diagnosis from testing can impact her experiences with violence. Maman's research has led directly to WHO guidance and the development of clinical tools to counsel at-risk women during the HIV testing process."

== Major works ==
- A comparison of HIV/AIDS-related stigma in four countries: Negative attitudes and perceived acts of discrimination towards people living with HIV/AIDS.
- Rates, barriers and outcomes of HIV serostatus disclosure among women in developing countries: implications for prevention of mother-to-child transmission programmes.
- HIV-Positive Women Report More Lifetime Partner Violence: Findings From a Voluntary Counseling and Testing Clinic in Dar es Salaam, Tanzania.
- Women's barriers to HIV-1 testing and disclosure: Challenges for HIV-1 voluntary counselling and testing.
- Promoting male partner HIV testing and safer sexual decision making through secondary distribution of self-tests by HIV-negative female sex workers and women receiving antenatal and post-partum care in Kenya: a cohort study.
- High Rates and Positive Outcomes of HIV-Serostatus Disclosure to Sexual Partners: Reasons for Cautious Optimism from a Voluntary Counseling and Testing Clinic in Dar es Salaam, Tanzania.
