= Hosmer Allen Johnson =

American physician

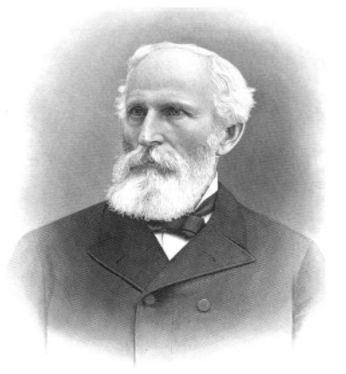
- Born: October 6, 1822; Wales, New York
- Died: February 26, 1891 (aged 68); Chicago, Illinois
- Burial place: Rosehill Cemetery
- Education: University of Michigan; Rush Medical College
- Occupation: Physician

Signature
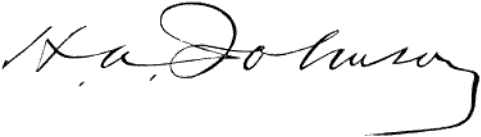

Hosmer Allen Johnson, M.D., L.L.D. (October 6, 1822 – February 26, 1891) was an American physician, academic, and Mason from New York. Badly injured on the family farm, Johnson turned to teaching to support himself. After graduating from the University of Michigan, he moved to Chicago, Illinois, to attend Rush Medical College. There, he became an understudy of William B. Herrick and joined his medical practice. Receiving a Doctor of Medicine in 1852, Johnson was named Lecturer on Physiology at Rush, eventually chairing a department there. In 1859, he co-founded the Chicago Medical College at Lind University, which later became the Feinberg School of Medicine of Northwestern University. During the Civil War, Johnson was the top medical aide in the state, presiding over the Board of Medical Examiners for the State of Illinois.

== Biography ==
Hosmer Allen Johnson was born in Wales, New York, on October 6, 1822. While still and infant, the family moved to Boston, New York. There, Johnson attended public schools. When he was twelve, the family moved to Almont, Michigan; helping with the family farm there, Johnson was unable to attend school. When he was sixteen, Johnson sustained a grievous injury and was no longer able to perform manual labor. In 1840, Johnson began teaching school. Three years later, Johnson decided to further pursue his education at Romeo Academy in Romeo, Michigan. In 1846, he was accepted at the University of Michigan in Ann Arbor. However, after two years, complications from his injury forced him to withdraw from school. He spent the next winter in Vandalia, Illinois, again supporting himself by teaching. There, he studied medicine with J. B. Hendrick. After his health improved, he returned to the university and received a Bachelor of Arts.

Upon graduation, Johnson moved to Flint, Michigan, and continued to study medicine while teaching. In October 1850, he moved to Chicago, Illinois, to attend lectures at Rush Medical College. He became an understudy of Professor William B. Herrick, the brother of the Vandalia doctor. In 1851, he became the first intern at the Illinois General Hospital of the Lakes, later known as Mercy Hospital. In February 1852, he received his Doctor of Medicine degree from Rush. The same year, he was awarded a Master of Arts from the University of Michigan. Johnson joined Professor Herrick's medical practice and helped him edit the Northwestern Medical and Surgical Journal.

From 1852 to 1859, Johnson was a member of the Board of Attending Physicians and Surgeons at Mercy. In the autumn of 1853, Johnson was named a lecturer on physiology at Rush Medical College. Two years later he was named the Professor of Materia Medica, Therapeutics, and Medical Jurisprudence. In 1857, he was named chair of the Physiology and General Pathology department. In 1859, he left Rush Medical College to begin a medical school at Lind University with Edmund Andrews, Ralph Nelson Isham, and David Rutter, the Chicago Medical College. Upon organization, Johnson was named president of the faculty and professor of materia media & therapeutics. The next year he chaired the Physiology and Histology departments, then the General Pathology and Public Hygiene departments in 1864.

That winter, his health failed again and despite a six-month sabbatical in Europe, Johnson was forced to retire from his professorship and department presidency. The board of trustees then immediately elected him president of the board. He was also named an Emeritus Professor of General Pathology and Public Hygiene. Johnson joined the Chicago Medical Society in 1852. Later that year, he was named a secretary of the Illinois State Medical Society. He was elected its president in 1858, serving a one-year term. He was later the organization's Chairman of the Committee on Drugs and Medicines. Johnson joined the American Association for the Advancement of Science in 1853. He joined the American Medical Association in 1854 and was named a secretary in 1860. He co-founded the Chicago Academy of Sciences and was its first Corresponding Secretary.

In 1865, upon completion of the Cook County Hospital, John was named one of its consulting physician. Likewise, he was later named a consultant at the Chicago Eye and Ear Infirmary. Johnson was also named to the Board of Health for the City of Chicago.

=== Civil War ===
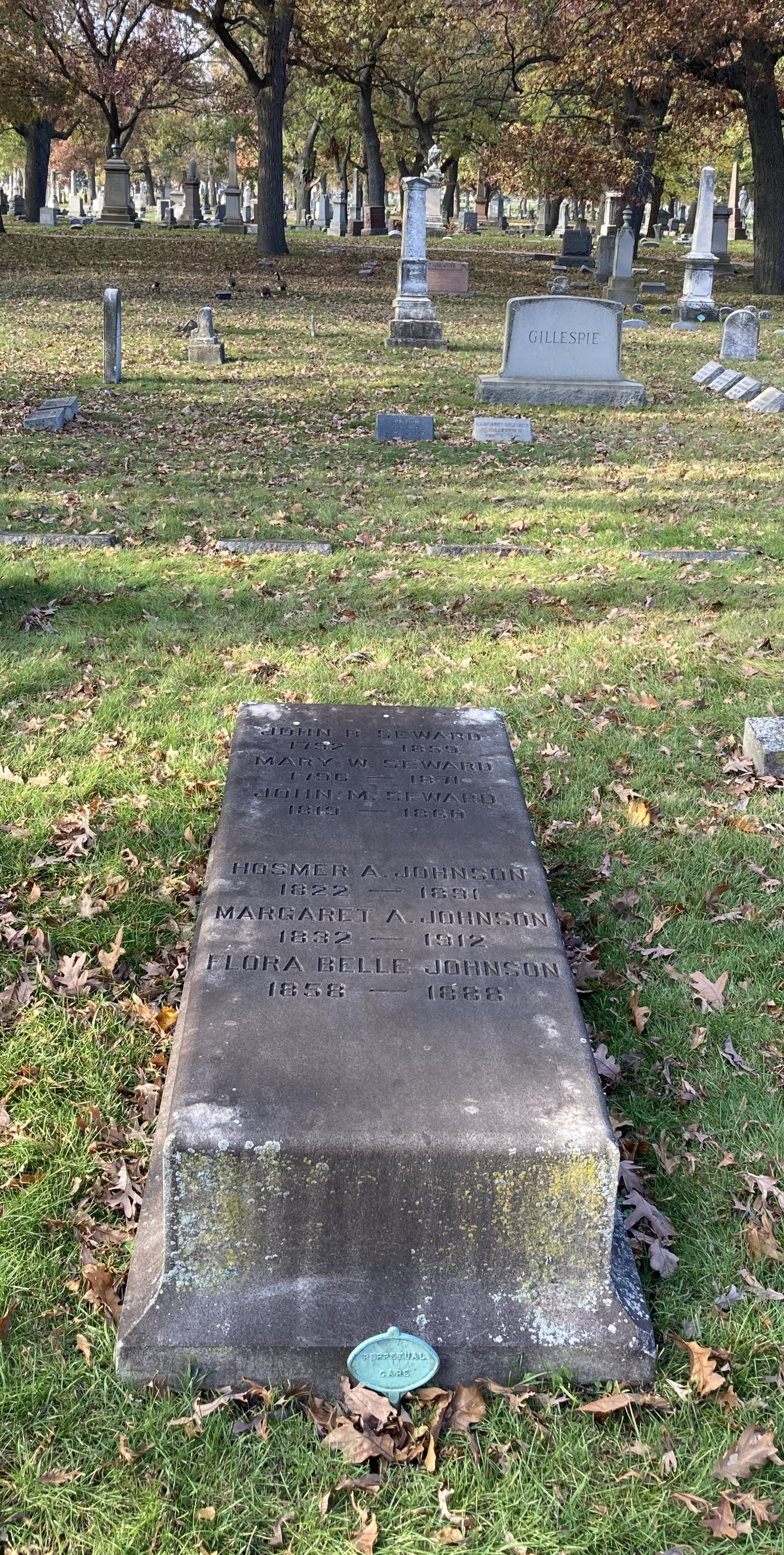
Johnson's grave at Rosehill Cemetery

In 1861, Governor of Illinois Richard Yates named Johnson to the Board of Medical Examiners for the State of Illinois, where he was immediately elected President of the Board. He was responsible for overseeing the qualifications of physicians for the appointment in the Medical Department of the Army and served the Governor as chief medical adviser. The United States Sanitary Commission requested that Johnson visit the Department of the South; he was present at General David Hunter's request for the Second Battle of Fort Sumter.

=== Personal life ===
Johnson married Margaret Ann Seward, a relative of William H. Seward, in May 1855. They had two children, a son and a daughter. The daughter died young, but the son, Frank Seward Johnson, followed his father into the medical profession. He was later named the Professor of General Pathology and Pathological Anatomy at the Chicago Medical College. Hosmer Johnson was initiated into the Masonic Order in 1853 and rose to become Grand Orator of the Grand Lodge of Illinois. He organized a Knights Templar chapter for Illinois and was first officer of that branch for two terms. He became a member of the Supreme Council of the Scottish Rite Northern Jurisdiction in 1861, later becoming and officer. He could speak seven foreign languages fluently and also had a strong knowledge of the Ojibwe language. He served on the board of trustees of the University of Chicago and Northwestern University. Johnson died from pneumonia at his Chicago home on February 26, 1891, and was buried in Rosehill Cemetery.
