= Sandra F. Olson =

Sandra F. Olson is an American leader for women in organized medicine. Olson earned her MD from Northwestern University Medical School in 1963, when only 5 percent of medical students were women. She continued on to do her residency at Northwestern's McGaw Medical Center through 1969. In 2003, Olson became the first woman president of the American Academy of Neurology. She finished her term in 2005. She was also the first woman to be president of the Illinois State Medical Society, the Chicago Medical Society, and the Chicago Neurological Society.
