= Clifford G. Grulee =

American pediatrician (1880–1962)

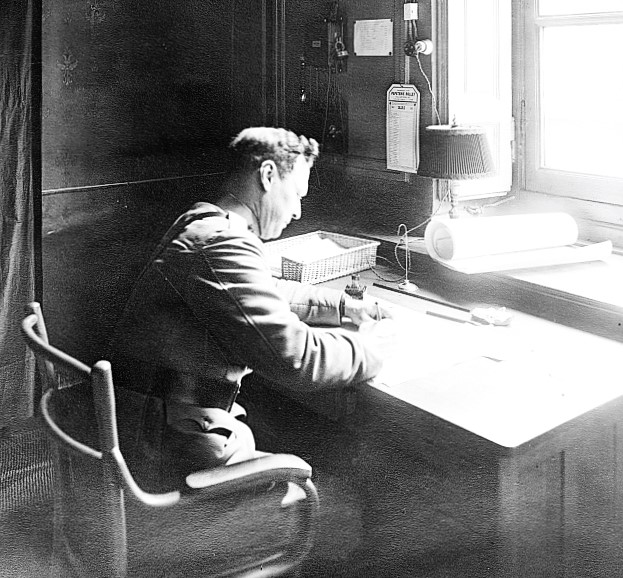
Grulee in 1918, as Medical Chief at the Lyon American Red Cross office

Clifford Grosselle Grulee (January 3, 1880 – October 24, 1962) was an American pediatrician and a founding member of the American Academy of Pediatrics.

== Life and career ==
Grulee was born in 1880 in Newport, Kentucky. He was raised in Oxford, Ohio, where he attended Miami University and graduated in 1899. He subsequently graduated from Northwestern University Medical School in 1903. He married Margaret Freer in 1907 and they would later have two children.

After studying pediatrics in Vienna and Breslau, Grulee returned to Chicago where he taught briefly at Northwestern University Medical School before taking up a teaching position at Rush Medical College in 1908. He remained at Rush for over 30 years and was eventually made a clinical professor and head of the department of pediatrics in 1942; he was also made a professor of pediatrics at the University of Illinois College of Medicine in 1941. As a clinical pediatrician, he was the chief of pediatrics at Chicago's Presbyterian Hospital and a consulting pediatrician at Saint Francis Hospital of Evanston.

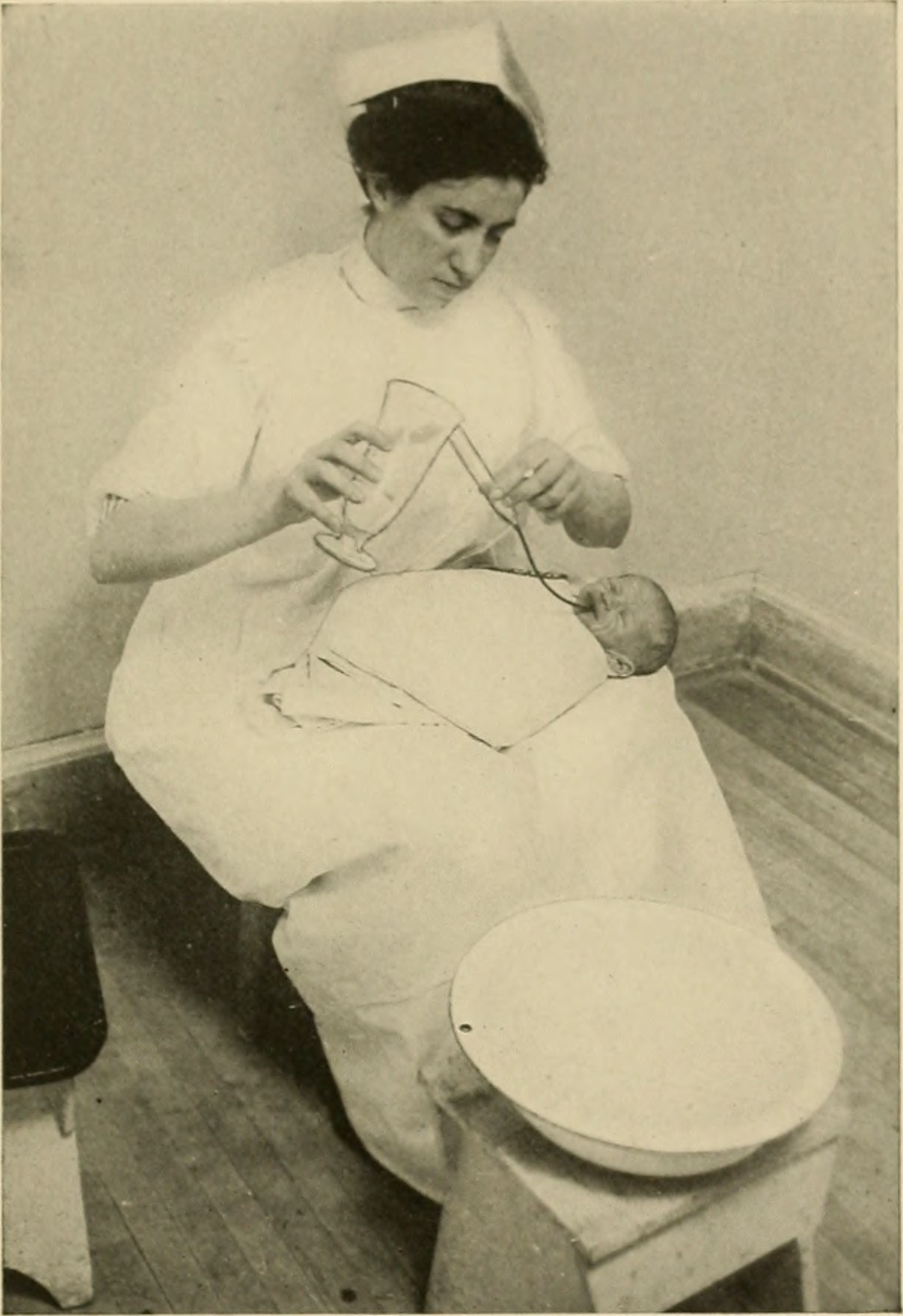
Stomach washing, from page 274 of Infant feeding (1914), by Grulee

Grulee was involved in numerous pediatric societies in the United States and internationally. In 1911, he helped to establish the now-defunct Central States Pediatric Society and served as president in 1921. He was a founding member of the American Academy of Pediatrics in 1930, and served as the organization's first executive secretary until his retirement in 1951. Upon his retirement, the Grulee Award was created to honor individuals who have made "outstanding" contributions to the organization.

He was also involved in the American Pediatric Society, serving as a member of the council and as president of the society in 1938. He wrote and co-wrote textbooks on Infant Feeding (1912), the Newborn (1926), and The Child in Health and Disease (1950).

Grulee died on October 24, 1962, in Evanston, Illinois. He died while attending a dinner hosted by the executive board of the American Academy of Pediatrics in his honor.

== Bibliography ==
- Infant Feeding. W.B. Saunders Company. 1912. ISBN 978-1-331-96209-0.
