= Amy Wagner =

American neuroscientist

Academic background
- Education: BS, Biology, 1992, Illinois State University; MD, 1996, Feinberg School of Medicine

Amy K. Wagner is an American neuroscientist.

== Early life and education ==
Wagner completed her Bachelor of Science degree in biology from Illinois State University in 1992 and her medical degree from Northwestern University Medical School in 1996.

== Career ==
During her tenure at the University of Pittsburgh (Pitt), Wagner has focused on neurotransmitter systems, neuro-inflammation, and hormonal influences on secondary injury and recovery after traumatic brain injury (TBI). In 2017, Wagner was promoted to the rank of full professor in Pitt's Department of Physical Medicine and Rehabilitation. The following year, Wagner was elected president of the National Neurotrauma Society for the 2019–20 year.

In 2020, Wagner was elected to the National Academy of Medicine (NAM) "for her work in developing innovative models of brain injury, using in vivo neurotransmission monitoring to study genomic/proteomic/metabolomic contributions to pathophysiology and functional recovery. She has successfully combined efforts of multiple disciplines including neuropsychology/surgery, endocrinology, pharmacology, and public health to advance the field." She was also the recipient of a Faculty Research Initiative Award worth $20,000 for her study Mechanistic pharmacological studies of striato-pallidal-thalamic integrity after cardiac arrest induced hypoxic ischemic brain injury.
