= Jonathan J. Juliano =

American scientist

Jonathan James Juliano is an American physician/scientist. He currently works at UNC School of Medicine.

== Biography ==
Jonathan Juliano is Professor of Medicine, Division of Infectious Diseases at UNC School of Medicine, where he also is Associate Director, UNC Infectious Diseases Fellowship Training Program. He has been on faculty since 2009. In addition, he is an adjunct assistant professor in the Department of Epidemiology at the UNC Gillings School of Global Public Health and an instructor in the Curriculum of Genetics and Molecular Biology.

He received his BSc from University of Toronto, Toronto, Canada in 1994. He completed a MSPH at the UNC Gillings School of Global Public Health (1997) and his MD at the UNC School of Medicine in 2001.

He trained in Internal Medicine and Pediatrics at the University of Minnesota, Minneapolis, MN from 2001 to 2005. Following this, he completed his Infectious Disease Fellowship at University of North Carolina, Chapel Hill, NC in 2008. He is board certified in Internal Medicine and Infectious Diseases.

== Research ==
Jonathan Juliano has led research efforts in infectious diseases and genetics, with the goal of improving our understanding of how infections cause disease, how infectious agents evolve, and how the genetic diversity impacts our understanding of drug resistance. His work has focused on malaria; however he has worked with other agents as well. In particular, he is interested in understanding within host genetic diversity of malaria infections, as each infection may contain multiple genetically different parasite strains, and the impact of this diversity on drug and vaccine efficacy. His work in this area has called into question some of the current practices of how clinical trials for malaria are conducted.

He has been the recipient of several awards including the Merle A. Sande/Pfizer Fellowship Award in International Diseases and the Terry Lee Award from the North Carolina Infectious Disease Society. He has also authored articles and a book chapter concerning the clinical care of malaria. Juliano collaborates with Dr. Carla Cerami at the University of North Carolina and Dr. Steve M. Taylor at Duke University School of Medicine.

In 2019, he was elected to the American Society for Clinical Investigation. In 2022 he was named a Fellow of the American Society of Tropical Medicine and Hygiene and the Infectious Diseases Society of America.
