= Arthur John Booker =

American military physician, community activist and health advocate (1881–1957)

- Born: October 31, 1881; San Antonio, Texas
- Died: August 25, 1957 (aged 75); Los Angeles, California
- Resting place: Rosedale Cemetery, Los Angeles, California, USA
- Education: Prairie View College, Northwestern University Medical School
- Occupation: physician
- Spouse: Noami Coalston
- Parent(s): Anderson Booker and Carrie Raglan Booker

Arthur John Booker, M.D. (October 31, 1881 – August 25, 1957) was a prominent community activist and health advocate who worked in Des Moines, Iowa, and Los Angeles, California. He also served as a physician with the 365th Infantry Regiment of the 92nd Division during World War I, where many of the African American soldiers served.

== Early life ==
Arthur Booker was born on October 31, 1881 to Anderson and Carrie Booker in San Antonio, Texas. His father had been a farmer who worked in South Carolina before the break of the American Civil War. According to records, his father served in the U.S. Colored Infantries in the Union Army and listed that he was from Texas.

The couple had had seven children together—Arthur, Ola, Ulissia, Allen, Cameron, Leaman, and Melvin.

Booker attended public school in San Antonio, and then proceeded to continue is education in Prairie View College in Texas. Booker held no real attachment to Texas as he headed all the way to Chicago, Illinois, to attend Northwestern University's medical school (now called Feinberg School of Medicine), with a large population of white students. He graduated from Northwestern on June 28, 1906. He left the school with both bachelor of science and medical doctor degrees, which was part of the medical school's curriculum before the 1930s.

After graduating, Dr. Booker interned at Provident Hospital in Cook County. He did not remain there for long, as he decided to try his skills in Europe for several years, before becoming moving to Iowa in 1919.

Dr. Booker became an instructor at Drake University’s medical school, teaching courses on human anatomy. After two years, he left the academic sphere and opened a private practice, specializing as a diagnostician.

Booker was well known in Des Moines, where he eventually settled, as he published many health articles in the Journal of Iowa State Medical Society and wrote a health column in the local African American publication, Iowa Bystander. One of the articles he wrote was one published in 1915, regarding bronchopneumonia in children, which he saw was a growing concern. Booker also made occasional speeches at the African Methodist Episcopal Church on disease prevention, particularly on tuberculosis. Many physicians in Iowa, including Dr. Booker, believed that tuberculosis had a large chance of making a comeback, as the Iowa State Medical Society in 1915 calculated 145 cases appeared per 100,000 persons.

== Military service ==
Eager to take part in the new war in Europe, Booker volunteered for the Iowa National Guard, which was one of the first dispatches to be sent to France in World War I. However, much to his disappointment, he was rejected because of his race. However this did not deter him, as through the next year he sought to recruit African-American men for the war and became well known for how articulately he could speak to a crowd. Near his home, a new camp was erected for World War I volunteers called Fort Des Moines. It had been opened for training African-American men as there had been a huge influx of African-American volunteers and a petition was erected by the students of Howard University. However, there was still some discontent at the facility as many soldiers found that they had been unfairly assessed for merely being black. At the age of 36, Booker volunteered for the Army Medical Corps and once accepted was made a first lieutenant.

Like the majority of the African-American recruits, Booker was sent for basic training at Fort Des Moines Provisional Army Officer Training School. After about two months of training, Booker was assigned to the 365th Infantry Regiment which was part of the 92nd Division's 183rd infantry Brigade, which was under the command of Brigadier General Malvern Hill Barnum.

Before arriving in Europe, Booker spent additional training with his unit at Camp Grant in Illinois. In 1917, Booker and many African-American men were sent to France. Exhausted from facing aggressive German assaults, the French leadership had requested American reinforcements for months. Not wanting to deal with the African-American soldiers, General Pershing sent the 92nd Division to assist.

At the arrival of Booker, the Spanish influenza had already taken the lives of many soldiers and an epidemic was spreading. The majority of Lieutenant Booker's service was spent aiding the ailing men who were suffering from influenza or other illnesses associated with months of living and fighting in the trenches, and the harsh winter that followed.

== Career ==
After the war, Booker returned to his wife in Des Moines and continued his practice. He later chaired the Health Bureau of Negro Business Men's League and lectured on healthy living.

In the 1920s, there was a large influx of African Americans moving to California for better job opportunities, and the Bookers were amongst them. Dr. Booker took a position as a surgeon in Los Angeles, California. Along with his job, he also a member of the Howard Drew Medical Association. Booker was a community organizer, participating and leading many events for African Americans. When Jesse Owens came to Los Angeles in 1935, Booker was one of the community leaders that welcomed him.

Booker dabbled in politics as he was listed as a lifetime member of the American Legion and the NAACP.

== Personal life ==
Booker married Naomi Coalston. They did not have any children.

== Death ==
Booker died on August 25, 1957, at Good Samaritan Hospital. He was survived by his wife. He was buried in Rosedale Cemetery.
