= Carleigh Bodrug =

Canadian writer

- Education: University of Western Ontario
- Occupations: Cookbook author and blogger
- Writing career
- Subject: Plant-based/Vegan cookbooks
- Notable work: PlantYou cookbooks
- Website: plantyou.com

Carleigh Bodrug is a Canadian plant-based/vegan author who is known for her PlantYou cookbooks and advocacy of waste minimisation.

== Early life and education ==
Bodrug grew up on a farm in Ontario, Canada. She was a journalism major at University of Western Ontario, where she also served as a student health reporter for the campus news channel. Bodrug began her PlantYou food blog after her father was diagnosed with colon cancer.

== Career ==
Bodrug's first job was at a radio station. She also created her PlantYou Instagram account in 2016 to document plant-based cooking, eventually becoming a full-time food blogger. She published her first cookbook PlantYou: 140+ Ridiculously Easy, Amazingly Delicious Plant-Based Oil-Free Recipes in 2022, and a follow-up cookbook in 2024. This second cookbook, PlantYou: Scrappy Cooking focuses on plant-based low-waste recipes, and includes a lemon-peel pasta recipe. Bodrug has stated that one of the largest reasons she went plant-based is because of the environmental implications of animal agriculture.

Bodrug's Instagram video of her turning discarded orange peels into candy obtained 1 million views.

== Cookbooks ==
PlantYou: 140+ Ridiculously Easy, Amazingly Delicious Plant-Based Oil-Free Recipes (2022) won first place in the 2023 IVFF awards, and was shortlisted for the 2023 Taste Canada Awards Health or Special Diet Cookbooks. In addition, Woman's Day named it the "Best New Vegetarian Cookbook of 2022," Runner's World included it in its list of the "6 Best Vegan Cookbooks to Get More Plants in Your Diet" in 2022, Food & Wine named it one of "the 20 Best Vegan Cookbooks for Every Type of Meal" in 2024.

In 2024, columnist Avery Yale Kamila lists her next cookbook, PlantYou: Scrappy Cooking (2024) among "The year's best vegan cookbooks" in the Portland Press Herald, Chowhound lists it as one of the "15 Best Vegetarian Cookbooks Of 2024," VegNews lists it as both one of the "Top 100 Vegan Cookbooks of All Time," and as one of "The Best Vegan Cookbooks of 2024."

=== Bibliography ===
- PlantYou: Scrappy Cooking: 140+ Plant-Based Zero-Waste Recipes That Are Good for You, Your Wallet, and the Planet. Hachette Book Group, 2024. ISBN 978-0306832420.
- PlantYou: 140+ Ridiculously Easy, Amazingly Delicious Plant-Based Oil-Free Recipes. Hachette Book Group, 2022. ISBN 978-0306923043 (with an introduction by Dr. Will Bulsiewicz).
