= Julie Story Byerley =

American physician

Julie Byerley
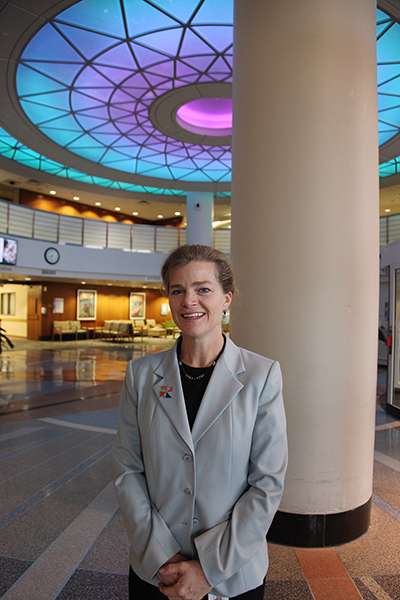
- Born: Julie Story; February 6, 1970; Lynchburg, Virginia
- Education: Rhodes College (BA); University of North Carolina at Chapel Hill (MPH); Duke University (MD)
- Known for: Vice Dean for Education at the University of North Carolina at Chapel Hill School of Medicine
- Spouse: Mike Byerley
- Children: 2
- Scientific career
- Fields: Pediatrician, Medical education
- Thesis: The Epidemiology of Teen Parenting in North Carolina (1998)

Julie Story Byerley (February 6, 1970) is an American physician who is known as a leader in the fields of medical education and pediatrics. Byerley has served as a clinical professor and Vice Dean for Education for the University of North Carolina at Chapel Hill School of Medicine. She currently serves as President and Dean of Geisinger Commonwealth School of Medicine as well as Executive Vice President and Chief Academic Officer for Geisinger Health System.

== Background ==
Byerley was born on February 6, 1970 in Lynchburg, Virginia to Brenda and Ed Story. She was the oldest of two children.

== Education ==
Byerley attended Spartanburg High School in Spartanburg, South Carolina where she graduated in 1988.

In 1992, Byerley graduated with a Bachelor of Arts, cum laude from Rhodes College in Memphis, Tennessee. She majored in physics but also completed her teaching certification in secondary science. Byerley was a science teacher at North Charleston High School in Charleston, South Carolina from 1992 to 1993.

Byerley began her medical training at the Duke University School of Medicine in 1994. During her third year of medical school she completed a Master's of Public Health at the University of North Carolina at Chapel Hill. Her concentration was maternal and child health. She completed her MPH in 1998 and Doctorate of Medicine in 1998.

Upon completion of her MD, Byerley did her residency in pediatrics at University of North Carolina Hospitals where she also served as chief resident from 2001 to 2002.

== Academic career ==
After completing her residency in 2002, Byerley joined the faculty at UNC as Clinical Assistant Professor. Byerley is an advocate for women's health issues and believes proper healthcare should begin with continuity of care for children.

In 2004, Byerley was named as the Director of Medical Student Education in Pediatrics. Funding was provided from The Medical Foundation Excellence Fund and The Medical Alumni Endowment Fund in 2006 to build the resources utilized by the faculty Teaching Center. These online resources support faculty development of their teaching skills.

The UNC Academy of Educators organized and inducted their first class in 2007. Byerley has remained an active fellow for this group since that time and even served as co-director until 2013.

She was promoted in 2008 to Clinical Associate Professor. Byerley began serving as Assistant Course Director to the School of Medicine Teaching Scholars in 2008 as well.

Byerley mentored two pediatrics residents in a 2009 QI project where they developed two journals. This project was funded by the NC Children's Promise Grant.

In 2010, Byerley became the Pediatric Residency Program Director. Later that year, Byerley lead a $3.7 Million Health Resources and Services Administration grant to create the primary care pediatrics residency.

Jack and Wanda Entwistle provided funding to Byerley in 2010 through the NC Children's Hospital Development Office to provide support for the Transition to Pediatric Internship Course. This course was designed to give graduating medical students valuable skills that will assist them as they become interns.

Byerley remained in the Pediatric Residency Program Director until 2013 when she was promoted to Clinical Professor and assumed the role of Vice Dean for Education in the UNC School of Medicine.

As the Vice Dean for Education, Byerley has overseen the transition from a traditional medical school curriculum to the new UNC Translational Education at Carolina (TEC) that began in 2014. The TEC curriculum is designed to improve “critical thinking and interpersonal communication skills have become more important than the memorization of information.”

On September 24, 2021, Byerley was named President and Dean of Geisinger Commonwealth School of Medicine as well as Executive Vice President and Chief Academic Officer for Geisinger Health System.

== Awards ==
Byerley was inducted into Phi Beta Kappa society at Rhodes College in 1992.

While attending the Duke University School of Medicine, Byerley earned the Eva J. Salber Award in 1997 for her teen parenting needs assessment project. She also earned the 1998 Delta Omega Student Service Award from the University of North Carolina at Chapel Hill School of Public Health for her presentation of “Epidemiology of Teen Parenting and Teen Parenting Needs Assessment Data”.

As a resident, Byerley was selected by the UNC medical students as the “Outstanding Teaching Resident” in 2000.

On beginning her career in academic medicine at UNC, she was a participant in the UNC School of Medicine Teaching Scholars Program in 2003 and 2004. In 2005, Byerley was a preceptor inductee to the Eugene Mayer Community Service Honor Society. Byerley was selected by the Chair of Pediatrics for the “Excellence in Teaching Award” from 2003 to 2006. The third and fourth year medical students chose her for the “Sun Trust Banks Excellence in Teaching Award” in 2006.

The American Academy of Pediatrics has awarded Byerley two Special Achievement Awards. The first was in 2006 for “successfully nurturing medical student interest in pediatric careers” and the second was in 2008 for her work in organizing chapter interest groups for young physicians and medical students.

In 2007, she was selected as a participant for the Association of American Medical Colleges Early Career Women Faculty Professional Development Seminar. The American Academy of Pediatrics selected Byerley as a participant in the 2008 Legislative Conference. In 2009 she participated in both the Academic Pediatric Association Leadership Development Seminar and the UNC Healthcare Program in Leadership Development Course.

Since 2007, Byerley has been selected as one of the “Best Doctors in America” every year.

Byerley was a faculty inductee to Alpha Omega Alpha in 2008.

While serving as the Pediatrics Clerkship Director, the senior medical students selected Pediatrics as the “Best Clinical Clerkship” in 2003, 2005, 2007, 2008, and 2009. Senior medical students also selected Byerley for the Hyman L. Battle Distinguished Excellence in Teaching Award in the Clinical Sciences for both 2005 and 2009. She then went on to be selected as a “UNC School of Medicine Pearls Session” speaker from 2005 to 2010. The graduating classes of both 2006 and 2010 named Byerley for the “UNC School of Medicine Professor Award”. Graduation classes in 2008 and 2011 had Byerley as their Medical School Graduation Hooder.

Senior pediatrics residents selected Byerley for the “Richard C. Morris Faculty Teaching Award” in both 2003 and 2010.

Byerley was the Medical Alumni Distinguished Teaching Professor 2006 - 2010.

The nurses of the North Carolina Children's Hospital selected Byerley for the 2010 James Emonson Faculty Honour.

In 2013, Byerley was accepted as a participant for the Association of American Medical Colleges LEAD Program. She was also accepted as a participant in the Executive Leadership in Academic Medicine (ELAM) Program for Women.

Byerley received one of the 2015 Distinguished Teaching Awards for Post-Baccalaureate Instruction from UNC Chancellor Carol Folt.
