= Wen-Yi Huang =

Cancer epidemiologist

Wen-Yi Huang is a cancer epidemiologist who primarily researches colorectal and prostate tumors. She is a staff scientist in the metabolic epidemiology branch at the National Cancer Institute.

== Life ==
Huang received a Ph.D. in epidemiology from the UNC Gillings School of Global Public Health in 1998, with concentrations on gene-environment interactions and etiologic heterogeneity of breast cancer, defined by molecular markers. She completed two years of postdoctoral research in the epidemiology department at Glaxo Wellcome. She joined the National Cancer Institute (NCI) as a staff scientist metabolic epidemiology branch in the division of cancer epidemiology and genetics (DCEG) in 2000.

Huang provides scientific consultations for nationwide research on cancer etiology and early markers in the NCI Prostate, Lung, Colorectal, and Ovarian (PLCO) Cancer Screening Trial; she attends steering, review, and management meetings for the Trial and participates in cohort consortium and data pooling efforts. As a cancer epidemiologist, her studies focus on cancer risk related to genetic, epigenetic, and other molecular markers in DNA repair, metabolic, infection, and inflammation pathways, with primary interests in colorectal and prostate tumors.
