= Harold Paz =

American physician and health care executive

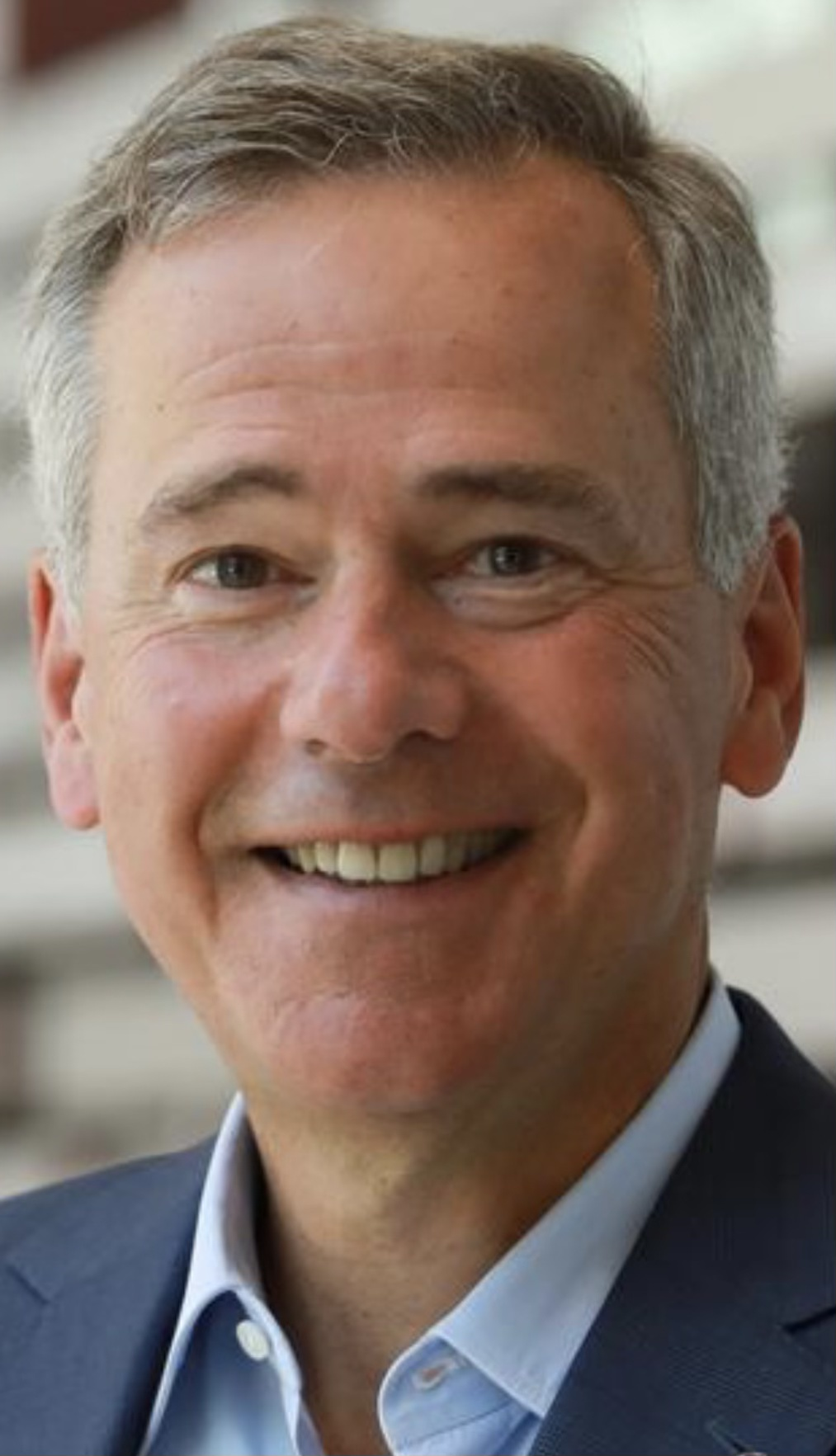

former Executive Vice President Stony Brook University
- Incumbent
- Assumed office October 2021

1st Executive Vice President Ohio State University
- In office February 2019 – August 2021

1st Chancellor for Health Affairs Wexner Medical Center
- In office February 2019 – August 2021

Penn State Hershey Medical Center and Health System
- In office April 2006 – July 2014

Robert Wood Johnson Medical School
- In office April 1995 – April 2006

Personal details
- Born: New York City
- Education: University of Rochester; Tufts University; University of Rochester School of Medicine and Dentistry
- Profession: American Physician
- Website: wexnermedical.osu.edu/about-us/leading-the-way/chancellor

Academic background
- Education: University of Rochester School of Medicine and Dentistry

Academic work
- Discipline: Internal Medicine
- Sub-discipline: Pulmonology

Harold L. Paz is an academic physician and senior executive. His positions have included executive vice president and chief medical officer at CVS Health/Aetna, executive vice president and chancellor for health affairs at the Ohio State University and CEO of the Ohio State Wexner Medical Center, and executive vice president of health sciences at Stony Brook University and CEO of Stony Brook University Medicine.

Paz is currently an operating partner at Khosla Ventures.

== Early life and education ==
Paz was born in New York City. His parents immigrated to the United States after World War II. He later moved with his family to Duchess County, New York where he attended public school.

Paz attended the University of Rochester from 1973 to 1977. He graduated with a Bachelor of Arts degree in biology and psychology in 1977, and subsequently graduated with a Master of Science degree in life science engineering from Tufts University in 1979. Paz went on to receive a medical degree from the University of Rochester School of Medicine and Dentistry in 1982. Following medical school, he completed his residency training in internal medicine at Northwestern University Medical Center where he served as chief medical resident, in 1986. He continued his medical training at Johns Hopkins Hospital in pulmonary, critical care and sleep medicine where he was Eudowood Fellow. Paz also was a postdoctoral fellow in Environmental Health Sciences at the Johns Hopkins School of Hygiene and Public Health.

He holds an honorary degree from Elizabethtown College.

== Career ==
In 1995, Paz was selected to serve as the fifth dean of the Robert Wood Johnson Medical School (Rutgers University Medical School), and the CEO of Robert Wood Johnson University Medical Group.

In 2006, Paz was recruited to the Penn State Milton S. Hershey Medical Center, where he held multiple leadership roles throughout his tenure, including CEO, senior vice president for Health Affairs for the Pennsylvania State University, dean of the College of Medicine and professor of medicine and public health sciences. He was chairman of the council of deans of the Association of American Medical Colleges from 2012 to 2014, and chair of the board of directors of the Association of Academic Health Centers from 2013 to 2014.

Following two decades as a medical school dean and healthcare CEO, Paz was recruited by Aetna in 2014 to lead clinical strategy and policy for all of Aetna's domestic and global business. Paz served as executive vice president and chief medical officer and was a member of Aetna's executive committee where he advanced an innovative personalized health strategy. Called AetnaCare, this strategy focused bringing care into the home and local community by leveraging clinical analytics, member engagement, digital and telehealth solutions, along with value-based arrangements with pharmaceutical companies and physicians to address the social, behavior and environmental determinants of health. These efforts were realized when Paz served as medical lead for the integration planning process with CVS Health through May 2019. At Aetna, Paz led Aetna's response to the national opioid crisis. Aetna sent warning letters to dentists and physicians who were in the top percent of high opioid prescribers.

Paz joined Ohio State University in June 2019 as the first Chancellor for Health Affairs, assuming oversight of clinical and academic health affairs of the over $4 billion Ohio State University Wexner Medical Center, as well as Ohio State's seven health science colleges: College of Dentistry, College of Medicine, College of Nursing, College of Optometry, College of Pharmacy, College of Public Health, and College of Veterinary Medicine. In August 2020, the Ohio State Wexner Medical Center Board of Trustees approved construction plans presented by Paz for a new $1.8 billion, 26-floor inpatient hospital tower with 1.9 million square-feet dedicated to enhanced research, clinical training and patient care. Scheduled to open in early 2026, this new facility will increase Ohio State's total hospital count to eight. While heading the Ohio State University Wexner Medical Center, Paz also led the creation of an Anti-Racism Action Plan to support structural and systemic change toward equity in health and well-being. The plan includes specific actions to be taken by Ohio State's Wexner Medical Center and each health science college to address the direct line between racism and health outcomes.

In October 2021, Paz became executive vice president of health sciences at Stony Brook University and CEO of Stony Brook University Medicine in Stony Brook, New York. In this role, he led academic, hospital, and community initiatives to ensure continued development of Stony Brook Medicine as a premier academic medical center and health system and a world-class leader in research and innovation. Under his leadership, Stony Brook launched the Center for Healthy Aging at Stony Brook Medicine and completed a 170,000 sq. ft. ambulatory care facility at Lake Grove.

In April 2024, Paz joined Khosla Ventures as an operating partner, investing and working with companies doing digital innovation in healthcare, including a strong focus on using AI to improve health outcomes and increase access to care.

== Additional posts ==
Paz previously served as professor adjunct of internal medicine at Yale University School of Medicine. He is a former member of the National Academy of Medicine (NAM) Leadership Consortium.

Paz was one of the working-group participants on the NAM Action Collaborative on Countering the U.S. Opioid Epidemic. He has served on the National Academy of Science, Engineering and Medicine Committee on Implications of Discarded Weight-Based Drugs. In addition, Paz serves on the Curai Health advisory board and the board of directors of Research!America. He has served on the boards of Select Medical Holdings Corporation, the National Health Council, the Aetna Foundation, United Surgical Partners International, the Association of American Medical Colleges, and the Association of Academic Health Centers. Previously, he served on the board of directors of the Dorothy Rider Pool Health Care Trust, Vyteris, Inc., the Life Sciences Greenhouse of Central Pennsylvania, a number of hospital and health system boards, as well as the Johnson & Johnson Bio-Science Advisory Board.

== Speaking, writing, and honors ==
In 2012, Paz was named in Becker's Healthcare's list of 100 Physician Leaders of Hospital and Health Systems, and in 2013 in its list of 125 Physician Leaders of Hospitals and Health Systems. In 2018, he was listed as one of the 50 Most Influential Physician Executives and Leaders of the year by Modern Healthcare.

Paz has authored over 100 publications and his research has focused on quality management, clinical outcomes, healthcare effectiveness and employee health benefit design.

He speaks on healthcare-industry subjects such as health equity and bridging the racial divide in healthcare.

== Personal life ==
Paz is married to Sharon H. Press, PhD, a child and adolescent clinical psychologist. They have two adult children. Paz has been involved in a number of philanthropic organizations including, most recently, serving on the board of directors of the Whitaker Center for Science and the Arts.
