= UNC Gillings School of Global Public Health =

Public institute in Chapel Hill, North Carolina, U.S.

Coordinates: 35.9058°N 79.0541°W

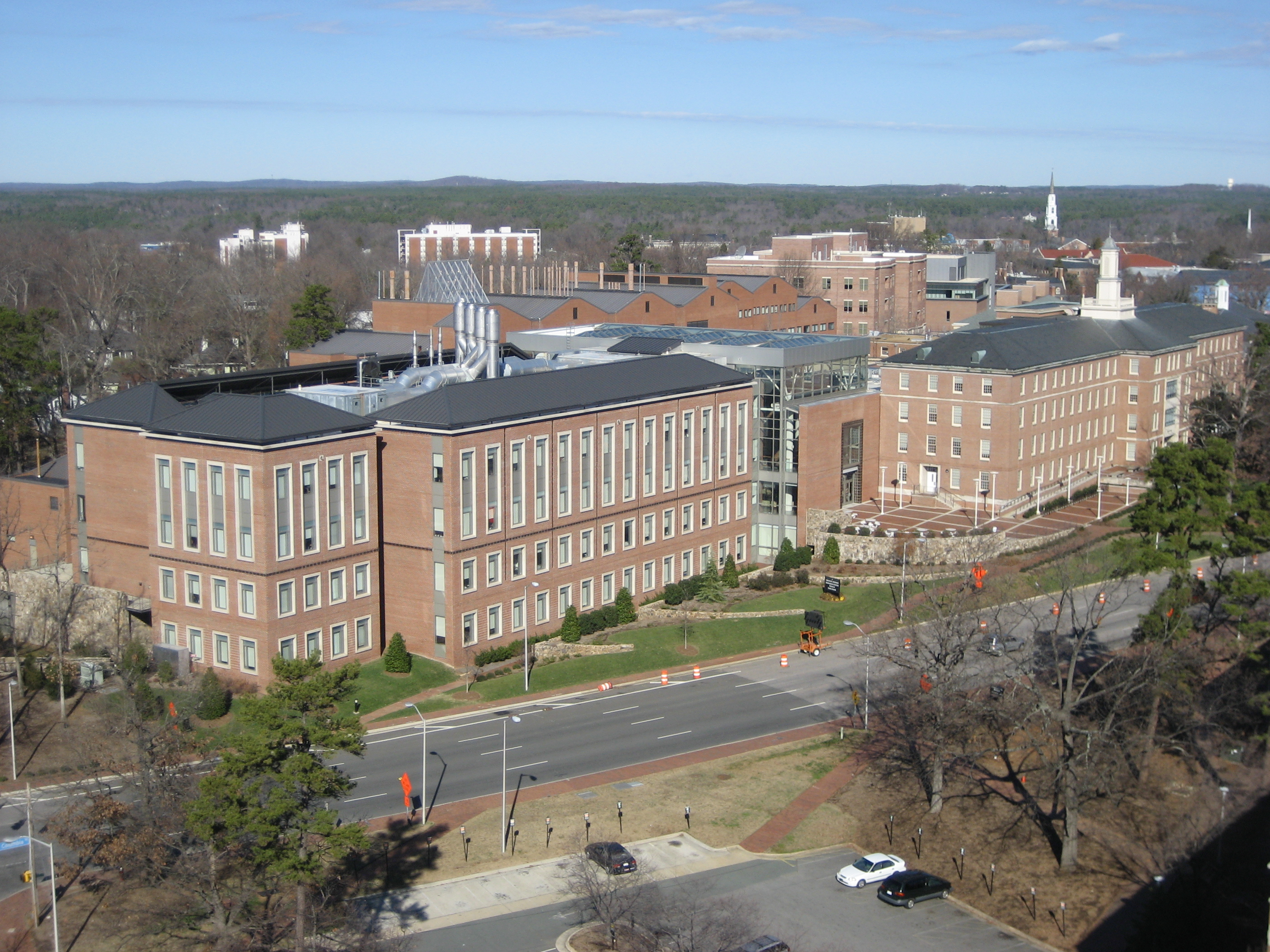
- Former name: UNC School of Public Health
- Preceding agency: UNC Division of Public Health (1936-1939)
- Type: Public school of public health
- Established: 1940
- Parent institution: University of North Carolina at Chapel Hill
- Dean: Nancy Messonnier
- Faculty: 547
- Students: 1,545
- Doctoral students: 535
- Location: Chapel Hill, North Carolina, United States
- Website: sph.unc.edu

The UNC Gillings School of Global Public Health is the public health school at the University of North Carolina at Chapel Hill, a public university in Chapel Hill, North Carolina. It offers undergraduate and graduate degrees and is accredited by the Council on Education for Public Health.

In 2022, the institution was ranked the best public school and tied for second best school overall in the U.S. News & World Report ranking of American schools of public health. Among schools of public health, the school receives the third most funding in NIH awards.

== History ==
The UNC Division of Public Health was organized in 1936 within the UNC School of Medicine. Separate status as a school of public health was granted in 1940, making the school the first school of public health established within a state university. The school awarded its first graduate degrees in 1940.

Milton Rosenau became the first director of the Division of Public Health in 1936 and served as the first dean of the School from 1939 to 1946. In 1949, both the UNC School of Dentistry and UNC School of Nursing were added. Along with the Schools of Public Health, Medicine and Pharmacy, the five schools formally became the University's Division of Health Affairs.

The school was named after donors Joan Gillings and Dennis Gillings, a former biostatistics instructor at UNC Chapel Hill and the founder of IQVIA.

In 2018, the Gillings School launched its online Master of Public Health program.

In 2020, the school focused its resources on combating the spread of the COVID-19 global pandemic, with various research teams tackling a broad range of topics including vaccines, testing, epidemiology, biostatistics, health policy and more.

== Notable faculty ==
- Mandy Cohen, physician who served as the 20th director of the U.S. Centers for Disease Control and Prevention from 2023 to 2025
- Nabarun Dasgupta, epidemiologist and MacArthur Fellow
- Clarence Lushbaugh, physician and pathologist
- William L. Roper, dean emeritus, 12th Director of the CDC

== Alumni ==
- Lisa Bodnar (M.P.H. 1999), Vice-Chair for Research, University of Pittsburgh
- Dr. Will Bulsiewicz (Epidemiology Fellow), Author and researcher plant-based nutrition
- Julie Story Byerley (M.P.H. 1998), Vice Dean for Education, UNC School of Medicine
- Garry Conille (M.P.H. 1999), 15th Prime Minister of Haiti
- Wen-Yi Huang (Ph.D. 1998), cancer epidemiologist and staff scientist at the National Cancer Institute
- Renee M. Johnson (M.P.H. 1998, Ph.D. 2004), researcher and academic, Johns Hopkins Bloomberg School of Public Health
- Jonathan J. Juliano (M.P.H. 1997), researcher and academic, UNC School of Medicine
- Jerry M. Linenger (M.P.H. 1989, Ph.D. 1989), former captain in the U.S. Navy Medical Corps, and former NASA astronaut
- Heather Munroe-Blum (Ph.D.), former Principal and Vice-Chancellor, McGill University
- Vann R. Newkirk II (M.Sc. 2012), staff writer, The Atlantic
- Rob Wittman (M.P.H. 1990), U.S. Representative for Virginia's 1st congressional district

== See also ==
- Carolina Population Center
