= Lisa Bodnar =

American nutritional and perinatal epidemiologist

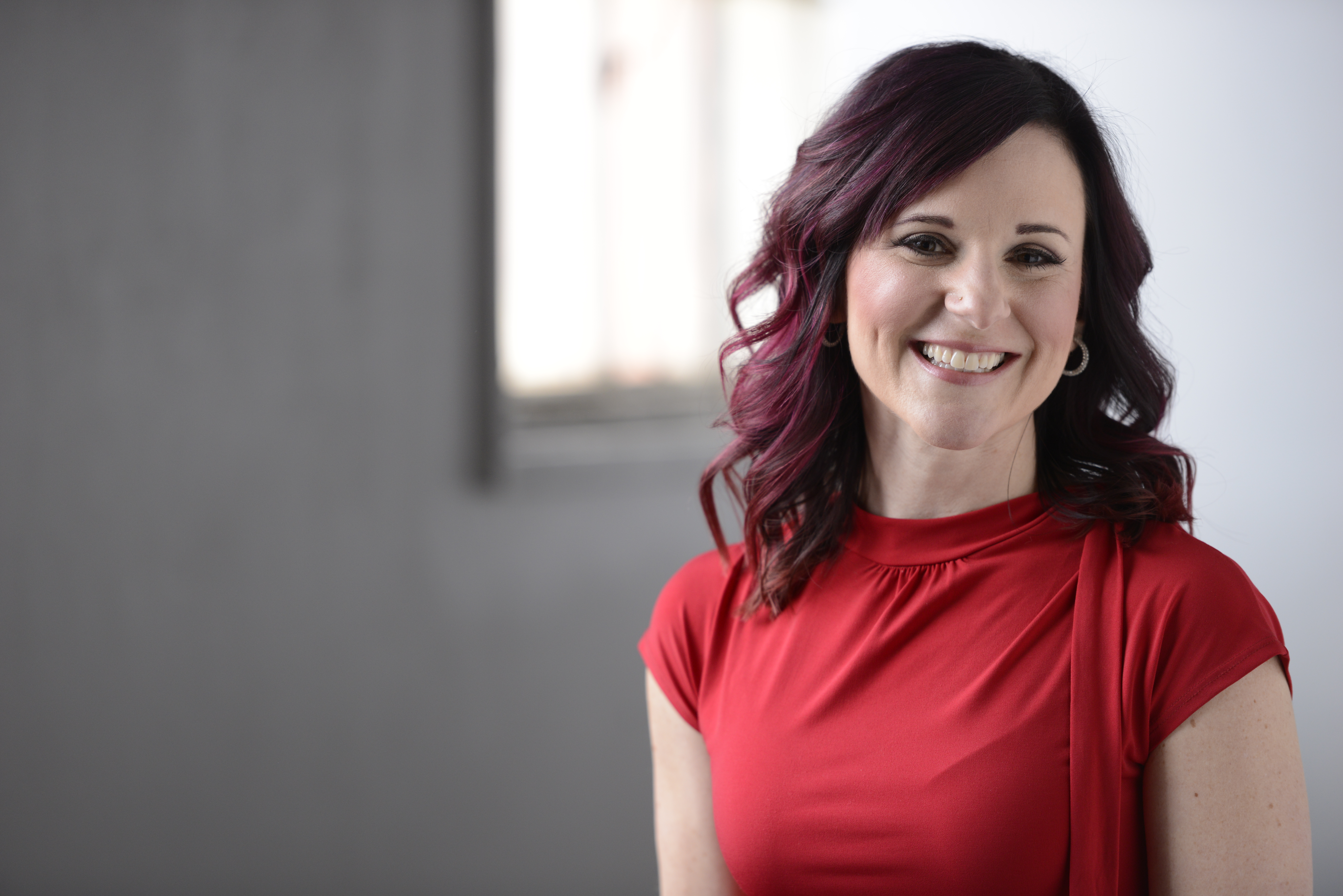
- Education: UNC Gillings School of Global Public Health (BS, MPH, PhD)
- Scientific career
- Workplaces: University of Pittsburgh

Lisa Bodnar is an American nutritional and perinatal epidemiologist. She is the Vice-Chair for Research and a tenured professor at University of Pittsburgh. Her research focuses on the contributions of pregnancy weight gain, dietary patterns, maternal obesity, and maternal vitamin D deficiency to adverse pregnancy and birth outcomes.

== Education ==
In 1998, Lisa M. Bodnar graduated summa cum laude with a Bachelor of Science in Public Health with a major in nutrition from University of North Carolina at Chapel Hill. She completed her dietetic internship at UNC Hospitals in 1998. She graduated with a Master of Public Health in the Department of Nutrition at UNC Gillings School of Global Public Health at the University of North Carolina at Chapel Hill in 1999. Bodnar earned a Doctor of Philosophy in nutrition with a minor in epidemiology from UNC Chapel Hill in 2002. From 2002 to 2004, she conducted her postdoctoral research in reproductive biology at Magee-Womens Research Institute and the University of Pittsburgh Medical Center.

== Career ==
Bodnar is a nutritional and perinatal epidemiologist. She is the Vice-Chair for Research and a tenured professor of epidemiology at University of Pittsburgh. Bodnar holds a secondary appointment in the Department of Obstetrics, Gynecology and Reproductive Sciences. She is a registered dietitian and licensed nutritionist in Pennsylvania.

Bodnar has contributed her experience to several national panels that set guidelines for nutrition during pregnancy, including the Institute of Medicine Committee to Reevaluate Pregnancy Weight Gain Guidelines, the National Academies of Medicine Committee on Scoping Existing Guidelines for Feeding Recommendations for Infants and Young Children Under Age 2, and the US Departments of Agriculture and Health and Human Services Pregnancy Working Group that will provide evidence for the 2020 Dietary Guidelines for Americans.

Her research has been cited over 11,000 times in journals published in 21 languages from 108 countries in all regions of the world. Her work has been used in 9 reports of the National Academy of Sciences, Engineering and Medicine, as well as key recommendations, practice guidelines or action statements from the American College of Obstetricians and Gynecologists, the U.S. Preventive Task Force, the American Public Health Association and the Agency for Healthcare Research and Quality, along with international agencies, including the World Health Organization.

== Awards ==
- Young Professional Achievement Award from the National Coalition for Excellence in Maternal and Child Health Epidemiology.
- University of Pittsburgh 2013 Chancellor's Distinguished Research Award in the Junior Scholar category.

== Selected works and publications ==
- Bodnar, Lisa M.; Catov, Janet M.; Simhan, Hyagriv N.; Holick, Michael F.; Powers, Robert W.; Roberts, James M. (2007). "Maternal Vitamin D Deficiency Increases the Risk of Preeclampsia". The Journal of Clinical Endocrinology & Metabolism. 92 (9): 3517–3522. doi:10.1210/jc.2007-0718. PMC 4288954. PMID 17535985.
- Bodnar, Lisa M.; Simhan, Hyagriv N.; Powers, Robert W.; Frank, Michael P.; Cooperstein, Emily; Roberts, James M. (2007). "High Prevalence of Vitamin D Insufficiency in Black and White Pregnant Women Residing in the Northern United States and Their Neonates". The Journal of Nutrition. 137 (2): 447–452. doi:10.1093/jn/137.2.447. PMC 4288960. PMID 17237325.
- Wisner, K. L.; Sit, D. K.Y.; Hanusa, B. H.; Moses-Kolko, E. L.; Bogen, D. L.; Hunker, D. F.; Perel, J. M.; Jones-Ivy, S.; Bodnar, L. M.; Singer, L. T. (2009). "Major Depression and Antidepressant Treatment: Impact on Pregnancy and Neonatal Outcomes". American Journal of Psychiatry. 166 (5): 557–566. doi:10.1176/appi.ajp.2008.08081170. PMC 4426499. PMID 19289451.
