= Sandra Carson =

American obstetrician who is the principal innovator of the first artificial human ovary

Sandra Ann Carson
- Education: Northwestern University Medical School (MD)
- Occupation(s): Doctor and researcher
- Known for: Inventing the first artificial human ovary

Sandra Ann Carson is an American obstetrician who is the principal innovator of the first artificial human ovary. This innovation was reported in the Journal of Assisted Reproduction and Genetics, and recognized by Time magazine as one of the top 10 medical breakthroughs in 2010.

In this work, Carson, et al. introduced theca cells donated by reproductive-age patients into "3-D Petri dishes" designed to resemble the sponge-like cells of a human ovary. In the lab, the cell types interacted with one another and functioned for all intents and purposes like a real ovary, even successfully maturing a human egg from its earliest stages in the follicle to a fully developed form.

To build the ovary, honeycombs of theca cells were formed, one of two key types in the ovary, donated by reproductive-age patients at Women & Infants Hospital of Rhode Island. Together with human egg cells, donated granulosa cells were inserted into the honeycomb shape the theca cells formed. In days, the theca cells enveloped the granulosa and eggs, mimicking a real ovary.

Clinically, the artificial ovary could play a significant role in the future, eventually yielding new infertility treatments for women by preserving the fertility of cancer patients, for example: immature eggs could be salvaged and frozen before chemotherapy or radiation, and then matured outside the patient in the artificial ovary.

In parallel with this effort and a scientific first, Carson co-directed a research team by extracting information about gene expression from fertile human egg cells without hurting them. In this work the team was able to sequence the transcribed genetic material, or mRNA, in egg cells, in smaller structures pinched off from them called polar bodies. Polar bodies are nonfunctional and incapable of being fertilized. This new technique could ultimately give parents and doctors a preview of which eggs are likely to make the most viable embryos.

== Education ==
Carson earned her medical degree from Northwestern University Medical School in 1977 and completed her residency there in 1981. She completed a fellowship in reproductive endocrinology at Michael Reese Hospital and the University of Chicago Medical Center. She is a diplomate of the American Board of Obstetrics and Gynecology with subspecialty certification in reproductive endocrinology and infertility.

== Career ==
Carson has served as the chair of REI Board of the American Board of Obstetrics and Gynecology (ABOG) and chair of the US Food and Drug Administration (FDA) Advisory Committee for Reproductive Health Drugs. She currently serves as editor-in-chief of Sexuality, Reproduction and Menopause.

From 2007 to 2014, Carson was a professor of obstetrics and gynecology at Warren Alpert Medical School of Brown University and served as Director of the Division of Reproductive Endocrinology and Infertility. She was appointed as Vice President of Education with the American Congress of Obstetricians and Gynecologists (ACOG) from March 2013 to August 2018.

Carson joined Yale School of Medicine as a professor of obstetrics, gynecology, and reproductive sciences and director of the Reproductive Endocrinology and Infertility (REI) section in February 2019.

== Public awareness ==
Carson serves as a news consultant for various television networks and contributor for print publications including: CBS, CNN, ABC, NBC, 20/20, Time magazine, Parents magazine, and Mademoiselle.
