= Geisinger College of Health Sciences =

Private medical school in Pennsylvania, United States

Coordinates: 41.41312°N 75.65586°W

- Motto: Together, we will change the future.
- Type: Private medical school
- Established: 2008; 18 years ago
- Parent institution: Geisinger Health System
- Affiliations: AAMC
- Dean: Julie Story Byerley
- Faculty: 1000+
- Administrative staff: 150
- Students: 525
- Location: Scranton, Wilkes-Barre, Danville, Sayre, Atlantic City, New Jersey, United States

Geisinger College of Health Sciences (GCHS) is the education and research arm of Geisinger, a health care system based in Pennsylvania. Formed in 2022, the college serves as an umbrella organization for Geisinger Commonwealth School of Medicine, Geisinger School of Graduate Education, Geisinger School of Nursing, graduate medical education, faculty development and the health system's research programs.

Julie Story Byerley is president of the college and dean of Geisinger Commonwealth School of Medicine. She also serves as Geisinger's executive vice president and chief academic officer. City & State Pennsylvania credited Byerley with overseeing the consolidation of the medical school with Geisinger's nursing and research divisions.

== History ==
=== Research ===
Investigations into diabetes and other conditions began a year after Geisinger's founding in 1915. Throughout the 20th and 21st century Geisinger Research expanded its scope, footprint, and funding sources. As an early adopter of electronic health records and genetic biobanking, the research arm of Geisinger's College of Health Sciences has been among the vanguard health systems leading precision health initiatives such as MyCode and contributing to similar international initiatives, such as PsycheMERGE. The Research Institute hosts many departments and centers dedicated to a wide range of clinical research and learning health science.

=== Education ===
The foundation of GCSOM, formerly known as The Commonwealth Medical College (TCMC), began with the establishment of the Northeastern Pennsylvania Medical Education Development Consortium (MEDC) in 2004. The consortium included business, medical, community, and government representatives. After acquiring funding from the Commonwealth of Pennsylvania, Blue Cross of Northeastern Pennsylvania, and other state, federal and private philanthropic sources, the Commonwealth Medical Education Corporation was formed. In the spring of 2007, Robert M. D’Alessandri began his tenure as president and founding dean.

Commonwealth was awarded degree-granting authority by the Commonwealth of Pennsylvania in 2008 and received preliminary accreditation by the Liaison Committee on Medical Education (LCME) in 2008. D'Alessandri resigned from his position as dean and president in April 2011. In June 2011, the LCME placed the college on probation due to financial stability concerns. Provisional accreditation was granted in 2012, with full accreditation granted in June 2014. In June 2014, the college was also granted full accreditation by the Middle States Commission on Higher Education (MSCHE). The college accepted its first class of medical and master's students in 2009. TCMC graduated its first MD and fourth MBS classes in May 2013.

==== Geisinger Aquisition ====
On September 28, 2016, Geisinger Health System announced it had acquired the Commonwealth Medical College. The acquisition integrated aspects of the health system, such as residency training programs, into TCMC, and also introduced new Master's programs. Additionally, TCMC was renamed Geisinger Commonwealth School of Medicine.

In September 2021, Geisinger announced that Julie Byerley, M.D., M.P.H., will serve as the new president and dean of the Geisinger Commonwealth School of Medicine, executive vice president and chief academic officer, effective January 1, 2022. She succeeds Steven Scheinman, M.D., who has served as the president and dean of the School of Medicine since 2012.

In September 2022, Geisinger's educational and research programs were brought together under the newly formed Geisinger College of Health Sciences. Geisinger Commonwealth remained the name of the medical school within the broader college.

==== Admissions & Academics ====
Entry into the Geisinger Commonwealth School of Medicine is competitive, with 5,992 applications received for a class size of 111 in 2022. The MD Class of 2026 had an average MCAT score of 511.62 and GPA of 3.75 on admission. Twelve percent of the class is from groups historically underrepresented in medicine, and 71% of the 108 students in the class are from Pennsylvania. Twenty-nine percent of the class is specifically from northeastern Pennsylvania and north central Pennsylvania.

In 2021, the school launched the Total Health Curriculum, designed to align the medical school program with the Geisinger Health System. Graduates complete objectives in 6 major categories (patients, families and communities, professional identity, health system science, critical thinking, clinical skills, and knowledge for practice). The Total Health Curriculum is unique in that it includes 6 longitudinal themes (Social Justice and Health Equity, Health System Citizenship, Primary Care, Personal and Professional Development, Community Immersion and Population Health), intended to prepare graduates for 21st-century practice.
