= Isaac Arthur Abt =

American pediatrician and teacher

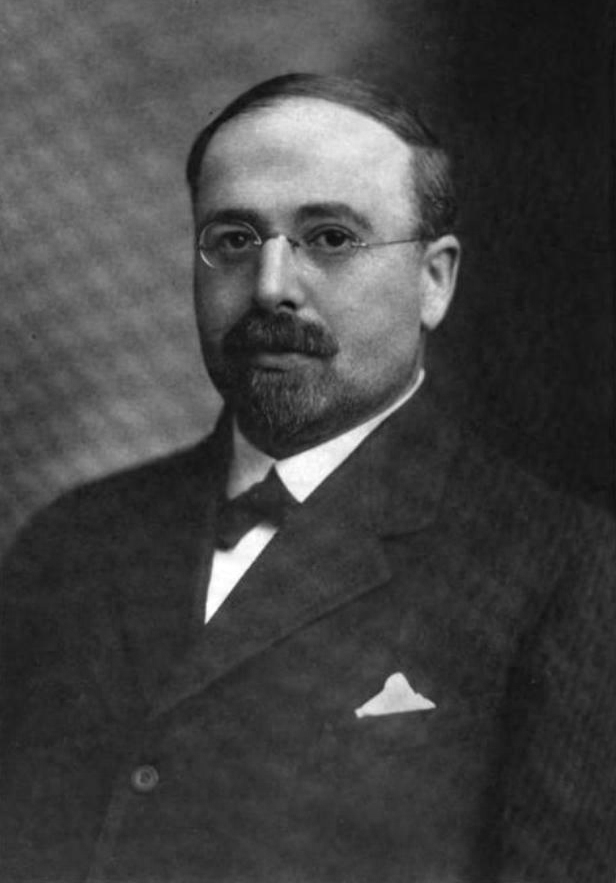
- Born: December 18, 1867; Wilmington, Illinois
- Died: November 22, 1955 (aged 87); Chicago, Illinois
- Burial place: Rosehill Cemetery
- Occupation: Pediatrician
- Known for: Founding president of the American Academy of Pediatrics

Signature
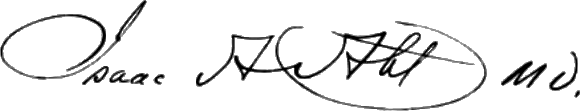

Isaac Arthur Abt (December 18, 1867 – November 22, 1955) was an American pediatrician and the first president of the American Academy of Pediatrics. He was one of the first U.S. physicians to specialize in pediatrics and he authored an influential textbook in the first part of the 20th century.

== Biography ==
Abt was born on December 18, 1867, to Levi and Henrietta Hart Abt in Wilmington, Will County, Illinois. He was a twin; the twins had two older brothers and three younger sisters. Abt's parents were German immigrants who had come to the United States almost 20 years before Isaac's birth. His father was a grocery store owner and postmaster.

As a small child, Abt lost a sister to diphtheria and a cousin to scarlet fever, which impacted his interest in medicine. As a teenager, Abt worked in a pharmacy, where his interest in medicine intensified. He attended West Division High School in Chicago, then went to Johns Hopkins University. At Johns Hopkins, Abt received guidance from pathologist William H. Welch. He then studied medicine at Chicago Medical College.

Abt completed an internship at Michael Reese Hospital. After that year, Abt went to Europe for postgraduate study at the same time as several of his medical school classmates, including Joseph DeLee. Abt worked with highly regarded physicians and scientists in Europe, including Theodor Escherich and Otto Heubner. He then worked at Rush Medical College and Northwestern University. He was heavily involved in the establishment of Sarah Morris Children's Hospital.

In 1897, he married a nurse from Michael Reese Hospital named Lina Rosenberg. They lived on Grand Avenue in Chicago, in an apartment above their friend Albert Henry Loeb, who was on his way to becoming a prominent attorney. Abt had two children, Arthur and Lawrence.

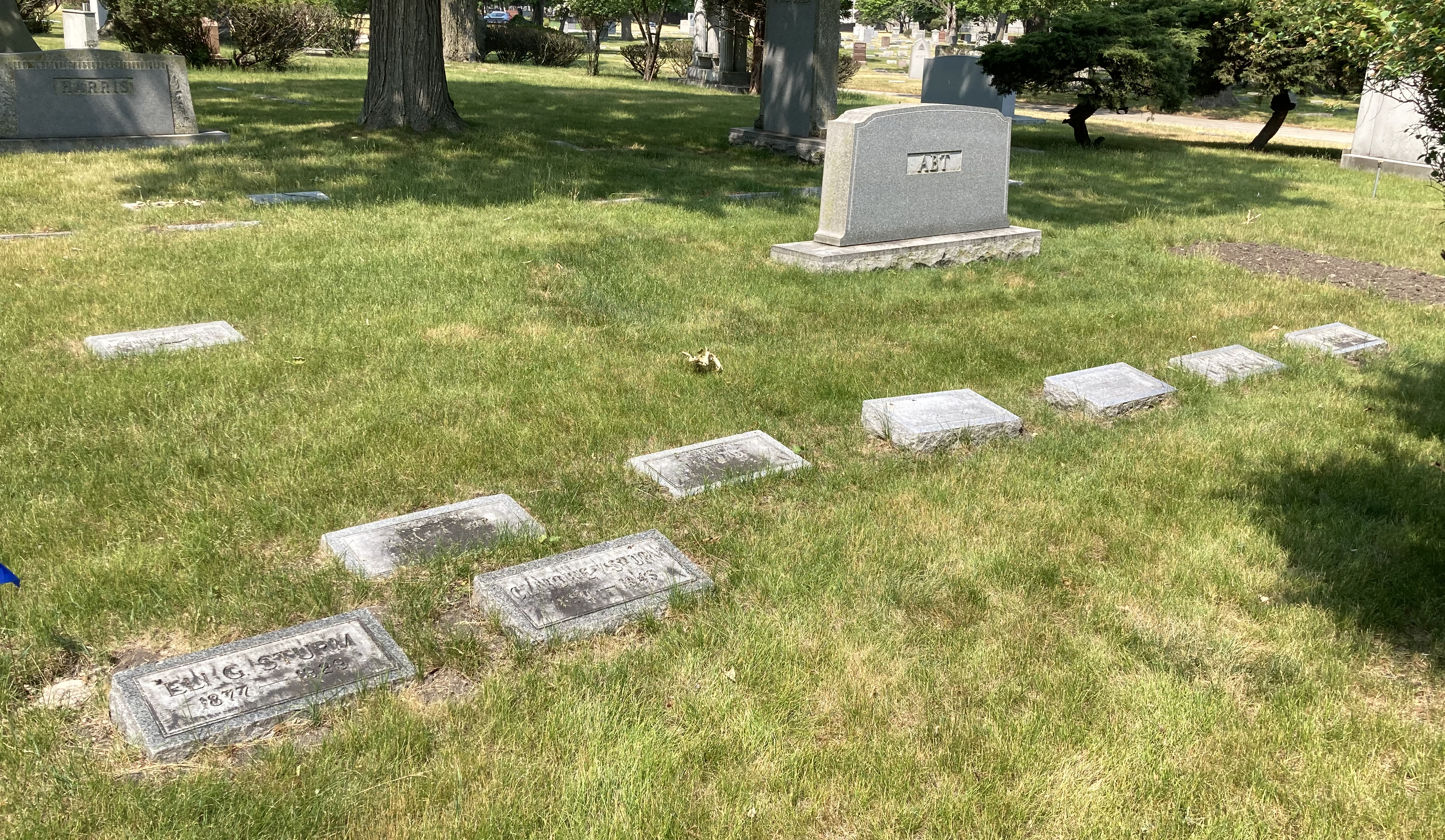
Abt's grave at Rosehill Cemetery

Abt served as president for several medical and scientific organizations, including the American Association for Teachers of the Diseases of Children, the American Pediatric Society and the Chicago Medical Society. He was the founding president of the American Academy of Pediatrics in 1931.

He died at his home in Chicago on November 22, 1955, and was buried at Rosehill Cemetery.

As of 2014, the medical school at Northwestern awards a named professorship in his honor, the Isaac A. Abt, MD, Professor of Kidney Diseases.

== Works ==
- Abt, Isaac A. (1944). Baby Doctor. London: Whittlesey House.
- Abt, Isaac A. (1944). The Baby's Food: Recipes for the Preparation of Food for Infants and Children.
