= John A. D. Cooper =

American physician

John Allen Dicks Cooper (December 22, 1918 – January 27, 2002) was an American physician and educator.

Cooper was born on December 22, 1918, in El Paso, Texas. He grew up in the bilingual and bicultural environment of Las Cruces, New Mexico and attended the New Mexico State University from which he graduated with his B.S. degree in chemistry in 1939. His interest in science and friendship with Dr. Robert J. McBride, a Las Cruces practitioner, were instrumental in his decision to pursue further education in the sciences. Dr. Cooper said, "Financially I wasn't able to go to medical school. But fellowships for graduate work were offered by a number of schools and I chose Northwestern." In 1943, he earned his Ph.D. in biochemistry. Dr. Cooper continued at Northwestern and served as a Biochemistry instructor there from 1943 to 1947 and as an assistant professor from 1947 to 1951. In 1951, he earned his M.D. from Northwestern.

This bilingual, bicultural background led to international involvement in the medical field; and for four months in 1956, Dr. Cooper lived in Brazil where he taught the first courses for medical doctors in radioisotopes and biology. Two years later, he lived in Argentina for four months and once again taught physicians about radioisotopes and biology. Cooper was single-handedly responsible for training most of the Latin doctors in these areas of medicine. Dr. Gabriel Velazquez-Palau, who was a visiting professor of social medicine at Harvard Medical School, once introduced Dr. Cooper as "the only Anglo-American Latin" he had ever met. Dr. Cooper pushed for forming a federation of medical colleges in South America. Although the idea was initially rejected, the Pan American Federation of Associations of Medical Schools (PAFAMS) was later formed and had a substantial effect on medical education. Dr. Cooper was on the board of PAFAMS from 1963 to 1976.

He also had a strong sense of service to both the medical community and the wider community it served. Dr. Cooper was an associate dean of the Northwestern Medical School from 1959 to 1963. He started the "Charter 25" program, which allowed students to begin medical training straight out of high school and become doctors in six rather than eight years. He directed this program and served as a full-time mentor to the program participants from 1960 to 1968. From 1962 to 1969, he served on the editorial board for the AAMC's Journal of Medical Education, was a member of the Illinois Board of Public Health Advisors, and was part of the Illinois Legislative Commission on Atomic Energy. Dr. Cooper became even more involved with the AAMC and medical education when in 1969 he was asked to become the first president of the Association of American Medical Colleges (AAMC), which up until then had been run by an Executive Director. Dr. Cooper helped bring the AAMC and its role in medical education to the forefront of the public's attention. He moved the AAMC's offices from Evanston, Illinois to Washington, D.C. shortly after assuming its presidency, and rapidly established the AAMC and himself as a credible voice for medical education and research. He grew the Association from a small staff in Evanston to a staff of several hundred in Washington, organizing and operating the MCAT test, the AMCAS centralized application service, and conducting leading-edge educational research. He also expanded the AAMC's role from one of a "dean's club" to one that also spoke for medical school faculty, researchers and hospital administrators. He also helped to organize the National Intern and Resident Matching Program. In 1981, he was named by U.S. News & World Report as one of the five most influential people in medicine and health education. Dr. Cooper retired from his position as AAMC president in 1986.

He was also a writer and a scholar, and throughout his life and career as a physician, Dr. Cooper published more than 300 articles on biomedical research, medical education, health policy, and medical care in both scientific and professional journals. He was also the recipient of a number of honorary degrees, including a Doctor of Science Degree from Duke University and an honorary Doctor of Medical Science Degree at the Medical College of Pennsylvania. Additionally, he received the Health Services Award by the Charleston Area Medical Center in May 1973. Dr. Cooper died on January 27, 2002, at the age of 84 in Birmingham, Alabama.
