= Catherine R. Lucey =

Internist, geriatrician, and medical educator

Academic background
- Education: MD, Feinberg School of Medicine

Catherine Reinis Lucey is an American internist, geriatrician, and medical educator.

== Early life and education ==
Following her graduation from the Feinberg School of Medicine, Lucey completed her internship and residency in internal medicine at the UCSF Medical Center. She then served as chief resident in internal medicine at the San Francisco General Hospital.

== Career ==
Lucey began her educational leadership role as a residency program director at the MedStar Washington Hospital Center. She was then recruited to Ohio State University as vice chair for education in the Department of Internal Medicine in 2002. She was subsequently promoted to vice dean for education in the College of Medicine in 2007. In her last year at Ohio State, she served as interim dean for the College of Medicine before leaving to join UCSF School of Medicine in 2011 as their Vice Dean of Education. Upon leaving for UCSF, she was also named Chair of the American Board of Internal Medicine Board of Directors.

Upon joining the faculty at UCSF, Lucey helped design the School of Medicine's new Bridges Curriculum and advocated for the use of education to advance the quality and safety of patient care. As a result, she was promoted to Executive Vice Dean for the School of Medicine and elected a member of the National Academy of Medicine in 2018. In 2021, Lucey was awarded the John A. Benson Jr., MD Professionalism Article Prize for her article "The Consequences of Structural Racism on MCAT Scores and Medical School Admissions: The Past Is Prologue." Throughout her professional career, Lucey has totaled 65 scientific publications.
