= Robert A. Kyle =

American pathologist (1928–2026)

Robert A. Kyle (March 17, 1928 – September 2, 2026) was an American pathologist who was a professor of medicine, Laboratory Medicine and Pathology at the Mayo Clinic. He specialized in the care of patients with plasma cell dyscrasias.

Throughout his career Kyle published more than 1,850 scientific papers and abstracts on myeloma and other plasma cell disorders. Some of Kyle's most notable scientific contributions include naming the disorder known as Monoclonal gammopathy of undetermined significance (MGUS) as well as establishing the epidemiology and long-term prognosis of MGUS.

== Education ==
- 1961 Hematology Research Fellowship – National Cancer Institute
- 1958 MS – University of Minnesota
- 1955 Internal Medicine Residency – Mayo Clinic
- 1953 Internship – Northwestern University Feinberg School of Medicine
- 1952 MD – Northwestern University Feinberg School of Medicine
- 1948 BS – University of North Dakota
- 1946 AA – Dakota College at Bottineau

== Personal life ==
=== Early life ===
Kyle grew up on a rural farm in North Dakota during the 1930s and 1940s. During this time he attended a one-room school house from which he graduated in 1944 at the age of 16. Shortly after graduating from high school he was almost drafted to serve in World War II, but shortly after he reported to Fort Snelling the U.S. made an official decision to no longer draft adolescents under the age of 18. Because of this, Robert was then able to return to the North Dakota school of Forestry and complete his AA degree.

=== Philately ===
Kyle first became interested in stamp collecting (philately) as a young boy, but it was not until he suffered a dislocated lumbar disc in 1965 that he found time to increase his stamp collecting activity. In the process of pursuing this interest he has received a number of awards including the John Brain Medal, the Myrtle Watt Award, and the award of Distinguished Topical Philatelist.

=== Death ===
Kyle died on September 2, 2026, at the age of 98.

== Notable awards ==
- 2009 – Lifetime Achievement Distinguished Lecturer – Mayo Clinic Alix School of Medicine
- 2008 – Wallace Coulter Lifetime Achievement Award – American Society of Hematology
- 2008 – Austin Weisberger Lectureship – Case Western Reserve University
- 2007 – David Karnofsky Award and Lecture – American Society of Clinical Oncology
- 2006 – Joseph Michaeli Award for Contributions to Myeloma – Weill Cornell Medicine
- 2005 – Celgene Career Achievement Award in Clinical Hematology – Celgene
- 2005 – Mayo Distinguished Alumni Award – Mayo Clinic Alix School of Medicine
- 2004 – Lifetime Achievement Award in Waldenstrom's Macroglobulinemia – International Waldenstrom's Macroglobulinemia Foundation
- 2003 – Honorary Doctorate – University of North Dakota
- 2003 – Lifetime Achievement Award – International Myeloma Foundation
- 2003 – E. Stephen Kurtides Lectureship – Northwestern University Feinberg School of Medicine
- 2003 – Honorary Member – Royal College of Pathologists
- 2001 – Award for Waldenstrom's Macroglobulinemia (1st Recipient) – Research Fund for Waldenstrom's Macroglobulinemia
- 2001 – Socius Honores Causa – Hungarian Section on Amyloidosis
- 2000 – Award for Excellence for Clinical Investigation – Mayo Clinic
- 2000 – Honorary Doctorate Degree in Medicine – Polacki Dzjaržauny Universitet
- 1999 – Karis Award – Mayo Clinic
- 1998 – Sioux Award – University of North Dakota
- 1996 – Mayo Distinguished Clinician Award – Mayo Foundation
- 1995 – Henry S. Plummer Distinguished Internist Award – Mayo Clinic
- 1991 – Waldenstrom Award for Myeloma Research – International Workshop for Myeloma
- 1987 – Golden Service Award – North Dakota State University
- 1981 – William H. Donner Professor of Medicine and Laboratory Medicine – Mayo Clinic College of Medicine and Science
- 1978 – Professor Pro Tempore – Walter Reed National Military Medical Center
