= Clara Raven =

American physician

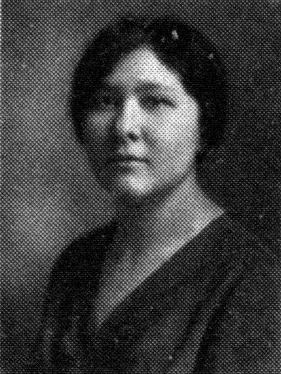
- 1928 University of Michigan yearbook portrait
- Born: April 6, 1905; Russia
- Died: May 2, 1994 (aged 89); Detroit, Michigan
- Education: University of Michigan (BA, MS); Northwestern University Medical School (MD)
- Occupations: Physician, pathologist, medical examiner
- Awards: Elizabeth Blackwell Award
- Military career
- Allegiance: United States
- Branch: Army Medical Corps
- Rank: Colonel
- Conflicts: World War II, Korean War

Clara Raven (April 6, 1905 – May 2, 1994) was an American physician who was a veteran of both World War II and the Korean War. She was also a pathologist and medical examiner, having put over twenty years of research into the causes of Sudden Infant Death Syndrome.

== Early life and education ==
Raven was born on April 6, 1905, in Russia. Her family emigrated to the United States in 1916, settling in Youngstown, Ohio before moving to Detroit, Michigan.

Raven earned her Bachelor of Arts and Master of Science in bacteriology from the University of Michigan. She enrolled at Duke Medical School and was the only female student in her class before transferring to Northwestern University Medical School. She received her Bachelor of Medicine in 1938 followed by her Doctor of Medicine in 1938. She did post-graduate work at the University of Liverpool, studying how typhoid fever spreads through drinking water.

== Career ==
Upon returning to the United States, Raven taught bacteriology at the Woman's Medical College of Pennsylvania. She was also Director of Laboratories at the Scranton State Hospital in Pennsylvania.

After the start of World War II, Raven tried to enlist in the army and was only accepted when women were legally allowed to serve in 1943. She enlisted in the United States Army Medical Corps in July, one of the first of five women physicians to be commissioned. Her wartime assignments included direction of both necropsy pathology and clinical pathology at laboratories in Japan, France, Germany, and Hawaii.

After the war, Raven served as the chief of laboratory services at Tripler Army Medical Center. She was also the Chief Pathologist at the Veterans Administration Hospital in Dayton, Ohio.

Raven returned to the Army Medical Corps in 1951 during the Korean War, becoming the highest ranking female physician on active duty. In 1961, she was awarded the rank of a full colonel, the first women physician in the Army Medical Corps to do so. Raven retired from active military service in 1959, entering the Army Reserve Medical Corps. She fully retired from the military in 1965.

Returning to civilian life, Raven was the deputy medical examiner in Wayne County, Michigan. She was unable to become the chief medical examiner; according to city council president Mary Beck: "She had all the qualifications. But there was always a man who got the job." During her time as deputy medical examiner, she researched the cause of Sudden Infant Death Syndrome, also known as SIDS. She testified before a Senate subcommittee to advocate for better funding into SIDS research as well as improving counseling services for the bereaved.

== Death and legacy ==
Raven died of cancer in Detroit on May 2, 1994.

In 1962, Raven received the Northwestern Alumni Merit Award, and received the Elizabeth Blackwell Award in 1983.

Raven was inducted into the Michigan Women's Hall of Fame in 1987.
