= Alan R. Nelson =

Former president of the American Medical Association

Alan R. Nelson, MD was president of the American Medical Association from 1989 to 1990, and led the development of several initiatives including the Health Access America Program. He was president of the World Medical Association from 1991 to 1992. Nelson earned his MD from Northwestern University Medical School in 1958. When the American College of Physicians and the American Society of Internal Medicine merged in 1998, Nelson headed its Washington office until January 2000. A member of the Institute of Medicine, he serves on its Roundtable on Environmental Health Sciences Research and Medicine.
