= Renee M. Johnson =

American academic

- Education: Spelman College (BA); UNC Gillings School of Global Public Health (MPH, PhD)
- Scientific career
- Fields: Mental health, adolescent health, LGBT health, health disparities
- Workplaces: Boston University School of Public Health; Harvard Injury Control Research Center; Johns Hopkins Bloomberg School of Public Health
- Thesis: Psychosocial Factors Associated with Women's Behavioral Intentions to Store Firearms Safely: An Application of the Theory of Planned Behavior (2004)
- Doctoral advisor: Carol W. Runyan

Renee M. Johnson is an American scientist specializing in the mental health of adolescents and young adults. She researches substance abuse, substance use epidemiology, and violence in marginalized youth including persons of color, LGBTQ, and immigrants. Johnson is an associate professor in the Johns Hopkins Bloomberg School of Public Health.

== Education ==
Renee M. Johnson completed a B.A. at Spelman College in 1996. She earned a M.P.H. (1998) and a Ph.D. (2004) in the department of health behavior and health education at the UNC Gillings School of Global Public Health. Her dissertation was titled, Psychosocial Factors Associated with Women's Behavioral Intentions to Store Firearms Safely: An Application of the Theory of Planned Behavior. Johnson's doctoral advisor was Carol W. Runyan.

Johnson was also a Yerby Fellow at the Harvard T.H. Chan School of Public Health from 2004 to 2006.

== Career ==
Johnson was an assistant professor at the Boston University School of Public Health from 2009 to 2013. She was also a visiting scientist at the Harvard Injury Control Research Center (2009-2014) and an investigator at the Harvard Youth Violence Prevention Center. Johnson is currently an associate professor in the department of mental health with a joint appointment in epidemiology at the Johns Hopkins Bloomberg School of Public Health, and a visiting scholar at the Colorado School of Public Health.

Johnson researches adolescent health and substance abuse and violence in marginalized groups including persons of color, LGBT youth, and immigrants.

In June 2020, Johns Hopkins University was awarded nearly $1M by the PhD Professional Development Innovation Initiative. Monies from the aware will be used to support programs in professional development for PhD students. A portion will be used to fund a four-part event series, on which Johnson collaborated, that provides "current and future doctoral students who are interested in the field of public mental and behavioral health with the range of potential non-academic career pathways".

== Honors and awards ==
- Johns Hopkins Bloomberg School of Public Health, Outstanding Teaching Faculty Award for "The Epidemiology of Substance Use and Related Problems" (2019)
- Johns Hopkins SOURCE Service-Learning Fellow (2019–20)
- Delta Omega Honorary Society in Public Health, Theta Chapter (2005)

== Selected works ==
- Runyan, Carol W.; Casteel, Carri; Perkis, David; Black, Carla; Marshall, Stephen W.; Johnson, Renee M.; Coyne-Beasley, Tamera; Waller, Anna E.; Viswanathan, Shankar (2005). "Unintentional injuries in the home in the United States". American Journal of Preventive Medicine. 28 (1): 73–79. doi:10.1016/j.amepre.2004.09.010. PMID 15626560.
- Almeida, Joanna; Johnson, Renee M.; Corliss, Heather L.; Molnar, Beth E.; Azrael, Deborah (2009). "Emotional Distress Among LGBT Youth: The Influence of Perceived Discrimination Based on Sexual Orientation". Journal of Youth and Adolescence. 38 (7): 1001–1014. doi:10.1007/s10964-009-9397-9. ISSN 0047-2891. PMC 3707280. PMID 19636742.
- Rothman, E. F.; McNaughton Reyes, L.; Johnson, R. M.; LaValley, M. (2012). "Does the Alcohol Make Them Do It? Dating Violence Perpetration and Drinking Among Youth". Epidemiologic Reviews. 34 (1): 103–119. doi:10.1093/epirev/mxr027. ISSN 0193-936X. PMC 3276314. PMID 22128086.
- Johnson, Renee M.; Fairman, Brian; Gilreath, Tamika; Xuan, Ziming; Rothman, Emily F.; Parnham, Taylor; Furr-Holden, C. Debra M. (2015). "Past 15-year trends in adolescent marijuana use: Differences by race/ethnicity and sex". Drug and Alcohol Dependence. 155: 8–15. doi:10.1016/j.drugalcdep.2015.08.025. PMC 4582007. PMID 26361714.
