= Louise Vincent =

American harm reduction advocate

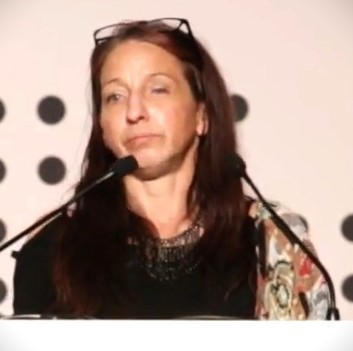
- Vincent speaks at the 2019 International Harm Reduction Conference
- Born: March 15, 1976; Greensboro, North Carolina, U.S.
- Died: August 31, 2025, (age 49); Greensboro North Carolina, U.S.
- Education: Greensboro College, BD in Sociology / U.N.C. Greensboro, MD in Public Health
- Known for: Harm reduction advocate, academic writing
- Children: 2

Louise Mae Beale Vincent (March 15, 1976 – August 31, 2025) was an American harm reduction activist. She founded or worked with multiple groups in the Greensboro, North Carolina area, such as the Urban Survivors Union.

== Early life ==
Vincent was born in 1976 and grew up in Greensboro, North Carolina, where she lived most of her life. She experienced substance use at a young age and would later speak candidly about how her lived experience informed her understanding of drug policy, stigma, and harm reduction. Vincent often described her early years as marked by instability and social marginalization, factors that would later inform her work building peer-run support systems for people who use drugs. After treatment and pursuing recovery, she earned a Master of Public Health degree, combining her personal experience with formal training in public health.

== Career and education ==
Vincent earned a bachelor's degree in sociology from Greensboro College in 2005, and later attended the University of North Carolina Greensboro, earning a Master of Public Health (2013). Vincent published several academic papers during her Masters.

While at the University of North Carolina Greensboro, Vincent worked on a needle-exchange program. In 2013, she was involved in a hit and run accident while crossing the street. As a result of this accident, Vincent lost her left eye and had one of her legs amputated.

After graduating University of North Carolina Greensboro, Vincent started the North Carolina Survivors Union, the first harm reduction program for drug users in North Carolina. The program provided support for active drug users, safe drug testing, needle and syringe exchanges, and other harm reduction related support services.

== Influence and personal life ==
Vincent was nationally recognized for her honesty and openness about her experiences as a person who used drugs. She often spoke about the need for dignity, community, and mutual support, referring to the harm-reduction movement as her calling, both professional and personal. Vincent was a mother, and much of her work took into account her experiences raising a family while facing structural barriers due to addiction, poverty, and stigma. In their work with her outside of public health, people remember her sense of humor, straightforwardness, and fierce loyalty to the communities she served. She collaborated frequently with Nabarun Dasgupta. Vincent died on August 31, 2025, after complications related to chronic health conditions, just days before her collaborator was awarded the MacArthur Fellowship.
