= Michael Mulholland =

Michael W. Mulholland is an American surgeon who is Professor of Surgery and the Chairman of the Department of Surgery at the University of Michigan.

== Biography ==
Mulholland was educated at Northwestern University in Evanston, Illinois and gained his medical degree from Northwestern University Medical School in Chicago. This was followed by postgraduate training in General Surgery at the University of Minnesota in Minneapolis, where he also gained his Ph.D. From 1985-1988, Mulholland was an Assistant Professor of Surgery at the University of Washington in Seattle. He joined the faculty at the University of Michigan in 1988. Dr. Mulholland is now the Frederick A. Coller Distinguished Professor of Surgery, and Chair, Department of Surgery

Mulholland's area of specialization is in laparoscopic surgery and surgical endoscopy, including the treatment of pancreatic and biliary cancer, neoplastic diseases of the gastrointestinal tract, biliary reconstruction and inflammatory bowel disease. His research interests include the neurocrine control of pancreatic exocrine secretion and enteric neurobiology.

Mulholland has co-authored or edited several books and was elected as a member of the National Academy of Sciences in 2004.

== Bibliography ==
- Essentials of Surgery: Scientific Principles and Practice
- Surgery: Scientific Principles & Practice + Review for Surgery
- Digestive Tract Surgery: A Text and Atlas
- Greenfield's Surgery: Scientific Principles And Practice
- Complications in Surgery
