= Michael S. Parmacek =

American cardiologist

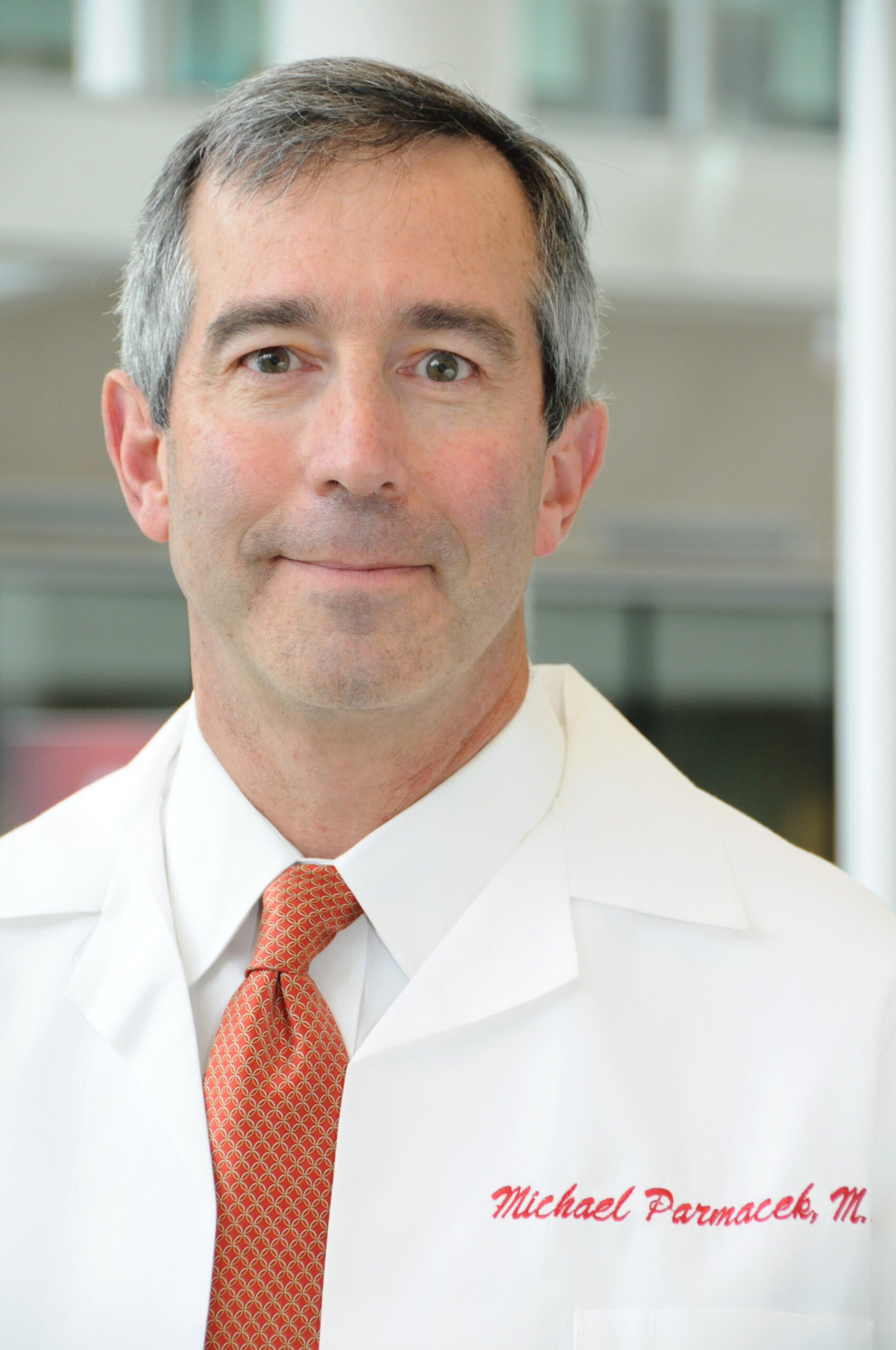
- Born: Coronado, California
- Education: Tufts University (B.S.); Northwestern University (M.D.)
- Awards: National Academy of Medicine (member); American Society for Clinical Investigation (member); Association of American Physicians (member)
- Scientific career
- Fields: Molecular Cardiology, Cardiovascular Development
- Workplaces: Perelman School of Medicine
- Website: https://www.med.upenn.edu/apps/faculty/index.php/g275/p8244

Michael S. Parmacek, M.D., is an American cardiologist and academic. He holds the Frank Wister Thomas Professorship in Medicine and serves as Chair of the Department of Medicine at the Perelman School of Medicine at the University of Pennsylvania.

== Career ==
Before joining the University of Pennsylvania, Parmacek was part of the faculty at the University of Michigan's Department of Medicine (Cardiology) from 1987 to 1992, and subsequently at the University of Chicago from 1992 to 1998.

In 1998, Parmacek was recruited to Penn, where he was appointed Chief of the Division of Cardiovascular Medicine. He served in this capacity until 2014. In 2005, he became the founding director of the University of Pennsylvania Cardiovascular Institute (CVI), a role he held until 2016. In 2014, he was appointed as the 25th Chair of Penn's Department of Medicine, the first such department established in the United States.

Parmacek served on the Advisory Council of the National Heart, Lung, and Blood Institute of the NIH from 2009 to 2013 and has been a member of Pennsylvania's Health Research Advisory Council.

== Honors ==
- 1998 Elected Member, American Society for Clinical Investigation
- 2001 Fellow, American Heart Association
- 2004 Elected Member, Association of American Physicians (AAP)
- 2004 Elected Member, American Clinical and Climatological Association (ACCA)
- 2016 Feinberg School of Medicine Distinguished Alumni Award, Northwestern University
- 2017 Elected Member, National Academy of Medicine
- 2020 Fellow, American College of Cardiology
- 2021 Fellow, American College of Physicians
