= Nabarun Dasgupta =

Prominent street drug scientist, epidemiologist, and harm reduction advocate

- Education: Princeton University (A.B.); Yale University (MPH); University of North Carolina (PhD)
- Awards: NC Dogwood Award (2026); Time 100 Health (2026); MacArthur Fellowship (2025); Time 100 Next (2023)
- Scientific career
- Fields: Epidemiology
- Workplaces: University of North Carolina at Chapel Hill

Nabarun Dasgupta is an Indian-born American epidemiologist and harm reduction advocate known for his work in overdose prevention. He currently serves as a Senior Scientist and Gillings Innovation Fellow at the University of North Carolina at Chapel Hill. He received the MacArthur Fellowship in 2025, and was named to the Time 100 Next in 2023 and the Time 100 Health in 2026.

== Biography ==
Dasgupta was born in India but moved to the United States as a baby. He grew up in Maine, graduating from Greely High School. He intended to go to medical school, but during his studies for his undergraduate degree in molecular biology, failed both physics and organic chemistry. He retook the classes, but he began rethinking his path. A summer internship helping with a study on OxyContin abuse determined his path as being in harm reduction and overdose prevention. He earned a MPH from Yale University and a PhD in pharmacoepidemiology from the University of North Carolina.

In 2007, he co-founded Epidemico, Inc., a health informatics startup based out of Boston Children's Hospital of Harvard Medical School along with John Brownstein and Clark Freifeld, which was acquired by Booz Allen Hamilton. As the Chief Science Officer of Epidemico, he helped develop mobile apps and social media analysis technology for pharmacovigilance to enhance greater patient participation in pharmaceutical regulation, in the United States and Europe.

In 2008, he co-founded Project Lazarus in Wilkes County, a community-wide intervention, which included the first provision of naloxone to prevent overdoses among people primarily using prescription opioids, along with Rev. Fred Brason and others. The program is credited with drastically reducing overdose deaths locally.

In 2021, along with Maya Doe-Simkins and Eliza Wheeler, he co-founded Remedy Alliance/For The People, a non-profit which provides free and low-cost bulk naloxone to public health organizations and agencies.

He works as a senior scientist and the Gillings Innovation Fellow at the University of North Carolina at Chapel Hill. He also leads the Street Drug Analysis Lab at UNC. He is an Associate Editor at the American Journal of Public Health.

He was awarded a MacArthur Fellowship in 2025 for his work in overdose prevention and harm reduction.

He worked in collaboration with Louise Vincent, who died just days before he was informed he received the MacArthur Fellowship.

He was named to the Time 100 Next in 2023 and to the Time 100 Health in 2026. He received the North Carolina Attorney General's Dogwood Award in 2026.
