= Edmund Andrews (surgeon) =

American doctor, a pioneer in surgery and medical educator

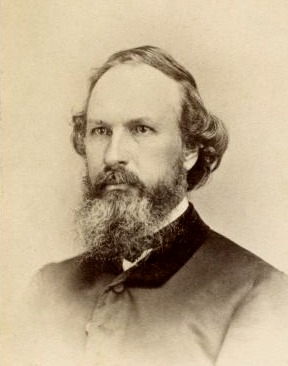
- Andrews in 1869
- Born: April 22, 1824; Putney, Vermont, US
- Died: January 22, 1904 (aged 79); Chicago, Illinois, US
- Resting place: Graceland Cemetery
- Education: Columbia University; University of Michigan
- Known for: Orthopedic surgery

Edmund Andrews (April 22, 1824 – January 22, 1904) was an American doctor, a pioneer in surgery and medical education of the Western United States. He was one of the founders of the Medical Department of the Northwestern University.

== Biography ==
Andrews was born in Putney, Vermont, a son of Betsy Lathrop and Rev. Elisha D. Andrews, the Congregational minister of that town. There, and in Rochester, New York, he received his preliminary education. He was from the first devoted to botany and geology. At the age of 17 his family moved to central Michigan. While studying at the University of Michigan he excelled in mathematics and natural sciences and was made president of the literary society of his college. He graduated with the degree of B.A. in 1849. He entered the office of Dr. Z. Pitcher, Detroit, in 1850, and attended lectures in the Medical Department of the University of Michigan. At the end of his first year he was made demonstrator of anatomy; received his degree in medicine in the following year, 1851, and was then made lecturer in comparative anatomy. He received his degree of Master of Arts in 1852 from the university, and two years later was made professor of comparative anatomy. He was one of the founders of the Michigan State Medical Society, and in 1853 began the publication of the Peninsular Journal of Medical and Collateral Sciences.

In 1855 he was appointed demonstrator of anatomy in Rush Medical College, but resigned after one year and devoted himself to practice, especially to surgery. Soon after his arrival in Chicago he aided in founding the Chicago Academy of Science, and was its first president, serving several times in this capacity. A short time after this he, in connection with Dr. Horace Wardner, established a charity dispensary, and a private dissecting room, where he taught a class in anatomy. He was one of the founders of the Chicago Medical College, and was its first professor of surgery. This latter position he held actively or emeritus up to his death. He was also surgeon to the Mercy Hospital. When the Civil War broke out he was made surgeon of the First Illinois Light Artillery, but after a year was obliged to resign by reason of illness incurred in the service. He was the first to make and keep complete medical records of the sick and wounded in war, and his records were accepted by the surgeon general and formed the basis on which records of that office have since been kept. He was a pioneer in practical antisepsis, and was the first man in the west to employ Lister's method after its exploitation.

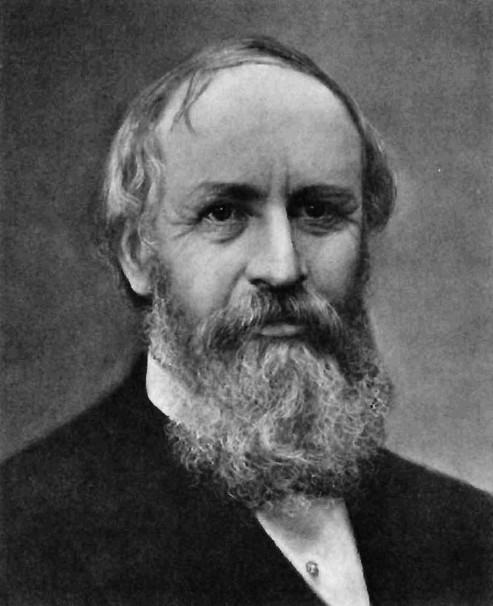
Edmund Andrews

Andrews was for many years a member of the American Medical Association, Michigan State Medical Society, Illinois State Medical Society, the Chicago Medical Society, the American Association for the Advancement of Science, the Chicago Academy of Science, Wisconsin Academy of Science, etc. For a number of years he was a trustee of Northwestern University. He contributed largely to medical literature. Andrews collected and published statistics of 92,815 cases of ether anesthesia and 117,078 cases of chloroform anesthesia, showing the relative risk in the use of these two agents.

Andrews was a lifelong member of the Presbyterian Church, and a constant contributor to religious periodicals, his chief topic being the harmony of science and religion.

Although he had suffered from enlarged prostate and cystitis for two or three years he attended to his professional work until the day before he went to the hospital for operation. In January 1904, he was operated by his sons for a bladder stone. He recovered after operation well, but then on January 22, he had a sudden attack of vertigo and died in about an hour.

Outside of his work in medicine, Dr. Andrews was a geologist of repute, and his work on the early glacial history of North America has been very largely quoted. His papers on geologic subjects have been published in the Proceedings and Transactions of the Chicago Academy of Science and in Silliman's Journal. Once only has he found time to cross the Atlantic, in 1867, when he visited the colleges and hospitals of London and Paris.

== Family ==
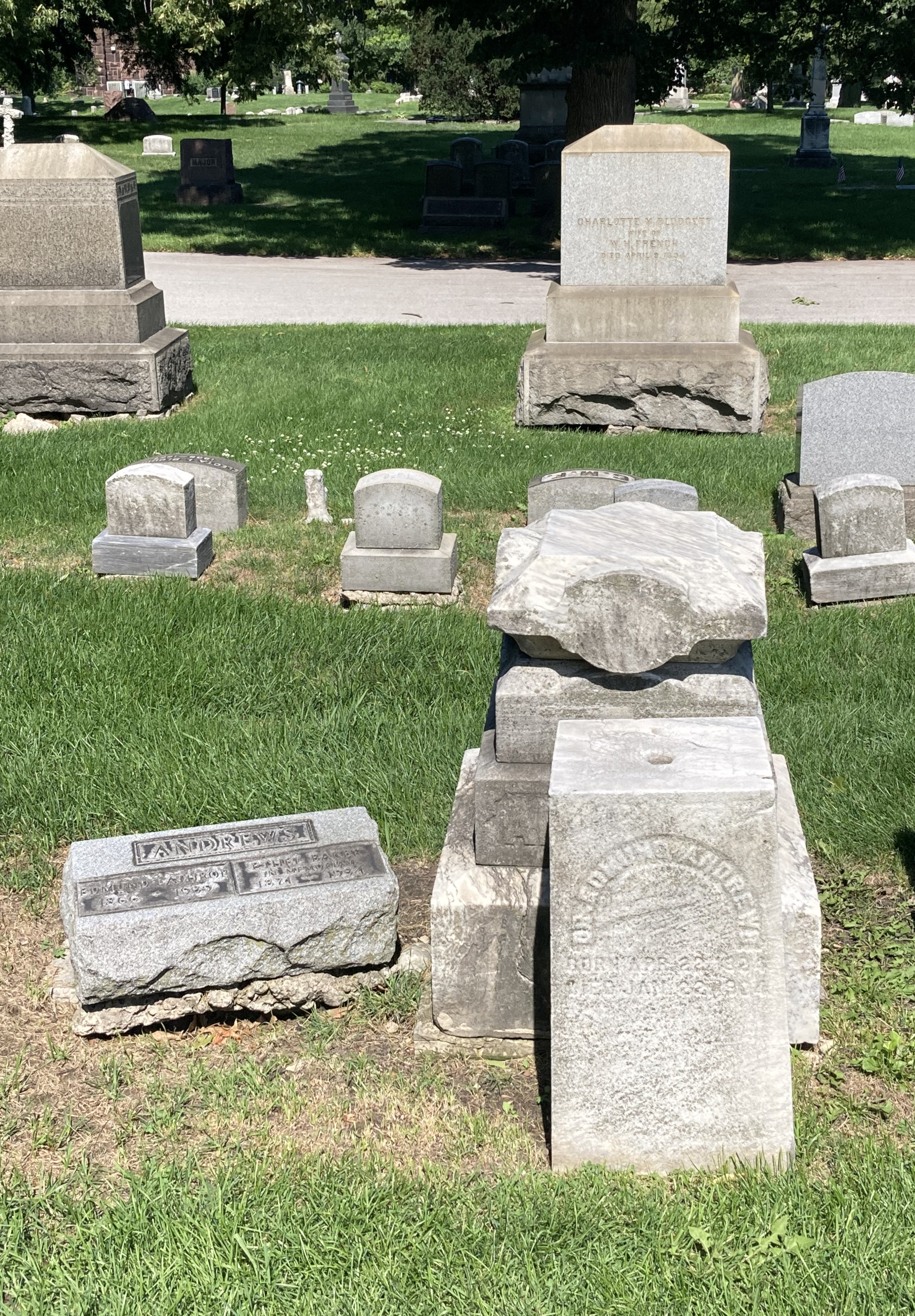
Andrews' grave at Graceland Cemetery

Andrews was married on April 13, 1853, to Sarah Eliza Taylor of Detroit. Together, they had five sons: Charles Taylor (who died at age 2); Leo Herbert (who died at age 7); Edward Wyllys Andrews, MD (1856-1927); Frank Taylor Andrews, MD (1858-1940); and Edmund Lathrop Andrews, Jr. (1866-1939). Sara Eliza died On June 5, 1875. In 1877, Andrews married her widowed sister, Frances M. Barrett. Frances Barrett Andrews had two daughters from a prior marriage: Laura Taylor Barrett Windett and Miriam (middle name unknown). Edmund Lathrop Andrews was survived by three sons and two daughters, which would include his and Sarah Eliza's sons and Frances Barrett's daughters by her first husband.

Edmund Andrews died at Mercy Hospital in Chicago on January 22, 1904, and was buried at Graceland Cemetery.
