= McGaw Medical Center =

Hospital consortium in Illinois, US

McGaw Medical Center of Northwestern University

Geography
- Location: Chicago, Illinois, United States

Organization
- Type: Teaching
- Affiliated university: Northwestern University; Feinberg School of Medicine

Services
- Emergency department: Level I trauma center
- Beds: 2,224

History
- Opened: 1966

Links
- Website: www.mcgaw.northwestern.edu
- Lists: Hospitals in Illinois

The McGaw Medical Center of Northwestern University is a consortium of urban, suburban, specialized, and general hospitals and Northwestern University. The member hospitals of the center have a total bed capacity of more than 2200.

== Education ==
Chartered in 1966 and honoring the generosity of the late Foster G. McGaw and Mary McGaw, the center presents a greater range of clinical and research experiences than individual teaching hospitals are able to provide. The various hospitals support both independent and cooperative programs. Almost all members of the medical staffs have faculty appointments at Northwestern University's Feinberg School of Medicine and serve as important links between medical education and medical practice.

== Members ==
Members of the McGaw Medical Center include:

- Northwestern University Feinberg School of Medicine
- Northwestern Memorial Hospital
- Lurie Children's Hospital
- Shirley Ryan AbilityLab

== Honors ==
The hospitals of the McGaw Medical Center consistently rank among the nation's best by U.S. News & World Report, which in 2007 noted eleven specialties in which the hospitals excelled. Five of these specialties are currently ranked in the top 20 nationally.
