= List of Alpha Omega Alpha members =

Alpha Omega Alpha is an honor society in the field of medicine. It has 132 active chapters in the United States. In 2025, it had initiated more than 200,000 members. Following are some of its notable members.

== Academia ==
=== Presidents and chancellors ===
Name	Chapter	Initiation year	Notability	Ref.
Haroutune Armenian	American University of Beirut Faculty of Medicine	1979	President of the American University of Armenia	
David Baltimore	Honorary	1987	President of the California Institute of Technology and recipient of the Nobel Prize in Physiology or Medicine 1975	
Carol Black	Honorary	2003	Principal of Newnham College, Cambridge and physician specialising in rheumatology	
Walter Bodmer	Honorary	1988	Chancellor of the University of Salford	
Julie Story Byerley	UNC School of Medicine	2008	President and dean of Geisinger Commonwealth School of Medicine	
Michael A. Caligiuri	Ohio State University College of Medicine	2008	President of the City of Hope National Medical Center	
Francisco G. Cigarroa	University of Texas Southwestern Medical School	1982	Chancellor of the University of Texas System	
Benno C. Schmidt Jr.	Honorary	1978	President of Yale University and dean of Columbia Law School	
Edward C. Halperin	Yale School of Medicine	1979	Chancellor and CEO of New York Medical College	
Frank Harrison	University of Texas Southwestern Medical School	1953	President of the University of Texas at Arlington and the University of Texas Health Science Center at San Antonio	
Raymond Hoffenberg	Honorary	2001	President of Wolfson College, Oxford and endocrinologist	
J. Larry Jameson	UNC School of Medicine	1981	President of the University of Pennsylvania	
Michael M. E. Johns	University of Michigan Medical School	1968	Chancellor of Emory University	
Albert R. Jonsen	Honorary	2009	President of the University of San Francisco; chairman of the Department of Medical History and Ethics at the University of Washington School of Medicine	
Shotai Kobayashi	Honorary	2014	President of Shimane University and dean of Shimane University Medical School	
J. Quigg Newton	Honorary	2000	President of the University of Colorado and mayor of Denver	
James Orbinski	Honorary	2003	Principal of Massey College, Toronto	
Valerie Montgomery Rice	Morehouse School of Medicine	2013	President and dean of Morehouse School of Medicine	
Ignacio Sánchez Díaz	Honorary	2014	Rector of the Pontifical Catholic University of Chile	
Frederick Seitz	Honorary	1980	President of Rockefeller University and president of the United States National Academy of Sciences	
Brian L. Strom	Rutgers New Jersey Medical School	2014	Chancellor of Rutgers Health	
Margaret Turner-Warwick	Honorary	1987	President of the Royal College of Physicians	
Ray L. Watts	Washington University School of Medicine	1980	President of the University of Alabama at Birmingham	
Torsten Wiesel	Honorary	1992	President of Rockefeller University, neuroscientist, and recipient of the Nobel Prize in Physiology or Medicine in 1981	

=== Vice presidents, vice chancellors, and provosts ===
Name	Chapter	Initiation year	Notability	Ref.
David A. Asch	Weill Cornell Medical College	1984	Senior vice president of the University of Pennsylvania and professor of medicine at the Perelman School of Medicine	
Richard Barohn	University of Missouri–Kansas City School of Medicine	2003	Executive vice chancellor for health affairs at the University of Missouri and dean of the University of Missouri School of Medicine	
Nancy E. Gary	Drexel University College of Medicine	1984	Executive vice president of the Uniformed Services University of the Health Sciences and dean of its F. Edward Hébert School of Medicine	
Harry R. Jacobson	University of Illinois College of Medicine	1970	Vice chancellor for health affairs and CEO of Vanderbilt University Medical Center	
Steven Libutti	Columbia University College of Physicians and Surgeons	1990	Vice chancellor for cancer programs for Rutgers Health and director of the Rutgers Cancer Institute of New Jersey	
Daniel H. Lowenstein	UCSF School of Medicine	1983	Executive vice chancellor and provost at the University of California, San Francisco	
Steven T. Rosen	Feinberg School of Medicine	1976	Provost and chief scientific officer of City of Hope National Medical Center	

=== Deans ===
Name	Chapter	Initiation year	Notability	Ref.
Azra Bihorac	University of Florida College of Medicine	2022	Professor and senior associate dean of research at the University of Florida College of Medicine	
Luther Christman	Honorary	1981	Dean of the nursing school at Vanderbilt University and Rush University	
Loretta Ford	Honorary	2000	Founding dean of the nursing school at the University of Rochester	
Martha N. Hill	Honorary	2009	Dean of the Johns Hopkins School of Nursing	
I. Michael Leitman	Boston University School of Medicine	1985	Professor and dean at the Icahn School of Medicine at Mount Sinai	
Leah Lowenstein	University of Wisconsin School of Medicine and Public Health	1954	Dean and professor of medicine and biochemistry at the Boston University School of Medicine	
Robert H. Miller	Tulane University School of Medicine	1973	Dean of the University of Nevada, Reno School of Medicine	
Etta D. Pisano	Duke University School of Medicine	2003	Professor of radiology at the Beth Israel Deaconess Medical Center and chief research dean at the American College of Radiology	
Hans Popper	Icahn School of Medicine at Mount Sinai	1970	Father of hepatology, pathologist-in-chief at the Mount Sinai Hospital, founder and first dean of the Mount Sinai School of Medicine	
Megan Ranney	Columbia University College of Physicians and Surgeons	2004	Dean of Yale School of Public Health	
Frederick Chapman Robbins	Case Western Reserve University School of Medicine	1967	Professor of pediatrics and dean of the Case Western Reserve University School of Medicine and recipient of the Nobel Prize in Physiology or Medicine 1954	
Paul B. Rothman	Yale School of Medicine	1984	Dean of the medical faculty and vice president for medicine at Johns Hopkins University	
Hermann von Wechlinger Schulte	Columbia University College of Physicians and Surgeons	1912	Anatomist, professor, and dean of Creighton University School of Medicine	
Rosemary A. Stevens	Honorary	1989	Dean of the School of Arts and Sciences at the University of Pennsylvania	
George H. Whipple	Johns Hopkins School of Medicine	1909	Founding dean University of Rochester Medical Center, and recipient of the Nobel Prize in Physiology or Medicine 1934	

=== Department chairs ===
Name	Chapter	Initiation year	Notability	Ref.
David H. Adams	Duke University School of Medicine	1981	Chairman of the Department of Cardiothoracic Surgery at Icahn School of Medicine at Mount Sinai Hospital	
Kamal Badr	American University of Beirut Faculty of Medicine	1979	Chair of the Department of Internal Medicine at the American University of Beirut	
William Bennett Bean	University of Virginia School of Medicine	1934	Professor and head of internal medicine at the University of Iowa College of Medicine	
Colin Blakemore	Honorary	1996	Neurobiologist, director of medical studies at Downing College, and lecturer in physiology at the University of Cambridge	
Michael L. Brodman	Icahn School of Medicine at Mount Sinai	2007	Chairman of the Department of Obstetrics, Gynecology and Reproductive Science at Mount Sinai Hospital, Mount Sinai Health System, and Icahn School of Medicine at Mount Sinai	
Carol Brown	Columbia University College of Physicians and Surgeons	1986	Chair for health equity at Memorial Sloan Kettering Cancer Center and a professor at Weill Cornell Medical College	
Frank A. Chervenak	Sidney Kimmel Medical College	1976	Chair of obstetrics and gynecology at Lenox Hill Hospital and the Zucker School of Medicine	
Gary Desir	Yale School of Medicine	1980	Chair of the department of internal medicine at Yale School of Medicine	
David Gius	Feinberg School of Medicine	2014	Director of the Women's Cancer Research Program and vice chair of translational research at the Feinberg School of Medicine	
Mark S. Gold	University of Florida College of Medicine	2007	Chair of the Department of Psychiatry at the University of Florida College of Medicine	
Sandi Lam	Feinberg School of Medicine	2002	Vice chair for pediatric neurological surgery at Northwestern University	
Paul Mischel	Weill Cornell Medical College	1991	Vice chair for research for the Department of Pathology at Stanford University School of Medicine	
Jacqueline Nwando Olayiwola	Ohio State University College of Medicine	2016	Chair and professor in the Department of Family Medicine at Ohio State University Wexner Medical Center	
Charles D. Phelps	Roy J. and Lucille A. Carver College of Medicine	1963	Chair of the Ophthalmology Department at the Roy J. and Lucille A. Carver College of Medicine	
Keith Peters	Honorary	2001	Head of the School of Clinical Medicine and Regius Professor of Physic at the University of Cambridge	
William S. Pierce	Perelman School of Medicine	1961	Chief of the Division of Artificial Organs and the Division of Cardiothoracic Surgery, director of surgical research, and associate chair of the Department of Surgery at Pennsylvania State University	
Steven M. Reppert	University of Nebraska Medical Center College of Medicine	1973	Chair of the Department of Neurobiology at the University of Massachusetts Medical School	
Martin Roth	Honorary	1998	Chair of psychological medicine at Newcastle University	
Alan L. Schiller	Rosalind Franklin University of Medicine and Science	1982	Chair of the Department of Pathology at Mount Sinai Medical	
David Sabiston	Johns Hopkins School of Medicine	1947	Chairman of the Department of Surgery at Duke University School of Medicine	
Yoel Sadovsky	Washington University School of Medicine	2004	Chair of Women's Health Research, at the University of Pittsburgh	
Robert William Schrier	Indiana University School of Medicine	1962	Chairman of the Department of Medicine at the University of Colorado School of Medicine and founding editor-in-chief of Nature Clinical Practice Nephrology	
Stuart C. Sealfon	University of South Florida College of Medicine	1989	Chairman of the Department of Neurology at Mount Sinai School of Medicine	
Eric Manvers Shooter	Honorary	2001	Founding chairman of the Department of Neurobiology at Stanford University School of Medicine	
John T. Sinnott	University of South Florida College of Medicine	1989	Chairman of internal medicine at the University of South Florida College of Medicine	
Charles Vacanti	University of Nebraska Medical Center College of Medicine	2003	Head of the Department of Anesthesiology at the University of Massachusetts and Brigham and Women’s Hospital; professor emeritus of anesthesiology at Harvard Medical School	
David Weatherall	Honorary	1988	Regius Professor of Medicine at the University of Oxford	
John N. Whitaker	University of Tennessee Health Science Center College of Medicine	1965	Chairman of the Neurology Department at the University of Alabama at Birmingham	
Owen White	Honorary	2016	Bioinformatician and director of the Institute for Genome Sciences at the University of Maryland School of Medicine	
Jose Wiley	Tulane University School of Medicine	2025	Chair of cardiovascular medicine and professor of medicine at Tulane University School of Medicine	
Dean Winslow	Sidney Kimmel Medical College	1976	Chair of the Department of Medicine at the Santa Clara Valley Medical Center and professor and vice chair of medicine at Stanford University	

=== Professors ===
Name	Chapter	Initiation year	Notability	Ref.
Peter Agre	Johns Hopkins School of Medicine	1997	Molecular biologist, professor at the Johns Hopkins Bloomberg School of Public Health and Johns Hopkins School of Medicine, and recipient of the recipient of the Nobel Prize in Chemistry in 2003	
Lihadh Al-Gazali	Honorary	2008	Professor in clinical genetics and pediatrics at the Department of Paediatrics of United Arab Emirates University	
Marcia Angell	Boston University School of Medicine	1997	Senior lecturer in the Department of Global Health and Social Medicine at Harvard Medical School	
Amin J. Barakat	American University of Beirut Faculty of Medicine	1984	Clinical professor of pediatrics and pediatric nephrology at Georgetown University	
Patrick D. Barnes	University of Oklahoma College of Medicine	1972	Emeritus professor of radiology at the Stanford School of Medicine	
Todd Baron	University of Alabama at Birmingham School of Medicine	1988	Gastroenterologist and professor of medicine at the University of North Carolina School of Medicine	
Denis Baylor	Yale School of Medicine	1964	Neurobiologist and professor of neurobiology at Stanford University	
Stanley Rossiter Benedict	Weill Cornell Medical College	1919	Professor of biochemistry at the Cornell University Medical School	
Paul Berg	Honorary	1992	Professor at Washington University School of Medicine and Stanford University School of Medicine; director of the Beckman Center for Molecular and Genetic Medicine; and recipient of the Nobel Prize in Chemistry in 1980	
Timothy J. Broderick	VCU School of Medicine	1997	Professor of surgery and biomedical engineering at the University of Cincinnati	
David F. M. Brown	Columbia University College of Physicians and Surgeons	1985	Professor of emergency medicine at Harvard Medical School and chief of the Department of Emergency Medicine at Massachusetts General Hospital	
Charles S. Bryan	University of South Carolina School of Medicine	1982	Professor emeritus of internal medicine at the University of South Carolina School of Medicine	
Linda M. Brzustowicz	Columbia University College of Physicians and Surgeons	1987	Professor of genetics at Rutgers University	
William Warrick Cardozo	Ohio State University College of Medicine	1933	Pediatrician and instructor at the Howard University College of Medicine	
Luigi Luca Cavalli-Sforza	Honorary	1996	Population geneticist who taught at the University of Parma, the University of Pavia, and Stanford University	
Placida Gardner Chesley	University of Michigan Medical School	1911	Professor of pathology, toxicology, physiology, histology, and chemistry at the University of Southern California	
Randolph Chitwood	Duke University School of Medicine	1984	Cardiothoracic surgeon at the Brody School of Medicine at East Carolina University	
Lawrence H. Cohn	University of Illinois College of Medicine	1970	Pioneering cardiac surgeon on the surgical staff at Harvard Medical School	
Deidra Crews	Johns Hopkins School of Medicine	2017	Nephrologist, epidemiologist, and professor of medicine at Johns Hopkins School of Medicine	
Kay Davies	Honorary	1998	Geneticist, Dr Lee's Professor of Anatomy at the University of Oxford, and a fellow of Hertford College, Oxford.	
G. Michael Deeb	University of Pittsburgh School of Medicine	1992	Professor of surgery and director of the Multidisciplinary Aortic Clinic at the University of Michigan	
Faith Thayer Fitzgerald	UCSF School of Medicine	1969	Professor at the UC Davis School of Medicine	
Joseph Fletcher	Honorary	1981	Professor of medical ethics at the University of Virginia who developed the theory of situational ethics	
Renée Fox	Honorary	2004	Academic and field researcher specializing in the sociology of medicine, medical research, medical education, and medical ethics	
Erica Frank	Mercer University School of Medicine	2005	Professor in UBC Faculty of Medicine	
Michael Fredericson	New York Medical College	1987	Professor of orthopedic surgery and the director of physical medicine and rehabilitation and sports medicine in the Department of Orthopaedic Surgery at Stanford University	(Note: Misspelled as Michael Fredricson in the Alpha Omega Alpha member database.)
W. Bruce Fye	Johns Hopkins School of Medicine	1972	Cardiologist and professor of medicine and the history of medicine at the Mayo Clinic	
Eric M. Genden	Icahn School of Medicine at Mount Sinai	1992	Professor of otolaryngology, neurosurgery, and immunology at the Icahn School of Medicine at Mount Sinai	
Daniel Geschwind	Yale School of Medicine	1991	Professor of human genetics, neurology, and psychiatry at the David Geffen School of Medicine at UCLA	
Sherita Hill Golden	University of Virginia School of Medicine	1994	Professor of endocrinology and metabolism at Johns Hopkins University	
Esther Greisheimer	University of Minnesota Medical School	1923	Surgeon and professor at the University of Minnesota, the Medical College of Pennsylvania, and the Temple University School of Medicine	
Blair Grubb	University of Toledo College of Medicine and Life Sciences	1998	Professor of medicine, pediatrics, and neurology at the University of Toledo	
Harold Percival Himsworth	Honorary	1979	Professor of medicine at the University of London	
Charles Brenton Huggins	Harvard Medical School	1951	Founding staff member of the University of Chicago Medical School and recipient of the Nobel Prize in Physiology or Medicine in 1966	
Henry Janowitz	Columbia University College of Physicians and Surgeons	1939	Professor emeritus of gastroenterology at the Icahn School of Medicine at Mount Sinai	
Yo-El Ju	Columbia University College of Physicians and Surgeons	2005	Professor of neurology at the Washington University School of Medicine	
Carl H. June	Baylor College of Medicine	1978	Professor in immunotherapy in the Department of Pathology and Laboratory Medicine at the Perelman School of Medicine	
William Kaelin Jr.	Duke University School of Medicine	1983	Professor of medicine at Harvard University and recipient of the Nobel Prize in Physiology or Medicine 2019	
Eric R. Kandel	New York University School of Medicine	1969	Professor of biochemistry and biophysics at the College of Physicians and Surgeons and recipient of the Nobel Prize in Physiology or Medicine 2000	
Ann Marie Kimball	University of Washington School of Medicine	1975	Professor in the Department of Epidemiology at the University of Washington	
James Kirklin	Harvard Medical School	1973	Cardiac surgeon and professor at the University of Alabama at Birmingham	
Peter C. Klatsky	Icahn School of Medicine at Mount Sinai	2003	Doctor specializing in reproductive endocrinology and infertility and an assistant professor at the Albert Einstein College of Medicine	
Luella Klein	Roy J. and Lucille A. Carver College of Medicine	1949	Obstetrician, gynecologist, and professor at Emory University School of Medicine	
Nathan Kuppermann	UCSF School of Medicine	1984	Professor in emergency medicine and pediatrics at the UC Davis School of Medicine	
Raphael Carl Lee	Lewis Katz School of Medicine at Temple University	1975	Biomedical engineer and professor at the University of Chicago	
Rudolph Leibel	Albert Einstein College of Medicine / Montefiore Medical Center	1967	Professor of at Columbia University Medical Center	
Jenna Lester	Alpert Medical School	2014	Dermatologist and faculty member at the University of California, San Francisco	
Constantine G. Lyketsos	Washington University School of Medicine	1988	Professor in the Department of Psychiatry and Behavioral Sciences at Johns Hopkins University	
Crystal Mackall	Northeast Ohio Medical University	1984	Professor of pediatrics and medicine at Stanford University	
Kimberly D. Manning	Case Western Reserve University School of Medicine	2000	Professor of medicine at Emory University School of Medicine	
Frank I. Marcus	Boston University School of Medicine	1952	Professor of medicine at the University of Arizona Health Sciences Center	
George M. Martin	University of Washington School of Medicine	1980	Biogerontologist and faculty member at the University of Washington	
Attilio Maseri	Honorary	2000	Cardiologist and professor at the Royal Postgraduate Medical School of the University of London, Università Cattolica del Sacro Cuore, and Vita-Salute San Raffaele University	
David B. Matchar	University of Maryland School of Medicine	1980	Professor of medicine and pathology at Duke University School of Medicine	
Lloyd Mayer	Icahn School of Medicine at Mount Sinai	1976	Professor and co-director of the Immunology Institute at the Mount Sinai Medical Center	
Mary Ann McLaughlin	Georgetown University School of Medicine	1989	Cardiologist and associate professor at Mount Sinai Medical Center	
Thomas C. Merigan	UCSF School of Medicine	1958	Virologist and the professor at the Stanford University School of Medicine	
Aaron E. Miller	NYU Grossman School of Medicine	1967	Professor of neurology at the Icahn School of Medicine at Mount Sinai	
George R. Minot	Harvard Medical School	1911	Professor of medicine at Harvard University and recipient of the Nobel Prize in Physiology or Medicine 1934	
Emma Sadler Moss	LSU Health Sciences Center New Orleans	1950	Pathologist and professor at the Louisiana State University School of Medicine	
Dariush Mozaffarian	Columbia University College of Physicians and Surgeons	1995	Cardiologist and professor at the Friedman School of Nutrition Science and Policy and Tufts University School of Medicine	
Gustav Nossal	Honorary	1986	Professor of medical biology at the University of Melbourne	
Marcella Nunez-Smith	Sidney Kimmel Medical College	2001	Professor of medicine and epidemiology at the Yale School of Medicine	
Paul Nyirjesy	Georgetown University School of Medicine	1985	Professor in the Department of Obstetrics and Gynecology at Drexel University	
Francis Weld Peabody	Harvard Medical School	1906	Professor at Harvard Medical School who researched polio and typhoid fever	
Eliana Perrin	University of Rochester School of Medicine and Dentistry	1997	Professor in the School of Medicine and the School of Nursing at Johns Hopkins University	
William A. Petri	University of Virginia School of Medicine	1992	Professor of epidemiology at the University of Virginia School of Medicine	
Tina Young Poussaint	Yale School of Medicine	1983	Professor of radiology at the Harvard Medical School and a neuroradiologist at the Boston Children's Hospital	
Robert Provenzano	Wayne State University School of Medicine	1995	Nephrologist and associate clinical professor of medicine at Wayne State University School of Medicine	
Tatiana Prowell	Johns Hopkins School of Medicine	1988	Associate professor of oncology at Johns Hopkins School of Medicine	(Note: Listed in the Alpha Omega Alpha member database as Tanya Prowell.)
Charles Raison	Washington University School of Medicine	1991	Professor of psychiatry at the University of Wisconsin School of Medicine and Public Health	
Rajiv Ratan	NYU Grossman School of Medicine	1988	Professor of neurology and neuroscience at Weill Cornell Medicine	
Dickinson W. Richards	Columbia University College of Physicians and Surgeons	1922	Professor of medicine at Columbia University and recipient of the Nobel Prize in Physiology or Medicine 1956	
Charles C. Richardson	Wayne State University School of Medicine	1995	Biochemist and professor at Harvard University	
John-Ross Rizzo	New York Medical College	2008	Professor of rehabilitation medicine at NYU Langone Health	
Daniel Roses	NYU Grossman School of Medicine	1984	Professor of surgery and oncology of the New York University Grossman School of Medicine	
David T. Rubin	Pritzker School of Medicine	1994	Professor of medicine and pathology at the University of Chicago	
John F. Sarwark	Feinberg School of Medicine	2000	Professor of pediatric orthopaedics at Lurie Children's Hospital and professor of orthopaedic surgery at the Feinberg School of Medicine	
Harry Schachter	University of Toronto Faculty of Medicine	1957	Professor at the University of Toronto and at The Hospital for Sick Children	
Joseph E. Scherger	David Geffen School of Medicine at UCLA	1975	Clinical professor of family medicine at the University of California, Riverside	
Robert A. Schwartz	New York Medical College	1974	Professor of dermatology, medicine, pediatrics, preventive medicine, and community health at the Rutgers New Jersey Medical School	
Gregg L. Semenza	Perelman School of Medicine	1981	Professor of genetic medicine at the Johns Hopkins School of Medicine and recipient of the Nobel Prize in Physiology or Medicine 2019	
Sheila Sherlock	Honorary	1992	United Kingdom's first female professor of medicine, working at the Royal Free Hospital School of Medicine	
George Siber	McGill University Faculty of Medicine	1969	Professor at Johns Hopkins University and University of Massachusetts Medical School	
Omega Silva	Howard University College of Medicine	1990	Professor at George Washington University and Howard University	
Kendall Smith			Professor emeritus of medicine at Weill Cornell Medicine	
Wendell Meredith Stanley	Perelman School of Medicine	1938	Professor of biochemistry at the University of California, Berkeley and recipient of the Nobel Prize in Chemistry in 1946	
Patrick J. Stiff	Stritch School of Medicine	1974	Faculty of the Stritch School of Medicine	
Cyrus W. Strickler			Professor of clinical medicine at Emory University	
Peter J. Taub	Albert Einstein College of Medicine / Montefiore Medical Center	1993	Professor of surgery at the Icahn School of Medicine at Mount Sinai	
Ann Tilton	University of Texas Medical Branch School of Medicine	1978	Professor of neurology and pediatrics at Louisiana State University Health Services Center	
Stanley M. Truhlsen	University of Nebraska Medical Center College of Medicine	1949	Ophthalmologist and professor at the University of Nebraska Medical Center	
Heather Wakelee	Johns Hopkins School of Medicine	1996	Professor of oncology at Stanford University Medical Center	
Steven D. Waldman	University of Missouri–Kansas City School of Medicine	1993	Professor of anesthesiology at Kansas City University	
Percy Wootton	VCU School of Medicine	1995	Professor of medicine at the Medical College of Virginia	
Clyde Yancy	Tulane University School of Medicine	1981	Cardiologist and professor at Feinberg School of Medicine	
John Zachary Young	Honorary	1978	Professor of anatomy at University College London	

== Astronauts ==
Name	Chapter	Initiation year	Notability	Ref.
James P. Bagian	Sidney Kimmel Medical College	1989	NASA astronaut and physician	
Michael Barratt	Feinberg School of Medicine	1987	NASA astronaut and aerospace medicine physician	
Sonny Carter	Emory University School of Medicine	1984	NASA astronaut and chemist	
Jerry M. Linenger	Wayne State University School of Medicine	1981	NASA astronaut	

== Biology ==
Name	Chapter	Initiation year	Notability	Ref.
Harvey J. Alter	University of Rochester School of Medicine and Dentistry	2021	Virologist and recipient of the Nobel Prize in Physiology or Medicine	
Sydney Brenner	Honorary	1993	Biologist, founder of the Molecular Sciences Institute, and recipient of the Nobel Prize in Physiology or Medicine 2002	
Maurice Brodie	McGill University Faculty of Medicine	1928	Virologist and polio researcher	
Macfarlane Burnet	Indiana University School of Medicine	1963	Virologist and recipient of the Nobel Prize in Physiology or Medicine 1960	
Lewis L. Coriell	University of Kansas School of Medicine	1941	Virologist	
Suzanne Cory	Honorary	1998	Molecular biologist with the Walter and Eliza Hall Institute of Medical Research	
Renato Dulbecco	Honorary	1993	Virologist and recipient of the Nobel Prize in Physiology or Medicine 1975	
Gerald Edelman	Perelman School of Medicine	1953	Biologist and recipient of the Nobel Prize in Physiology or Medicine 1972	
Joseph Erlanger	Johns Hopkins School of Medicine	1909	Physiologist and recipient of the Nobel Prize in Physiology or Medicine 1944	
Herbert Spencer Gasser	Johns Hopkins School of Medicine	1915	Physiologist and recipient of the Nobel Prize in Physiology or Medicine 1944	
Carol W. Greider	Johns Hopkins School of Medicine	2012	Molecular biologist and recipient of the Nobel Prize in Physiology or Medicine 2009	
Joshua Lederberg	University of California, Berkeley	1982	Molecular biologist and recipient of the Nobel Prize in Physiology or Medicine 1958	
Salvadore Luria	Honorary	1985	Microbiologist and recipient of the Nobel Prize in Physiology or Medicine 1969	
Daniel Nathans	Washington University School of Medicine	1953	Microbiologist and recipient of the Nobel Prize in Physiology or Medicine 1978	
George Emil Palade	Yale School of Medicine (honorary)	1933	Cell biologist, physicist, and recipient of the Nobel Prize in Physiology or Medicine 1974	
Hamilton O. Smith	Johns Hopkins School of Medicine	1979	Biologist and recipient of the Nobel Prize in Physiology or Medicine 1978	
Thomas Huckle Weller	Harvard Medical School	1940	Virologist and recipient of the Nobel Prize in Physiology or Medicine 1954	
Jonas Salk	NYU Grossman School of Medicine	1937	Virologist, developer of the polio vaccine, and founder of the Salk Institute for Biological Studies	
Ralph M. Steinman	Harvard Medical School	1968	Immunologist, biologist, medical researcher at Rockefeller University, and recipient of the Nobel Prize in Physiology or Medicine 2011	
James Watson	Honorary	1994	Molecular biologist, geneticist, and zoologist; director, president, and chancellor of the Cold Spring Harbor Laboratory; co-recipient of the Nobel Prize in Physiology or Medicine 1962	

== Business ==
Name	Chapter	Initiation year	Notability	Ref.
Robert I. Grossman	Perelman School of Medicine	1973	CEO of NYU Langone Health and dean of NYU Grossman School of Medicine	
Jeffrey Leiden	Pritzker School of Medicine	1981	Executive chairman of Vertex Pharmaceuticals	
Joseph Molina	USC Keck School of Medicine	1984	CEO of Molina Healthcare	
Ed Roberts	Mercer University School of Medicine	2009	Founder of Micro Instrumentation and Telemetry Systems and inventor of the first commercially successful personal computer	
Pedram Salimpour	Boston University School of Medicine	2014	Co-founder of CareNex Health Services (now part of Anthem)	
Alejandro Zaffaroni	Honorary	1995	Founder of biotechnology companies in Silicon Valley that helped develop the birth control pill, the nicotine patch, corticosteroids, and the DNA microarray	

== Chemistry ==
Name	Chapter	Initiation year	Notability	Ref.
Étienne-Émile Baulieu	Honorary	2006	Biochemist and endocrinologist who is best known for his research in the field of steroid hormones	
John Paul Blass	Columbia University College of Physicians and Surgeons	1964	Physician, biochemist, and neurochemist	
Thomas Cech	Columbia University College of Physicians and Surgeons (honorary)	2011	Biochemist and recipient of the Nobel Prize in Chemistry in 1989	
Stanley Cohen	Vanderbilt University School of Medicine	1987	Biochemist and recipient of the Nobel Prize in Physiology or Medicine 1986	
Carl Ferdinand Cori	Washington University School of Medicine	1950	Biochemist and recipient of the Nobel Prize in Physiology or Medicine 1947	
Edward Adelbert Doisy	Saint Louis University School of Medicine	1930	Biochemist and recipient of the Nobel Prize in Physiology or Medicine 1943	
Robert F. Furchgott	SUNY Downstate Health Sciences University	1967	Biochemist and recipient of the Nobel Prize in Physiology or Medicine 1998	
Joseph L. Goldstein	University of Texas Southwestern Medical School	1965	Biochemist and recipient of the Nobel Prize in Physiology or Medicine 1985	
Arthur Kornberg	University of Rochester School of Medicine and Dentistry	1940	Biochemist and recipient of the Nobel Prize in Physiology or Medicine 1959	
Edwin G. Krebs	Washington University School of Medicine	1943	Biochemist and recipient of the Nobel Prize in Physiology or Medicine 1992	
Fritz Albert Lipmann	Harvard Medical School	1955	Biochemist and recipient of the Nobel Prize in Physiology or Medicine 1953	
John Macleod	University of Toronto Faculty of Medicine	1916	Biochemist, physiologist, and recipient of the Nobel Prize in Physiology or Medicine 1923	
Severo Ochoa	New York University School of Medicine	1947	Biochemist and recipient of the Nobel Prize in Physiology or Medicine 1959	

== Entertainment ==
Name	Chapter	Initiation year	Notability	Ref.
Randal Haworth	USC Keck School of Medicine	1988	Plastic surgeon known for his leading role in the reality TV series The Swan	
Michael O'Donnell	Honorary	1995	BBC Radio writer and presenter for My Word! and Relative Values, and presenter of O'Donnell Investigates on BBC Television	
Adeiyewunmi Osinubi	Alpert Medical School	2022	Documentary filmmaker	
Paul Sidhu	Tulane University School of Medicine	1999	Actor and producer	
Travis Stork	University of Virginia School of Medicine	2003	Television personality best known for appearing on The Bachelor, and as the host of The Doctors	

== Governmental agencies ==
=== Military ===
Name	Chapter	Initiation year	Notability	Ref.
Warren L. Carpenter	University of Arkansas for Medical Sciences, College of Medicine	1995	Chief medical officer with the Department of Defense	
Bruce L. Gillingham	Uniformed Services University of the Health Sciences F. Edward Hébert School of Medicine	1986	Surgeon General of the United States Navy	
Robert J. T. Joy	Uniformed Services University of the Health Sciences F. Edward Hébert School of Medicine	1984	Physician, career Army Medical Corps officer, and commander of the Walter Reed Army Institute of Research	
John Hemsley Pearn	Honorary	2014	Surgeon General of the Australian Defence Force	
Walton T. Roth	NYU Grossman School of Medicine	1964	Chief of the Psychiatric Consultation Service at the United States Department of Veterans Affairs	
K. Vardachari Thiruvengadam	Honorary	2008	Medical teacher at Madras Medical Service	
Sharon Weiss	Johns Hopkins School of Medicine	1971	Soft tissue pathologist at the Armed Forces Institute of Pathology	

=== National Institutes of Health ===
Name	Chapter	Initiation year	Notability	Ref.
John E. Bennett	Johns Hopkins School of Medicine	1959	Senior investigator in the clinical mycology section at the National Institute of Allergy and Infectious Diseases	
Marie Bernard	Perelman School of Medicine	2023	Chief officer for scientific workforce diversity at the National Institutes of Health and the deputy director of the National Institute on Aging	
Thelma Brumfield Dunn	University of Virginia School of Medicine	1925	Staff pathologist and head of the Cancer Induction and Pathogenesis Section of the National Cancer Institute	
Christopher Hourigan	Johns Hopkins School of Medicine	2009	Chief of the Laboratory of Myeloid Malignancies at the National Heart, Lung, and Blood Institute and founding co-director of the Myeloid Malignancies Program at the National Institutes of Health	
Ben Lawton	University of Wisconsin School of Medicine and Public Health	1946	General and thoracic surgeon with the National Institute of Medicine	
Lisa C. Richardson	UNC School of Medicine	1988	Director of Centers for Disease Control and Prevention Division of Cancer Prevention and Control	
Maxine Singer	Honorary	1989	Chief of the laboratory of biochemistry at the National Cancer Institute	
Peter Tishler	Yale School of Medicine	1962	Public health service officer at the National Institutes of Health	
Harold E. Varmus	Columbia University College of Physicians and Surgeons	1964	Director of the National Institutes of Health and the National Cancer Institute and recipient of the Nobel Prize in Physiology or Medicine 1989	
John B. West	Honorary	2006	Respiratory physiologist with the National Institute of Health's Cardiovascular and Pulmonary Study Section and the Ames Research Center; member of the 1960–61 Silver Hut expedition	

=== Public health service ===
Name	Chapter	Initiation year	Notability	Ref.
Deirdre Hine	Honorary	2002	Chief Medical Officer for Wales, Deputy Chief Medical Officer for Wales, and chair of the Commission for Health Improvement	
Eric Keroack	Tufts University School of Medicine	1986	Obstetrician and gynecologist with the United States Department of Health and Human Services	
Matthew Walker Sr.	Meharry Medical College School of Medicine	1957	Surgeon in the reserve of the United States Public Health Service	

=== Surgeons General ===
Name	Chapter	Initiation year	Notability	Ref.
Leroy Edgar Burney	Indiana University School of Medicine	1960	Surgeon General of the United States	
Richard Carmona	UCSF School of Medicine	1980	Surgeon General of the United States	
C. Everett Koop	Weill Cornell Medical College	1989	Surgeon General of the United States	
Antonia C. Novello	University of Puerto Rico School of Medicine	1987	Surgeon General of the United States	
Vivek Murthy	Yale School of Medicine	2003	Surgeon General of the United States and vice admiral in the United States Public Health Service Commissioned Corps	
Thomas Parran	Columbia University College of Physicians and Surgeons	1940	Surgeon General of the United States	
Stephen C. Redd	Emory University School of Medicine	1983	Assistant Surgeon General of the United States and rear admiral with the U.S. Public Health Service	
Julius B. Richmond	University of Illinois College of Medicine	1938	Surgeon General of the United States	
Scott Rivkees	Rutgers New Jersey Medical School	1982	Surgeon General of Florida and Secretary of Health of Florida	
David Satcher	Case Western Reserve University School of Medicine	1969	Surgeon General of the United States	
Leonard A. Scheele	Wayne State University School of Medicine	1947	Surgeon General of the United States	
Jesse Leonard Steinfeld	VCU School of Medicine	1979	Surgeon General of the United States	
William H. Stewart	LSU Health Sciences Center New Orleans	1972	Surgeon General of the United States	

== Literature and journalism ==
Name	Chapter	Initiation year	Notability	Ref.
Louis Aronne	Weill Cornell Medical College	1990	Physician and author of popular diet books	
Rana Awdish	Wayne State University School of Medicine	2002	Physician and author of In Shock: My Journey from Death to Recovery and the Redemptive Power of Hope	
T. Berry Brazelton	Columbia University College of Physicians and Surgeons	1943	Pediatrician and author	
Victor Fuchs	Honorary	2006	Health economist known for his 1975 book Who Shall Live?	
Jeffrey Gusky	University of Washington School of Medicine	1982	Photographer whose work appeared in National Geographic	
John K. Iglehart	Honorary	2014	Founding editor of Health Affairs; national correspondent of The New England Journal of Medicine	
Paul Kalanithi	Yale School of Medicine	2007	Bestselling non-fiction author	
Daniel E. Koshland Jr.	Honorary	1988	Editor of Science	
Robert B. Rutherford	Johns Hopkins School of Medicine	1956	Author of the definitive textbook in vascular surgery and a senior editor of the Journal of Vascular Surgery	
Seymour I. Schwartz	NYU Grossman School of Medicine	1950	Editor-in-chief of Schwartz's Principles of Surgery and the Journal of the American College of Surgeons; chairman of the Department of Surgery at the University of Rochester in Rochester	
Bernie S. Siegel	Weill Cornell Medical College	1956	Author of Love, Medicine and Miracles	

== Medicine ==
Name	Chapter	Initiation year	Notability	Ref.
Rodolfo Armas Merino	Honorary	2008	Physician awarded the National Prize for Medicine in 2010	
Jean R. Anderson	Johns Hopkins School of Medicine	2005	Founder and director of the HIV Women's Health Program at Johns Hopkins School of Medicine	
Howard Apfel	SUNY Downstate Health Sciences University	1988	Rabbi and cardiologist practicing medicine at Columbia University Medical Center	
Erika F. Augustine	University of Rochester School of Medicine and Dentistry	2003	Director of the clinical trials unit at the Kennedy Krieger Institute	
Babak Azizzadeh	David Geffen School of Medicine at UCLA	1996	Facial plastic and reconstructive surgeon	
Richard Bayliss	Honorary	1998	Physician to the Queen and head of the Medical Household	
Baruj Benacerraf	VCU School of Medicine	1944	Immunologist and recipient of the Nobel Prize in Physiology or Medicine 1980	
Philip Bernatz	Roy J. and Lucille A. Carver College of Medicine	1944	Physician and thoracic surgeon at the Mayo Clinic	
Bruce Beutler	University of Texas Southwestern Medical School	2012	Director of the Center for the Genetics of Host Defense at the University of Texas Southwestern Medical Center and recipient of the Nobel Prize in Physiology or Medicine 2011	
Alfred Blalock	Johns Hopkins School of Medicine	1935	Cardiac surgeon and chief of surgery at Vanderbilt University and Johns Hopkins University	
Ernst Philip Boas	Columbia University College of Physicians and Surgeons	1913	Hospital director and physician who was a pioneer in the fields of pathology and physiology	
Patricia Flint Borns	Drexel University College of Medicine	1947	Pediatric radiologist	
David M. Bosworth	Robert Larner College of Medicine	1955	Orthopedic surgeon	
Michael Stuart Brown	Perelman School of Medicine	1965	Geneticist and recipient of the Nobel Prize in Physiology or Medicine 1985	
Francis V. Chisari	Weill Cornell Medical College	1966	Experimental pathologist and viral immunologist at the Scripps Clinic and Research Foundation	
Michel Chrétien	Honorary	2004	Neuroendocrinology researcher at the Institut de recherches cliniques de Montréal	
Lawrence H. Cohn	Stanford University School of Medicine	1962	Cardiac surgeon and researcher	
Florence Comite	Yale School of Medicine	1976	Endocrinologist and founder of the Center for Women's Health & Midwifery at the Yale School of Medicine	
John Vivian Dacie	Honorary	2000	Haematologist at King's College Hospital and the Royal Postgraduate Medical School	
Alan DeCherney	Lewis Katz School of Medicine at Temple University	1966	Obstetrician, gynecologist, and director of the reproductive endocrinology division at the University of California, Los Angeles	
Eugene Dibble	Howard University College of Medicine	1956	Physician and head of the John A. Andrew Memorial Hospital at Tuskegee Institute	
Stephen Dolgin	NYU Grossman School of Medicine	1977	Pediatric surgeon	
Richard Doll	Honorary	1985	Epidemiologist and medical researcher at Central Middlesex Hospital credited as the first to prove that smoking increased the risk of lung cancer and heart disease	
Lester Dragstedt	Pritzker School of Medicine	1920	Surgeon who was the first to separate conjoined twins successfully	
Charles Drew	McGill University Faculty of Medicine	1931	Surgeon and medical researcher	
Ogobara Doumbo	Honorary	2008	Medical researcher at the University of Mali, global leader in malaria research	
Janet Gilsdorf	University of Michigan Medical School	1999	Director of the Division of Pediatric Infectious Diseases in the University of Michigan Health System	
Dan M. Granoff	Washington University School of Medicine	1987	Chair and director of the Center of Immunobiology and Vaccine Development at Children's Hospital Oakland Research Institute	
James Hardy	Perelman School of Medicine	1941	Surgeon who performed the world's first lung transplant	
Leston Havens	Weill Cornell Medical College	1952	Psychiatrist and director of the psychiatry residency program at Cambridge Hospital	
Philip Showalter Hench	University of Pittsburgh School of Medicine	1925	Head of the Department of Rheumatology at Mayo Clinic and recipient of the Nobel Prize in Physiology or Medicine 1950	
Shigeaki Hinohara	Honorary	2003	Physician with St. Luke's International Hospital	
Steven Hoefflin	David Geffen School of Medicine at UCLA	1972	Plastic surgeon	
Elizabeth A. Hunt	Albany Medical College	1995	Pediatric intensivist, critical-care specialist, and director of the Johns Hopkins Medicine Simulation Center	
Henry van Zile Hyde	Johns Hopkins School of Medicine	1933	Physician with the World Health Organization	
Barry Jackson	Honorary	2004	Gastrointestinal surgeon at St Thomas' Hospital, Serjeant Surgeon to the Queen, and president of the Royal College of Surgeons	
Renee Jenkins	Howard University College of Medicine	1991	Pediatrician	
Olga Jonasson	University of Illinois College of Medicine	1957	Transplant surgeon	
David A. Karnofsky	Stanford University School of Medicine	1940	Clinical oncologist with Sloan-Kettering Institute for Cancer Research	
Herbert E. Kaufman	Harvard Medical School	1955	Ophthalmologist	
Daniel Kopans	Harvard Medical School	1974	Radiologist and founder of the breast imaging division at Massachusetts General Hospital	
Babak Larian	UC Irvine School of Medicine	1996	Director of the Head and Neck Cancer Center at Cedars-Sinai Medical Center	
C. Walton Lillehei	Harvard Medical School	1976	Pioneer of open-heart surgery	
Robert Ritchie Linton	Harvard Medical School	1924	Vascular surgeon	
Michael D. Lockshin	Weill Cornell Medical College	1979	Director of the Barbara Volcker Center for Women and Rheumatic Disease at Hospital for Special Surgery	
Ruth Lubic	Honorary	2001	Nurse-midwife	
Julie McElrath	Medical University of South Carolina College of Medicine	2002	Senior vice president and director of the vaccine and infectious disease division at Fred Hutchinson Cancer Research Center and the principal investigator of the HIV Vaccine Trials Network Laboratory Center	(Note: Listed in the Alpha Omega Alpha member directory as Margaret McElrath.)
Jock McKeen	Schulich School of Medicine and Dentistry	1970	Physician, acupuncturist, and co-founder of the Haven Institute	
A. L. Mestel	SUNY Downstate Health Sciences University	1952	Pioneer in the field of pediatric surgery	
Donald Metcalf	Honorary	1998	Medical researcher at the Walter and Eliza Hall Institute of Medical Research	
J. Glenn Morris	Tulane University School of Medicine	1976	Epidemiologist and founding director of the Emerging Pathogens Institute	
Joseph E. Murray	Honorary	1991	Plastic surgeon who is known as the "father of transplantation"; co-recipient of the Nobel Prize in Physiology or Medicine in 1990	
Kathleen Neuzil	Johns Hopkins School of Medicine	1987	Director of the Center for Vaccine Development at the University of Maryland School of Medicine	
Paul Nurse	Honorary	2000	Geneticist and co-recipient of the Nobel Prize in Physiology or Medicine in 2001	
William K. Oh	NYU Grossman School of Medicine	1992	Director of precision medicine for the Yale Cancer Center and Smilow Cancer Hospital	
Lloyd J. Old	UCSF School of Medicine	1958	Founder of cancer immunology, chair of cancer immunology at Memorial Sloan Kettering Cancer Center, and director of the Ludwig Cancer Research	
Marshall M. Parks	Marshall M. Parks	1942	"Father of pediatric ophthalmology" and chairman of the Department of Ophthalmology at the Washington Hospital Center and the Children’s National Medical Center	
Wendy Ross	Icahn School of Medicine at Mount Sinai	1997	Director of the Center for Autism and Neurodiversity at Jefferson Health and Thomas Jefferson University	(Note: Listed in the Alpha Omega Alpha member database as Wendy Sagett.)
Cicely Saunders	Honorary	2000	Nurse, social worker, and physician noted for her role in the birth of the hospice movement	
Megumi Yamaguchi Shinoda	Columbia University College of Physicians and Surgeons	1932	Physician, one of the first women of Japanese ancestry to receive a Doctor of Medicine degree in the US	
Eric. J. Small	Case Western Reserve University School of Medicine	1985	Deputy director and chief scientific officer of the Helen Diller Family Comprehensive Cancer Center	
George Stouffer	University of Maryland School of Medicine	1987	Chief of the Division of Cardiology at the UNC Medical Center	
Michael Stuart	Rush Medical College	1982	Sports physician and orthopedic surgeon at the Mayo Clinic	
Frederick Douglass Stubbs	Harvard Medical School	1931	Thoracic surgeon and one of the first Harvard-trained Black doctors	
Roberto Tapia-Conyer	Honorary	2005	Epidemiologist, general director of the Carlos Slim Health Institute and the Carlos Slim Foundation, and professor at the School of Medicine, UNAM	
Levi Watkins	Vanderbilt University School of Medicine	1982	First to successfully implant an automatic defibrillator in a human patient	
Paul Alan Wetter	Miller School of Medicine	1993	Minimally invasive and robotic surgery pioneer; founder and chairman emeritus of the Society of Laparoscopic and Robotic Surgeons	
Anthony Zacchei	Sidney Kimmel Medical College	199-	Ophthalmologist	

== Neurology and neuroscience ==
Name	Chapter	Initiation year	Notability	Ref.
Alexa Canady	University of Michigan Medical School	1974	Medical doctor specializing in pediatric neurosurgery	
Miguel A. Faria Jr.	Medical University of South Carolina College of Medicine	1975	Neurosurgeon, neuroscientist, and associate editor of Surgical Neurology International	
Paul Greengard	Honorary	2002	Neuroscientist and recipient of the Nobel Prize in Physiology or Medicine 2000	
Roger Guillemin	Baylor College of Medicine	1967	Neuroscientist and recipient of the Nobel Prize in Physiology or Medicine 1977	
M. Deborrah Hyde	Case Western Reserve University School of Medicine	1976	Neurosurgeon with the Guthrie Robert Packer Hospital	
Rita Levi-Montalcini	Washington University School of Medicine	1970	Neurologist and recipient of the Nobel Prize in Physiology or Medicine 1986	
Stanley B. Prusiner	Perelman School of Medicine	1968	Neurologist, chemist, and recipient of the Nobel Prize in Physiology or Medicine 1997	
John McLellan Tew	Wake Forest School of Medicine	1960	Neurosurgeon	

== Non-profits ==
Name	Chapter	Initiation year	Notability	Ref.
Christopher Booth	Honorary	2001	Clinician, medical historian, and founder of Coeliac UK	
Senait Fisseha	Southern Illinois University School of Medicine	1999	Vice-president of international programs at the Susan Thompson Buffet Foundation	
Peter G. Delaney	University of Michigan Medical School	2023	Executive director of LFR International and emergency medical researcher	
Steven M. Greer	James H. Quillen College of Medicine	1987	Ufologist and founder of the Center for the Study of Extraterrestrial Intelligence (CSETI)	
John Hilton Knowles	Washington University School of Medicine	1951	President of the Rockefeller Foundation and general director of the Massachusetts General Hospital	
Perry Nisen	Albert Einstein College of Medicine / Montefiore Medical Center	1982	CEO of the Sanford Burnham Prebys	
Patricia L. Turner	Wake Forest School of Medicine	2024	CEO and executive director of the American College of Surgeons	
Jan Vilček	NYU Grossman School of Medicine	2019	Chairman and CEO and chairman of the Vilcek Foundation and professor of microbiology at the New York University School of Medicine	
Mohamed Zaazoue	Indiana University School of Medicine	2022	Founder and president of Healthy Egyptians	

== Pharmacology ==
Name	Chapter	Initiation year	Notability	Ref.
Frederick Banting	University of Toronto Faculty of Medicine	1923	Pharmacologist and field surgeon who won the Nobel Prize in Physiology or Medicine 1923	
Alfred G. Gilman	Case Western Reserve University School of Medicine	1968	Pharmacologist and recipient of the Nobel Prize in Physiology or Medicine 1994	
Louis Ignarro	David Geffen School of Medicine at UCLA	1990	Pharmacologist and recipient of the Nobel Prize in Physiology or Medicine 1989	
Ferid Murad	Case Western Reserve University School of Medicine	1963	Pharmacologist and recipient of the Nobel Prize in Physiology or Medicine 1989	
Earl Wilbur Sutherland Jr.	Washington University School of Medicine	1940	Pharmacologist, biochemist, and recipient of the Nobel Prize in Physiology or Medicine 1971	
John Vane	Honorary	1989	Pharmacologist and recipient of the Nobel Prize in Physiology or Medicine 1982	

== Politics ==
Name	Chapter	Initiation year	Notability	Ref.
Otis R. Bowen	Indiana University School of Medicine	1941	Governor of Indiana and Secretary of Health and Human Services	
Robert Califf	Duke University School of Medicine	1976	Commissioner of Food and Drugs	
Ben Carson	Johns Hopkins School of Medicine	1991	United States Secretary of Housing and Urban Development and neurosurgeon	
James B. Edwards	Honorary	2003	United States Secretary of Energy, Governor of South Carolina, and South Carolina Senate	
Brett Giroir	University of Texas Southwestern Medical School	1986	Assistant Secretary for Health and Commissioner of Food and Drugs	
Beth Liston	Ohio State University College of Medicine	2002	Ohio Senate and Ohio House of Representatives	
Greg Murphy	UNC School of Medicine	1988	U.S. House of Representatives and North Carolina House of Representatives	
Frank Press	Honorary	1984	Director of the Office of Science and Technology Policy	
Jane Pringle	Case Western Reserve University School of Medicine	1971	Maine House of Representatives	
Eve Slater	Columbia University College of Physicians and Surgeons	1970	United States Assistant Secretary for Health and Human Services	
Louis W. Sullivan	Boston University School of Medicine	1957	United States Secretary of Health and Human Services and founding dean of the Morehouse School of Medicine	
Leslie Turnberg, Baron Turnberg	Honorary	2002	House of Lords	
Dave Weldon	Jacobs School of Medicine and Biomedical Sciences	1981	U.S. House of Representatives	

== Sports ==
Name	Chapter	Initiated date	Notability	Ref.
J. P. Darche	University of Kansas School of Medicine	2013	Professional football player with the Toronto Argonauts, the Seattle Seahawks, and the Kansas City Chiefs	
Loren Galler-Rabinowitz	Columbia University College of Physicians and Surgeons	2015	2004 U.S. ice dancing bronze medalist	
Gail Hopkins	Rush Medical College	1981	Major League Baseball player and coach	
Everett E. Kelley	Vanderbilt University School of Medicine	1924	All-American football player	
Ogonna Nnamani	UCSF School of Medicine	2020	2008 Summer Olympics medalist for indoor volleyball; member of the NCAA Women's Volleyball Championship winning team at Stanford University	
Patrick Staropoli	Miller School of Medicine	2017	NASCAR Xfinity Series and NASCAR Craftsman Truck Series professional racing driver	

== Other ==
Name	Chapter	Initiation year	Notability	Ref.
Clarence Hungerford Webb	Tulane University School of Medicine	1925	Amateur archaeologist and chairman of the Louisiana Archaeological Survey and Antiquities Commission	

== See also ==
- List of Alpha Omega Alpha chapters
