= Eric. J. Small =

American oncologist

Eric J. Small
- Medical career
- Profession: Medical Oncologist
- Field: Oncology
- Institutions: Helen Diller Family Comprehensive Cancer Center
- Sub-specialties: GU onclogy
- Research: Prostate cancer

Eric. J. Small is an American medical oncologist specializing in urologic oncology, with a focus on prostate cancer. He currently serves as the co-leader of the UCSF Prostate Cancer Program and the Deputy Director and Chief Scientific Officer at the Helen Diller Family Comprehensive Cancer Center. Additionally, he is the President-Elect of the American Society of Clinical Oncology (ASCO).

== Early life and education ==
Small grew up in Mexico City and attended a bilingual high school. He received his Bachelor's degree in Biology from Stanford University (1976–1980) and his medical degree from Case Western Reserve University School of Medicine (1980–1985). He completed an Internal Medicine residency at Beth Israel Deaconess Medical Center (1985–1988) and a Hematology/Oncology fellowship at the University of California, San Francisco (UCSF).

== Career ==
Small is the Co-Leader of the UCSF Prostate Cancer Program and the Deputy Director and Chief Scientific Officer at the Helen Diller Family Comprehensive Cancer Center. He was elected President of ASCO on December 13, 2024. He will take on the role of President-Elect after the ASCO Annual Business Meeting in Chicago on June 3, 2025.

Small formerly served as the chief of the UCSF Division of Hematology and Oncology. He actively participates on the ASCO Board of Directors and chairs four External Advisory Boards for other NCI-Designated Cancer Centers.

Dr. Small has consistently dedicated his career to promoting gender and ethnic equity in medicine. During his role as chief of the UCSF Division of Hematology and Oncology, he prioritized gender equity by expanding the faculty and ensuring gender parity in leadership positions. He also co-developed the MERIT (Minority Enrollment and Recruitment into Trials) initiative, which aims to increase inclusivity in clinical research for underrepresented groups.

Small has publication record of over 430 peer-reviewed articles on cancer research and prostate cancer. His research mainly concentrates on the mechanisms behind resistance to systemic therapy in advanced prostate cancer.. Notably, his work contributed to the development and FDA approval of Abiraterone and Apalutamide, both androgen signaling inhibitors (ASIs)

== Honors and awards ==
- Biomedical Research Grant, The Jackson Laboratory, Bar Harbour, ME (1978)
- NIH Research Support Grant, Case Western Reserve University, Cleveland, OH (1980)
- Alpha Omega Alpha Honor Medical Society (1984)
- Prostate Cancer Foundation Therapy Consortium (1997)
- Stanford W. and Norman R. Ascherman Endowed Chair (2006 – present)
- Richard L. Schilsky CALGB Award for Clinical Research (2011)
- UCSF Academic Senate Faculty Research Lecture in Clinical Science (2011)
- Fellow of the American Society of Clinical Oncology (FASCO; 2015)
- Inductee, OncLive Giants of Cancer Care, Genitourinary Cancer (2022)
