= Yoel Sadovsky =

US physician-scientist

- Citizenship: US
- Education: Hadassah Medical Center (MD, 1986); Washington University in St. Louis Barnes-Jewish Hospital (1986–1990); University of California, San Francisco (1990–1992); Cardiovascular Research Institute, University of California, San Francisco (1992–1993)
- Known for: Research in early human development and placental biology
- Awards: Cozzarelli Prize in Biomedical Science, National Academy of Sciences, 2013
- Scientific career
- Fields: Perinatal medicine and research in early human development and placental biology
- Institutions: Washington University School of Medicine; Magee-Womens Research Institute of the University of Pittsburgh

Yoel Sadovsky is a physician known for his studies of the molecular processes underlying placental development and function, and response to injuries that impact early human development. He is the scientific director of the Magee Womens Research Institute, and holds the Elsie Hilliard Hillman Chair of Women's Health Research, at the University of Pittsburgh.

== Education ==
Sadovsky received his MD from the Hadassah Medical School in 1986, and completed his Residency in Obstetrics and Gynecology at Washington University School of Medicine from 1986 to 1990. He subsequently moved to the University of California, San Francisco's School of Medicine, where he completed a Fellowship in Maternal-Fetal Medicine and post-doctoral research training.

== Career ==
From 1993 to 2007, Sadovsky was a faculty member at Washington University, and later a professor of Obstetrics and Gynecology, and Cell Biology and Physiology. He served as the Director of the Division of Maternal-Fetal Medicine and Ultrasound. In 2007 he was recruited to Pittsburgh, where he serves as the Executive and Scientific Director of the Magee Womens Research Institute at the University of Pittsburgh. He is also the Elsie Hilliard Hillman Chair of Women's Health Research, Distinguished Professor of OBGYN, with a joint appointment as Professor of Microbiology and Molecular Genetics, Vice Chair of the Dept. of OBGYN, and the Associate Dean of Women's Health Research and Reproductive Sciences.

Sadovsky, in 2012, became the director of the NIH-K12 "Building Interdisciplinary Research Careers in Women's Health (BIRCWH) Program", a grant-funded research faculty training program at the University of Pittsburgh. Sadovsky is an advocate for science and training in reproductive biology and women's health research.

== Research ==
Sadovsky's NIH-funded research integrates molecular and cellular biology, along with informatics tools, to decipher the differentiation of placental trophoblasts and their adaption to cellular injury. A primary focus is the function of the trophoblast's Non-coding RNAs, where diverse technologies are used to define the function and regulation of trophoblastic microRNA in response to injuries. MicroRNAs are also packaged in Extracellular vesicles (EVs), and his lab interrogates the mechanisms of release, uptake, and function of placental EVs at the maternal-fetal interface. Another focus in the lab has been fat trafficking in the placenta, including the dynamics of lipid droplets and trophoblastic mobilization of fatty acids, as well as the function of oxidized phospholipids and trophoblast ferroptotic injury. Sadovsky's research has contributed to over 225 published articles.

== Awards ==
- The President's Achievement Award of the Society for Reproductive Investigation (2004)
- Elected Member, Alpha Omega Alpha (2004)
- Editor of Placenta, (2012–2020)
- Elected member, National Academy of Medicine (2013)
- Awardee, Cozzarelli Prize in Biomedical Science, National Academy of Sciences (2013)
- Elected member, Association of American Physicians (2015)
- President, Society for Reproductive Investigation (2016–2017)
- Fellow ad eundem, Royal College of Obstetricians and Gynaecologists (2017)
