= Michael Fredericson =

American academic and physician

- Born: 1959 (age 66–67)
- Citizenship: American
- Occupations: Academic; Physician

Academic background
- Education: University of Redlands; New York Medical College

Michael Fredericson (born 1959) is an American academic and physician. He currently serves as a professor of orthopedic surgery and the director of Physical Medicine and Rehabilitation (PM&R) Sports Medicine within the Department of Orthopaedic Surgery at Stanford University. He is also the co-director of the Stanford Longevity Center.

== Early life and education ==
Born in 1959, Fredericson grew up in Cleveland, Ohio. His grandparents immigrated to the U.S. from Russia and Poland.

Fredericson graduated from Cleveland Heights High School in 1977 and then earned his Bachelor of Arts in psychology at the University of Redlands in California, in 1982, and later, his MD from New York Medical College in Valhalla, New York, in 1988. He then completed an internship at Mount Zion Medical Center in California in 1989.

In 1992, Fredericson completed his residency in physical medicine and rehabilitation at Stanford University. A year later, he received board certification in physical medicine and rehab from the American Board of Physical Medicine and Rehabilitation. The same year, he completed a fellowship in sports and spine medicine at SOAR in Menlo Park, California.

In 1996, Fredericson was awarded diplomate status from the American Association of Electrodiagnostic Medicine in Electrodiagnostic Medicine. He obtained a sub-specialty certification in sports medicine from the American Board of PM&R in 2007, along with a board certification in sports medicine from the American Board of Physical Medicine and Rehabilitation.

In 2020, he was board certified in lifestyle medicine by the American Board of Lifestyle Medicine.

== Career ==
Fredericson is the first physician to be promoted to Professor of Physical Medicine & Rehabilitation (PM&R) at Stanford University. He currently serves as the Director of PM&R Sports Medicine within Stanford's Department of Orthopaedic Surgery, co-director of the Stanford Longevity Center, and founder of the Stanford University's lifestyle medicine program. He is also the head team physician for Stanford University's track & field and swimming teams and medical director for Stanford Club Sports.

At Stanford, Fredericson initiated the first ACGME Sports Medicine Fellowship and continues as its Fellowship Director. He established several programs at Stanford, including PM&R services at the Stanford Cardinal Free Clinics, courses in lifestyle medicine and sports medicine, the Stanford RunSafe Injury Prevention Program, and a global research fellowship in sports medicine.

During his career, Fredericson has worked with USA Track & Field and the International Olympic Committee, contributing to both national and international sports medicine initiatives. In 2006, he was appointed as the head physician for the USA Track & Field Team at the IAAF World Indoor Championships in Athletics.

In 2009, Fredericson served as a visiting professor at Harvard University's Department of Physical Medicine & Rehabilitation (PM&R).

In 2021, Fredericson served as a physician for athletes at the Tokyo Olympics, working under the auspices of the International Olympic Committee.

His editorial roles have included serving as the senior founding editor of PM&R, associate editor of the Clinical Journal of Sport Medicine, and editorial board member of The Physician and Sportsmedicine.

== Bibliography ==
- Fredericson M. Foam Roller Techniques for Massage, Stretches and Improved Flexibility; 2011
- Fredericson M. Bone Stress Injuries: Diagnosis, Treatment, and Prevention; 2021
- Onishi K, Fredericson M, Dragoo J. Tendinopathy: From Basic Science To Clinical Management. Basingstoke, United Kingdom: Springer Nature Publishers; 2021.
- Frontera W, Silver J, Gutierrez M, Fredericson M (associate editor). Essentials of Physical Medicine and Rehabilitation, 5th Edition. Cambridge, MA: Elsevier Press; 2024.

== Selected publications ==
To date, Fredericson has published a total of 215 peer-reviewed publications, 4 books, and 40 book chapters.

- Fredericson, Michael; Bergman, A. Gabrielle; Hoffman, Kenneth L.; Dillingham, Michael S. (July 1995). "Tibial Stress Reaction in Runners: Correlation of Clinical Symptoms and Scintigraphy with a New Magnetic Resonance Imaging Grading System". The American Journal of Sports Medicine. 23 (4): 472–481. doi:10.1177/036354659502300418. PMID 7573660. S2CID 25469140.
- Fredericson, M.; Moore, T. (2005). "Core stabilisation training for middle- and long-distance runners" (PDF). Entrenamiento-en-Atletismo. Archived from the original (PDF) on August 3, 2012.
- Jain, Nitin B.; Borg-Stein, Joanne; Miranda-Comas, Gerardo; Micheo, William; Visco, Christopher; Fredericson, Michael (April 2020). "Recommendations for Enhancing Sports Medicine Fellowship Training". American Journal of Physical Medicine & Rehabilitation. 99 (4): 348–352. doi:10.1097/PHM.0000000000001332. PMID 31738281.
- Fredericson, Michael; Roche, Megan; Barrack, Michelle T; Tenforde, Adam; Sainani, Kristin; Kraus, Emily; Kussman, Andrea; Miller Olson, Emily; Kim, Brian Young; Fahy, Katherine; Miller, Emily; Diamond, Ellie; Meraz, Sonya; Singh, Sonal; Nattiv, Aurelia (May 2023). "Healthy Runner Project: a 7-year, multisite nutrition education intervention to reduce bone stress injury incidence in collegiate distance runners". BMJ Open Sport & Exercise Medicine. 9 (2) e001545. doi:10.1136/bmjsem-2023-001545. PMC 10174024. PMID 37180969.
- Fredericson, Michael; Cookingham, Curtis L.; Chaudhari, Ajit M.; Dowdell, Brian C.; Oestreicher, Nina; Sahrmann, Shirley A. (July 2000). "Hip Abductor Weakness in Distance Runners with Iliotibial Band Syndrome". Clinical Journal of Sport Medicine. 10 (3): 169–175. doi:10.1097/00042752-200007000-00004. PMID 10959926. S2CID 25967700.
- Tenforde, Adam S.; Sayres, Lauren C.; McCURDY, Mary Liz; Sainani, Kristin L.; Fredericson, Michael (October 2013). "Identifying Sex-Specific Risk Factors for Stress Fractures in Adolescent Runners". Medicine & Science in Sports & Exercise. 45 (10): 1843–1851. doi:10.1249/MSS.0b013e3182963d75. PMID 23584402.
- Fredericson, Michael; Misra, Anuruddh K (2007). "Epidemiology and Aetiology of Marathon Running Injuries". Sports Medicine. 37 (4): 437–439. doi:10.2165/00007256-200737040-00043. PMID 17465629. S2CID 8929992.
- Fredericson, Michael; Ngo, Jessica; Cobb, Kristin (May 2005). "Effects of Ball Sports on Future Risk of Stress Fracture in Runners". Clinical Journal of Sport Medicine. 15 (3): 136–141. doi:10.1097/01.jsm.0000165489.68997.60. PMID 15867555. S2CID 40008532.
- Fredericson, Michael; Cookingham, Curtis L.; Chaudhari, Ajit M.; Dowdell, Brian C.; Oestreicher, Nina; Sahrmann, Shirley A. (July 2000). "Hip Abductor Weakness in Distance Runners with Iliotibial Band Syndrome". Clinical Journal of Sport Medicine. 10 (3): 169–175. doi:10.1097/00042752-200007000-00004. PMID 10959926. S2CID 25967700.
- Saltychev, M.; Laimi, K.; Virolainen, P.; Fredericson, M. (December 2018). "Effectiveness of Hydrodilatation in Adhesive Capsulitis of Shoulder: A Systematic Review and Meta-Analysis". Scandinavian Journal of Surgery. 107 (4): 285–293. doi:10.1177/1457496918772367. PMID 29764307.
- Altman, Roy; Fredericson, Michael; Bhattacharyya, Samir; Bisson, Brad; Abbott, Thomas; Yadalam, Sashidhar; Kim, Myoung (7 December 2015). "Association between Hyaluronic Acid Injections and Time-to-Total Knee Replacement Surgery". The Journal of Knee Surgery. 29 (7): 564–570. doi:10.1055/s-0035-1568992. PMID 26641076. S2CID 13106606.

== Awards and recognition ==
- Phi Beta Kappa National Collegiate Honor Society (1982)
- Alpha Omega Alpha (Junior Year)
- National Medical Honor Society (2003)
- Jose C. Montero, MD, Excellence in Teaching Award Stanford PM&R Residency Program
- Fellow, American College of Sports Medicine (2003)
- Excellence in Musculoskeletal Med Award, Kessler Institute and Univ of Med, New Jersey Med School (2007)
- Jerome Gersten, MD, Memorial Lectureship, University of Colorado Department of PM&R (2010)
- Best Musculoskeletal Research Award, American Academy of PM&R (2011)
- Physiatric Assoc of Spine, Sports & Occupational Rehabilitation (PASSOR) Mid-Career Achievement Award, American Academy of PM&R (2011)
- James D. Thompson MD, Humanitarian Award, Stanford PM&R Residency Program (2011)
- Nadler Research Award, Foundation of PM&R (2015–16)
- Clinical Research Grant Award, American Medical Society for Sports Medicine (2018–19)
- Distinguished Member Award, American Academy of PM&R (2023)
