= George Stouffer =

American cardiologist

George "Rick" Stouffer
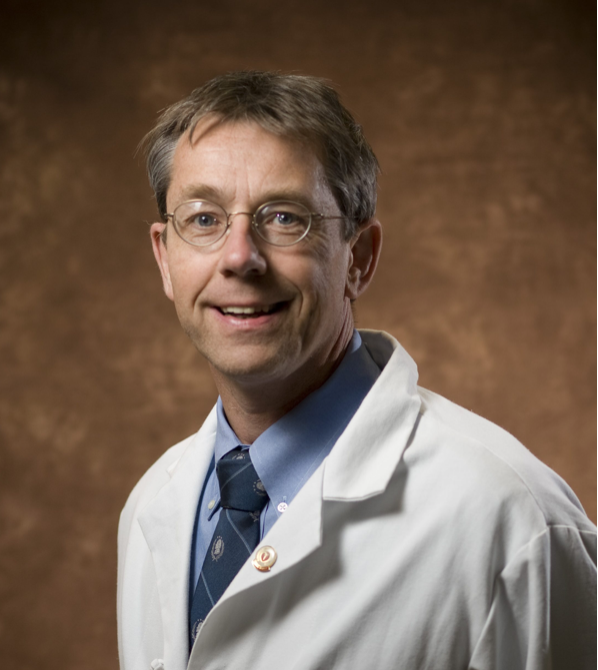
- Occupation: Chief of Cardiology at UNC Medical Center

George "Rick" Stouffer is an American cardiologist who is Chief of the Division of Cardiology at the University of North Carolina Medical Center, where he is a practicing interventional cardiologist. Stouffer was awarded the Ernest and Hazel Craige Distinguished Professorship of Medicine in 2018; prior to that he was the Henry A. Foscue Distinguished Professor of Medicine. Stouffer is also co-director of the McAllister Heart Institute. He is known for his research regarding inpatient ST elevation myocardial infarctions.

== Education and Training ==
Stouffer attended Bucknell University and graduated magna cum laude in 1980. During his time at Bucknell, Stouffer was inducted into both the Phi Beta Kappa and Tau Beta Pi honor societies. Stouffer attended the University of Maryland School of Medicine and was inducted into the Alpha Omega Alpha honor society. He completed his postgraduate medical training at the University of Virginia between 1987 and 1995. Throughout these eight years he completed his internal medicine residency, his cardiovascular research fellowship, his clinical cardiology fellowship, and his interventional cardiology fellowship.

== Professional career ==
Stouffer was on the faculty at the University of Texas Medical Branch in Galveston, Texas from 1995-2000. In 2000, Stouffer moved to UNC and was awarded the Henry A. Foscue Distinguished Professor of Medicine in 2005, and later awarded the Ernest and Hazel Craige Distinguished Professor of Medicine in 2018. From 2001-2016 he was the Director of the Cardiac Catheterization Laboratories and the Director of Interventional Cardiology. He was appointed Chief of the Division of Cardiology in 2013.

== Research and publications ==
Stouffer has published in journals such as the Journal of the American Medical Association (JAMA), Journal of the American College of Cardiology (JACC), Circulation, Nature Reviews, JAMA-Cardiology, the Journal of the American Heart Association (JAHA), Journal of Investigative Medicine (JIM), American Heart Journal, American Journal of the Medical Sciences, Journal of Vascular Medicine and Biology and Transactions of the American Clinical and Climatological Association. He serves on the Editorial Boards of JACC-Cardiovascular Interventions and the American Journal of Cardiology. One focus of Stouffer's recent clinical research is on patients who have a ST elevation myocardial infarction (STEMI) while hospitalized for a non-cardiac condition. Stouffer's group has published the largest study on "inpatient" STEMIs and also developed a quality improvement program to expedite treatment of these patients. Stouffer was the senior author on a study that was featured in the Wall Street Journal in 2015.

Another focus of Stouffer's clinical research is on using CYP2C19 genotyping to identify the best anti-platelet agent for patients with acute coronary syndromes and/or undergoing percutaneous coronary intervention. Stouffer's laboratory has a long-standing interest in understanding the direct effects of thrombin on smooth muscle cells (SMC). Stouffer's laboratory is also interested in the role that β3 integrins play in mediating SMC responses to thrombin. His studies have focused on identifying mechanisms whereby β3 integrins mediate responses to thrombin and other SMC agonists.

Stouffer's early studies examined the mechanisms by which soluble growth factors stimulate smooth muscle cell proliferation.

== Textbooks ==
Stouffer has published three textbooks: Cardiology Board Review: ECG, Hemodynamic and Angiographic Unknowns (2019); Practical ECG Interpretation: Clues to Heart Disease in Young Adults (2009); and Cardiovascular Hemodynamics for the Clinician (2008; second edition in 2017). He was an editor for the second (2010) and third (2019) editions of Netter's Cardiology along with Marschall S. Runge M.D., Cam Patterson M.D. and Joseph S. Rossi M.D. This book utilizes artwork from the famous medical illustrator, the late Frank H. Netter, to provide an overview of cardiovascular anatomy, pathophysiology, diagnosis and management.

== Personal life ==
Stouffer lives in Chapel Hill. He and his wife, Meg, have four adult children.
