= Perry Nisen =

American physician

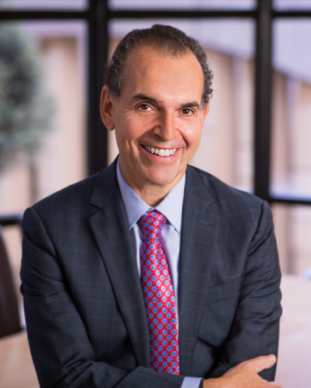
- Born: July 27, 1955 (age 71); New York, NY
- Education: Stanford, Albert Einstein College of Medicine
- Known for: Cancer drug discovery and development, clinical trial data sharing, deletions by transposons, X-recessive disorders in females, molecular genetics of human cancers
- Scientific career
- Fields: Molecular Biology, Clinical Translation, Drug Discovery and Development, Clinical Data Sharing, Executive Management, Governance
- Workplaces: Sanford Burnham Prebys Medical Discovery Institute GlaxoSmithKline, Abbott Laboratories
- Thesis: Flexible Genomes: Observations on the Rearrangement of DNA Sequences
- Doctoral advisor: Stanley Norman Cohen (pre-doctoral), Lucy Shapiro(doctoral)

Perry Nisen is an American physician and the former chief executive officer (CEO) of the Sanford Burnham Prebys Medical Discovery Institute (SBP), and held the Donald Bren Chief Executive Chair.

== Early life and education ==
Nisen received his B.S. degree from Stanford University, M.D. and Ph.D. from the Albert Einstein College of Medicine, and has been a resident at Columbia University College of Physicians and Surgeons.

== Career ==
At one point, he was the Lowe Foundation Professor of Neuro-Oncology at the University of Texas Southwestern Medical Center. He headed a basic research laboratory and was a practicing physician in pediatric hematology-oncology. He was a member of the Genetics and Development Graduate Training Program.

Nisen has worked in GlaxoSmithKline (GSK), holding such positions as interim Chief Medical Officer, Senior Vice President and Oncology Therapy Area Head, Senior Vice President of Cancer Research, and Senior Vice President of Clinical Pharmacology and Discovery Medicine. At one point, he was appointed as Senior Vice President of Science and Innovation at (GSK), contributing to the discovery, development and commercialization of a number of drugs.

He had been appointed as CEO in August 2014.

== Awards and honors ==
- Alpha Omega Alpha
- Macintosh Fellowship, Columbia University College of Physicians and Surgeons
- Basil O'Connor Research Award of the March of Dimes
- Lowe Foundation Professorship UT Southwestern
- Woodward Visiting Scholar, Harvard University
