= Eric Keroack =

American doctor (1960–2008)

- Born: 1960
- Died: 2008 (aged 47–48)
- Education: Tufts University School of Medicine
- Occupation: Deputy Assistant Secretary for Population Affairs at the United States Department of Health and Human Services

Eric J. Keroack (1960 – April 4, 2008) was an American obstetrician-gynecologist. He worked briefly in a pregnancy-related program at the United States Department of Health and Human Services during 2006–2007.

== Education ==
Keroack was a graduate of Amherst College. He received his doctorate of medicine in 1986 from Tufts University where he was a member of the Alpha Omega Alpha medical honor society and later Resident of the Year (1993). He was a Fellow of the American College of Obstetrician Gynecologists [(FACOG)], and a clinician with nearly two decades of experience serving women from diverse racial and socio-economic backgrounds.

== Career ==
Keroack was the medical director of A Woman's Concern, a Christian nonprofit organization based in Dorchester, Boston, Massachusetts. It runs six centers in the state that offer free pregnancy testing, ultrasounds and counseling and works to "help women escape the temptation and violence of abortion." Its crisis pregnancy centers do not sell abortion services and do not prescribe or distribute birth control.

In late 2006, he was named as the Deputy Assistant Secretary for Population Affairs at the Department of Health and Human Services, the office that oversees federally funded teenage pregnancy, family planning, and abstinence programs. The nomination of Keroack, an anti-contraceptive advocate, to a position responsible for ensuring low-income women get access to birth control was controversial.

The Massachusetts native had attracted controversy before, after claiming that sex with multiple partners hurts women's ability to bond by altering their brain chemistry. He said that premarital sex suppresses the hormone oxytocin, thereby impairing people's ability to forge successful long-term relationships.

In January 2007, Keroack received "two formal warnings from the Massachusetts board of medicine ordering him to refrain from prescribing drugs to people who are not his patients and from providing mental health counseling without proper training." In March 2007 Keroack resigned from his position at HHS.

== Death ==
Keroack died in 2008. He had a daughter.
