= Placida Gardner Chesley =

American medical doctor and college professor (1879–1966)

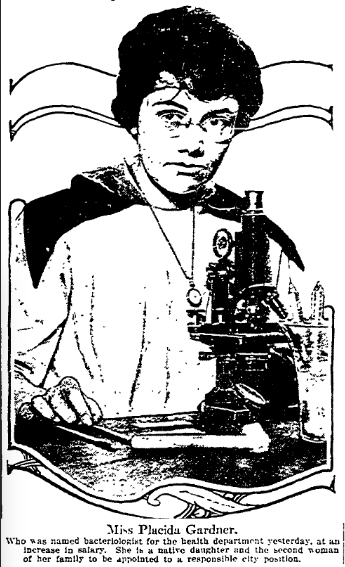
Placida Gardner, from a 1917 publication.

Placida Gardner Chesley (August 22, 1879 — April 9, 1966) was an American medical doctor and college professor. She was the City Bacteriologist of Los Angeles, and worked in Europe with the Red Cross during World War I.

== Early life ==
Vera Placida Gardner was born in Orange, California, the daughter of Henri F. Gardner and Emma Howard Gardner. She attended Santa Ana High School, and completed undergraduate studies the University of Southern California, graduating in 1910. She earned her medical degree at the University of Michigan, where she was elected to the medical honor fraternity Alpha Omega Alpha.

== Career ==
Gardner taught pathology, toxicology, physiology, histology, and chemistry at the University of Southern California. She was also on staff at Los Feliz Hospital. In January 1917 she was appointed to the office of City Bacteriologist with the Health Department of the City of Los Angeles. She and her sister Margaret Gardner (a lawyer) went to France in 1918 with the Stanford Women's Relief Unit, along with Clelia Duel Mosher and others. Placida Gardner supervised sanitary conditions in Red Cross canteens. She described her experiences working with the Red Cross on embarkation at St. Nazaire in an essay for the Stanford Illustrated Review.

She advised on hospital and laboratory rebuilding, cholera prevention, and vaccine production as head of Red Cross Laboratories in Warsaw, Poland during the postwar period. Of the University of Warsaw Research Laboratory, which she oversaw, the Iowa Medical Society assured its members that "It is the finest in Poland, and one of the most complete and up-to-date in the world.... No gift of the American people to suffering Poland is more valuable than this great hospital laboratory."

== Personal life ==
Placida Gardner met Lt. Col. Albert Justus Chesley, a fellow American doctor, while working in France. They married while still abroad, in 1920. After returning to the United States later that year, they lived in his hometown, Minneapolis, Minnesota. Their daughter Louise was born in 1924, when Placida was 45 years old. Placida Gardner Chesley was widowed when Albert died in 1955. She died in 1966, aged 86. Her remains were buried with her husband's, at Fort Snelling National Cemetery in Minneapolis.

The Albert J. and Placida Chesley Papers are archived at the Minnesota Historical Society.
