= Richard Barohn =

American neurologist

Richard J. Barohn, MD, has served as the executive vice chancellor for health affairs at the University of Missouri since 2020 and as the Hugh E. and Sarah D. Stephenson dean of the University of Missouri School of Medicine since 2022.

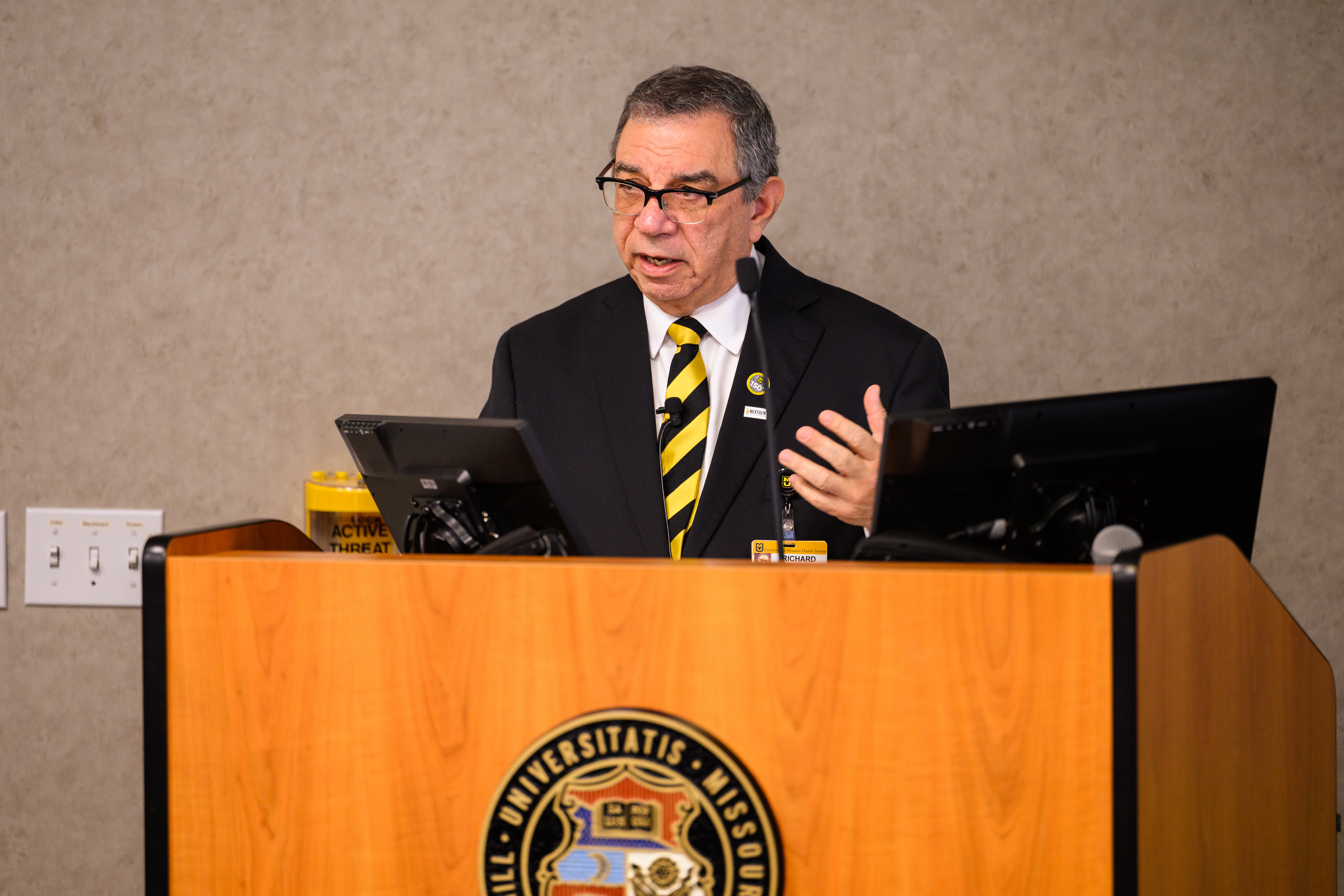
Dr. Barohn gives remarks at a University of Missouri School of Medicine event in 2024.

== Early life and education ==
Barohn was born and raised in St. Louis, Missouri. He graduated from the University of Missouri-Kansas City with a Bachelor of Arts in 1975 and Doctor of Medicine in 1980. He was among the earliest graduates of the UMKC School of Medicine in the combined BA-MD six-year program.

Barohn completed both a medical internship in 1981 and residency in neurology in 1986 at the Wilford Hall U.S. Air Force Medical Center. He conducted his fellowship in neuromuscular disease in 1987 at the Ohio State University. At Ohio State University, he trained under Drs. Gerry Mendell, Zarife Sahenk, John Kissel and Jack Warmolts.

== Career ==
Military service

Following his medical internship at the Wilford Hall U.S. Air Force Medical Center in San Antonio, Texas, Barohn was deployed to a U.S. Air Force base in Cambridgeshire, United Kingdom, RAF Alconbury, where he served as a general medical officer from 1981-83. After completing his fellowship at the Ohio State University, he returned to active duty as a staff neurologist at the Wilford Hall U.S. Air Force Medical Center from 1987-89.

Barohn completed 20 years of military service, nine years active duty from 1980 – 89 and 11 years in the U.S. Air Force Reserves 1989 – 2000. He retired as a lieutenant colonel.

University of Texas Health Science Center

Barohn joined the faculty at the University of Texas Health Science Center in San Antonio, Texas, as an assistant professor of neurology in 1989. While there, he established the neuromuscular program and instituted a clinical neurophysiology fellowship. Barohn’s first trainee, Carlayne E. Jackson, MD, FAAN, later became the president of the American Academy of Neurology.

University of Texas-Southwestern Medical Center

In 1993, Barohn moved to Dallas, Texas, as an associate of professor of neurology at the University of Texas-Southwestern Medical Center. He held several positions at the institution during his tenure, including the Lois C.A. and Darwin E. Smith Distinguished Chair in Neurological Mobility Research. He was one of the leaders who developed a large neuromuscular team that included Drs. Wilson Bryan, Ronald Haller and Suzanne Ainnaccone. He and the team developed a neuromuscular fellowship training program. In 1997, Barohn was promoted to professor of neurology and he also became the interim chair of the Department of Neurology.

University of Kansas Medical Center

Barohn joined the University of Kansas Medical Center in 2001 as chair of the Department of Neurology and held the role for 16 years. During his tenure, he grew the department’s faculty from five to more than 50 neurologists and established multiple fellowship programs. Barohn was named the Gertrude and Dewey Ziegler endowed chair and professor of neurology in 2007.

In 2004, Barohn was appointed the program director of the University of Kansas General Clinical Research Center and he obtained NIH funding for the center in 2007. That same year, he and his team also began developing the University of Kansas’s Clinical and Translational Science Institute, later renamed Frontiers. He later served as director for 13 years. Barohn and his team received the Clinical Translational Science Award from the NIH in 2011, which was re-funded in 2017.

He held multiple positions in the Kansas City area throughout his near 20-year tenure, including chief of neurology service at KU Hospital (2002–16), staff physician at the Kansas City VA Medical Center (2001–14), director of the ALS Clinic at the KU Medical Center (2001–07), and president of the KU Neurology Foundation (2001–16).

From 2015-20, Barohn served as both the president of the research institute and vice chancellor for research.

Together with the KU Library, Barohn launched the RRNMF Neuromuscular Journal in 2020, providing colleagues in the field of neuromuscular medicine with publishing opportunities in an online and open-access journal devoted to neuromuscular disorders.

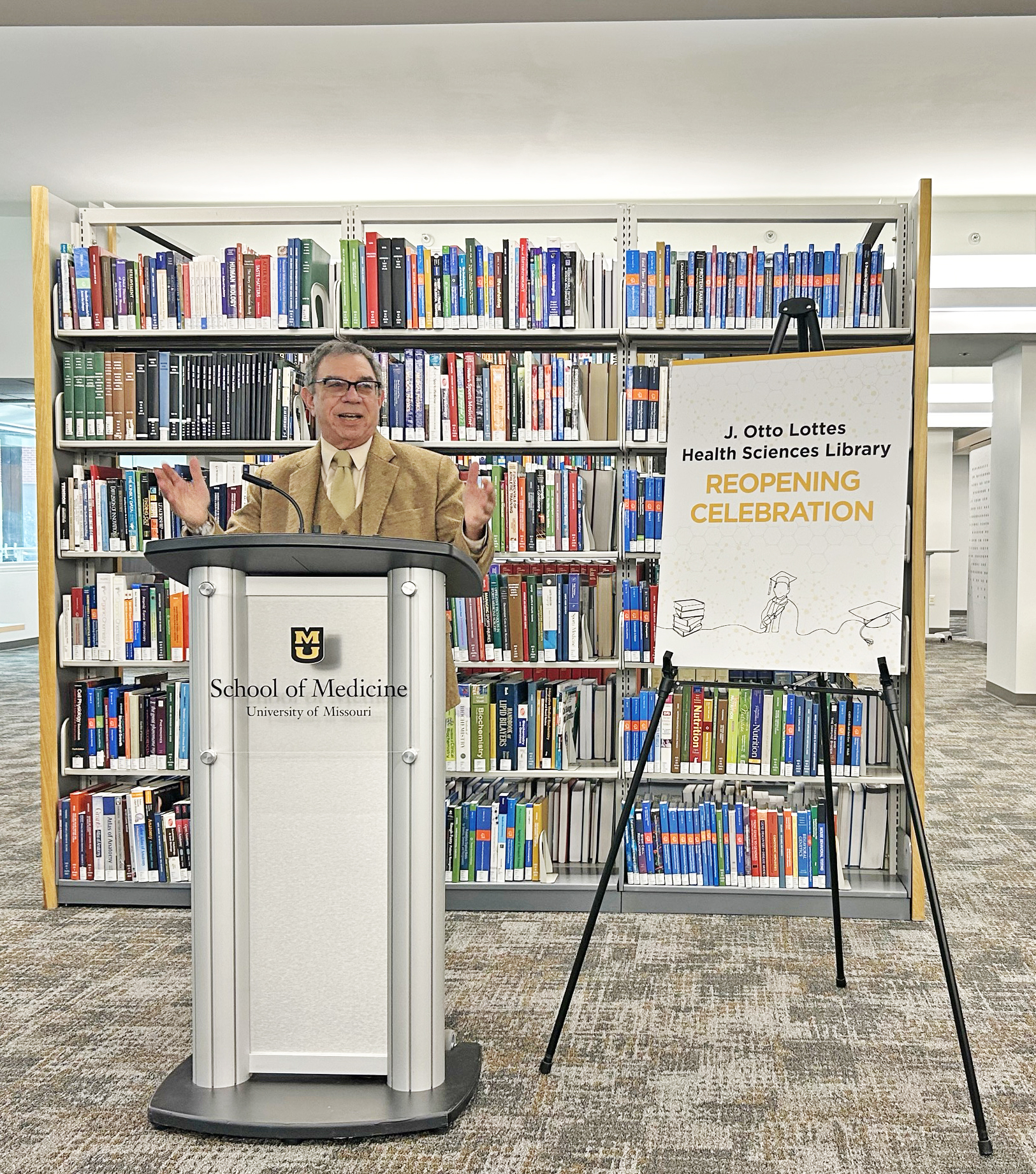
Dr. Barohn outlines the newest additions to the redesigned J. Otto Lottes Health Sciences Library.

University of Missouri

Barohn was appointed the executive vice chancellor for health affairs in May 2020 and Hugh E. and Sarah D. Stephenson Dean of the University of Missouri School of Medicine in 2022. At MU, he currently serves as the highest healthcare administrator, overseeing the medical school, the MU Health Care academic medical center and the NextGen Precision Health initiative.

As the founding editor, Barohn and the MU School of Medicine launched Missouri Health, an online, open-access, peer-reviewed journal, featuring published scholarly works from students, residents, fellows and faculty.

== Neuromuscular study group (NMSG) ==
Barohn played a pivotal role into the creation of the Neuromuscular Study Group (NMSG), founded in 1999 by Robert C. Griggs, MD, of the University of Rochester School of Medicine and Dentistry. Barohn served as the co-chair of this group of international experts specializing in clinical and translational research in neuromuscular disease. In 2012, he succeeded Dr. Griggs to become the chair of NMSG.

Awards and honors

- Civilian National Consultant for Neurology to the U.S. Air Force Surgeon General (2000-2010)
- Retired Lt. Col., U.S. Air Force Reserves (2000–present)
- University of Missouri School of Medicine Kansas City Alumni Achievement Award (2000)
- Fellow, American Academy of Neurology (2002)
- Alumni inductee of the Missouri Delta Chapter of Alpha Omega Alpha Honor Medical Society, University of Missouri Kansas City, School of Medicine (2003)
- University of Kansas Chancellor’s Club Research Award (2012)
- University Distinguish Professor, University of Kansas (2013)
- Association of Neuromuscular & Electrodiagnostic Medicine Distinguished Researcher Award (2013)
- George Brett ALS Commitment Award, ALS Association, Mid-America Chapter (2016)
- Association of American Physician’s – elected (2018)
- Distinguished Professor Emeritus, University of Kansas (2020)
- E. Grey Dimond, M.D. Take Wing Award, University of Missouri-Kansas City School of Medicine (2023)
