= Patricia Flint Borns =

American radiologist

- Born: February 17, 1922; Barstow, California, US
- Died: April 15, 2009 (aged 87); Princeton, New Jersey, US
- Education: Purdue University, Woman's Medical College of Pennsylvania
- Known for: Pediatric Radiology
- Spouse: William J. Borns
- Children: 2
- Scientific career
- Fields: Medicine, Pediatric Radiology
- Workplaces: Thomas Jefferson University, Children's Hospital of Pennsylvania, Hahnemann University Hospital, A.I. duPont Institute for Children

Patricia Flint Borns (17 February 1922 – 15 April 2009) was a pediatric radiologist.

== Education ==
Borns received her Bachelor in Science from Purdue and her medical degree from Woman's Medical College of Pennsylvania where she was elected to Alpha Omega Alpha.

Borns completed her medical internship at Philadelphia General Hospital and subsequently completed a radiology residency at the University of Pennsylvania where she trained under Dr. Henry Pendergrass and was the first female graduate of the program.

== Career ==
First working at Thomas Jefferson University hospital, she went on to work and head the department of radiology at the Children's Hospital of Pennsylvania, Hahnemann University Hospital, and A.I. duPont Institute for Children. She retired from medicine in 1990. For her service, an endowed chair was created at the Children's Hospital of Philadelphia.

== Research ==
During Borns' research career she published on a wide range of pediatric radiology topics.

== Selected publications ==
- Borns, PF; Rancier, LF (September 1974). "Cerebral calcification in childhood leukemia mimicking Sturge-Weber syndrome. Report of two cases". The American Journal of Roentgenology, Radium Therapy, and Nuclear Medicine. 122 (1): 52–5. doi:10.2214/ajr.122.1.52. PMID 4528999.;
- HOPE, JW; BORNS, PF; BERG, PK (September 1965). "Roentgenologic Manifestations of Hirschsprung's Disease in Infancy". The American Journal of Roentgenology, Radium Therapy, and Nuclear Medicine. 95: 217–29. doi:10.2214/ajr.95.1.217. PMID 14344366.;
- Kohn, G; Borns, PF (July 1973). "The association of bilateral and unilateral renal aplasia in the same family". The Journal of Pediatrics. 83 (1): 95–7. doi:10.1016/s0022-3476(73)80324-5. PMID 4797640.;
- Salerno, NR; Menges, JF; Borns, PF (January 1972). "Arthrograms in hemophilia". Radiology. 102 (1): 135–8. doi:10.1148/102.1.135. PMID 5008134.;
- Hope, JW; Borns, PF (December 1965). "Radiologic diagnosis of primary and metastatic cancer in infants and children". Radiologic Clinics of North America. 3 (3): 353–74. doi:10.1016/S0033-8389(22)02837-8. PMID 5846850. S2CID 39415645.

== Memberships ==
- American College of Radiology Fellow

== Awards ==
- 1995: Richard D. Wood Alumni Award - “To Patricia Flint Borns, M.D., outstanding alumna, a most distinguished Pediatric Radiologist, teacher, valued friend and colleague. April 7, 1995.”
- 1996: Outstanding Educator Award of the Philadelphia Roentgen Ray Society
