= Daniel Roses =

American surgeon

Daniel F. Roses (11 April 1945 – 25 July 2025) was an American surgeon and professor of surgery and oncology at New York University School of Medicine, and a senior attending surgeon at Tisch Hospital of NYU Langone Health.

His research interests are the surgical and systemic treatment of cancer and the surgical treatment of thyroid and parathyroid disease.

== Career ==
Following surgical training at the NYU-Bellevue Medical Center, Roses served as a lieutenant commander with the Medical Corps of the US Navy. After his service, he returned to the New York University School of Medicine as a clinical fellow of the American Cancer Society.

He was the Director of the Breast Cancer Discovery Fund and the Cancer Surgery Research Fund at the NYU School of Medicine. He was also the Principal Investigator at NYU for the National Cancer Institute Multicenter Sentinel Lymphadenectomy Trial for melanoma.

Roses is a Fellow of the American College of Surgeons. He served as the New York State Chairman for its Commission on Cancer and as President of the New York Surgical Society (2008–2009). He was a member of over 20 professional societies, including the American Surgical Association, Alpha Omega Alpha, the Society of Surgical Oncology, the Society of University Surgeons, the American Association for Cancer Research, and the American Society of Clinical Oncology.

== Awards and honors ==
Roses received the following awards:

- Daniel G. Miller Excellence in Medicine Award from the Israel Cancer Research Fund (2011);
- Wings of Hope Humanitarian Award from the Melanoma Research Foundation (2011);
- Solomon A. Bersin Alumni Achievement Award in Clinical Science from the NYU School of Medicine (2005);
- Physician of the Year Award from the Rambam Medical Center in Israel (1999);
- Gender Equity Award from the American Medical Women's Association (1998);
- Albert Gallatin Medical Alumni Award from the NYU School of Medicine (1997)
- Manhattan Breast Cancer Awareness Award (1997);
- Great Teacher Award from New York University (1993);
- Distinguished Teacher Award from the NYU School of Medicine (1980, 1981, 1983, 1991, and 1993).

== Published works ==
Roses authored or co-authored over 250 published manuscripts, abstracts, chapters, and three books.

- Cutaneous Malignant Melanoma, 1983. W.B. Saunders. ISBN 0721677061.
- Breast Cancer, 1999 and 2005. Elsevier Churchill Livingstone. ISBN 9780443066344.

== Personal life ==
He and his wife, Helene, have three children and six grandchildren.
