= Jeffrey Gusky =

American photographer

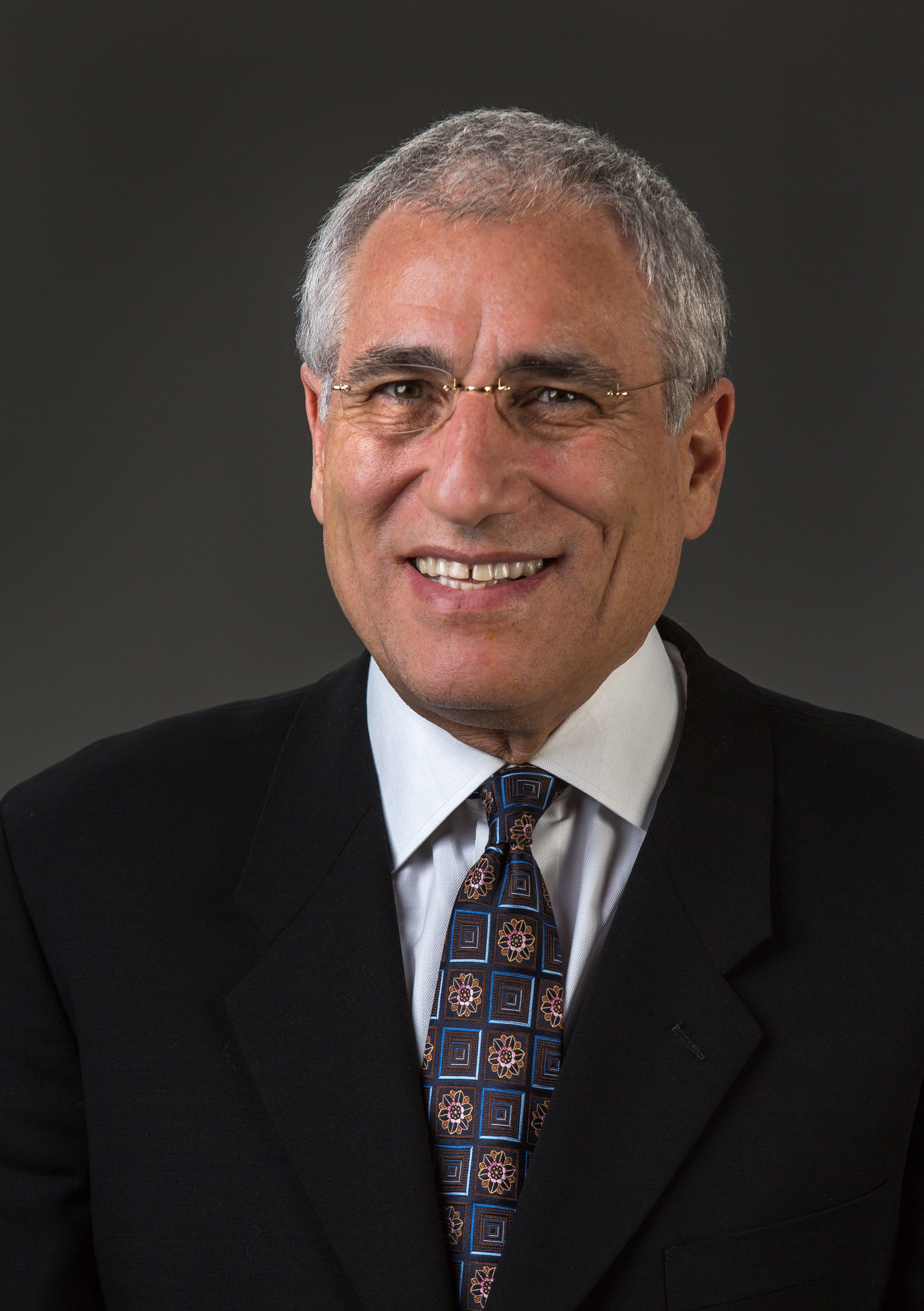
- Born: Pittsburgh, Pennsylvania
- Occupations: Emergency Physician, Explorer, Photographer and Television Host
- Website: jeffgusky.com

Jeff Gusky is an American emergency physician, explorer, photographer and television host. Gusky is best known for finding and photographing a series of underground cities adjacent to the former front-line World War I trenches along the Western Front in France. His work was featured by National Geographic magazine in their August, 2014 issue to mark the beginning of the World War I centennial.

== Medical career ==
Gusky is a 1982 graduate of the University of Washington School of Medicine, where he was inducted into the Alpha Omega Alpha medical honor society. As a rural emergency physician and instrument-rated pilot, he has often flown to medically underserved areas across Texas and Oklahoma to provide last-minute physician staffing of rural emergency rooms. In 2009, Gusky was designated a Fellow of the American College of Emergency Physicians.

== The Hidden World of World War I ==
Dr. Gusky obtained exclusive access to dozens of former World War I underground cities found beneath privately owned farms in the French countryside, located in centuries-old rock quarries from which the stone used to build castles, cathedrals and homes was mined. At the beginning of the war, these often vast subterranean spaces were converted to modern underground cities, by armies on both sides, using the technologies of the day: railways, electrical power plants, telephone networks, hospitals, food and water systems, theaters, chapels, housing and offices.

Gusky estimates that tens of thousands of soldiers lived underground at any given time throughout the war. Many left their mark by carving evocative stone sculptures and leaving hand-written inscriptions on stone as they wanted someone to know that they once lived and that their lives mattered. The underground cities "provided soldiers shelter from the horrors of war on the surface."

In 2015, LensCulture Magazine described the link between Gusky's mission as an explorer and his mission as an emergency physician, "Gusky forms intimate bonds with complete strangers, helping to guide patients and their families on a journey through darkness to light and always towards hope." Gusky's work as an emergency physician is grounded in helping patients circumvent immediate danger. In 2017, Gusky hosted The Smithsonian Channel television documentary, Americans Underground: Secret City of WWI.

== Silent Places ==
Silent Places: Landscapes of Jewish Life and Loss in Eastern Europe was authored by Jeffrey Gusky and published by Overlook Duckworth in 2003. In 1995, Gusky visited Poland for the first time. His goal was to learn more about what Judaism meant to him. At the site of the former Plaszow Nazi concentration camp (depicted in Schindler's List), located just outside Kraków, Poland, Gusky found an original remnant of the camp that had been largely forgotten, even by local residents. Gusky has stated that in this place “It was as if an intuitive switch flipped on inside me, and it has remained on ever since.”

Released in 2003, Silent Places: Landscapes of Jewish Life and Loss in Eastern Europe was Gusky’s first book of photography. The book documents the modern remains of the destroyed civilization of Eastern European Jewry. According to Gusky, "His work as a physician is integrally related to his work as an explorer and photographer."

== Bordertown ==
Bordertown: The Odyssey of an American Place, was co-authored with Benjamin Heber Johnson and published by Yale University Press in 2008. According to the Dallas Observer, Bordertown contributes to a "larger mosaic about American identity". A selection of Gusky's photographs of Roma, Texas were reproduced as an online slide show in the Dallas Observer.

== Turtle Creek ==
In 2008, Gusky conceived and implemented a public arts project for the Turtle Creek Association titled: Reimagining Dallas, an intimate walk along Turtle Creek.

== Exhibitions ==
A traveling exhibition curated by the Santa Barbara Museum of Art paired Gusky's Poland photographs with the work of the legendary 20th Century photographer Roman Vishniac in an exhibit titled Of Life and Loss: The Polish Photographs of Roman Vishniac and Jeffrey Gusky. While the exhibit was installed at the Detroit Institute of Arts Museum, Artnet Magazine ranked the exhibit a "Top Twenty Show".".

Exhibitions of Gusky include:

- 14-18 Contraste D’ Une Guerre at the MUSÉE D'ART ET D’HISTOIRE in Sainte Menehould France, 2017
- "Artist Soldiers" exhibition at Smithsonian National Air & Space Museum, 2017
- The People in the Picture (Broadway Play Starring Donna Murphy), 2011
- Afterimage Gallery, 2009-2010
- Of Life and Loss: The Poland Photographs of Roman Vishniac and Jeffrey Gusky, 2008
- Goya-Gusky: Images of Human Tragedy in Black and White, 2003-2004
- The Landscape of Loss, 2002
- The Presence of Absence, 2001
