= Linda M. Brzustowicz =

American geneticist

Linda M. Brzustowicz (born November 13, 1960) is a professor of genetics at Rutgers University and a member of the Motif BioSciences Scientific Advisory Board, whose main purpose is to develop technology that will benefit all laboratories using "biosamples," or samples of blood, DNA, stem cells, etc. that advance the field of human genetics. She has produced notable research in human gene functions in both the pathologic and normal states, contributing to the understanding of genetics of schizophrenia, autism, and specific language impairment (SLI). Because the diagnosed cases of childhood autism have experienced an unprecedented spike in recent times, causing speculation about the debatable "autism epidemic," such research is invaluable.

== Research ==
Brzustowicz and other geneticists at Rutgers are currently organizing a project to collect a new sample of families chosen for both autism and a history of language impairment in non-autistic family members in order to conduct a genome scan. In addition they are currently conducting genetic association studies of autism using samples from the AGRE and NIMH Human Genetics Initiative collections.

Brzustowicz and others, in collaboration with Dr. Anne Bassett at the University of Toronto, have conducted a genome-wide genetic linkage study of schizophrenia with a set of moderately large extended families from eastern Canada, and have identified "a major schizophrenia susceptibility locus on chromosome 1q21-22 with a multipoint lod score of 6.50 (p<0.0002)." Using the Positive and Negative Syndrome Scale (PANSS), they have also detected a significant linkage of the severity of positive symptoms of schizophrenia to chromosome 6.

== Awards ==
- 2005 NARSAD Staglin Family Music Festival Schizophrenia Research Award
- 2000 NARSAD Independent Investigator Award
- 1996 New York State Psychiatric Institute, Centennial Award, Alumna of the Decade, 1990s
- 1994 New York State Psychiatric Institute Alumni Award for Research
- 1994 Mead Johnson Travel Fellow to the American College of Neuropsychopharmacology
- 1993 Ginsberg Fellow to the Group for the Advancement of Psychiatry
- 1990 NARSAD Young Investigator Award
- 1987 Alpha Omega Alpha Medical Honor Society
- 1987 Lange Medical Award for pre-clinical excellence in medical school
- 1987 Merck Award for overall academic excellence in medical school

== Education ==
- Columbia University, New York, NY, Department of Psychiatry, Presbyterian Hospital and New York State Psychiatric Institute, Psychiatric Residency Training, July 1991 - June 1994
- Columbia University, New York, NY, Department of Psychiatry, New York State Psychiatric Institute Research Fellow and, Keck Scholar in Molecular Genetics, July 1988 - June 1991
- Brown University, Providence, RI, Department of Pediatrics, Rhode Island Hospital, Pediatric Internship, July 1987 - June 1988
- Columbia University, New York, NY, College of Physicians and Surgeons, M.D. May 1987, Alpha Omega Alpha Honor Society
- Harvard University, Cambridge, MA, Harvard-Radcliffe Colleges, A.B. Cum Laude in Biochemical Sciences, June 1982, Elizabeth Cary Agassiz Scholar, John Harvard Scholarship

== See also ==
- NOS1AP
