= Ann Tilton =

Pediatric neurologist, scientist and department chair

- Born: 1951 (age 74–75); Kingsville, Texas, U.S.
- Education: Texas A&M; University of Texas Medical Branch
- Known for: Former (2nd woman) president of the Child Neurology Society; Former president of the Child Neurology Foundation; Former Vice President of the Board of the American Academy of Neurology; Chair of the American Board of Psychiatry and Neurology (ABPN); Chair of Meeting Management of the American Academy of Neurology
- Awards: 2024 American Academy of Neurology President's Award; 2022 American Academy of Neurology Mentor of the Year Award; 2022 American Academy of Pediatrics Award for Services to Special Needs Children; 2012 Child Neurology Society Hower Award
- Scientific career
- Fields: Neurology, pediatrics, spasticity, movement disorders
- Workplaces: Louisiana State University; Tulane University

Ann Henderson Tilton is Professor of Neurology and Pediatrics at Louisiana State University Health Services Center; and Section Chair of Child Neurology. She is director of the Rehabilitation Center at Children’s Hospital of New Orleans, director of the Comprehensive Spasticity Program, and co-director of the Muscular Dystrophy clinics.

The textbook Child Neurology: Its Origins, Founders, Growth and Evolution states that Tilton is "one of the most globally visible leaders within child neurology." Tilton has been very involved in international professional organizations. She is a fellow of the American Academy of Neurology, serving for many years as chair of the Meeting Management Committee, in 2011 as chair of the Child Neurology Section, and formerly as vice chair of the society.

Tilton was elected Councillor from the South of the Child Neurology Society in 1997, served as Secretary-Treasurer 2002–2004, and became president in 2005 - the second female president of the society, after Mary Anne Guggenheim in 1981.

Tilton has also been very active in the American Academy of Pediatrics, serving from 2002 to 2009 on the National Council for Children with Developmental Disabilities.

She has served as president of the patient advocacy group Child Neurology Foundation.

== Early life and education ==
Ann Henderson was born in Kingsville, Texas. She did her undergraduate training at the Texas A&M. She then went to the University of Texas Medical Branch for her MD.

== Career and research ==
In 1983, Tilton joined the faculty of the University of Texas Southwestern Medical School. Two years later, she joined the faculty of Louisiana State University in New Orleans. She was simultaneously appointed co-director of the Rehabilitation Center of the Children’s Hospital of New Orleans. In 1988 she became the Section Chair of Child Neurology at Louisiana State University and Program Director in Child Neurology at Tulane University School of Medicine.

=== Cerebral palsy and spasticity ===
In the 1990s, Tilton began discussing the use of botulinum toxin for spasticity with colleagues in orthopedics. Her early work with the toxin, which relaxes hypertonic muscles and can improve movement after damage to the central nervous system in conditions like cerebral palsy, led to the development of the research protocol that led to the approval of botulinum toxin by the Food and Drug Administration for spasticity in children. Tilton has published many articles and book chapters on the use of botulinum toxin in children. She was involved in published consensus guidelines and practice parameters for treatment of pediatric spasticity.

Botulinum toxin for acne

Tilton holds the patent for the use of botulinum toxin for acne, along with two other women from Louisiana State University.

=== History of neurology ===
While Tilton has not published extensively in the history of neurology, she co-wrote the chapter on "Child Neurology" with Patricia Crumrine in the history text American Board of Psychiatry and Neurology: Looking Back and Looking Ahead (editors Michael J. Aminoff and Larry R. Faulkner). At the annual 2020 American Academy of Neurology meeting, Tilton gave an informal "Head Talk" on the neurology of the Salem Witch Trials. She repeated the talk in 2021 and 2023. In 2022, she gave a "Head Talk" on whether neurological disorders could change the course of history.

== Awards and honors ==
- 2024 American Academy of Neurology President's Award
- 2022 American Academy of Neurology Mentor of the Year Award
- 2022 Louisiana Chapter of the American Academy of Pediatrics Dr. Bettina C. Hilman Award for Services to Special Needs Children
- 2012 Child Neurology Society Hower Lifetime Achievement Award
- Alpha Omega Alpha

== Personal life ==
Tilton is married to Greg Tilton, a cardiologist, and has four children.
