= Frank A. Chervenak =

American gynecologist

Frank A. Chervenak, MD currently serves as System Chief, Ethics Northwell Health and The Hugh RK Barber Professor, of Obstetrics and Gynecology and Associate Dean of International Medicine, Zucker School of Medicine at Hofstra/Northwell.

== Education and training ==
He received his Bachelor of Science degree from Pennsylvania State University with highest distinction, and his medical degree from Thomas Jefferson University where he was elected a member of Alpha Omega Alpha Medical Honor Society. Chervenak served his internship in Internal Medicine at New York Medical College, residency in Obstetrics and Gynecology at New York Medical College in St. Luke's Roosevelt Hospital Center (now Mount Sinai West) and a fellowship in Maternal Fetal Medicine at Yale University School of Medicine.

== Career ==
He was Assistant Professor of Obstetrics and Gynecology at Mount Sinai Medical Center, where he was also Director of Perinatal Research and received the Dr. Solomon Silver Award for application of advances in research to the practice of Clinical Medicine. Chervenak was appointed Associate Professor of Obstetrics and Gynecology and Director of Obstetric Ultrasound and Ethics at New York Hospital-Cornell Medical Center in 1987. In 1991 he was named Director of Maternal Fetal Medicine and Director of Obstetrics. In 1992 he was made Full Professor with tenure, in 1998 he was named Vice Chairman of the Department of Obstetrics and Gynecology, and in 1999 was named Acting Chairman of that department.

Chervenak has published over 300 papers in peer review literature and has co-authored or co-edited 36 textbooks. Research interests are in ultrasound, ethics, multiple gestation, and clinical obstetrics and gynecology.

Dr. Chervenak has been a member of:

- Board of Governors of the American Institute in Ultrasound and Medicine
- Society of Perinatal Obstetricians
- The Ian Donald Inter-University School of Medicine and Ultrasound
- World Society of Labor and Delivery
- World Association of Perinatal Medicine

He has served as president of:

- International Fetal Medicine in Surgery Society (past)
- New York Perinatal Society (past)
- New York Academy of Medicine Section of Obstetrics and Gynecology (past)
- International Society of the Fetus as a Patient (current)

He received a doctorum honoris causa from the Semmelweis University in Budapest, Hungary and has been named an honorary member of the Italian Society of Obstetrics and Gynecology.
