= Paul Nyirjesy =

American medical researcher

Paul Nyirjesy is a professor in the Department of Obstetrics and Gynecology at Drexel University, Philadelphia, and the director of the Drexel Vaginitis Center. In 2016, Nyirjesy announced positive results from a clinical trial for a potential vaccine against Vaginitis.

== Education ==
He completed a BA (chemistry; magna cum laude) at Amherst College in 1981. He completed an MD, Alpha Omega Alpha, at Georgetown University School of Medicine in 1985. His residency was in obstetrics and gynecology at Thomas Jefferson University and a fellowship in infectious disease at Temple University Hospital.

== Awards and honors ==
Starting in 1998, then annually since 2003, he has been listed as part of the Best Doctors in America. Philadelphia magazine listed his center, the Drexel Vaginitis Center, as the Best Places for Care of 2008. In 2010 he received the Drexel University College of Medicine "OB/GYN Faculty Resident Teaching Award". In 2011, he was selected to U.S. News & World Report in their Top Doctors list. Starting in 200? and then in 2002, and annually since 2005, he was named "Top Doc" by Philadelphia magazine.

== Publications ==
Some of his more recent publications and presentations are included in this list.

- Chronic Cervicitis: Presenting Features and Response to Therapy. Mattson SK, Polk JP, Nyirjesy P; J Low Genit Tract Dis. 2016-07-01.
- Non-albicans Candida Vulvovaginitis: Treatment Experience at a Tertiary Care Vaginitis Center. Powell AM, Gracely E, Nyirjesy P; J Low Genit Tract Dis. 2016-01-01.
- A Review of Evidence-Based Care of Symptomatic Trichomoniasis and Asymptomatic Trichomonas vaginalis Infections. Meites, E., Gaydos, C. A., Hobbs, M. M., Kissinger, P., Nyirjesy, P., Schwebke, J. R., Secor, W. E., Sobel, J. D., Workowski, K. A.; Clin. Infect. Dis., 2015 Nov 26.
