= Jose Wiley =

American physician and academic

Jose Manuel Wiley Ramos
- Born: San Juan, Puerto Rico
- Education: University of Dayton (BS); Universidad Central del Caribe (MD)
- Occupation: Interventional cardiologist
- Military career
- Allegiance: United States
- Branch: United States Army: United States Army Reserve; North Dakota Army National Guard
- Service years: 1994-2012
- Rank: Lieutenant colonel
- Conflicts: Iraq War

Jose Wiley is a Puerto Rican American physician-scientist, cardiologist and educator specializing in interventional cardiology. He holds the Sidney W. and Marilyn S. Lassen Chair of Cardiovascular Medicine, serves as Professor of Medicine, and is Chief of the Section of Cardiology at Tulane University School of Medicine in New Orleans, Louisiana. In addition, he serves as the Cardiovascular Service Line Chair for the LCMC Health System, overseeing the cardiovascular service lines across the LCMC network of hospitals.

== Education and Career ==
Earned a Bachelor of Science at the University of Dayton. He completed medical school at the Universidad Central del Caribe (UCC), Bayamon in June 1994. That same year, he joined the United States Army Reserve and later transferred to the North Dakota Army National Guard where he rose to the rank of Lieutenant Colonel. He was activated by the United States Army to serve two tours in support of the Operation Enduring Freedom at Landstuhl Regional Medical Center in Germany, treating wounded soldiers. Dr. Wiley was re-activated by the Army to serve with the 56 HHC Brigade, 28th Infantry Division, in Iraq. Completed a residency in internal medicine in 1998, followed by a fellowship in cardiology in 2001 at the Tulane University School of Medicine.

== Gift Project for Global Cardiovascular Health ==
In 2014, Wiley founded the Gift Project for Global Cardiovascular Health, a 501(c)(3) non-profit organization providing cardiopulmonary resuscitation and automated external defibrillator training to schoolchildren in developing countries.

== Awards and honors ==
- 2006 and 2008: Army Achievement Medal
- 2008: Army Commendation Medal
- 2012: Ellis Island Medal of Honor Recipient
- 2012: Man of the Year, awarded by the New York League of Puerto Rican Women for contributions to the Hispanic population of New York
- 2023: Healthcare Hero, New Orleans CityBusiness
- 2023, 2024, 2025: Castle Connolly Top Doctor
- February 24, 2025: Elected to membership in the Alpha Omega Alpha national medical honor society

=== Textbooks ===
- Wiley, J. M. (Ed.). (2019). Endovascular interventions. 1st Edition. Wiley-Blackwell. ISBN 978-1-119-28349-2
- Wiley, J. M. (Ed.). (2023). Endovascular Interventions: A Step-By-Step Approach. 1st Edition. Wiley-Blackwell. ISBN 9781119467786

=== Peer-reviewed Articles (Partial List) ===
- Terré, JA; Torrado, J; George, I; Harari, R; Cox-Alomar, PR; Villablanca, PA; Faillace, RT; Granada, JF; Dangas, G; Garcia, MJ; Latib, A; Wiley, J (Apr 2024). "Aortic Stenosis Management in Patients With Acute Hip Fracture". JACC Adv. 3 (5) 100912. doi:10.1016/j.jacadv.2024.100912. PMC 11198465. PMID 38939644.
- Di Biase, L; Lakkireddy, DJ; Marazzato, J; Velasco, A; Diaz, JC; Navara, R; Chrispin, J; Rajagopalan, B; Natale, A; Mohanty, S; Zhang, X; Della Rocca, D; Dalal, A; Park, K; Wiley, J; Batchelor, W; Cheung, JW; Dangas, G; Mehran, R; Jacc, Romero (2024). "Electrophysiology and Interventional Councils. Antithrombotic Therapy for Patients Undergoing Cardiac Electrophysiological and Interventional Procedures: JACC State-of-the-Art Review". J Am Coll Cardiol. 83 (1): 82–108. doi:10.1016/j.jacc.2023.09.831. PMID 38171713.
- Barzallo, D; Torrado, J; Benites-Moya, CJ; Sturla, M; Echarte-Morales, J; Scotti, A; Kharawala, A; Terre, JA; Sugiura, T; Wiley, J; Goldberg, Y; Latib, A (Mar 2024). "Acute Hemodynamic Compromise After Transcatheter Aortic Valve Replacement Due to Dynamic Left Ventricle Obstruction: A Systematic Review". Am J Cardiol. 214: 125–135. doi:10.1016/j.amjcard.2023.12.005. PMID 38103763.
