= Rajiv Ratan =

American physician

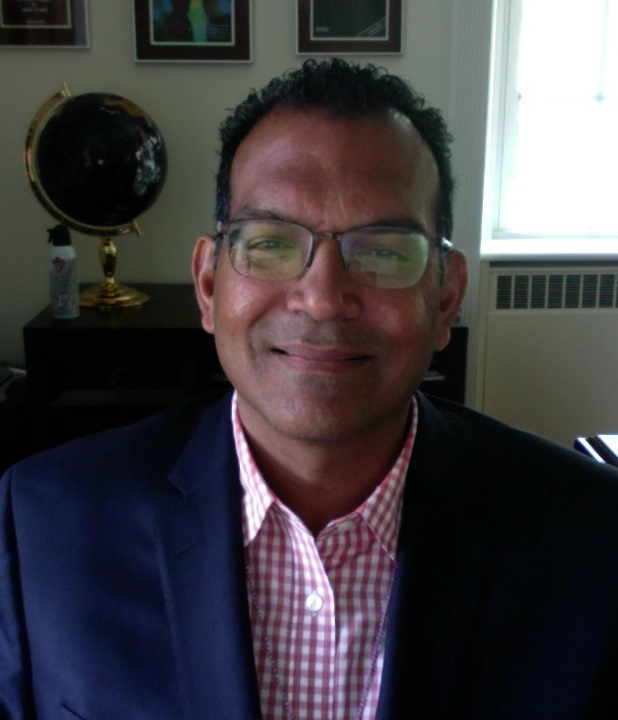
- Born: July 1960 (age 66); Pittsburgh Pennsylvania
- Occupations: Author, researcher, professor, administrator
- Spouse: Rini Ratan

Rajiv Ratan is an Indian American academic, professor, administrator and scientist based in New York. He is the Burke Professor of Neurology and Neuroscience at Weill Cornell Medicine. Since 2003, he has served as the executive director of Burke Neurological Institute and as a member of the Council of Affiliated Deans of Weill Cornell Medicine.

Ratan's scientific efforts primarily focus on understanding how neurons respond to physiological stresses, particularly oxidative stress, adaptively and maladaptively at a transcriptional level, and how the balance of these activities leads to neuronal death and impairment, or cell survival and recovery or resistance. He has published over 160 articles and has edited and contributed chapters to books. Ratan's studies have identified novel transcriptional and epigenetic strategies for limiting neuronal ferroptosis which have identified novel small molecule approach which have been validated in numerous neurological disease models.

== Early life and education ==
Ratan was born in July 1960 in Pittsburgh, Pennsylvania to immigrant parents from India. He attended the Webb School of California where he graduated with Honors in 1977. He completed his BA in Neuroscience from Amherst College in 1981 graduating magna cum laude and received the John Woodruff Simpson Fellowship in Medicine. At Amherst College, he completed an Honors thesis on the role of the cerebellum in regulating nuclei associated with emotion in the cerebrum. He later completed his M.D. and Ph.D. from the New York University School of Medicine in 1988, where he was named to the medical honor society, Alpha Omega Alpha.

Ratan's Ph.D. work was done with Michael Shelanski and Fred Maxfield and focused on ways to monitor calcium dynamically in living cells. After the completion of his NIH funded Medical Scientist Training Program Fellowship at NYU in 1988, he completed an Internship in Medicine at the University of Chicago Hospitals and Clinics and later became the Chief Resident in Neurology at Johns Hopkins Hospital. At Johns Hopkins, he received the Jay Slotkin Award for excellence in research. From 1992 to 1994, he was a clinical fellow in Neurorehabilitation and a research fellow in the Department of Neuroscience at Johns Hopkins, where he developed data related to programmed cell death and disease with Jay Baraban and Tim Murphy.

== Career ==
After completing his fellowship at Johns Hopkins, Ratan became Assistant Professor in Physical Medicine, Rehabilitation and Neurology. He became the assistant professor in neurology in 1996 at the Harvard Medical School. The same year, he joined the Beth Israel Deaconess Medical Center as attending neurologist and Youville Hospital as consultant in neurorehabilitation. He set up the Neuroprotection Laboratory at the Harvard Medical School in the Department of Neurology and he joined the Program in Neuroscience as well as the Center for NeuroDiscovery in Neurodegeneration. He taught a course in the New Pathway and a seminar course on Transcriptional Mechanisms of Neuronal Death and Survival in Program in Biological and Biomedical Sciences at Harvard Medical School. He became an associate professor at Harvard Medical School in 1999 and taught there until 2004.

Ratan joined the Burke Neurological Institute in 2003 as its second director He has been on the advisory board of the Dana Brain Health Alliance since 2012.Ratan became a member of the Faculty of 1000, Neurorehabilitation in 2015, and cofounded a novel clinical trials platform called NeuroCuresNY in 2019.

He has been on the editorial board of journals including serving as a Reviewing Editor at The Journal of Neuroscience for 6 years, Senior Associate Editor at Neurotherapeutics, Associate Editor at the Journal of Huntington's disease, and Editorial Boards for Antioxidants and Redox Signaling and Neurobiology of Disease in addition to several other journals.

In 2020, Ratan was elected to the Johns Hopkins Society of Scholars.

== Research and Writing ==
The central focus of the Ratan laboratory's work is to understand adaptive programs that facilitate the brain's ability to combat injury and to foster repair. His studies have tried to explain fundamental mechanisms by which oxidative stress triggers ferroptosis, the inappropriate demise of neurons, and accordingly his molecular and pharmacological studies have had an impact in a number of disease models including stroke, spinal cord injury, traumatic brain injury and Huntington's disease, Parkinson's disease, and Alzheimer's disease. His lab has developed strategies for manipulating reactive oxygen species, specifically peroxide in the nervous system.

In his research, he has worked with undergraduates, graduate students and post-doctoral fellows and has taught a seminar course at Harvard Medical School on the "Transcriptional regulation of survival and death in neurons". His studies have helped identify strategies for limiting neuronal apoptosis and potential markers for antioxidant treatment in the central nervous system.

He co-edited the 1999 book Cell Death and Diseases of the Nervous System and wrote two chapters in it. It was reviewed by Acta Neurologica Belgicathat that wrote "this volume broadly covers the field of neuronal death, and the large number of (mostly) up to date references make this a very useful textbook. Being written and edited by authorities in the field, it can be strongly recommended." In a review of the book, Trends in Neurosciences wrote "overall, this is a sound book with well-recognized authors whose expertise spans the field of neurodegenerative disorders.

In 2004, he co-edited Current Atherosclerosis Reports (Cardiovascular Disease and Stroke) with John Blass and in 2008, he co-edited Mitochondria and Oxidative Stress in Neurodegenerative Disorders with Gary Gibson and Flint Beal.

== Administration, committee work, and meetings ==
In 2003, Ratan was selected among a pool of applicants via a national search to Direct the Burke Medical Research Institute at Weill Cornell Medicine. From 2003-2016, Ratan lead a large-scale recruitment of repair focused scientists at Burke.[14] These recruitments were associated with significant renovation of facilities within the research institute. Accordingly, the focus of research at Burke expanded to include vision recovery, motor recovery, pain and sensory recovery and cognitive recovery and represent one of the largest benches to bedside efforts focused on spinal and brain repair in the world.

Ratan has been the Chair of the Scientific Advisory Board for the Partnership in Stroke Recovery in Canada; he has served on NIH Study Sections; and he Co-Chaired the Gordon Conference on Oxidative Stress in Ventura, California in March 2015. In collaboration with Mark Noble and Marie Filbin, he was principal investigator of an eleven institution Center of Research Excellence in Spinal Cord Injury funded via a $15 million from the New York State Department of Health.

== Awards ==
- NIH-Medical Scientist Training Program Fellow – 1983–88
- The Jay Slotkin Award for Excellence in Research – 1992
- Passano Foundation Clinician Scientist Award – 1994
- The William Randolph Hearst Fund Award – 1996

== Partial Bibliography ==
=== Books ===
- Cell Death and Diseases of the Nervous System. co-editor. (1999)
- Current Atherosclerosis Reports (Cardiovascular disease and stroke) co-editor. (2004)
- Mitochondria and Oxidative Stress in Neurodegenerative Disorders co-editor. (2008)

=== Chapters ===
- Glutathione and the Regulation of Apoptosis in the Nervous System. In: Glutathione in the Nervous System. (1998)
- Antioxidants and the Treatment of Neurological Disease. In: Cell Death and Diseases of the Nervous System. (1998)
- Neurological Evaluation of the Rehabilitation Patient. In: Rehabilitation Secrets. (2007)
- Clinical and Neurobiological Aspects of Stroke Recovery. In: Neurobiology of Disease. (2007)
- Oxidative Damage in Neurodegeneration and Injury. In: Handbook of the Neuroscience of Aging. (2009)
- Cell Death in Spinal Cord Injury: An Evolving Taxonomy with Therapeutic Promise. In: Apoptosis Physiology and Pathology. (2011)
