= Elizabeth A. Hunt =

American pediatric intensivist

Academic background
- Education: BS., 1990, Villanova University; MD, 1995, Albany Medical College; MPH, 2002, PhD, epidemiology, 2008, Johns Hopkins Bloomberg School of Public Health
- Thesis: An evaluation of the quality of resuscitation delivered during simulated pediatric in-hospital cardiopulmonary arrests. (2008)

Elizabeth "Betsy" Anne Hunt is an American pediatric intensivist and critical-care specialist. She is the former David S. and Marilyn M. Zamierowski Director of the Johns Hopkins Medicine Simulation Center.

== Early life and education ==
Hunt earned her Bachelor of Science degree from Villanova University before enrolling at Albany Medical College for her medical degree. As a member of the Alpha Omega Alpha Honor Society, she graduated with her degree in 1995 and enrolled in a combined residency program in Internal Medicine and Pediatrics at Duke University. Following her residency, Hunt joined the Delta Omega Honor Society at the Johns Hopkins Bloomberg School of Public Health where she subsequently earned her Master's degree and PhD in Clinical Epidemiology.

== Career ==
Following her Master's degree in public health, Hunt accepted a faculty position at Johns Hopkins as a pediatric intensivist. She joined the faculty as an assistant professor in their School of Medicine and served as a full-time faculty member and program innovator in the Pediatric Intensive Care Unit (PCIU). In this role, Hunt established the Pediatric CPR Advisory Committee for Johns Hopkins hospital, a committee which meets monthly to discuss defibrillators, drugs, and policies.

Upon earning her appointment, Hunt received the 2004 Helen B. Taussig Research Award for her project "Simulation of Pediatric Cardiopulmonary Arrests: Identification of Errors." The following year, Johns Hopkins was awarded $4 million to fund a Simulation Center, which Hunt would lead. Upon its completion in 2006, she was appointed the David S. and Marilyn M. Zamierowski Director of the Johns Hopkins Medicine Simulation Center. In this role, she led a study that found emergency room staff were ill-equipped to deal with child resuscitation unless they practiced the skill. Based on this study, she founded the United States first pediatric rapid response team and co-founded the International Network for Simulation-based Pediatric Innovation, Research and Education (INSPIRE). As the leader of Johns Hopkins rapid response team, Hunt concluded that since the inception of the team there was a large reduction in respiratory arrests. By May 2008, Hunt was named one of Maryland's Top 100 Women by the Daily Record.

In 2013, Hunt was promoted to associate professor and founded a program called “Code Busters” with the goal of improving both CPR quality and teamwork at Johns Hopkins. By 2019, she was promoted to the rank of full professor.
