= Janet Gilsdorf =

American scientist and writer

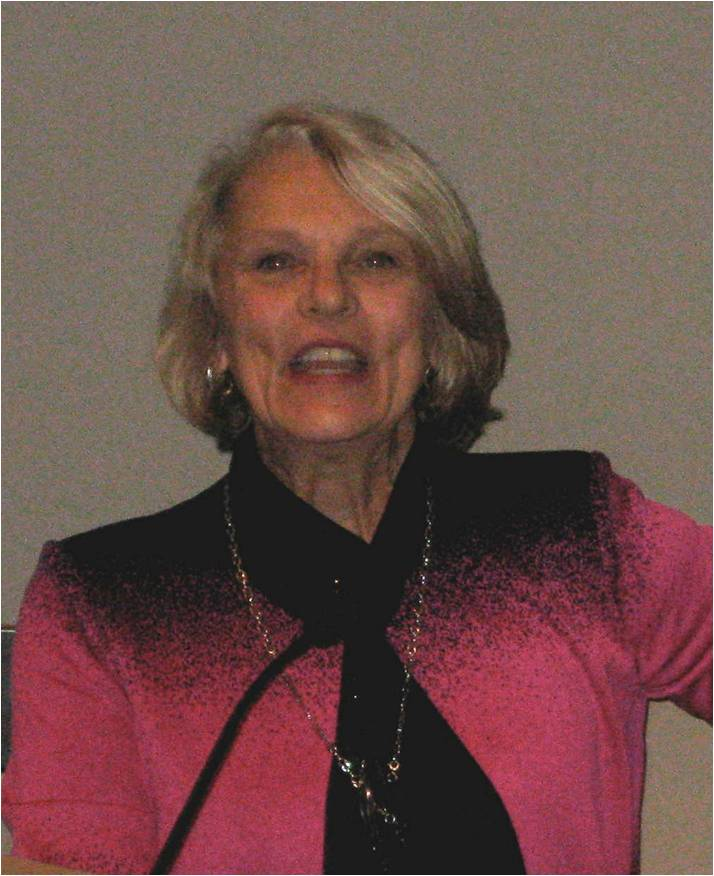
- Education: North Dakota State University; University of North Dakota School of Medicine; University of Nebraska College of Medicine
- Known for: Research on Haemophilus influenzae epidemiology, pathogenicity, and molecular genetics
- Notable work: Inside/Outside (2006); Ten Days (2011); Continual Raving (2019); Fever (2022)
- Awards: Sarah Goddard Power Award (2004); Distinguished Physician Award, Pediatric Infectious Diseases Society (2012); Doctor of Science Honorary Degree, University of Nebraska–Lincoln (2015)
- Scientific career
- Fields: Pediatric infectious diseases; Microbiology; Epidemiology
- Workplaces: University of Michigan
- Academic advisors: Patricia Ferrieri

Janet Gilsdorf is an American pediatric infectious diseases physician, scientist, and writer at the University of Michigan. Her research has focused on the pathogenic, molecular, and epidemiologic features of the bacterium Haemophilus influenzae. She served as the Director of the Division of Pediatric Infectious Diseases in the University of Michigan Health System from 1989 to 2012 and Co-Director of the Center for Molecular and Clinical Epidemiology of Infectious Diseases at the School of Public Health at the University of Michigan from 2000 – 2015. In addition to her scientific publications, she is also the author of two novels, one memoir, one non-fiction book, and a number of medically oriented essays.

== Early life and education ==
Gilsdorf attended North Dakota State University and the University of North Dakota School of Medicine and received her Doctor of Medicine degree from the University of Nebraska College of Medicine. She trained in pediatrics at Baylor Affiliated Hospitals in Houston, Texas, and at Valley Medical Center in Fresno, California. She completed a pediatric infectious diseases fellowship at the University of Minnesota, under the mentorship of Patricia Ferrieri.

== Research ==
Gilsdorf's research focused primarily on increasing our understanding of the epidemiology, molecular genetics, and pathogenicity of the bacterium Haemophilus influenzae, which causes both middle ear infections and severe systemic infections including meningitis in children.

=== Bacterial meningitis in Native Alaskan children ===
While working at the Yukon-Kuskokwim Health Corporation in Bethel, Alaska, Gilsdorf documented the high rate of H. influenzae meningitis in children diagnosed at the Alaska Native Health Service Hospital. This observation led to clinical trials of H. influenzae type b vaccines in native Alaskan children, who exhibited a rate of infection ten to fifteen times higher than that reported in studies from the continental United States.

=== Colonization of H. influenzae in children attending day care ===
While a pediatric resident in Fresno California, Gilsdorf worked with Dr. Dan M. Granoff, to investigate spread of Haemophilus influenzae type b (Hib) in children attending child day care. They showed that healthy children attending a day care center in which a child had experienced a serious Hib infection often carried that bacterium in their noses and/or throats without developing serious disease. Gilsdorf and her coauthors also demonstrated the ability of the antibiotic rifampin to decrease H. influenzae carriage. These studies led to the recommendation to treat household and day care center contacts with rifampin to eliminate H. influenzae carriage and thus decrease the risk of infection.

=== Adherence of H. influenzae to human epithelial cells ===
After demonstrating that H. influenzae adhere to human epithelial cells, Gilsdorf and her collaborators showed that the adherence was mediated by surface proteins called pili and described the components of those structures.

=== Genetic diversity of H. influenzae ===
Gilsdorf and her colleagues demonstrated the high level of genetic diversity among colonizing strains of H. influenzae, which led to their description of the H. influenzae strain dynamics during pharyngeal colonization.

=== Identification of genetic differences between pathogenic and non-pathogenic H. influenzae ===
Gilsdorf and her associates described genetic differences between disease-causing and colonizing H. influenzae strains, suggesting that the genes more prevalent among disease-causing strains represent bacterial factors that may contribute to H. influenzae pathogenicity and disease.

=== Genetic technique to distinguish encapsulated from non-encapsulated H. influenzae ===
Gilsdorf and her colleagues described a molecular typing method that utilized identification of a key capsule gene among H. influenzae strains. This new technique, identifying bexB in clinical isolates, is now used by the Centers for Disease Control to type H. influenzae.

== Literary works ==
=== Non-fiction ===
- Inside/Outside: A Physician’s Journey with Breast Cancer (2006)
- Continual Raving: A History of Meningitis and the People who Conquered It (2019)

=== Fiction ===
- Ten Days (2011)
- Fever (2022)
- Seasons of Light and Dark (2026)

== Personal life ==
Gilsdorf lives in Ann Arbor, Michigan, with her husband Jim. She has two adult sons. She documented her experience with cancer in her memoir Inside/Outside: A Physician’s Journey with Breast Cancer.

== Recognition ==
- Alpha Omega Alpha faculty inductee (1999)
- Sarah Goddard Power Award, University of Michigan (2004)
- Alumni Achievement Award, North Dakota State University (2008)
- Robert P. Kelch MD Research Professor of Pediatrics Chair, University of Michigan (2010)
- League of Research Excellence inductee, University of Michigan Medical School (2011)
- Distinguished Physician Award, Pediatric Infectious Diseases Society (2012)
- Doctor of Science Honorary Degree, University of Nebraska College of Medicine (2015)

== Professional service ==
- Member, Advisory Committee on Immunization Practices (ACIP), Centers for Disease Control and Prevention, 2003 to 2007
- President, the Pediatric Infectious Diseases Society, 2015 to 2017
- Board of Directors, Infectious Diseases Society of America, 2005-2008
- Board of Scientific Counselors, National Institutes of Health Clinical Center, 2007-2011
- Board of Directors, Cancer Support Community of Ann Arbor, 2022-present
