= Anthony Zacchei =

American ophthalmologist

Anthony C. Zacchei
- Born: United States
- Education: Jefferson Medical College
- Medical career
- Profession: Ophthalmologist
- Sub-specialties: Cataracts, Glaucoma, LASIK

Anthony C. Zacchei is an American ophthalmologist, an author of numerous publications and a member of such academies as the American Academy of Ophthalmology, the American Medical Association and the Pennsylvania Medical Society.

== Career ==
Zacchei graduated from the Jefferson Medical College magna cum laude. After that, he received training at the Emory University of Atlanta, Georgia. Later, he joined the Bascom Palmer Eye Institute in Miami and became Director of glaucoma and Director of Cataract Surgery at the Moore Eye Institute which was a part of the Mercy System and the Crozer-Keystone Health System. He is a founding surgeon of Kremer Eye Center in Philadelphia, Pennsylvania. He also received memberships as an honorable member of Alpha Omega Alpha and performed over 50,000 Lasik surgeries and cataract surgeries.
