= Kimberly D. Manning =

American physician

- Born: Los Angeles, California, U.S.
- Education: Tuskegee University; Meharry Medical College; Case Western Reserve University
- Known for: Reflections of a Grady Doctor - Blog
- Awards: 2019 Lifetime Achievement Award from the Association of Black Women Physicians, 2018 ACGME Courage to Teach Award, 2011 Evangeline Papageorge Distinguished Teaching Award
- Scientific career
- Fields: Internal Medicine and Pediatrics
- Workplaces: Emory University School of Medicine

Kimberly Dyan Manning is an American physician. She currently serves as a Professor of Medicine as well as the Associate Chair of Diversity, Equity, and Inclusion for the Department of Medicine at Emory University School of Medicine in Atlanta, Georgia. Manning has been recognized at the national level for her mentorship and teaching as well as her blogging and public speaking. She is the winner of the ACGME Parker J. Palmer Courage To Teach Award, the Evangeline Papageorge Award, and her blog “Reflections of a Grady Doctor” was named as one of the top four medical blogs by “O” The Oprah Magazine.

== Early life and education ==
Manning was born in California and grew up in inner city Los Angeles. In high school, Manning's father told her that, as a Black man in Alabama, people warned him that becoming a physician was not attainable. Hearing this story from her father motivated her to pursue a career in medicine.

Following high school, Manning attended Tuskegee University in Alabama, a Historically Black College/University (HBCU) for her undergraduate education. Manning completed her pre-medical studies, and is a part of the Delta Sigma Theta sorority. After completing her pre-medical studies in 1992, Manning was still set on a path to a career in medicine. She pursued her medical degree training at Meharry Medical College, also an HBCU.

Upon completion of her M.D. in 1996, Manning attended one of Case Western's affiliates, MetroHealth, for her residency training. She completed a combined internal medicine and pediatrics residency. In 2000, she was Chief Resident at Case Western Reserve University/MetroHealth and was selected by her classmates for an honorary membership in the Alpha Omega Alpha honor society.

== Career ==
In 2001, Manning joined the Emory University School of Medicine faculty as a professor in the Department of Medicine. She has since become an Associate Professor of Medicine as well as the Associate Vice Chair of Diversity, Equity, and Inclusion in the Department of Medicine at Emory University School of Medicine. Her leadership led to the development of the strategic plan for Diversity, Equity, and Inclusion at Emory University School of Medicine. She also led the Emory University Task force on Diversity, Equity, and Inclusion and has been a critical mentor and advocate for underrepresented minorities in medicine throughout her time at Emory.

In addition to the roles she plays in enhancing diversity and equity at Emory, she is also a prominent educator, and is known nationally for her teaching at both the level of medical students as well as residents. She was one of the 16 faculty chosen to lead the new medical school curriculum, started in 2007. She also serves as the director for the Transitional Year Residency Program at Emory where she provides a clinical base to students that match into Emory's residency program. At the medical school level, Manning is an advisor for the Semmelweiss Society where she mentors and supports a small group of medical students throughout their time at Emory Medical School. She has been an advisor in this role since 2007.

In addition to roles in promoting diversity and educating both pre-clinical students and residents, Manning also treats patients at Grady Memorial Hospital, one of the largest public hospitals in the United States.

=== Writing ===
Manning preaches humanism in medicine and teaches how reflective writing can be used consecutively for personal mental health and community building. She embodies both of her educational lessons by writing the blog “Reflections of a Grady Doctor” to describe her personal experience in the medical field as a physician and educator at the Grady Memorial Hospital in Atlanta, Georgia. Her blog was recognized by Oprah.com as one of the best Doctor's Blogs in 2010. The practice of writing often, Grady calls “habitual reflection” and she teaches that it is vital in the practice of becoming a good doctor.

As a Fellow of the American College of Physicians, Manning is also a weekly writer for the American College of Physicians Hospitalist Blog, sharing narratives of medical experiences on the wards and educating readers on key topics in medicine such as owning medical mistakes, imposter syndrome, and physician burnout.

In addition to her blogging, Manning writes for several top tier journals and publishers including the Journal of the American Medical Association, the Annals of Internal Medicine, and Academic Medicine. She has also played a key role in writing the McGraw-Hill educational textbooks for teaching the Principals and Practice of Hospital Medicine.

== Awards and honors ==
- 2019 Master Clinician Visiting Professor at University of California, San Francisco
- 2019 Lifetime Achievement Award from the Association of Black Women Physicians
- 2018 ACGME Courage to Teach Award
- 2016 Best Conference Faculty Teaching Award
- 2013 Juha P. Kokko Teaching Award
- 2011-2014 Voted “Best Attending” by the School of Medicine Graduating Class
- 2011 Evangeline Papageorge Distinguished Teaching Award - Highest Honor in teaching that the School of Medicine Bestows
- 2011 Juha P. Kokko Teaching Award for best overall teacher
- Three time Golden Apple Teaching Award Winner of Emory University School of Medicine
- 2000 Honorary Membership in the Alpha Omega Alpha Honor Medical Society

== Select media ==
- Blog - “Reflections of a Grady Doctor”, named in 2010 by The Oprah Magazine as one of 4 medical blogs you should read.
- #50 Virtual Morning Report with the Clinical Problem Solvers Podcast
- The Curbsiders Podcast - Hotcakes: Imposter syndrome 2019
- Fox5 - The Importance of Vitamin D in 2018
- CNN - Discussing health concerns after the earthquake and tsunami in Japan
- WebMD Biography and Parenting
- Dr. Oz :”Top three reasons you dislike your doctor”

== Select publications ==
- Manning KD. Black Women in Medicine—A Documentary. JAMA. 2017;318(14):1306–1307. doi:10.1001/jama.2017.11551
- Manning KD. Professionalism in Hospital Medicine. In: Principles and Practice of Hospital Medicine. McKean S, Ross J, Dressler D, Ginsberg J, Brotman D eds. McGraw-Hill, 2015
- Manning KD. The Death of a Clinician-Educator. In: On Being a Doctor Volume 4, Laine C, LaCombe M eds. American College of Physicians. 2014
- Manning KD, Winawer N, Murali M. Allergy and Anaphylaxis. In: Principles and Practice of Hospital Medicine. McKean S, Ross J, Dressler D, Ginsberg J, Brotman D eds. McGraw-Hill, 2012
- DeFilippis AP, Tellez I, Winawer NH, Di Francesco L, Manning KD, Kripalani S. (2010) On-site Night Float by Attending Physicians: A Model to Improve Resident Education and Patient Care. Journal of Graduate Medical Education: Vol. 2, No. 1, pp. 57–61
- Manning KD, Kripalani S. The use of standardized patients to teach low-literacy communication skills. American Journal of Health Behavior, 2007; 31 (Suppl) S105 – S110
- Kripalani S, Jacobson KL, Brown S, Manning KD, Rask KJ, Jacobson TA. Development and implementation of a health literacy training program for medical residents. Medical Education Online 2006;11 (13):1-8
