= Paul Alan Wetter =

American surgeon

Paul Alan Wetter is an American medical doctor, surgeon and innovator, noted for significant advances in minimally invasive and robotic surgery. Wetter is the founder and chairman emeritus of the Society of Laparoscopic and Robotic Surgeons.

== Education ==
Wetter received his B.S. from the University of Miami and Medical Degrees from the University of Miami School of Medicine. Wetter is a Clinical Professor Emeritus at the University of Miami's Miller School of Medicine.

== Career ==
Wetter performed some of the first laparoscopic pelviscopy procedures in North America. Wetter founded the Society of Laparoscopic and Robotic Surgeons.

== Positions ==
- Chairman, Society of Laparoscopic and Robotic Surgeons(formerly Society of Laparoendoscopic Surgeons)
- Managing Editor, Journal Society of Laparoscopic and Robotic Surgeons
- Senior Advisor, International Society for Medial innovation and Technology
- Editorial Advisory Board, General Surgery News
- Executive Editor, Prevention and Management of Laparoendoscopic Complications, Medical Textbook, Four Editions
