= List of Delta Omega members =

Delta Omega is an international honorary society for studies in public health. It was founded in 1924 at the Bloomberg School of Public Health at Johns Hopkins University in Baltimore, Maryland. The society has regular and honorary members. Regular members include students, faculty, and alumni of institutions with chapters. Honorary members are inducted by the national officers. Following are some of Delta Omega's notable members.

== Regular members ==
Nation	Chapter and initiation date	Notability	Ref.
Mary Amdur	Beta, 1953	Toxicologist and public health researcher who worked primarily on pollution	
Haroutune Armenian	Alpha, 1985	President of the American University of Armenia	
Timothy D. Baker	Alpha, 1975	Professor of international health at the Johns Hopkins Bloomberg School of Public Health	
Trevor Beard	Zeta	medical doctor, best known for his work in the 1960s to eradicate echinococcosis	
Bertha C. Boschulte	Delta, 1951	General Services Director of the Department of Health, Danish Virgin Islands	
Jane A. Cauley	Omicron, 1990	Professor in the Department of Epidemiology and an associate dean for research at the University of Pittsburgh	
David Celentano	Alpha, 1995	Chair of the Department of Epidemiology at the Johns Hopkins Bloomberg School of Public Health	
Raphael E. Cuomo	Sigma, 2014	Biomedical scientist and associate professor at the University of California, San Diego	
Barbara Curbow	Alpha, 1998	Professor and chair of the Department of Behavioral and Community Health at the University of Maryland	
Andrew Paul Feinberg	Alpha, 1981	Director of the center for Epigenetics and professor in the Johns Hopkins School of Medicine	
Ralph R. Frerichs	1970	professor emeritus of epidemiology at the University of California, Los Angeles	
Stephen Gange	Alpha, 2002	professor of epidemiology at the Johns Hopkins Bloomberg School of Public Health and the Johns Hopkins School of Medicine	
Carol Garrison	Theta	President of the University of Alabama at Birmingham	
Helene D. Gayle	Alpha, 1999	President of Spelman College and CEO of the Chicago Community Trust	
Maura L. Gillison	Alpha, 2001	medical oncologist and molecular epidemiologist credited with establishing a connection between HPV and oral cancer	
Sherita Hill Golden	Alpha, 2000	Professor of endocrinology and metabolism at Johns Hopkins University	
Céline Gounder	Alpha, 2000	Physician and medical journalist who specializes in infectious diseases and global health	
Irva Hertz-Picciotto	Theta, 1998	professor and chief of the Division of Environmental and Occupational Health at the University of California, Davis	
Edgar Erskine Hume	Alpha	Physician and major general in the United States Army Medical Corps	
Elizabeth A. Hunt	Alpha, 2002	Pediatric intensivist, critical-care specialist, and director of the Johns Hopkins Medicine Simulation Center	
Adnan Hyder	Alpha, 1998	Professor of global health at the George Washington University Milken Institute School of Public Health	
Ji Jiafu	Alpha, 2022	Surgical oncologist and professor in gastrointestinal surgery at Peking University	
Renee M. Johnson	Theta, 2005	Associate professor at the Johns Hopkins Bloomberg School of Public Health	
Kami Kandola	Alpha, 1997	Chief Medical Officer for the Northwest Territories, Canada	
Brian King	Gamma Lambda, 2014	Director of the Food and Drug Administration's Center for Tobacco Products	
Thomas D. Kirsch	Alpha, 2006	professor at the Johns Hopkins School of Medicine, Johns Hopkins Bloomberg School of Public Health, and Whiting School of Engineering	
Shiriki Kumanyika	Alpha, 1984	Emeritus Professor of biostatistics and epidemiology at the Perelman School of Medicine	
Lisa Morrissey LaVange	Theta, 1998	Professor and chair of the Department of Biostatistics in the UNC Gillings School of Global Public Health	
Ruth Link-Gelles	Theta, 2016	Epidemiologist with the Centers for Disease Control and Prevention and a commander in the United States Public Health Service Commissioned Corps.	
Beaufort Longest	Omicron, 1995	Professor emeritus of health policy and management at the University of Pittsburgh	
Marie McCormick	Alpha, 1995	Pediatrician and professor at Harvard T.H. Chan School of Public Health	
Anne B. Newman	Omicron, 2005	Chair of population health science at the University of Pittsburgh	
Adeiyewunmi Osinubi	Tau, 2014	Documentary filmmaker and an emergency medicine resident physician at the University of Pennsylvania School of Medicine	
Jonas Salk	Delta, 1947	Virologist and medical researcher who invented the polio vaccine	
Dale Sandler	Alpha, 2012	Chief of the epidemiology branch at the National Institute of Environmental Health Sciences	
Moyses Szklo	Alpha, 1980	Professor of epidemiology and medicine at the Johns Hopkins University and editor-in-chief emeritus of the American Journal of Epidemiology	
Daniel Webster	Alpha, 2005	Health policy researcher at the Center for Gun Policy and Research	
Paul Whelton	Alpha	Physician and scientist who has contributed to the fields of hypertension and kidney disease epidemiology	
Calvin Zippin	Zeta, 1954	Professor Emeritus in the Department of Epidemiology and Biostatistics at the UCSF School of Medicine	

== Honorary members ==
Nation	Chapter and initiation date	Notability	Ref.
Sara Josephine Baker	Honorary, 1924	Physician who contributed to public health, especially in the immigrant communities of New York City	
John M. Barry	Honorary, 2009	author and professor at the Tulane University School of Public Health and Tropical Medicine	
Regina Benjamin	Honorary, 2011	Surgeon General of the United States	
Peter Buxtun	Honorary, 2019	Epidemiologist with the United States Public Health Service who exposed Tuskegee Syphilis Experiment	
Charles V. Chapin	Honorary, 1927	Superintendent of health for Providence, Rhode Island; professor at Brown University; and public health researcher	
Mandy Cohen	Honorary, 2024	Director of the U.S. Centers for Disease Control and Prevention	
Hugh S. Cumming	Honorary, 1929	Surgeon General of the United States	
Barbara Ann DeBuono	Honorary, 2008	New York State Commissioner of Health and professional lecturer at the George Washington University Milken Institute School of Public Health	
Anthony Fauci	Honorary, 2022	Director of the National Institute of Allergy and Infectious Diseases and the chief medical advisor to the president	
Kristine Gebbie	Honorary, 2010	public health official and professor at the Flinders University School of Nursing & Midwifery	
Mona Hanna	Honorary, 2018	Pediatrician, professor, and public health advocate who exposed Flint water crisis	
Herbert Hoover	Honorary, 1929	President of the United States	
Wilson Jameson	Honorary	medical doctor and the ninth Chief Medical Officer of England	
George Walter McCoy	Honorary, 1930	medical doctor, international expert on leprosy, and director of the National Institute of Health	
Vivek Murthy	Honorary, 2023	Vice admiral in the United States Public Health Service Commissioned Corps and 19th and 21st surgeon general of the United States	
Arthur Newsholme	Honorary, 1924	public health expert who promoted local health programs and the national health insurance in while the Medical Officer with the national Local Government Board for England and Wales	
William Hallock Park	Honorary	bacteriologist and laboratory director at the New York City Board of Health, Division of Pathology, Bacteriology, and Disinfection	
Thomas Parran	Honorary, 1938	Surgeon General of the United States who oversaw the notorious Tuskegee syphilis experiment and Guatemala syphilis experiment	
John Edward Porter	Honorary, 2000	United States House of Representatives	
Watson Smith Rankin	Honorary, 1924	Dean of the School of Medicine at Wake Forest College and North Carolina's first full-time state health officer	
Mazÿck P. Ravenel	Honorary, 1931	Professor of preventive medicine at the University of Missouri and president of the American Public Health Association	
Frederick F. Russell	Honorary, 1929	Brigadier General in the U.S. Army, physician, and virologist who perfected a typhoid vaccine	
David Satcher	Honorary, 1998	Surgeon General of the United States	
Bryan Stevenson	Honorary, 2021	Social justice activist, professor at New York University School of Law, and the founder and executive director of the Equal Justice Initiative	
Shannon Watts	Honorary, 2019	Gun safety activist	
Gretchen Whitmer	Honorary, 2020	Governor of Michigan	
