= Cure Violence =

Credible messenger anti-violence program

Cure Violence Global
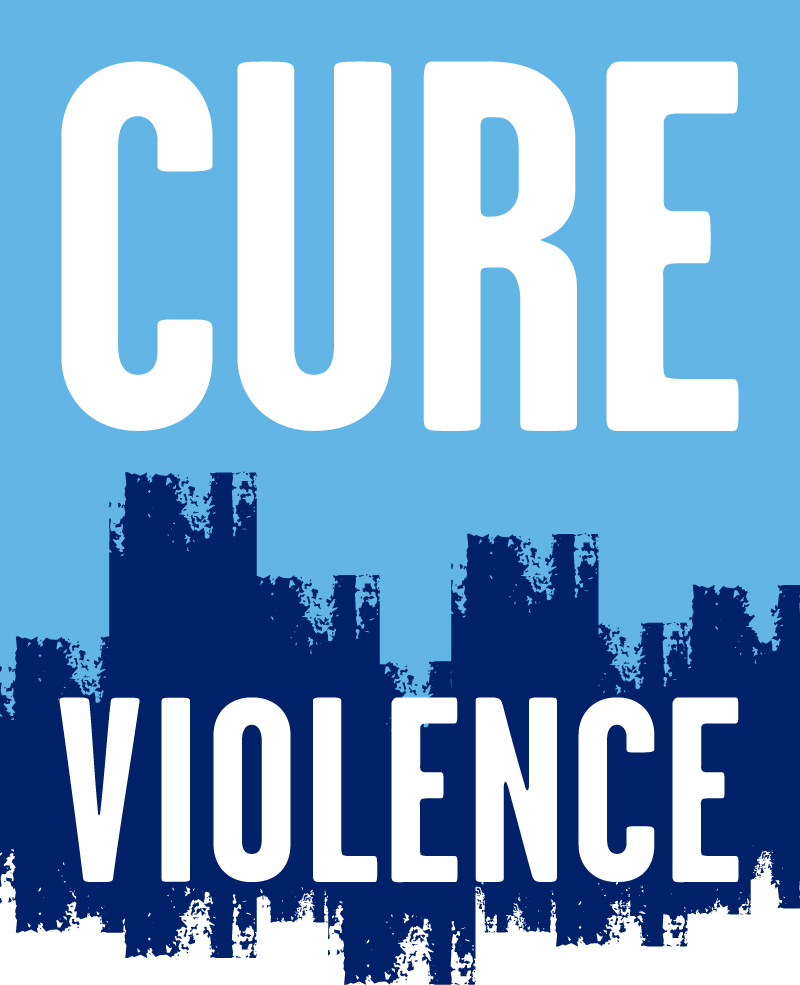
- Predecessor: CeaseFire Chicago
- Founded: 2000
- Founder: Gary Slutkin
- Type: NGO
- Purpose: To reduce violence globally using disease control and behavior change methods
- Headquarters: Chicago, Illinois
- Location: Global
- Region served: US/international
- Method: Violence interruption; Outreach work; Community building
- Executive Director: Monique Williams, PhD
- Key people: Brent Decker, chief program officer; Charles Ransford, director of science and policy
- Website: cvg.org

Cure Violence is a public health approach to violence prevention and reduction. It aims to stop the spread of violence in communities by using the methods and strategies associated with epidemic disease control: detecting and interrupting conflicts, identifying and treating the highest risk individuals, and changing social norms.

== History ==
Cure Violence has its roots in a 1999 organizing effort which included religious leaders, law enforcement officials, and academics. In particular, epidemiologist Gary Slutkin, who was directing the Chicago Project for Violence Prevention at the University of Illinois, promoted a plan to prevent violence based on the previously successful Operation Ceasefire. Cardinal Francis George and Police Superintendent Terry Hillard supported the effort and a formed a formal coalition at the end of that year. In early 2000, they took their first major public action by setting up cease-fire zones throughout the city. Within these zones, participants agreed to a rapid response to shooting incidents to spread grassroots messages against gun violence, in addition to the traditional law enforcement investigation. Soon thereafter they took on the name CeaseFire Chicago.

The program grew over the next 7 years. They received funding from a variety of sources including the government, private foundations, and community foundations. They originally restricted their work to specific high-risk Chicago neighborhoods which contained pre-existing activist communities, but expanded to other neighborhoods starting in 2003. Local police facilitated their work by giving them access to data such as crime trends in weekly meetings. In the following year, Illinois quintupled their funding for the organization, facilitating work in five Illinois cities (including Chicago). Then-First Lady Laura Bush visited CeaseFire headquarters in 2005 and praised their achievements. In 2006, a state grant helped the organization spread to Decatur. They worked with local community members and planned their work through four lenses: monthly planning, policy establishment and client advocacy, promotional activities, and coordination with religious leaders. In 2007, a similar program was started in Kansas City with training from CeaseFire workers. In the same year Baltimore also started a program which was said to be inspired by CeaseFire.

CeaseFire was reorganized and changed its name to Cure Violence in September 2012. Cure Violence now refers to the larger organization and overall health approach, while local program partner sites often operate under other names. In December 2015, Cure Violence has 23 cities implementing the Cure Violence health approach in over 50 sites in the U.S. International program partner sites are operating in Trinidad, Honduras, Mexico, South Africa, Canada and Colombia.

== Model ==
Cure Violence, as the name implies, draws an analogy between the way diseases are transmitted between individuals and the way that violence spreads through communities. Their work can be compared to the work that antibiotics or vaccinations do in preventing a disease from damaging its host and spreading to others. As Gary Slutkin (the founder of Cure Violence) told the Chicago Tribune,

Violence follows usual epidemiological patterns, when you look at charts, graphs and maps, it follows exactly like all epidemics. You can think of an epidemic of a flu or tuberculosis, where there are very few cases, then there are more and more. Violence has a contagious nature. The requirement for intervention becomes obvious, you have to interact with the people who have been infected.

Cure Violence identifies metaphorically infected individuals by assessing whether they meet certain conditions, such as being a prominent member of a gang or being a recent victim of violence. If a worker suspects that their client is going to commit violence soon, they will try to talk them out of it in a practice known as violence interruption. Additionally, they will keep in touch with their clients in order to gather information and help guide them towards more constructive activities, referred to as outreach work. Finally, the organization as a whole uses community and group norm change to build a strong culture of anti-violence. (Note: The below sections vary considerably in size; this is based on the topics that the available sources (mostly media outlets) tend to focus on and is not necessarily representative of the proportion of the organization's resources that are directed to each category. No source in this article provides information about resource allocation by activity.)

=== Violence interruption ===
Violence interruption is an immediate response to imminent violence; people who perform this work are referred to as interrupters. They work with their clients to find peaceful alternatives to potentially violent situations. The way they approach this is personalized to the client and the situation. For example, if they are facing cyclical gang violence then the worker might talk to their client about the perpetual harm this causes and attempt to broker peace through talks.

In either case, Cure Violence emphasizes that the interrupter should be seen as a credible messenger by the client. In the case of cyclical gang violence, they employ workers with a history of violence, with an emphasis on former gang members, so that they can genuinely relate to the clients they work with. In either case, they avoid acting as informants or agents of law enforcement, as they claim that this would undermine the goal of being a credible messenger. They also try to employ interrupters who live in the area that they work in order to facilitate organic information gathering and obtain a natural path for approaching potential clients.

Workers will also sometimes reach out to potential victims in order to give them advice on how to stay safe and connect them with third-party resources that specialize in helping victims.

Some people are critical of the violence interruption approach due to the way that it medicalizes the problem. Malte Riemann, a professor of international relations, cautioned that the model displays a neoliberal logic that runs the risk of 'replacing political solutions with medical diagnosis and treatment models'. This has depoliticizing effects as 'violence becomes disentangled from socio-economic inequalities and explained by reference to individual pathology alone'. The possible limitations of the model's extension to conflict resolution have also been discussed, especially the 'risk of undermining the establishment of positive peace in a post-conflict environment'. A similar sentiment was expressed by the director of Aim4Peace, an implementing site in Kansas City. She noted that preventing violence on a case-by-case basis could only go so far, and creating a culture of peace requires building positive lifestyles.

Some people, particularly law enforcement officials, criticize the credible messenger aspect because it means that the people employed by Cure Violence are frequently convicted offenders. Preceding a collaborative agreement between Cure Violence and the Chicago Police Department, then-superintendent Garry McCarthy told WBEZ that he disliked their methods because Cure Violence workers "tell people, 'Well, don't talk to the police. We understand you can't trust the police, but look at us, you can trust us'—they're undercutting that legitimacy that we're trying to create in the community". The executive director of Cure Violence, Tio Hardiman, responded to this by stating that their workers do not actively discourage people from reporting or otherwise cooperating with police. However, he did acknowledge that some tension exists when he told WBEZ that "[I]f the young guys that we work with feel that we're ... being informants, or whatever, there's a chance some of our staff will lose their lives."

=== Outreach work ===
Outreach workers (who are often the same people as interrupters) help clients find jobs, educational opportunities, or social services. When working with gang members who typically restrict themselves to a certain territory, outreach workers will invite them to events outside of their territory in order to expand their horizons. Workers also help clients avoid parole violations; additionally, workers advocate for leniency in sentencing if the client has been actively engaged with the outreach worker.

=== Community and group norm change ===
Cure Violence organizes community activities and distributes educational material, which they claim shifts the norms towards non-violence. After a public shooting, they might organize a march against violence or a vigil for the deceased. When relevant, they might invite the people they are working with to the vigils under the belief that witnessing the effects of shootings will make them less likely to commit violence in the future. Additionally, when the clients are people who are connected to a recent victim, workers believe that attending a respectful funeral can give their clients a healthy outlet for their grief, distracting them from thoughts of revenge.

Community norm change can go beyond publicly visible events. In Baltimore, workers claim to have negotiated a long-lasting peace treaty between rival groups. Additionally, they persuaded gang members to avoid wearing flags advertising their gang affiliations. Their goal is to build a culture of non-violence even within organizations that are otherwise engaged in criminal activity.

== Funding ==
Cure Violence has received funding from the Robert Wood Johnson Foundation, the MacArthur Foundation, and the United States Department of Justice. (Note: This list is not exhaustive.)

=== 2007–2008 Illinois budget cuts and restoration ===
Funding for CeaseFire Chicago was uncertain in the beginning of 2007. Governor Blagojevich proposed a budget which did not include specific funding for CeaseFire. Some proponents believed this would not be an issue, as funding had historically been allocated by the legislature rather than the executive. However, when the legislature tried to allocate specific funding to the organization it was vetoed by the Governor. There was an effort to override the veto but it ultimately failed. This led to CeaseFire operations shutting down in some areas such as Decatur. Other cities were able to sustain their programs through other sources. For example, CeaseFire received $400,000 of grant money from Cicero and basketball star Dwyane Wade included CeaseFire in the list of organizations to benefit from his "Young, Fly, and Flashy" fundraising events.

In June 2008 the state legislature approved a budget with an additional $6.25 million for CeaseFire, but the governor indicated that he was still opposed to the funding and eventually vetoed it. After the governor was removed from office due to unrelated corruption charges (Note: see Rod Blagojevich corruption charges,) the legislature restored funding. The renewed funding allowed CeaseFire to resume operation in Decatur.

=== 2012 health department grant with police oversight ===
In 2012, the Chicago Department of Health granted CeaseFire $1 million with a stipulation that their results are monitored by the Chicago Police Department. The grant was intended to fund an expansion to two Chicago neighborhoods which had high levels of violence, and the police used their CompStat system to monitor results.

There were tensions between CeaseFire and the police from the beginning. The Fraternal Order of Police criticized the move, stating that the money should have been invested into the police department directly instead of a partner organization. Additionally, then-Police Superintendent Garry McCarthy criticized CeaseFire for working with convicted felons and claimed that CeaseFire undermines the police's effort to build trust with communities. On the other hand, CeaseFire workers required a guarantee that the police would not expect them to become informants.

In July 2012, CeaseFire intervened to prevent retaliation for the shooting of Tishona Turner and Nakia Polk. This was reported as the first major incident under this grant, although the shooting did not take place in either of the new districts. CeaseFire intervened after Jermaine Louis' family asked them to help; they claimed that he was in danger of retaliatory violence and were not able to protect him (he was also considered a person of interest by the police). CeaseFire convinced him to cooperate with the police, which required undergoing questioning but not admitting guilt and allowed him to stay in a safe house.

A year after the program started, CeaseFire workers claimed that when officers moved pedestrians off of gang-controlled streets, they also demanded that the CeaseFire workers move, preventing them from identifying and preventing imminent conflicts in the areas where they were most likely to occur. The city did not extend funding beyond the original one-year timeline.

== Evaluation ==
=== Evidence ===
In May 2008, Professor Wesley G. Skogan, an expert on crime and policing at Northwestern University, completed a three-year, independent, Department of Justice-funded report on CeaseFire, which found that the program successfully reduced shootings and killings by 41% to 73%. Shootings were reduced by up to 28% in four of the seven communities examined in the report.

A three-year evaluation of the Chicago implementation by the U.S. Department of Justice in 2009 found shootings and killings were reduced by 41 percent to 73 percent, shooting hot spots were reduced in size and intensity, and retaliatory murders were eliminated. "A striking finding was how important CeaseFire loomed in their lives", the researchers stated in the report. "Clients noted the importance of being able to reach their outreach worker at critical moments—when they were tempted to resume taking drugs, were involved in illegal activities, or when they felt that violence was imminent." The lead evaluator commented that, "I found the statistical results to be as strong as you could hope for."

In an independent evaluation of the Cure Violence model at the Baltimore partner program site commissioned by the Centers for Disease Control and conducted by Johns Hopkins University, Baltimore's Safe Streets program, the Cure Violence partner site, is credited with reducing shootings and killings by up to 34–56%. Community norm changes occurred, even with non-clients and reductions spread to surrounding communities.

In 2010, the United States Department of Justice contracted with the Center for Court Innovation to evaluate the Cure Violence New York City program partner site, and found the gun violence rate in the program site to be 20% lower than what it would have been had its change mirrored the average change in comparison precincts.

The John Jay College of Criminal Justice was contracted by several funders to conduct an extensive, independent evaluation on the Cure Violence approach in New York City, which found a reduction in violence, a shift in norms, and an improvement in police-community relations. The evaluation found a 37% to 50% reduction in gun injuries in the two communities examined. Additionally, the study found a 14% reduction in attitudes supporting violence (with no change in controls) and an increased confidence in police and increased willingness to contact police. A 2015 report found that the average homicide rate in NYC program neighborhoods fell by 18% while increasing an average 69% in comparison neighborhoods.

An evaluation of the program in Port of Spain, Trinidad, conducted by Arizona State University and funded by the Inter-American Development Bank found a 45% reduction in violent crime in the service area.

=== Notable endorsements ===
The Chicago Tribune has published multiple editorials expressing support for the program.

In 2005, then-First Lady Laura Bush visited CeaseFire headquarters in Chicago and praised their achievements.

Daniel Webster, co-director of the Johns Hopkins Center for Gun Policy and Research, advocates for CeaseFire's approach to violent crime, believing the benefits of intercession are many. On CNN.com, Webster said, "Violence is reciprocal. Stopping one homicide through mediation could buy you peace for months down the road."

In 2021, Cure Violence was listed as the 9th top NGO by NGO Advisor (now thedotgood) in its "Top 20 NGO's World" list.

In 2021, the National Gang Center graded Cure Violence model as promising.

== Partners ==
=== National sites ===
- Baltimore Safe Streets in Baltimore, Maryland
- Aim 4 Peace in Kansas City, Missouri
- Cure for Camden, Camden, New Jersey (inactive)
- CeaseFire Illinois, Chicago (inactive)
- CeaseFire New Orleans, Louisiana
- Brooklyn/Crown Heights, New York City
- Cure Violence/NYC Mission Society, Harlem, New York City
- Stand Against Violence, East Harlem, New York City
- 49 Strong Saving Lives, Staten island
- Save our Streets, Bronx, New York City
- Cure Violence, South Jamaica, New York City
- Cure Violence Philadelphia
- Philadelphia CeaseFire
- City of San Antonio- Stand Up SA
- Cease Violence, Wilmington, Delaware (inactive)
- Taller de Salud, Inc., Loiza Puerto Rico

=== International sites ===
- CeaseFire Hanover Park (two sites), in Hanover Park, Cape Town, South Africa
- Project Reason in Laventille, Port of Spain, Trinidad and Tobago
- Cristo de la Roca in San Pedro Sula, Honduras
- Cure Violence plus PeaceTXT messaging to reduce election violence, Sisi Ni Amani-Kenya
- American Islamic Congress, three sites in Basrah and two sites in Sadr City-Baghdad, Iraq
- Ciudad Juarez, Mexico
- Barrio Positivo, Honduras
- CeaseFire Halifax, Canada

=== Programs influenced by the Cure Violence approach ===
- Advance Peace in Richmond, California
- READI in Chicago, Illinois
- Operation SNUG in New York
- CYO, Inc. in Oakland, California
- The Chaos Theory (The Safety Box) in London, UK

== In the media ==
- The Interrupters, a documentary featuring Cure Violence (then CeaseFire) workers in Chicago.
- A Path Appears: Transforming Lives, Creating Opportunity; Nicholas D. Kristof and Sheryl WuDunn
- "Violence as a Public Health Problem: A Most Violent Year" by Lloyd Sederer, Huffington Post, 12/9/2014
- Out of the Mountains: The Coming Age of the Urban Guerrilla; David Kilcullen
- Beyond Suppression: Global Perspectives on Youth Violence; Joan Serra Hoffman, Lyndee Knox, and Robert Cohen
- Epidemiological Criminology: Theory to Practice; edited by Eve Waltermaurer, Timothy A. Akers
- "Contagion of Violence" – 2012 Institute of Medicine report
- "Cure Violence: A Disease Control Approach to Reduce Violence and Change Behavior" – by Charles Ransford, Candice Kane, and Gary Slutkin
