= Adeiyewunmi Osinubi =

American documentary filmmaker (born 1996)

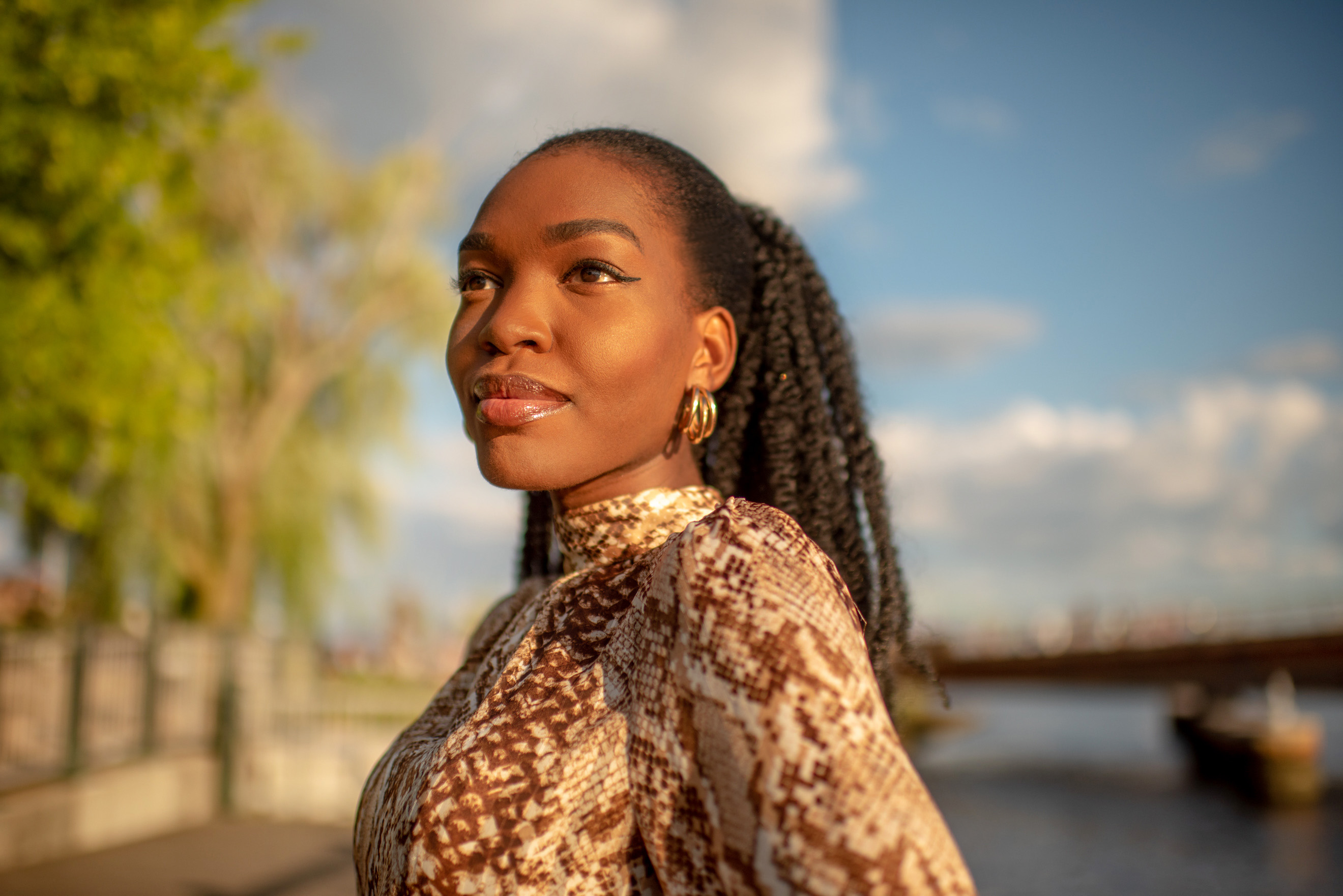
- Born: 1996 (age 29–30)
- Education: Brown University, Brown University Warren Alpert Medical School
- Occupations: Physician, Filmmaker, Writer
- Known for: Health Advocacy
- Awards: National Minority Quality Forum 40 under 40 Leader in Health Black Health Connect 40 under 40 awardee
- Website: www.adeosinubi.com

Adeiyewunmi "Ade" Osinubi (born 1996) is an American physician, documentary filmmaker, and writer. She is an emergency medicine Resident Physician at the University of Pennsylvania School of Medicine and she is the producer of Black Motherhood through the Lens, a documentary film about four Black women's experiences in navigating reproductive health disparities. Due to her work in health equity and media, she has performed over 60 speaking engagements at Harvard University, Johns Hopkins, the Black Mamas Matter Alliance, and the National Birth Equity Collaborative. She has written multiple articles about health inequities for The Washington Post, ABC News, Huff Post, The Philadelphia Inquirer, Teen Vogue, Essence, and Glamour Magazine. She has been featured in Forbes, PBS, and The Brown Daily Herald. Osinubi is the recipient of the National Minority Quality Forum 40 under 40 Leader in Health Award, the 40 under 40 Black Health Connect Award, was recognized as a 2024 Boston Celtics "Hero Among Us" and is a member of the Alpha Omega Alpha and Gold Humanism medical honor societies.

== Early life and education ==
Osinubi was raised in Somerset, New Jersey and is the daughter of Nigerian immigrants. Her mother, Dr. Omowunmi Osinubi, studied medicine at a well known research university in Nigeria, the University of Ibadan, and specializes in occupational and environmental health. Her father, Dr. Adewole Osinubi received his PhD at the prestigious Imperial College London and is an actuary. Osinubi attended the Groton School, a competitive New England Boarding school and graduated summa cum laude. While in high school, she co-founded the Iris Fistula Project, a non-profit organization that supports women with obstetric fistula, a devastating birth injury that disproportionately impacts women in low resource settings. Through this initiative, she raised over $20,000 to support women affected by this condition. At the age of 17, she received admission to Brown University and the Warren Alpert Medical School of Brown University through the Program in Liberal Medical Education (PLME) where she would go on to receive a Bachelor of Arts in public health in 2018 and a Doctor of Medicine in 2022. At Brown, she was the co-president of the Black Student Union and received the Alfred Joslin Award for her efforts in 2018. Following graduation, she went on to pursue emergency medicine residency at the University of Pennsylvania School of Medicine.

== Research and career ==
Osinubi's mission is to eradicate health inequities impacting underserved women through media, advocacy, and research. From a young age, Ade has been interested in storytelling and has pursued photography, filmmaking, and writing endeavors. Her work focuses on sharing the stories of minoritized communities that often go untold. Starting from her first year of medical school, she independently produced an award-winning documentary film entitled Black Motherhood through the Lens. The film showcases four Black women's experiences in navigating childbirth, infertility, and postpartum mood and anxiety disorders amongst racial health inequities. The film has been accepted to seven film festivals, notably the American Public Health Association Film Festival.

Based on her leadership in the reproductive equity space, Ade has been invited to speak at organizations, universities, and colleges across the nation. She has given talks at the Black Mamas Matter Alliance National Black Maternal Health Week, the National Birth Equity Collaborative National Infertility Week, the Afro-Pics Caribbean Cultural Center African Diaspora Institute, and many more. Her work has also been widely recognized, notably in Forbes Magazine, PBS, and on ABC News affiliate WCVB Boston "City Line".

Apart from film, Ade has used writing as a medium to raise awareness about health inequities. She has published articles regarding infertility and postpartum mood disorder disparities that were featured on the front pages of The Washington Post Health and Science section and Glamour Magazine. Her first author publication in Pediatrics about dismantling race-based puberty guidelines has led to profession-wide changes in the field of pediatric endocrinology. It was cited on UptoDate, a highly used clinical resource tool, and contributed to race being removed as a risk factor for precocious puberty on the website. Additionally, it has been described as a "practice changing" article that has served as an impetus for hospitals and health organizations to work to eradicate race-based puberty guidelines across the nation.

== Awards and honors ==
- Rock Health Top 50 in Digital Health "Storyteller" Award
- Boston Celtics 2024 "Hero Among Us"
- National Minority Quality Forum 40 under 40 Leader in Minority Health Award
- Black Health Connect 40 under 40 Award
- American Medical Association (AMA) Foundation Physicians of Tomorrow Scholar
- Alpha Omega Alpha Honor Society
- Gold Humanism Honor Society
- Rhode Island Black Film Festival 2021 Best Short Collective
- Delta Omega Honorary Society in Public Health
- Alfred H. Joslin Award for Outstanding Contribution to Student Life
- Brown University Medical Humanities Award

== Selected publications ==
- "US cancer deaths decrease, but global cases expected to soar, new report warns." ABC News
- "Exposure to 'forever chemicals' before birth linked to higher blood pressure in kids." ABC News
- "Breast cancer strikes young Black women at alarming rate | Expert Opinion." The Philadelphia Inquirer
- "This Feature Of My Smile Links Me To My Roots — And I’m Not Getting Rid Of It." Huff Post
- "For Black parents with postpartum depression, help can be difficult to find." The Washington Post
- "What it's like to be a Black Girl with Early Puberty," Teen Vogue
- 'It Feels Like A Thousand Needles Are Being Poked Into You At Once': The Physical And Mental Toll Of Sickle Cell Disease," Essence
- "Where Are All the Black Women at the Fertility Clinic?" Glamour Magazine, 2021
- Osinubi, A. A., Lewis-de Los Angeles, C. P., Poitevien, P., & Topor, L. S. (2022). Are Black Girls Exhibiting Puberty Earlier? Examining Implications of Race-Based Guidelines. Pediatrics, 150(2), e2021055595. https://doi.org/10.1542/peds.2021-055595
- Kanchi, R., Perlman, S. E., Tabaei, B., Schwartz, M. D., Islam, N., Chernov, C., Osinubi, A., & Thorpe, L. E. (2021). Metabolic syndrome among New York City (NYC) adults: change in prevalence from 2004 to 2013–2014 using New York City Health and Nutrition Examination Survey. Annals of Epidemiology, 58, 56–63. https://doi.org/10.1016/j.annepidem.2021.02.014
- Osinubi, Adeiyewunmi. "Sex and Gender Differences in Lower Extremity Amputation-associated Morbidity and Mortality." American Medical Women's Association, Sex and Gender Health Collaborative, 2021
- "Adire: Keeper of Yoruba Culture." The Native Magazine,
- "How 'SKIN', A Photo Series on Colorism, Displays and Celebrates the Beautiful Shades of Blackness." Blavity
