= Louise Charbonneau =

Louise Charbonneau may refer to

- Louise Charbonneau (politician), Member of Parliament of Canada
- Louise Charbonneau (judge), judge in Canada
