= Shiriki Kumanyika =

American epidemiologist and academic

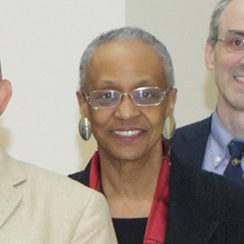
- in 2015
- Education: Syracuse University; Columbia University; Cornell University; Johns Hopkins University
- Known for: Obesity research
- Scientific career
- Workplaces: University of Pennsylvania; Cornell University; Johns Hopkins University

Shiriki K. Kumanyika is an Emeritus Professor of Biostatistics and Epidemiology at the Perelman School of Medicine at the University of Pennsylvania and co-chair of the International Association for the Study of Obesity International Obesity Task Force. She has previously served as Associate Dean for Disease Prevention and was founding director of the University of Pennsylvania Master of Public Health. She chairs the African American Collaborative Obesity Research Network. She is the former president of the American Public Health Association.

== Education and early career ==
Kumanyika studied psychology at Syracuse University. She moved to Columbia University in 1965 where she earned a Master's degree in social work. She became a member of the American Public Health Association in 1976. She joined Cornell University, despite facing adversity due to her unconventional degree path before her PhD, for her graduate studies and completed a PhD in human nutrition in 1978. She worked at Cornell University as an assistant professor of nutrition between 1977 and 1984. Kumanyika went on to achieve a Master of Public Health at Johns Hopkins University in 1984. She was appointed to the faculty of epidemiology and international health at Johns Hopkins University, and made co-director of the Global Obesity Prevention Centre. She worked at Johns Hopkins University between 1984 and 1989. She was a member of Delta Omega. She served on the Committee on the Ethical and Legal Issues Relating to the Inclusion of Women in 1994, assessing women's participation in clinical trials and the controversy surrounding the issues. She looked at trials of diet, exercise and weight loss for African American women, identifying tension inherent in clinical trial design.

== Research ==
Kumanyika's research identified effective ways to reduce chronic diseases related to nutrition. Her efforts were focussed on achieving health equity for black Americans. African Americans, Hispanics and American Indians are most severely impacted by obesity. Kumanyika has studied the impact of obesity, salt-intake and other aspects of diet on human health. She has always looked to embed cultural knowledge and sensitivities when implementing initiatives to reduce health disparities. She joined the University of Pennsylvania in 1989 and was made a professor in 1993. She was a Senior Fellow in the University of Pennsylvania Leonard Davis Institute of Health Economics and the Institute on Aging. She was a member of the 1995 and 2000 Dietary Guidelines Advisory Committee. In 1997 she published a comprehensive study of the possible adverse effects of sodium reduction.

At the University of Pennsylvania she launched several weight loss trials, including TONE (Trials of Nonpharmacologic Intervention in the Elderly) and HOPE (Healthy Eating & Lifestyle Program). TONE participants were recruited from Maryland, New Jersey, North Carolina and Tennessee, and was for people with a body mass index lower than 33 (37 for women). HELP enrolled a more obese population, and was directed at fat and sodium reduction. In 2002 she founded the African American Collaborative Obesity Research Network, AACORN. AACORN is funded by a National Institutes of Health health disparities grant. AACORN looks to improve the quality and quantity of research on weight related issues in African American communities, focussing on influencing policy, developing networks and translating research into practise. AACORN have members across 20 states. She directed the National Institutes of Health funded Project EXPORT, Excellence in Partnerships for Community Outreach, Research, and Training.

She published the Handbook for Obesity Prevention with Springer Publishing in 2007. The handbook provides information about how to prevent obesity, providing a set of solutions for a variety of audiences. She produced an issue of Epidemiologic Review focused on obesity which collated articles covering what we do and do not know about obesity. She became increasingly interested in population-wide approaches to prevent obesity, complementing clinical prevention.

She has studied how racial and health disparities are presented in US newspapers, finding the largest disparities in HIV/AIDS, cardiovascular disease and cancer. From 2008 to 2011 she was Vice Chair for the United States Department of Health and Human Services Secretary's Advisory Committee for Healthy Promotion and Disease Prevention. In 2012 she was an expert of the HBO - National Academy of Medicine documentary Weight of the Nation. The documentary reported that 20% of women's and 14% of men's cancer cases are caused by obesity. In 2013 she wrote the World Innovation Summit for Health (WISH) foundation Obesity Report with Ara Darzi. She became an emeritus professor at the Perelman School of Medicine at the University of Pennsylvania in 2014 and joined the Dornsife School at Drexel University as a research professor in 2015.

=== Awards and honours ===
Selected awards and honours include:

2017 The Obesity Society Bar-Or Award for Excellence in Pediatric Obesity Research

2015 Centers for Disease Control and Prevention Office of Minority Health and Health Equity Health Equity Champion

2015 The Obesity Society Diversity Leadership Award

2015 State University of New York Downstate Medical Center Honorary Doctorate of Science

2014 National Institutes of Health Robert S. Gordon Jr. Lecture

2013 President-elect of the American Public Health Association.

2011 American Public Health Association Wade Hampton Frost Lecture

2007 Woman's Day Red Dress Award

2006 American Journal of Health Promotion Robert F. Allen Symbol of H.O.P.E. (Helping Other People through Empowerment) Award

2005 American Heart Association Population Research Prize

2005 Association of Black Cardiologists Dr. Herbert W. Nickens Epidemiology Award

2003 elected to the National Academy of Medicine

1998 American Public Health Association Excellence in Dietary Guidance Award

1997 The Franklin Institute Bolton L. Corson Medal for Nutrition Research

1996 Fellow of the American College of Epidemiology

1992 Fellow of the American Heart Association
