= President Ji =

President Ji may refer to:

- Ji Chaoding (1903–1963), Chinese economist, president of the Chicago Chinese Student Association in the 1920s
- Ji Baocheng (born 1944), Chinese educator, president of Renmin University of China from 2000 to 2011
- Ji Jiafu (born 1959), Chinese surgical oncologist, president of Peking University Cancer Hospital since 2011
- Ji Xiangqi (born 1960), Chinese politician and business executive, president of Shandong Commercial Group from 2002 to 2010
- Ji Sang-wook (born 1965), South Korean politician, president of the New Conservative Party since 2020

== See also ==
- Ji (surname), a list of the various Chinese surnames romanised as Ji
- -ji, an honorific suffix in various South Asian languages
- Xi Jinping (born 1953), General Secretary of the Chinese Communist Party and China's top leader since 2012
