= Anne B. Newman =

American research scientist

- Born: 1955 (age 70–71)
- Education: University of Pittsburgh
- Occupations: Physician, Geriatrics & Gerontology Expert, Educator
- Employer: University of Pittsburgh
- Spouse: Frank Kirkwood
- Children: 3

Anne B. Newman (born 1955) is an American scientist who researches epidemiology and gerontology. She received her Bachelor's, Master's and M.D. degrees from the University of Pittsburgh. Newman's primary focus of study is on atherosclerosis, longevity and what specific factors allow for people to thrive while aging. She focuses on geriatrics, gerontology and epidemiology. She was the first scholar to be awarded the Katherine M. Detre Endowed Chair of Population Health Science at the University of Pittsburgh. She has been listed on the annual ISI Web of Knowledge most highly cited scientists for 2015, as published by Thomson Reuters. Newman is a member of the Delta Omega Honor Society in Public Health and the American Epidemiology Society. Newman's highest qualifications are in geriatric medicine and her certification is through the American Board of Internal Medicine. Newman lives in Point Breeze Pennsylvania with her husband, Frank Kirkwood. She is a mother of three.

== Education ==
In 1978, Newman graduated from the University of Pittsburgh in 1978 with a bachelor's degree in biology. She earned her M.D. in 1982 from the University of Pittsburgh's School of Medicine. Newman completed her residency at Presbyterian University Hospital in Pittsburgh, Pennsylvania. She continued to serve at this same hospital for her fellowship in geriatrics. Upon completion of her fellowship in 1987, Newman also received her master's degree in public health from the University of Pittsburgh.

== Research ==
Newman began her research career with the National Heart, Lung, and Blood Institute's 19-year Cardiovascular Health Study in 1988, which evaluated men and women 65-years-old or more for the risk factors, consequences, and natural history of cardiovascular disease. She has also researched body mass and the effect of abdominal fat verses lower-body fat (fat deposits on the hips, thighs and buttocks), confirming that where the body stores fat impacts health. She has researched the impact of fitness on cognitive, muscle and physical function in aging and longevity. Newman has been involved in and served as the lead investigator for multiple long-term studies conducted with grants from the National Institute of Health and the CDC on aging. She is currently working as a Principal Investigator on clinical trials for the National Institute on Aging (NIA). Her current studies include Lifestyle and Independence for the Elderly (2009-2016), ASPirin to Reduce Events in the Elderly (2009-2016), The Long Life Family Study (2004-2019), and the CHS All Stars Study (Exceptional Aging: 12 Year Trajectories to function (2004-2016).

== Achievement ==
In 2005, Newman joined the faculty at the University of Pittsburgh where she is both the chair of the department of epidemiology and director of the Center for Aging and Population Health. This center features a CDC Prevention Center which is acclaimed for its training of doctoral fellows in the Epidemiology of Aging, which was recognized with the NIA National Service Award. Newman teaches four classes at the University of Pittsburgh: Advanced Epidemiology of Aging, Biology and Physiology of Aging, Writing in Epidemiology: Manuscripts and Grants, and Epidemiological Basis for Disease Control. In 2014 she was honored as the first scholar to receive appointment as the Katherine M. Detre Endowed Chair of Population Health Science at the University of Pittsburgh. Newman has published more than 500 articles in scientific journals, is the Associate Editor of the Journal of Gerontology: Medical Science. She has been listed on the annual ISI Web of Knowledge most highly cited scientists for 2015, which was published by Thomson Reuters. She is the most cited author of a number of medical journals in his field: Journal of the American Geriatrics Society, Journals of Gerontology Series A-biological Sciences and Medical Sciences, Annals of Epidemiology, Archives of Internal Medicine.

== Publications ==
- Sebastiani, Paola; Thyagarajan, Bharat; Sun, Fangui; Schupf, Nicole; Newman, Anne B.; Montano, Monty; Perls, Thomas T. (2017-01-06). "Biomarker signatures of aging". Aging Cell. 16 (2): 329–338. doi:10.1111/acel.12557. ISSN 1474-9726. PMC 5334528. PMID 28058805.
- Santanasto, Adam J.; Glynn, Nancy W.; Jubrias, Sharon A.; Conley, Kevin E.; Boudreau, Robert M.; Amati, Francesca; Mackey, Dawn C.; Simonsick, Eleanor M.; Strotmeyer, Elsa S. (2016-12-09). "Skeletal Muscle Mitochondrial Function and Fatigability in Older Adults". The Journals of Gerontology Series A: Biological Sciences and Medical Sciences. 70 (11): 1379–1385. doi:10.1093/gerona/glu134. ISSN 1079-5006. PMC 4612379. PMID 25167867.
- Reinders, Ilse; Murphy, Rachel A.; Martin, Kathryn R.; Brouwer, Ingeborg A.; Visser, Marjolein; White, Daniel K.; Newman, Anne B.; Houston, Denise K.; Kanaya, Alka M. (2016-12-09). "BMI Trajectories in relation to Change in Lean Mass and Physical Function: The Health ABC Study". Journal of the American Geriatrics Society. 63 (8): 1615–1621. doi:10.1111/jgs.13524. ISSN 0002-8614. PMC 4785850. PMID 26289686.
- Perera, Subashan; Patel, Kushang V.; Rosano, Caterina; Rubin, Susan M.; Satterfield, Suzanne; Harris, Tamara; Ensrud, Kristine; Orwoll, Eric; Lee, Christine G. (2016-12-09). "Gait Speed Predicts Incident Disability: A Pooled Analysis". The Journals of Gerontology Series A: Biological Sciences and Medical Sciences. 71 (1): 63–71. doi:10.1093/gerona/glv126. ISSN 1079-5006. PMC 4715231. PMID 26297942.
- Corrales-Medina, Vicente F.; Taljaard, Monica; Yende, Sachin; Kronmal, Richard; Dwivedi, Girish; Newman, Anne B.; Elkind, Mitchell S.V.; Lyles, Mary F.; Chirinos, Julio A. (2016-12-09). "Intermediate and Long-Term Risk of New-Onset Heart Failure after Hospitalization for Pneumonia in Elderly Adults". American Heart Journal. 170 (2): 306–312.e6. doi:10.1016/j.ahj.2015.04.028. ISSN 0002-8703. PMC 4548825. PMID 26299228.
- Katzman, Shana M.; Strotmeyer, Elsa S.; Nalls, Michael A.; Zhao, Yiqiang; Mooney, Sean; Schork, Nik; Newman, Anne B.; Harris, Tamara B.; Yaffe, Kristine (2016-12-09). "Mitochondrial DNA Sequence Variation Associated With Peripheral Nerve Function in the Elderly". The Journals of Gerontology Series A: Biological Sciences and Medical Sciences. 70 (11): 1400–1408. doi:10.1093/gerona/glu175. ISSN 1079-5006. PMC 4612380. PMID 25394619.
- Åsvold, Bjørn O.; Vatten, Lars J.; Bjøro, Trine; Bauer, Douglas C.; Bremner, Alexandra; Cappola, Anne R.; Ceresini, Graziano; den Elzen, Wendy P. J.; Ferrucci, Luigi (2016-12-09). "Thyroid Function Within the Normal Range and Risk of Coronary Heart Disease". JAMA Internal Medicine. 175 (6): 1037–1047. doi:10.1001/jamainternmed.2015.0930. ISSN 2168-6106. PMC 4732559. PMID 25893284.
- Marcum, Zachary A.; Perera, Subashan; Newman, Anne B.; Thorpe, Joshua M.; Switzer, Galen E.; Gray, Shelly L.; Simonsick, Eleanor M.; Shorr, Ronald I.; Bauer, Douglas C. (2016-12-09). "Antihypertensive Use and Recurrent Falls in Community-Dwelling Older Adults: Findings From the Health ABC Study". The Journals of Gerontology Series A: Biological Sciences and Medical Sciences. 70 (12): 1562–1568. doi:10.1093/gerona/glv095. ISSN 1079-5006. PMC 4643613. PMID 26265732.
- Sink, Kaycee M.; Espeland, Mark A.; Castro, Cynthia M.; Church, Timothy; Cohen, Ron; Dodson, John A.; Guralnik, Jack; Hendrie, Hugh C.; Jennings, Janine (2015-08-25). "Effect of a 24-Month Physical Activity Intervention vs Health Education on Cognitive Outcomes in Sedentary Older Adults: The LIFE Randomized Trial". JAMA. 314 (8): 781–790. doi:10.1001/jama.2015.9617. ISSN 1538-3598. PMC 4698980. PMID 26305648.
- Chalhoub, Didier; Cawthon, Peggy M.; Ensrud, Kristine E.; Stefanick, Marcia L.; Kado, Deborah M.; Boudreau, Robert; Greenspan, Susan; Newman, Anne; Zmuda, Joseph (2016-12-09). "Risk of non-spine fractures among older men and women with sarcopenia, low bone mass, or both". Journal of the American Geriatrics Society. 63 (9): 1733–1740. doi:10.1111/jgs.13605. ISSN 0002-8614. PMC 4625906. PMID 26310882.
- Hall, Martica H.; Smagula, Stephen F.; Boudreau, Robert M.; Ayonayon, Hilsa N.; Goldman, Suzanne E.; Harris, Tamara B.; Naydeck, Barbara L.; Rubin, Susan M.; Samuelsson, Laura (2015-02-01). "Association between Sleep Duration and Mortality Is Mediated by Markers of Inflammation and Health in Older Adults: The Health, Aging and Body Composition Study". Sleep. 38 (2): 189–195. doi:10.5665/sleep.4394. ISSN 0161-8105. PMC 4288599. PMID 25348127.
