= Terets =

Teret or Terets may be a reference to:

== Things ==
- Tourette syndrome, a neurological disorder
- Teres major muscle, an upper back muscle attaching the upper limb
- Teres minor muscle, an upper back muscle attaching the rotator cuff
- Terete, adjective meaning cylindrical with a tapering end or ends
- Terets (gunboat), an Imperial Russian gunboat
- Terret, part of a horse harness

== People ==
- Christopher Teret, member of Company, a band
- Ray Teret, British radio DJ
- Stephen Teret, Johns Hopkins professor

== Arts, entertainment, and media ==
=== Films ===
- The Load (Teret, Терет), a Serbian war drama film directed by Ognjen Glavonić
