= Vernick =

Vernick is a surname. Notable people with the surname include:

- Audrey Vernick, American children's book author
- Edith Vernick (1906–1992), Ukrainian-American animator
- Jon Vernick, American academic
