= Kami Kandola =

Indo-Canadian public health officer

Kami Kandola MD

Chief Medical Officer of the Northwest Territories
- Incumbent
- Assumed office October 1, 2018
- Premier: Caroline Cochrane; R.J. Simpson
- Public Health Responses Overseen: COVID-19
- Preceded by: Andre Corriveau

Personal details
- Born: England
- Children: 4
- Education: McGill University, MD, 1994; Johns Hopkins University, MPH, 1998
- Previous Workplaces: Canadian International Development Agency

Kami Kandola is a Canadian physician and the Chief Public Health Officer for the Northwest Territories, Canada. She is trained in family medicine, public health, and preventive medicine. Kandola oversaw the response to the COVID-19 pandemic in the Northwest Territories.

== Early life and education ==
Kandola grew up in England before moving to Montreal, Quebec when she was nine years old. She has noted that she wanted to grow up to become a doctor from an early age.

In 1992, Kandola received an M.D. from McGill University, where she specialized in family medicine. She then attended Johns Hopkins University from 1996 to 1998 where she received her Masters in Public Health and performed her residency in Preventive Medicine. There, she was inducted into the Delta Omega National Public Health Honor Society. During her time at Johns Hopkins, she also served in a mission hospital on the Ivory Coast of West Africa.

== Career ==
From 1998 to 2003, Kandola worked as a health specialist consultant in the Canadian International Development Agency (CIDA), working with international health organizations, including the World Health Organization and the World Bank During her time at CIDA, she lent her expertise in regions of Brazil, India, Côte d'Ivoire, and China.

In 2003, she moved to Yellowknife, the capital city of the Northwest Territories to become a regional medical officer under the leadership of Andre Corriveau. In 2009, she briefly rose to the role of chief medical officer to oversee the region's response to the 2009 swine flu pandemic. At the peak of the pandemic, 25 of the territory's 33 communities had identified cases of H1N1. In that role, she also supervised the roll-out of the H1N1 vaccine, organizing immunization action teams as 34,000 doses were shipped to vaccinate Northwest Territory residents.

On October 1, 2018, Kandola assumed the position of Chief Medical Officer of the Northwest Territories, succeeding Andre Corriveau.

=== COVID-19 Response ===
Kandola has overseen the Northwest Territories' response to the coronavirus disease 2019 (COVID-19) pandemic in the Northwest Territories. Once the public health emergency was declared on March 18, 2020, she noted that more than 1,000 students would be returning to Yellowknife from spring break, which would risk bringing new infections into the region. As a result, from March 21 through April 27, 2020, she oversaw the order for all returning residents of the region to self-isolate for 14 days, granting exemptions for essential workers. These measures also tightened security along the border to reduce unnecessary travel out of the territory. On April 27 through May 12, she and her team tightened the rule to require that essential workers crossing the border must also self-isolate unless they have written permission exempting them. Kandola has cited these precautions as the reason the Northwest Territories was able to prevent community spread of the disease and limit its caseload.

On May 15, 2020, Kandola declared that the Northwest Territories would ease some of their imposed restrictions, entering in.to phase one of its pandemic recovery plan. The announcement came 28 days after the territory's last active COVID-19 case. Under the first phase, select businesses and institutions, including schools, hair salons, and museums, would be allowed to reopen with appropriate physical distancing measures in place. In addition, the new measures would permit five people to visit a given house, with no more than 10 people in a house at any given time. In this phase, however, border controls remain the same, only allowing residents, essential workers, and a few addition exemptions into the territory.

During the COVID-19 pandemic, Kandola’s response drew public and media attention and praise. During a press conference in April 2020, Kandola stated that her office would not identify a small community within the Northwest Territories that had a confirmed COVID-19 case to protect members of that community from being "abused, shunned, and threatened." She also warned that if anyone is found guilty of threatening COVID-19 patients would be met with enforcement. First Nations Chief Louis Balsillie and Fort Resolution Mayor Patrick Simon, however, have been critical of this policy, noting the importance of knowing whether or not their community has been any active infections.

== Selected works and publications ==
- Kandola, Kami; Bergevin, Yves (October 2000). "Immunization and child health in developing countries: Canada's response". Paediatrics & Child Health. 5 (7): 378–380. doi:10.1093/PCH/5.7.378. PMC 2819934. PMID 20177537.
- Hinman, AR; Irons, B; Lewis, M; Kandola, K (2002). "Economic analyses of rubella and rubella vaccines: a global review". Bulletin of the World Health Organization. 80 (4): 264–70. PMC 2567775. PMID 12075361.
- Case, Cheryl; Kandola, Kami; Chui, Linda; Li, Vincent; Nix, Nancy; Johnson, Rhonda (8 May 2013). "Examining DNA fingerprinting as an epidemiology tool in the tuberculosis program in the Northwest Territories, Canada". International Journal of Circumpolar Health. 72 (1) 20067. doi:10.3402/IJCH.V72I0.20067. PMC 3650219. PMID 23671837.
- Tsang, Raymond S.W.; Shuel, Michelle; Ahmad, Tauqeer; Hayden, Kristy; Knox, Natalie; Van Domselaar, Gary; Hoang, Linda; Tyrrell, Gregory J.; Minion, Jessica; Van Caeseele, Paul; Kus, Julianne V.; Ulanova, Marina; Lefebvre, Brigitte; Haldane, David; Garceau, Richard; German, Greg; Zahariadis, George; Hanley, Brendan; Kandola, Kami; Patterson, Michael (February 2020). "Whole genome sequencing to study the phylogenetic structure of serotype a recovered from patients in Canada". Canadian Journal of Microbiology. 66 (2): 99–110. doi:10.1139/CJM-2019-0406. hdl:1807/98576. PMID 31661630.
