= CHARGE study =

Childhood autism risk factor study

The CHARGE study, which stands for Childhood Autism Risks from Genetics and the Environment, was launched in 2003 by researchers at the MIND Institute. The goal of the study is to research the role of gene-environment interactions in influencing autism risk. Scientists involved in the research have included Irva Hertz-Picciotto, serving as the study's principal investigator. The study is funded by the National Institutes of Health. Over 1,000 families have participated in the study. The children in the study are divided into three groups: children with autism, children with developmental delay, and children chosen at random from the general population.

== Research ==
A number of peer-reviewed papers have been produced as a result of this study. They have concluded that:

- There is an association between living near a freeway and risk of autism.
- No association was found between blood levels of mercury and autism among a group of children studied at two-to-five years of age.
- There is an association between exposure to traffic-related air pollution and autism risk.
- There may be a causative link between both exposure to air pollution, a variant in the MET receptor tyrosine kinase gene and risk of autism.
- Maternal use of folic acid supplements may be associated with a decreased risk of autism. However, the researchers cautioned that further research is warranted to confirm or refute this finding.
- Maternal fever during pregnancy is associated with an increased risk of autism in her child.
- Gastrointestinal problems are significantly more common in children with autism than children without autism.
