= Credible messenger program =

Social program in which a community aids and influences itself

A credible messenger program is a social program that employs accepted members of a community to aid and influence others in the community, usually intended to reduce violence. American cities have used this approach to address gang and gun violence in cities, in which community members who share lived experiences with perpetrators of violence work directly with those individuals to change their perspective on violence and provide public programming to change community norms around violence. The groups often patrol areas, similar to beat cops, but without guns or ability to arrest.

Gun violence in Chicago declined with Gary Slutkin's credible messenger program. Agape Movement in Minneapolis receives public funds as a mechanism for public safety since reducing police funding after the murder of George Floyd. The group's credible messengers include convicts and former gang members who intervene in interpersonal conflicts and squabbles to reduce crime. Minneapolis is monitoring the program's efficacy annually. Similar programs are active in New York, Los Angeles, and Chicago.
