= Lisa Morrissey LaVange =

American biostatistician (born 1953)

- Born: 1953 (age 72–73)
- Occupations: Professor and Chair of the Department of Biostatistics; 2018 President of the American Statistical Association
- Known for: Clinical trials design and analysis and drug regulatory process

Academic background
- Education: University of Massachusetts, Amherst; University of North Carolina
- Doctoral advisor: Ron Helms

Academic work
- Discipline: Biostatistics
- Institutions: UNC Gillings School of Global Public Health

Lisa Morrissey LaVange (born 1953) is professor and chair of the Department of Biostatistics in the Gillings School of Global Public Health at the University of North Carolina at Chapel Hill where she directs the department’s Collaborative Studies Coordinating Center (CSCC), overseeing faculty, staff, and students involved in large-scale clinical trials and epidemiological studies coordinated by the center. She returned to her alma mater in 2018 after serving as the director of the Office of Biostatistics in the United States Food and Drug Administration (FDA) Center for Drug Evaluation and Research (CDER). Her career also includes 16 years in non-profit research and 10 years in the pharmaceutical industry. She served as the 2007 president of the Eastern North American Region (ENAR) of the International Biometric Society (IBS), and as the 2018 American Statistical Association (ASA) president.

== Research ==
LaVange is recognized for her contributions to statistical methodology utilized in the drug discovery process through clinical trials. She is also recognized for her expertise on the statistical methodology of drug regulation.

== Education ==
LaVange graduated from Harpeth Hall, a college preparatory school for girls in Nashville, TN, in 1971. She credits the mentoring she received from accomplished female teachers as critical in her decision to continue her education in mathematics and statistics. She entered the University of North Carolina as a member of the sixth class open to women and earned a Bachelor of Arts in mathematics in 1974. She earned a Master of Arts in mathematics from the University of Massachusetts, Amherst in 1976. After earning her master's degree she worked as a mathematician at before returning to the University of North Carolina to pursue a PhD in biostatistics. She received her degree in 1983.

== Career ==
LaVange has worked in all sectors - academia, government, and industry. In January, 2018 she returned to her alma mater, the University of North Carolina (UNC) as professor and associate chair of the Department of Biostatistics. She is also director of the department's Collaborative Studies Coordinating Center (CSCC). This appointment is the second time, LaVange has been a member of the UNC faculty having served on the faculty from 2005 until 2011. Beginning in 2011 through 2017, she served as the director of the Office of Biostatistics in the Food and Drug Administration (FDA) Center for Drug Evaluation and Research (CDER). Her early career was spent at Research Triangle Institute (RTI). She began her career at RTI after completing her master's degree. She left to begin doctoral work, returned while completing her dissertation and remained for a total span of 15 years. Her work in the private sector also included senior leadership positions in the pharmaceutical industry.

== Honors ==
- She is a 1973 inductee into Phi Beta Kappa and in 1998 was inducted into the Delta Omega Public Health Honor Society.
- She is a fellow of the American Statistical Association, elected in 2004.
- She received the COPD Foundation Award for Outstanding Contribution in COPD Research (2011).
- She received three Federal Drug Administration (FDA) Group Recognition Awards (2014, 2015, 2016).
