= Irva Hertz-Picciotto =

American epidemiologist

Irva Hertz-Picciotto (born c. 1948) is an environmental epidemiologist best known for her studies of autism. She is Professor and Chief of the Division of Environmental and Occupational Health in the Department of Public Health Sciences, at the University of California, Davis (UC-Davis). In addition, she is on the Research Faculty of the MIND (Medical Investigation of Neurodevelopmental Disorders) Institute at UC-Davis; the Deputy Director of the UC-Davis Center for Children's Environmental Health; and on the faculty of the Center for Occupational and Environmental Health of the Universities of California at Berkeley, Davis, and San Francisco. Hertz-Picciotto serves on the advisory board of the anti-toxic chemical NGO Healthy Child, Healthy World.

== Biography ==
Hertz-Picciotto received four degrees from the University of California at Berkeley: a B.A. in Mathematics in 1970, an M.P.H. in Epidemiology in 1984, a M.A. in Biostatistics in 1985, and a Ph.D. in Epidemiology in 1989. She was on the faculty of the University of North Carolina at Chapel Hill for 12 years before joining UC-Davis.

She has published over 170 scientific articles, including:

- In 2009, Hertz-Picciotto and Delwiche analyzed data on autism in California and concluded that "younger ages at diagnosis, differential migration, changes in diagnostic criteria, and inclusion of milder cases do not fully explain the observed increases." After publication of the article, she was quoted as saying that "It’s time to start looking for the environmental culprits responsible for the remarkable increase in the rate of autism in California."
- She was the senior author of a 2010 study that detected autism "clusters" in California associated with high levels of education among the children's parents.
- She was the senior author of another 2010 study using California data that showed that maternal age is associated with a higher risk of autism "regardless of the paternal age."

== Selected research projects ==
Current research projects for which Hertz-Picciotto is principal investigator include:

- Childhood Autism Risks from Genetics and the Environment (CHARGE), a study begun in 2003.
- Markers of Autism Risk in Babies-Learning Early Signs (MARBLES), a study begun in 2006. It investigates biological and environmental exposures that may contribute to causing autism by following pregnant women who have a biological child with autism spectrum disorder.

Hertz-Picciotto also collaborates on the following studies, among others:

- National Children's Study to examine environmental influences on health and development, for which federal funding for the UC-Davis site was announced in 2007.
- Early Autism Risk Longitudinal Investigation (EARLI), a prospective study involving four sites that was launched in 2009 to elucidate risk factors and markers for autism spectrum disorder.

== Selected awards, recognition, and service ==
- Abraham Lilienfeld Student Prize Paper, Society for Epidemiologic Research, 1988
- Delta Omega Honorary Society in Public Health, inducted in 1998
- Chair, Committee to Review the Health Effects in Vietnam Veterans of Exposure to Herbicides, Institute of Medicine, 2000
- McGavran Award for Excellence in Teaching, Gillings School of Global Public Health, University of North Carolina at Chapel Hill, 2001
- Lifetime National Associate of the National Academies, National Academy of Sciences and National Research Council, 2002
- President, International Society for Environmental Epidemiology, 2002−2003
- President, Society for Epidemiologic Research, 2006
- Chair, Committee on Breast Cancer and the Environment: The Scientific Evidence, Research Methodology, and Future Directions, Institute of Medicine, 2010-
- Editorial Board, Environmental Health
- Editorial Board, Epidemiologic Perspectives & Innovations
- Research Screening Committee, California Air Resources Board

== Selected publications ==
- Hertz-Picciotto, I; Swan, SH; Neutra, RR; Samuels, SJ (July 1989). "Spontaneous abortions in relation to consumption of tap water: an application of methods from survival analysis to a pregnancy follow-up study". Am. J. Epidemiol. 130: 79–93. PMID 2787112.
- Abrams, B; Duncan, D; Hertz-Picciotto, I (August 1993). "A prospective study of dietary intake and acquired immune deficiency syndrome in HIV-seropositive homosexual men". J. Acquir. Immune Defic. Syndr. 6: 949–58. PMID 8100273.
- Arrighi, HM; Hertz-Picciotto, I (September 1993). "Definitions, sources, magnitude, effect modifiers, and strategies of reduction of the healthy worker effect". J Occup Med. 35: 890–2. PMID 8229339.
- Arrighi, HM; Hertz-Picciotto, I (March 1994). "The evolving concept of the healthy worker survivor effect". Epidemiology. 5: 189–96. PMID 8172994.
- Hertz-Picciotto, I (April 1995). "Epidemiology and quantitative risk assessment: a bridge from science to policy". Am J Public Health. 85: 484–91. PMC 1615131. PMID 7702110.
- Borja-Aburto, VH; Hertz-Picciotto, I; Rojas Lopez, M; Farias, P; Rios, C; Blanco, J (September 1999). "Blood lead levels measured prospectively and risk of spontaneous abortion". Am. J. Epidemiol. 150: 590–7. PMID 10489998.
- Hopenhayn-Rich, C; Browning, SR; Hertz-Picciotto, I; Ferreccio, C; Peralta, C; Gibb, H (July 2000). "Chronic arsenic exposure and risk of infant mortality in two areas of Chile". Environ. Health Perspect. 108: 667–73. PMC 1638185. PMID 10903622.
- Bell, EM; Hertz-Picciotto, I; Beaumont, JJ (March 2001). "A case-control study of pesticides and fetal death due to congenital anomalies". Epidemiology. 12: 148–56. PMID 11246574.
- James, RA; Hertz-Picciotto, I; Willman, E; Keller, JA; Charles, MJ (July 2002). "Determinants of serum polychlorinated biphenyls and organochlorine pesticides measured in women from the child health and development study cohort, 1963-1967". Environ. Health Perspect. 110: 617–24. PMC 1240905. PMID 12117636.
- Dole, N; Savitz, DA; Hertz-Picciotto, I; Siega-Riz, AM; McMahon, MJ; Buekens, P (January 2003). "Maternal stress and preterm birth". Am. J. Epidemiol. 157: 14–24. PMID 12505886.
- Hopenhayn, C; Ferreccio, C; Browning, SR; et al. (September 2003). "Arsenic exposure from drinking water and birth weight". Epidemiology. 14: 593–602. doi:10.1097/01.ede.0000072104.65240.69. PMID 14501275.
- Renwick, AG; Barlow, SM; Hertz-Picciotto, I; et al. (September 2003). "Risk characterisation of chemicals in food and diet". Food Chem. Toxicol. 41: 1211–71. PMID 12890421.
- Hertz-Picciotto, I; Croen, LA; Hansen, R; Jones, CR; van de Water, J; Pessah, IN (July 2006). "The CHARGE study: an epidemiologic investigation of genetic and environmental factors contributing to autism". Environ. Health Perspect. 114: 1119–25. PMC 1513329. PMID 16835068.
- Hertz-Picciotto, I; Park, HY; Dostal, M; Kocan, A; Trnovec, T; Sram, R (February 2008). "Prenatal exposures to persistent and non-persistent organic compounds and effects on immune system development". Basic Clin. Pharmacol. Toxicol. 102: 146–54. doi:10.1111/j.1742-7843.2007.00190.x. PMID 18226068.
- Hertz-Picciotto, I; Delwiche, L (2009). "The rise in autism and the role of age at diagnosis". Epidemiology. 20: 84–90. doi:10.1097/EDE.0b013e3181902d15. PMC 4113600. PMID 19234401.
- Van Meter, KC; Christiansen, LE; Delwiche, LD; Azari, R; Carpenter, TE; Hertz-Picciotto, I (2010). "Geographic distribution of autism in California: a retrospective birth cohort analysis". Autism Res. 3: 19–29. doi:10.1002/aur.110. PMC 4071143. PMID 20049980.
- Shelton, JF; Tancredi, DJ; Hertz-Picciotto, I (February 2010). "Independent and dependent contributions of advanced maternal and paternal ages to autism risk". Autism Res. 3: 30–9. doi:10.1002/aur.116. PMC 4068119. PMID 20143326.
