= American College of Epidemiology =

American organisation incorporated in 1979

The American College of Epidemiology (ACE) is an American organization incorporated in 1979 to support and promote the work of American epidemiologists. It is based in Raleigh, North Carolina.

Members of the American College of Epidemiology are permitted to use the acronym "MACE", after their names and titles, identifying themselves as such. Fellows may employ the acronym "FACE".

"The American College of Epidemiology is the professional organization dedicated to continued education and advocacy for epidemiologists in their efforts to promote public health. ACE serves the interests of its members through sponsorship of scientific meetings, publications, educational activities, recognition of outstanding contributions to the field, and advocacy for issues pertinent to the practice of epidemiology."

The ACE's official journal is the Annals of Epidemiology, which is published by Elsevier.

== See also ==
- Epidemiology
- Pathology
