= Ruth Link-Gelles =

American epidemiologist

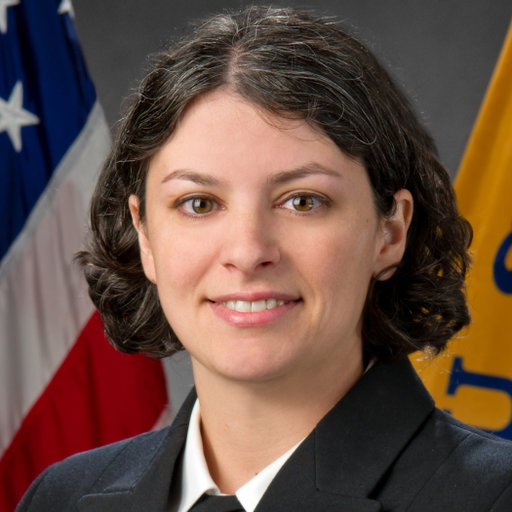
- Born: Cleveland Heights, Ohio, USA

Academic background
- Education: BA, history, 2006, George Washington University; MPH, epidemiology, 2010, Emory University; PhD, epidemiology, 2016, University of North Carolina at Chapel Hill
- Thesis: Are We Studying Who We Think We're Studying? Role of Socioeconomic Status in the Validity of Estimates of Pneumococcal Conjugate Vaccine Effectiveness in the United States (2016)

Academic work
- Institutions: Centers for Disease Control and Prevention

Ruth Link-Gelles is an American epidemiologist. She works for the United States Centers for Disease Control and Prevention (CDC) and serves as a Commander in the United States Public Health Service Commissioned Corps.

== Early life and education ==
Link-Gelles was born and raised in Cleveland Heights, Ohio, where she graduated from Cleveland Heights High School in 2002. Following her high school graduation, she enrolled at George Washington University for her Bachelor of Arts in history and her MPH in epidemiology from Emory University. Starting in 2010, Link-Gelles began working for the United States Centers for Disease Control and Prevention (CDC). While earning her PhD from the University of North Carolina at Chapel Hill, she accepted a position within the United States respiratory diseases branch within the CDC. She published her thesis in 2016 titled Are We Studying Who We Think We're Studying? Role of Socioeconomic Status in the Validity of Estimates of Pneumococcal Conjugate Vaccine Effectiveness in the United States. Following graduation, Link-Gelles received an award from Delta Omega, Theta chapter and joined the CDC's Epidemic Intelligence Service.

== Career ==
During her tenure with the CDC, Link-Gelles has helped fight against the Zika virus and COVID-19. In 2016, she travelled with a team of researchers to the U.S. territory of American Samoa to ensure babies born to Zika-infected mothers were tested for birth defects. Link-Gelles commissioned as a Lieutenant (O-3) in the United States Public Health Service Commissioned Corps (USPHS) in 2016. She later presented a study at the 2017 EIS Conference demonstrating that two-thirds of pregnant women with high viral loads of Hepatitis B go untreated. She was promoted to Lieutenant Commander (O-4) in 2020 and to Commander (O-5) in 2023.

During the COVID-19 pandemic, Link-Gelles published a study in the journal Morbidity and Mortality Weekly Report which analyzed the reopening of childcare centers in Rhode Island. She then went on the lead the Pharmacy Partnership for Long-Term Care program, a monumental effort by the CDC to rapidly deliver and administers COVID-19 vaccines to residents of long-term care (LTC) settings, such as nursing homes, assisted living communities, residential care communities, group homes and senior housing. For her efforts, she was awarded the Jan Thayer Pioneer Award by the National Center for Assisted Living and the USPHS Shalon M. Irving Junior Scientist of the Year Award.

== Personal life ==
In 2014 Link-Gelles married to Daniel Kovari, whom at the time was a post-doctoral researcher in the physics department at Emory University.

== Selected publications ==
- Effectiveness of 13-valent pneumococcal conjugate vaccine for prevention of invasive pneumococcal disease in children in the USA: a matched case-control study (2016)
- Effect of use of 13-valent pneumococcal conjugate vaccine in children on invasive pneumococcal disease in children and adults in the USA: analysis of multisite, population-based surveillance (2015)
- Serotype-specific changes in invasive pneumococcal disease after pneumococcal conjugate vaccine introduction: a pooled analysis of multiple surveillance sites (2013)
- Infection control assessment of ambulatory surgical centers (2010)
- Effectiveness of 2, 3, and 4 COVID-19 mRNA Vaccine Doses Among Immunocompetent Adults During Periods when SARS-CoV-2 Omicron BA.1 and BA.2/BA.2.12.1 Sublineages Predominated — VISION Network, 10 States, December 2021–June 2022 (2022)
