= Jon Vernick =

American academic

Jon S. Vernick is the co-director of the Center for Gun Policy and Research at the Johns Hopkins Bloomberg School of Public Health, as well as the deputy director of the Johns Hopkins Center for Injury Research and Policy. In 2013, he received the public service award from the Injury Control and Emergency Health Services section of the American Public Health Association.

== Education ==
Vernick received his J.D. cum laude from George Washington University in 1989 and his M.P.H. from the Johns Hopkins Bloomberg School of Public Health in 1994.
