= Stephen Teret =

Stephen P. Teret is Professor of Health Policy and Management at the Johns Hopkins Bloomberg School of Public Health, where he is also Associate Dean for Education and Faculty Development. He is also the director of the Johns Hopkins Center for Law and the Public's Health.

== Education ==
Teret received his J.D. from the Brooklyn Law School in 1969 and his M.P.H. from the Johns Hopkins Bloomberg School of Public Health in 1979.

== Career ==
Before enrolling in Johns Hopkins, Teret worked as a personal injury lawyer in upstate New York. He joined the Johns Hopkins faculty after receiving his M.P.H. from there in 1979. One of his former students at Johns Hopkins was Garen Wintemute. In 1995, Teret was the founding director of Johns Hopkins' Center for Gun Policy and Research, and served as director from then until 2001.

== Research ==
Teret has been studying gun violence and gun policy from a public health perspective since 1979. He is particularly well known for his work on smart guns, which he became interested after a baby whose family he knew was killed by another child with a gun.
