= Daniel Webster (academic) =

American health policy researcher

Daniel W. Webster
- Born: 1960 (age 65–66)
- Education: University of Michigan, Johns Hopkins Bloomberg School of Public Health
- Awards: Delta Omega Honorary Society in Public Health – Alpha chapter, faculty induction, 2005; Educator of the Year, Maryland Network Against Domestic Violence, 2004
- Scientific career
- Fields: Public health, health policy
- Workplaces: Johns Hopkins Bloomberg School of Public Health

Daniel W. Webster (born 1960) is an American health policy researcher and the distinguished research scholar of the Johns Hopkins Center for Gun Violence Solutions (formerly known as the Center for Gun Policy and Research) at Johns Hopkins Bloomberg School of Public Health. He is also the deputy director for research at the Johns Hopkins Center for the Prevention of Youth Violence, and the first Bloomberg Professor of American Health at the Johns Hopkins Bloomberg School of Public Health. In 2016, he became the director of the Johns Hopkins-Baltimore Collaborative for Violence Reduction, a joint crime-fighting effort between Johns Hopkins and the Baltimore Police Department.

== Education ==
Webster received his MPH from the University of Michigan in 1985 and his ScD from the Johns Hopkins Bloomberg School of Public Health in 1990. His ScD thesis was entitled, Determinants of pediatricians' firearm injury prevention counseling practices.

== Research ==
Webster is known for his research into gun violence and laws, and he has published numerous articles on these and related subjects. In 2015, he and his colleagues published a study that found that the passage of a permit-to-purchase (PTP) handgun law in Connecticut was associated with a 40% reduction in firearm homicides in the state in the ten years after the law's enactment in 1995. Later that year, Webster co-authored another study looking at changes in such laws in Connecticut and Missouri, the latter of which repealed its permit-to-purchase law in 2007.

This study found that the enactment of Connecticut's PTP law was associated with a 15.4% reduction in firearm suicide rates in the state, while Missouri's repeal of its PTP law was associated with a 16.1% increase in these rates. A previous study by Webster et al. had found that the repeal of Missouri's PTP law was associated with increased annual murders of 0.93 per 100,000 people, or about 55 to 63 per year. In October 2016, he and his Johns Hopkins colleagues released a report claiming that arguments in support of campus carry laws are based on flawed assumptions, and that such laws could make college campuses less safe.

== Views ==
Webster has said that gun laws, rather than focusing on making guns illegal, should focus on restricting access to guns with respect to those who are most likely to commit gun crimes. He has described gun violence as a public health issue, saying, "Like so many public health problems, you may have some communities or individuals with very low risk, but some communities where it truly is the most important public health problem that they have to deal with." He has also said that a 2013 law in Maryland that requires handgun buyers get a license from the police and pass a background check might be effective, but that as of September 2015, there is not enough data to say what its full effect is.
