= Ji Jiafu =

Chinese oncologist (born 1959)

- 季加孚
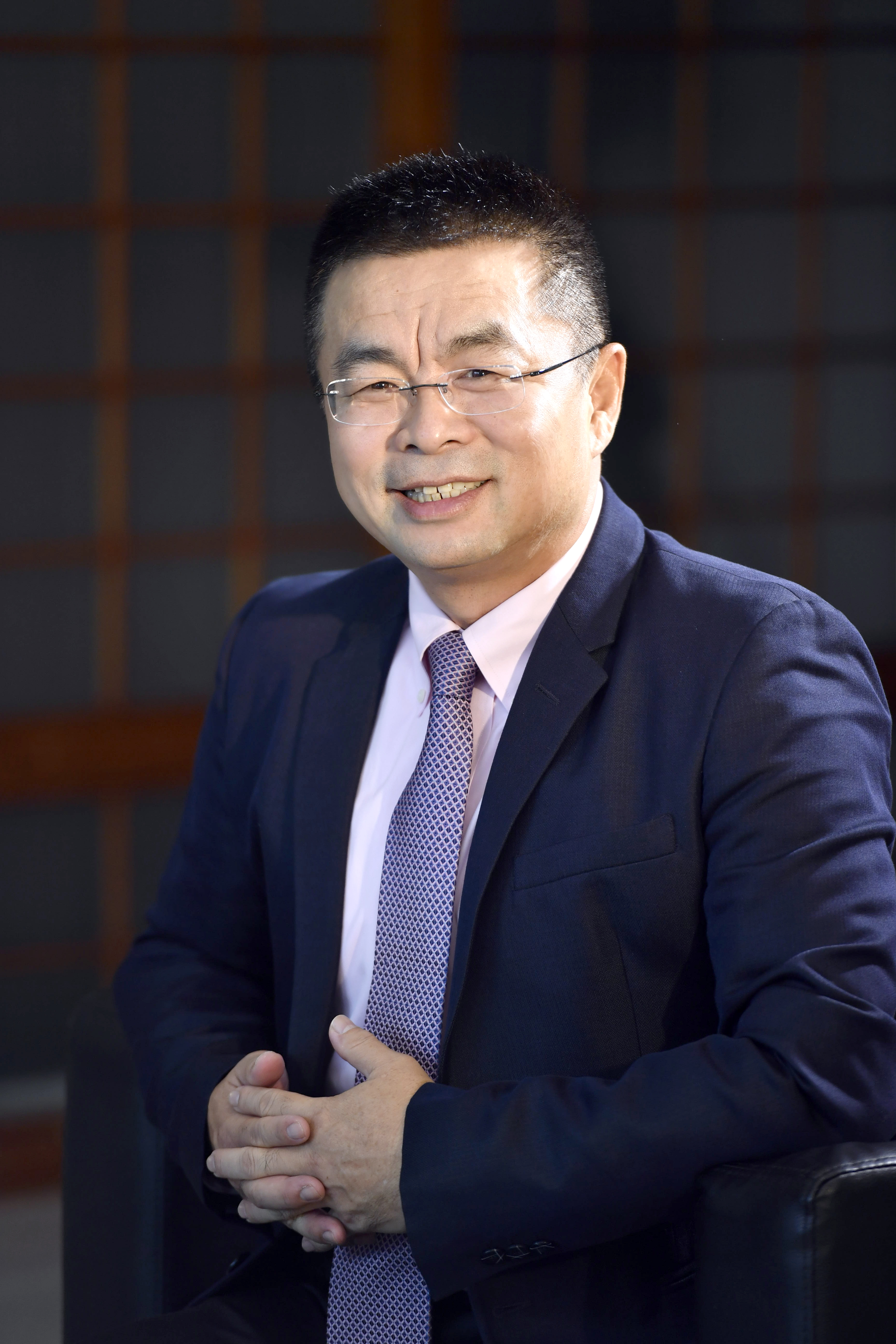
- Ji in 2016
- Born: December 1959 (age 66); Hohhot, Inner Mongolia, China
- Education: Inner Mongolia Medical College; Beijing Medical University; Cardiff University
- Occupation: Surgical oncologist
- Known for: Developing "key techniques in building an integrated system for the prevention and treatment of gastric cancer."

Ji Jiafu FACS, FRCS (Chinese: 季加孚; born 1959) is a Chinese surgical oncologist and researcher specializing in gastrointestinal malignancy. He is a professor in gastrointestinal surgery at Peking University, the director of the Key Laboratory in "Malignancy Pathogenesis and Translational Research" under the Ministry of Education of the People's Republic of China, a fellow of the Chinese Academy of the Medical Sciences (CAMS), an academician of the Chinese Academy of Engineering (CAE), and a recipient of the Special Government Allowances of the State Council.

Ji is most notable for his effort in promoting the standardization of gastric cancer treatment in China as well as his leading role in the construction of the world's largest gastric cancer biobank. He received the State Scientific and Technological Progress Award for his achievements.

Ji is currently serving as the council chairman of the Beijing Anti-Cancer Association. He is also an honorary president of the Beijing Association of Holistic Integrative Medicine. He served as the president of Peking University Cancer Hospital / School of Oncology & Beijing Institute for Cancer Research and vice president of the China Anti-Cancer Association. He was also the president of the International Gastric Cancer Association from 2017-2019.

== Biography ==
=== Early life and education ===
Ji Jiafu was born in December 1959 in Hohhot, Inner Mongolia.

In 1977, Ji took the first gaokao after the Cultural Revolution and was admitted to the Inner Mongolia Medical College; he graduated with a bachelor's degree in December 1982. He resumed study at the then Beijing Medical University from September 1987 to July 1990 and earned a master's degree in oncology.

Ji also studied abroad. As a postdoctoral fellow, he researched the gene expression profiles in multiple cancers (including human gastric cancer) at Stanford University in the U.S. from January 1999 to March 2000. Then, from January 2012 to October 2015, he studied oncology at Cardiff University in the U.K. and received a Ph.D. degree.

=== Career ===
Ji started working as a resident at the Affiliated Hospital of Inner Mongolia Medical University in 1982 immediately after his graduation. He left in 1987 for Beijing and became an associate professor of surgery in 1990 at the Peking University School of Oncology. In 2000, he was promoted to become a professor of surgery and the director of the Gastrointestinal Surgical Department / Gastrointestinal Cancer Center at the Peking University Cancer Hospital. In July 2011, Ji was appointed president of the Peking University Cancer Hospital / School of Oncology & Beijing Institute for Cancer Research, and in January 2013, director of the Key Laboratory in "Malignancy Pathogenesis and Translational Research" under the Ministry of Education of the People's Republic of China; his term as the president ended in June 2022.

In 1996, Ji initiated the construction of the Peking University Cancer Hospital Gastric Cancer Biobank. By 2019, the biobank had stored more than two million samples and contributed to 104 research projects, including the International Cancer Genome Consortium.

From 2006 to 2014, Ji participated in the capecitabine and oxaliplatin adjuvant study in stomach cancer (CLASSIC) study, in which he was the principal investigator for the Chinese subgroup. His results showed that in patients with advanced gastric cancer, the adjuvant capecitabine and oxaliplatin (CAPOX) chemotherapy increased the 3-year disease-free survival rate after gastrectomy with D2 lymphadenectomy (Note: Gastrectomy with D2 lymphadenectomy (or D2 gastrectomy) is the standard surgery performed for patients with advanced gastric cancer in Asia. It is named so because it includes the dissection of all the Group 1 and Group 2 lymph nodes around the stomach.) from 56% to 78%, hence establishing CAPOX as the preferred option of peri-operative treatment for gastric cancer in China.

In 2008, Ji introduced a "modularized" version of D2 gastrectomy. In his own words, the modularized gastrectomy "dissembles the procedure into 12 ordered modules, each with standardized operational steps, making the surgery a safe and standard process." He has since been promoting such an approach across China, and by 2019, the nationwide mortality rate of D2 gastrectomy had decreased to 0.24%.

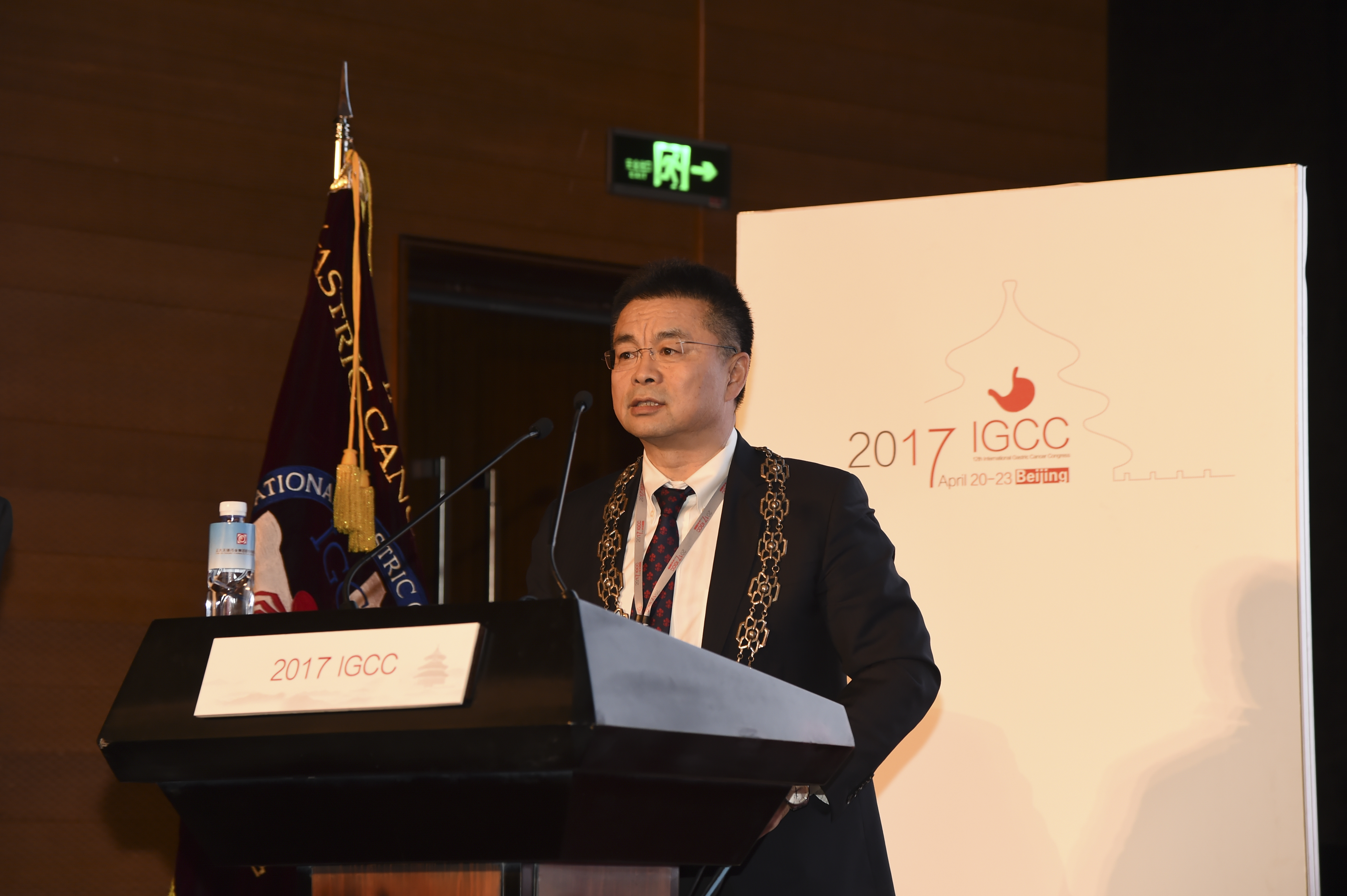
Ji Jiafu at the 2017 IGCC

In 2015, Ji was elected the Congress President of the International Gastric Cancer Association (IGCA), hence held the 12th International Gastric Cancer Congress (IGCC) in Beijing, China on April 20–23, 2017. The congress was a great success: there were 3,816 participants from 48 countries across the world, and 1,245 abstracts had been submitted including 99 oral presentations and 540 posters. Ji subsequently became the President of IGCA. During his term (2017-2019), Ji advocated for his modularized gastrectomy on a global level and shared his experiences with surgeons from different countries; he also helped with the founding of the European Sub-Association of IGCA.

In 2017, Ji was awarded the Second Class State Scientific and Technological Progress Award for developing "key techniques in building an integrated system for the prevention and treatment of gastric cancer."

In 2019, Ji completed the world's first phase III randomized controlled trial on laparoscopic D2 gastrectomy and published his results on JAMA.

In 2022, Ji became a fellow of the CAMS.

In 2025, Ji was elected an academician of the CAE.

== Political views ==
Ji Jiafu is a member of the China Democratic League and currently a member of the party's central committee. He is also serving as a member of the National Committee of the Chinese People's Political Consultative Conference (CPPCC) (2018-) and was a member of the Beijing CPPCC (2003-2018).

== Honours and awards ==
- 2025, Academician of Chinese Academy of Engineering
- 2024, Guanghua Engineering Science and Technology Prize
- 2022, Fellowship of the Chinese Academy of the Medical Sciences
- 2022, Membership in the Alpha chapter of the Delta Omega Society
- 2020, Ho Leung Ho Lee Foundation Award, Medical and Pharmaceutical Award
- 2019, Sino Phil Asia International Peace Award
- 2018, Alumni Awards, Professional Achievement Award
- 2017, State Scientific and Technological Progress Award, Second Class
- 2017, Beijing Scholar
- 2016, Outstanding Achievement Award for Scientific Research in Colleges and Universities (Science and Technology Advancement Award) of the Ministry of Education of the People's Republic of China, First Class
- 2016, China Medical Science and Technology Award, First Class
- 2015, WuXi PharmaTech Life Science and Chemistry Awards, Outstanding Achievements Award
- 2014, Wu Jieping-Paul Janssen Medical - Pharmaceutical Award
- 2013, Science and Technology Award of Chinese Anti-Cancer Association, First Class
- 2012, Beijing Municipal Science and Technology Award, Third Class

== Selected bibliography ==
- Sijin Cheng, Ziyi Li, Ranran Gao, ... Zhaode Bu#, and Jiafu Ji#, Zemin Zhang#. Accepted. A pan-cancer single-cell landscape of tumor-infiltrating myeloid cells. Cell. 2021 Feb 04;184(3).https://doi.org/10.1016/j.cell.2021.01.010 (As correspondence author)
- Zhang, X., Liang, H., Li, Z., Xue, Y., Wang, Y., Zhou, Z., . . . Ji, J#. Perioperative or Postoperative Adjuvant OXALIPLATIN with S-1 VERSUS Adjuvant OXALIPLATIN WITH CAPECITABINE in patients with locally Advanced gastric or gastro-oesophageal junction Adenocarcinoma undergoing D2 Gastrectomy (resolve): An Open-label, superiority AND NON-INFERIORITY, Phase 3 randomised controlled trial. Lancet Oncol. 2021 Jul 9. https://doi.org/10.1016/S1470-2045(21)00297-7
- Li Z, Gao X, Peng X,... Liang H, and Ji J#. Multi-omics characterization of molecular features of gastric cancer correlated with response to neoadjuvant chemotherapy. Sci Adv. 2020 Feb 26;6(9). https://doi.org/10.1126/sciadv.aay4211 (As correspondence author)
- Yin S, Xi R, Wu A,... Li Z, and J. Ji#, and J. Xi#. Patient-derived tumor-like cell clusters for drug testing in cancer therapy. Science Translational Medicine, 2020 Jun 24;12(549). https://doi.org/10.1126/scitranslmed.aaz1723 (As correspondence author)
- Yu J, Huang C, Sun Y,... Chen P, and Ji J#, Li G#. Effect of Laparoscopic vs Open Distal Gastrectomy on 3-Year Disease-Free Survival in Patients With Locally Advanced Gastric Cancer: The CLASS-01 Randomized Clinical Trial. JAMA. 2019 May 28; 321(20):1983-1992. https://doi.org/10.1001/jama.2019.5359 (As correspondence author)
- Li Z, Shan F, Ying X,... Su X, and Ji J#. Assessment of Laparoscopic Distal Gastrectomy After Neoadjuvant Chemotherapy for Locally Advanced Gastric Cancer: A Randomized Clinical Trial. JAMA Surg. 2019 Dec 1;154(12):1093-1101. https://doi.org/10.1001/jamasurg.2019.3473 (As correspondence author)
- Dong D, Tang L, Li ZY,... and Tian J#, Ji J#. Development and validation of an individualized nomogram to identify occult peritoneal metastasis in patients with advanced gastric cancer. Ann Oncol. 2019 Mar 1;30(3):431-438. https://doi.org/10.1093/annonc/mdz001 (As correspondence author)
- Xing R, Zhou Y, Yu J,... Ji J#, Fang X#, and Lu Y#. Whole-genome sequencing reveals novel tandem-duplication hotspots and a prognostic mutational signature in gastric cancer. Nat Commun. 2019 May 2; 10(1):2037. https://doi.org/10.1038/s41467-019-09644-6 (As correspondence author)
- Zong L, Abe M, Seto Y, Ji J#. The challenge of screening for early gastric cancer in China. Lancet. 2016 Nov 26;388(10060):2606. https://doi.org/10.1016/S0140-6736(16)32226-7 (As correspondence author)
- Sullivan R, Alatise OI, Anderson BO,... Ji JF,... Wu YL, Zeiton M, and Purushotham A. Global cancer surgery: delivering safe, affordable, and timely cancer surgery. Lancet Oncol. 2015 Sep;16(11):1193-224. https://doi.org/10.1016/s1470-2045(15)00223-5 (As China's key deputy of Global Cancer Surgery program)
- Bang YJ, Kim YW, Yang HK,... Kim YH, Ji J, Yeh TS, Button P, Sirzén F, and Noh SH; CLASSIC trial investigators. Adjuvant capecitabine and oxaliplatin for gastric cancer after D2 gastrectomy (CLASSIC): a phase 3 open-label, randomized controlled trial. Lancet. 2012 Jan 28;379(9813):315-21. https://doi.org/10.1016/S0140-6736(11)61873-4 (As the principal investigator in China.)
