= Center for Gun Policy and Research =

Research center at the Johns Hopkins Bloomberg School of Public Health

Coordinates: 39.298023°N 76.590183°W

The Center for Gun Violence Solutions (formerly known as the Center for Gun Policy and Research) is a research and advocacy center at the Johns Hopkins Bloomberg School of Public Health dedicated to researching and advancing effective approaches to reduce gun violence in the United States. The center's current co-directors are Joshua Horwitz and Cassandra Crifasi.

== History ==
The Center for Gun Violence Solutions was formally established in 1995 as the Center for Gun Violence Prevention and Policy, with Stephen Teret as founding director. Teret served as the center's director from 1995 to 2001. The Center was the first to study gun violence as a public health emergency rather than strictly a criminal justice issue.

In 2022, the Center merged with the Educational Fund to Stop Gun Violence, a non-profit organization founded in 1978 that used public health principles to pursue policy development, advocacy and community collaboration.

== Faculty and Staff ==
In addition to Crifasi and Horwitz, other notable Center for Gun Violence Solutions members include former co-directors Daniel Webster and Jon Vernick, Jacquelyn Campbell, Lori Haas, Shannon Frattaroli, Katherine Hoops, Paul Nestadt, Elizabeth Stuart.

== Funding ==
The Center for Gun Violence Solutions receives and/or has received funding from, among other sources, The Annie E. Casey Foundation, The David Bohnett Foundation, The David and Lucile Packard Foundation, The Funders' Collaborative for Gun Violence Prevention, The John D. and Catherine T. MacArthur Foundation, The Joyce Foundation, The Overbrook Foundation, The Richard and Rhoda Goldman Fund, Bloomberg Philanthropies, and The Harold Simmons Foundation. The center's website, as well as Webster, have said that the research conducted there is done independently of any funding source.
