= Annals of Epidemiology =

- Discipline: Epidemiology
- Language: English

Publication details
- History: 1990–present
- Publisher: Elsevier
- Frequency: Monthly
- Open access: Hybrid
- Impact factor: 5.6 (2022)

Standard abbreviations
- ISO 4: Ann. Epidemiol.

Indexing
- ISSN: 1047-2797

Links
- Journal homepage

The Annals of Epidemiology is a monthly peer-reviewed journal devoted to epidemiological research and is published as the official journal for American College of Epidemiology. The journal was established in 1990 and is published by Elsevier. Its Editor-in-Chief is Dr. Patrick Sullivan (Emory University). According to the Journal Citation Reports, the journal has a 2022 impact factor of 5.6.
