= Louise Charbonneau (judge) =

Canadian judge

Louis Charbonneau

Chief Justice of the Supreme Court of the Northwest Territories
- In office October 1, 2018 – July 11, 2022
- Preceded by: Herself as Senior Judge of the Supreme Court of the Northwest Territories
- Succeeded by: Shannon Smallwood

Louise A. Charbonneau is a Canadian jurist and the former Chief Justice of the Supreme Court of the Northwest Territories. She was appointed before 2012.
