= Delta Omega =

Public health college honorary society

- ΔΩ
- Founded: May 14, 1924; 102 years ago Johns Hopkins University
- Type: Honor
- Affiliation: Independent
- Status: Active
- Emphasis: Public Health
- Scope: International
- Colors: Black and Gold
- Symbol: Triangle
- Chapters: 133
- Members: 20,000+ lifetime
- Headquarters: PO Box 2406; Arlington County, Virginia 22202; United States
- Website: deltaomega.org

Delta Omega Society (ΔΩ) is an international honor society for studies in public health. It was founded in 1924 at the Bloomberg School of Public Health at Johns Hopkins University in Baltimore, Maryland. The society has chartered 133 chapters.

== History ==
Delta Omega was founded in 1924 by two graduate students at the Bloomberg School of Public Health at Johns Hopkins University. The founders were Edgar Erskine Hume and Claude W. Mitchell.

The idea for Delta Omega came while sharing the daily commute between Baltimore and Washington, D.C. Both men sought to elevate the relatively young profession of public health to a level similar to other professions, and as such, it should have a fraternity of its own. Hume was the first to insist that the fraternity be honorary, and while Mitchell had originally suggested a social basis, he soon agreed with his friend that the groups should be formed as an honor society. They consulted with members of other fraternities and health experts in other fields.

A group of seventeen students, one faculty member, and one alumnus were chosen to become the charter members of the Johns Hopkins chapter. The charter members were Charles A. Bailey, Milford E. Barnes, Yves M. Biraud, James B. Black, John W. Brown, James Angus Doull, Thurber Fales, Martin Frobisher Jr., Raymond D. Fear, John F. Kendrick, Shelton S. King, Edward A. Lane, Hilario Lara, Hynek J. Pelc, Persis Putnam, George H. Ramsey, and William Henry Welch. This group formed committees to work out the constitution and symbolism. A constitution was ratified on May 14, 1924.

Expansion began within the first year. Upon return from the summer recess, Hume reported success around the East Coast, while Richard Bolt, a charter member, worked to organize groups in the West. By the October 15, 1924 meeting, chapters were approved at Harvard University (Beta chapter) and MIT (Gamma chapter). Soon, these would be followed by the University of Michigan (Delta chapter) and Yale University (Epsilon chapter). Expansion and growth continued quickly despite some growing pains due to the fast pace. The first California chapter, at the University of California (Zeta chapter), effectively spanned the nation by March 1926.

Delta Omega's activities were severely constrained during World War II and were suspended between 1942 and 1944 because of wartime priorities. However, additional pressure came from organizational disagreements. At the time, Delta Omega offered membership only after completion of a year of residency. This effectively resulted in control of the society becoming vested in faculty membership. At Johns Hopkins University, the activities of the fraternity were in some cases duplicative of those offered by the school itself. A debate ensued concerning the fact that some members, soon after the election, would resign from the practice of public health on an official level to go into private practice. Founder Mitchell, who had led the Alpha chapter, resigned from his leadership position when he left for private practice. The result of this debate, explained further in the Fraternity's History, was to suspend operations at Alpha chapter, which would not resume at the school until 1978. The other chapters sputtered along. In 1948, a revitalization was sparked, but it took time, and some chapters did not re-emerge. The lecture series was expanded in the 1960s and 1970s. But it appears that it took the revitalization of the Alpha chapter in 1978 to spark a new round of expansion that continues to the present day.

As of 2025, there are more than 20,000 members from over 130 chapters throughout the United States, Puerto Rico, the Caribbean, Beirut, and Taiwan. The society's mission is to promote excellence in contributing to the field of public health and advancing the health of people in every aspect.

== Symbols ==
Delta Omega's emblem is a circular gold key with the Greek letters ΔΩ engraved vertically. Its colors are black and gold. Its stole is peach, with a black binding and lettering.

== Membership ==
Delta Omega has regular and honorary members. Regular members include students, faculty, and alumni of institutions with chapters. Honorary members are inducted by the national officers.

Membership in Delta Omega reflects the dedication of an individual to quality in the field of public health and to the protection and advancement of the health of all people. Election to the society is based on outstanding performance, including scholarship in students, teaching and research in faculty members, and community service in alumni. Election to membership in Delta Omega is intended not only to recognize merit, but also to encourage further excellence in, and devotion to, public health work.

Each chapter must be associated with a Council on Education for Public Health (CEPH)- accredited school and is limited to inducting no more than 20% of the graduating student body and ten percent of undergraduates. GPA requirements are up to each chapter; historically, each inductee has been in the top 25% of their class for academic performance. Public health faculty and alumni may also be inducted, but no more than 3% of faculty may be inducted from one program.

== Activities ==
Delta Omega hosts a national student poster competition, honoring exceptional student research, and a national curriculum award, to honor innovative public health curricula. Each year the selected poster presenters are allowed to present their award-winning research at the Delta Omega/American Public Health Association (meeting. The curriculum award winners also present their work at the annual meeting.

During National Public Health Week, Delta Omega's hold an annual day of service, coordinated at the chapter level. It also hosts a monthly professional webinar series to provide professional development for its members. The society identifies and reprints classic works in public health; it also shared these works on its website.

== Governance ==
Delta Omega is governed by its national officers, who are elected by representatives from its active chapters at an annual meeting, including president, immediate-past president, two to four members-at-large, and a president-elect who serves as treasurer and executive secretary. The society also has a national council that consists of its national officers and a representative from each active chapter. The society's annual business meeting is held in conjunction with the meeting of the American Public Health Association.

Delta Omega's national headquarters are in Arlington, Virginia.

== Chapters ==
Delta Omega has chartered more than 130 chapters, most of which remain active.

== See also ==
- Professional degrees of public health
- Professional fraternities and sororities
- Professional Further Education in Clinical Pharmacy and Public Health
