= Allison E. Aiello =

American epidemiologist

- Born: 1972 (age 53–54)
- Occupation: Epidemiologist
- Known for: Research on Aging, Epigenetics, Alzheimer's Disease, Related Dementias, Social Epidemiology, Infectious Diseases
- Awards: aiX Faculty Fellowship, Columbia University (2026); Carol J. Rowland Hogue Award for Outstanding Mid-Career Achievement in Epidemiology, Society for Epidemiologic Research (2019); John G. Searle Assistant Professorship of Public Health, University of Michigan (2009); Anna C. Gelman Award, Columbia University Mailman School of Public Health (2004)

Academic background
- Education: BS, Environmental Sciences, 1995, University of Massachusetts Amherst; MS, Environmental Sciences, 1998, UNC Gillings School of Global Public Health; PhD, Epidemiology, 2003, Columbia University Mailman School of Public Health
- Website: www.publichealth.columbia.edu/research-labs/aiello-lab

Allison Elizabeth Aiello is the James S. Jackson Healthy Longevity Professor of Epidemiology in the Robert N. Butler Columbia Aging Center, with tenure, at the Columbia University Mailman School of Public Health. She is also the deputy director of the Robert N. Butler Columbia Aging Center, a university-wide center. Aiello's research examines how economic, psychological, and biological factors shape healthy longevity, cognitive function, and the development of Alzheimer's disease. Her work focuses on how stressful experiences across the life course influence biological aging, particularly immune system aging (immunosenescence), as a pathway linking stress and health across the aging process.

== Education ==
Aiello was born in 1972. She earned a Bachelor of Science in environmental sciences from the University of Massachusetts Amherst in 1995 and a Master of Science in environmental sciences from the UNC Gillings School of Global Public Health in 1998. She received a PhD in epidemiology with distinction from the Columbia University Mailman School of Public Health in 2003, and in 2004 received Columbia's Anna C. Gelman Award for outstanding achievement and promise in the field of epidemiology.

== Career ==
From 2003 to 2005, Aiello was a Robert Wood Johnson Foundation Health and Society Scholar at the University of Michigan. She became an assistant professor of epidemiology there in 2005, was named the John G. Searle Assistant Professor of Public Health in 2009, and became an associate professor in 2010. During this time, she and Arnold Monto led a Centers for Disease Control and Prevention-funded study of the feasibility and effectiveness of non-pharmaceutical interventions in reducing the spread of influenza. The study examined whether wearing surgical masks and using hand sanitizer could prevent the spread of influenza and other respiratory illnesses among university students. A later trial, eX-FLU, tested the effect of short-term isolation from social networks on respiratory infection transmission among university students. Her research on hand hygiene, mask use, and staying home while ill has contributed to national and international guidelines on pandemic preparedness and hand hygiene.

She also collaborated with Jennifer Dowd on the social patterning of persistent infections and immune response. They reported that socioeconomic status was associated with immune response to latent infection in the US population. Aiello's later work linked immune response to infection with outcomes including depression, Alzheimer's disease, and cognitive impairment, and suggested that lower socioeconomic status may influence mental health through stress-related alterations in immunity and inflammation.

In 2014, Aiello joined the faculty of the Gillings School of Global Public Health at the University of North Carolina at Chapel Hill as a professor of epidemiology, where she led the Social Epidemiology Program and directed graduate studies in epidemiology. She was elected a fellow of the Carolina Population Center and held an adjunct appointment in the Department of Social Medicine at the UNC School of Medicine. In 2018, Aiello received a five-year, $3.5 million National Institute on Minority Health and Health Disparities grant to examine the impact of psychosocial exposures upon cardiometabolic and mental health. As part of this work, her team studied DNA methylation in relation to life-course psychosocial stressors among participants. In 2019, she received the Carol J. Rowland Hogue Mid-career Achievement Award from the Society for Epidemiologic Research, which recognizes a mid-career scientist who has made "an exceptional contribution to the practice of epidemiology".

During the COVID-19 pandemic, her earlier findings on mask use and hand hygiene were drawn on by U.S. health agencies and the World Health Organization in their COVID-19 mitigation recommendations. She also worked with the North Carolina Department of Health and Human Services to assess how widespread mild and asymptomatic COVID-19 cases were in the state and to monitor the prevalence of the disease over time.

In 2022, Aiello moved to Columbia University to develop and lead the Program on Biosocial Aging and Health Equity in the Columbia Aging Center, and was appointed the James S. Jackson Healthy Longevity Professor of Epidemiology. She was granted tenure in July 2023. She has served as deputy director of the National Longitudinal Study of Adolescent to Adult Health (Add Health) since Wave VI, working with director Robert Hummer at the University of North Carolina at Chapel Hill. Add Health began in 1994 as a study of adolescent health and has followed its participants into adulthood; it is funded by the National Institutes of Health.

Aiello led the development of the Add Health Cognitive Assessment, Physical and Sensory Function protocol ("Add CAPS"), designed to identify early risk factors for Alzheimer's disease as participants reached early midlife. Using digital assessments, Add CAPS collected neurocognitive data from nearly 12,000 participants in early midlife, forming a nationally representative US dataset. She also directed the collection of physical and sensory function measures in Add Health, which are early indicators of cognitive decline. In 2026, she received Columbia's aiX Faculty Fellowship, a program funded by a grant from Google and co-sponsored by the university's Data Science Institute and Center for Teaching and Learning, in connection with a new course on generative AI for epidemiologists.
