= Epidemiologic Reviews =

Peer reviewed journal on public health

- Discipline: Epidemiology
- Language: English
- Edited by: David Celentano

Publication details
- History: 1979-present
- Publisher: Oxford University Press on behalf of the Johns Hopkins Bloomberg School of Public Health
- Frequency: Annually
- Impact factor: 6.222 (2020)

Standard abbreviations
- ISO 4: Epidemiol. Rev.

Indexing
- CODEN: EPIRD7
- ISSN: 0193-936X (print); 1478-6729 (web)
- LCCN: 79007564
- OCLC no.: 476308479

Links
- Journal homepage; Online access; Online archive

Epidemiologic Reviews is an annual peer-reviewed scientific journal covering epidemiology and published by Oxford University Press on behalf of the Johns Hopkins Bloomberg School of Public Health. The Journal was established in 1979 by Neal Nathanson and Philip E. Sartwell. The longest running editor-in-chief was Haroutune Armenian. The current editor-in-chief is David Celentano of the Johns Hopkins Bloomberg School of Public Health.

== History ==
The Journal was established by Neal Nathanson, with Philip Sartwell and the help of the editorial staff at the American Journal of Epidemiology.

During the initial period, primarily headed by Nathanson, the Journal established its credibility by soliciting pieces from well-respected epidemiologists and researchers that had also or were in the process of contributing to the American Journal of Epidemiology. The topics broke down equally under "three general topics: infectious diseases, other conditions, and general topics related to both," according to Sartwell in his introduction of the Journal in its first volume.

In 1985, Moyses Szklo took over as editor-in-chief. After Szklo, the Journal was led by Haroutune K. Armenian, the longest serving editor-in-chief to date. Armenian regularly obtained advice from Leon Gordis and Jon Samet. In 1999, the Journal separated from being a single 200+ page annual issue into two 100-page biannual issues, with the first one focusing on themes popular to public health and the second one focused on methodology. The following year, the Journal switched publishers from the Johns Hopkins University Press to the Oxford University Press. In 2003, the Journal reverted to publishing once per year.

Though Armenian began working with Michel A. Ibrahim as co-editor-in-chief starting in 2003, Ibrahim's leadership did not fully commence until 2005 after Armenian had officially retired from his position. In 2018, Dr. Ibrahim brought aboard David Celentano as the co-editor, and in 2019, Dr. Celentano became the editor-in-chief.

== Abstracting and Indexing ==
The Journal is abstracted and indexed in:

- BIOSIS Previews
- CAB Abstracts
- CINAHL
- Current Contents/Life Sciences
- EMBASE
- Global Health
- Index medicus/MEDLINE/PubMed
- Science Citation Index
- Tropical Diseases Bulletin
- World Agricultural Economics and Rural Sociology Abstracts

According to the Journal Citation Reports, the journal has a 2020 impact factor of 6.222, ranking it 20th out of 203 journals in the category "Public, Environmental & Occupational Health".

== Editors-in-chief ==
The following persons have been editor-in-chief of the journal:

- Philip E. Sartwell (1979–1982)
- Neal Nathanson (1979–1984)
- Moyses Szklo (1985–1988)
- Haroutune Armenian (1989–2004)
- Michel A. Ibrahim (2003–2018)
- David Celentano (2019–present)
