= Moyses Szklo =

Brazilian epidemiologist

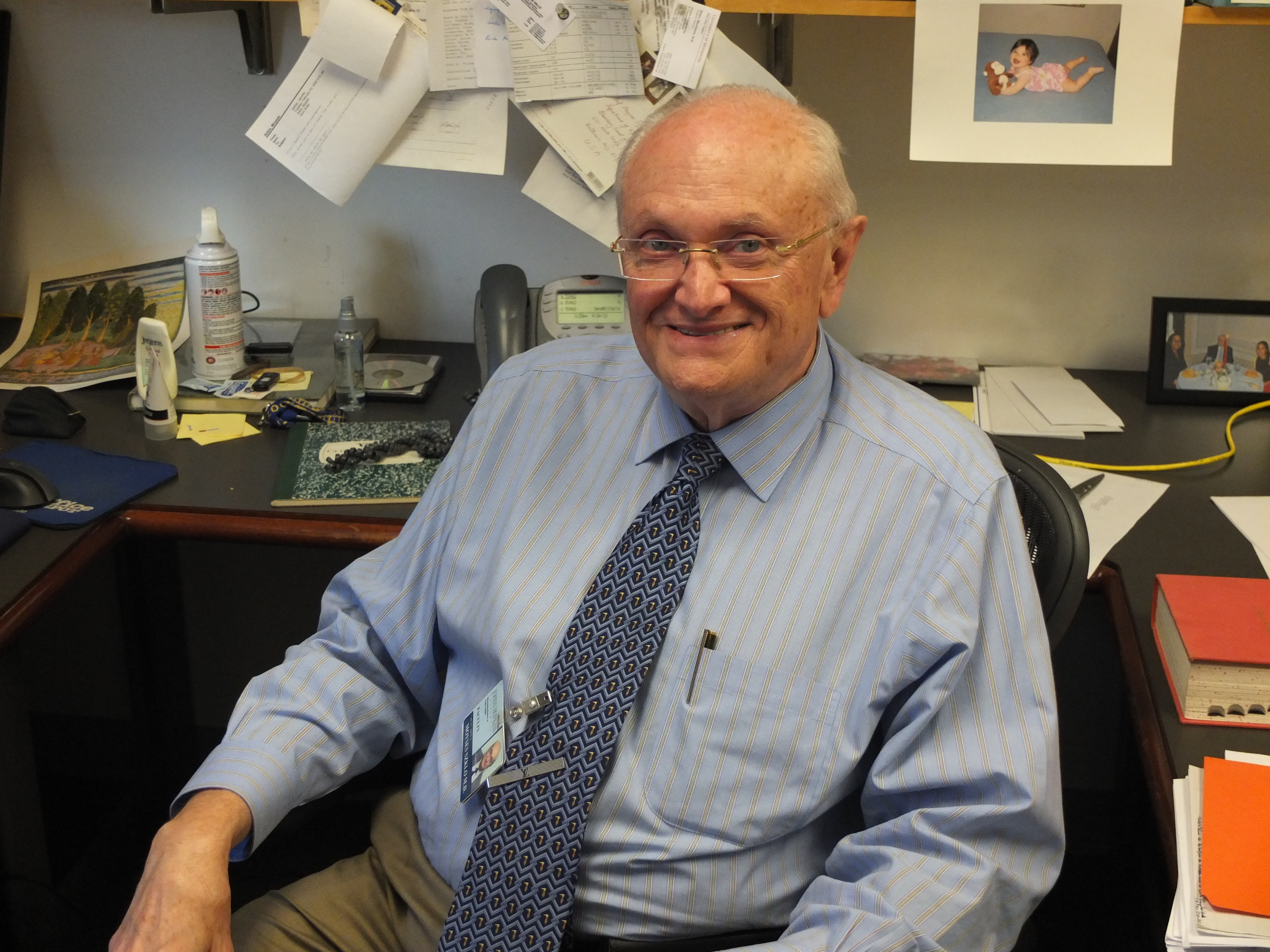
- Szklo sitting at his desk at JHU
- Born: Rio de Janeiro, Brazil
- Employer: Johns Hopkins University
- Notable work: American Journal of Epidemiology

Moyses Szklo is a Brazilian epidemiologist and physician scientist. He is currently University Distinguished Service Professor of Epidemiology and Medicine at the Johns Hopkins University, editor-in-chief emeritus of the American Journal of Epidemiology, and director of the Johns Hopkins Summer Institute of Epidemiology and Biostatistics. Szklo has published over 300 articles in peer-reviewed journals as well as a major textbook of epidemiology. He has led several major epidemiologic societies and studies and has been lecturing and leading courses all over the world, including Spain, Italy, Israel, Brazil, and Mexico.

== Early life and education ==
Moyses Szklo is a native of Rio de Janeiro, Brazil. Szklo received his medical degree from the Medical Sciences School at Rio de Janeiro State University in 1963. He then went to pursue an education at the Johns Hopkins University School of Hygiene and Public Health, where he studied the natural history and etiology of cardiovascular diseases. He received his master of public health from the school in 1972 and his doctor of public health in 1974.

== Career ==
Szklo has been a member of the Johns Hopkins University faculty since 1975. He is currently a Professor in the Department of Epidemiology, with a joint appointment in the Department of Medicine at Johns Hopkins University. He is the editor-in-chief of the American Journal of Epidemiology. He is also a co-author of a textbook, Epidemiology: Beyond the Basics, which is now on its fourth edition. He is the director of the Johns Hopkins Summer Institute of Epidemiology and Biostatistics. Szklo was the former principal investigator on two cohort studies of sub-clinical and clinical cardiovascular diseases, the Atherosclerosis Risk in Communities Study (ARIC) and the Multi-Ethnic Study of Atherosclerosis (MESA). He is currently the principal investigator of the Study of Cardiovascular Risk in Adolescents, a study in Brazil. He was awarded the title, "Commander of the Brazilian Government" by the Brazilian President.

== Honors and awards ==
- 1968–1969 Fellow, World Health Organization
- 1971–1974 Institutional Fellow, Pan American Health Organization
- 1979 "Golden Apple Award", presented by the Student Assembly of The Johns Hopkins University School of Hygiene and Public Health, for excellence in teaching
- 1980 Member of the Alpha chapter of the Delta Omega Honorary Society
- 1981 Fellow, American College of Epidemiology (elected)
- 1983 Fellow, American Epidemiological Society (elected)
- 1984 Fellow, American Heart Association, Council on Epidemiology (elected)
- 1984 Visiting Scientist, National Research Council in Brazil
- 1984 Visiting Scientist, National Health Institute in Italy
- 1984 Visiting Scientist, Palermo University in Italy
- 1988–1989 President, Society for Epidemiologic Research
- 1991 Visiting Scientist, National Health Institute in Italy
- 1996 "Golden Apple Award", presented by the Student Assembly of The Johns Hopkins University School of Hygiene and Public Health, for excellence in teaching
- 1996–1997 Chairman of the Epidemiology Section, American Public Health Association
- 1996–1997 Member, Cardio-respiratory Council, Johns Hopkins University School of Medicine
- 2001 Honorary Vice President for the U.S. American Public Health Association
- 2001 Ernest Lyman Award for excellence in educational activities, Bloomberg School of Public Health, The Johns Hopkins University
- 2002 Foreign member, Brazilian National Academy of Medicine (elected)
- 2002 Abraham Lilienfeld Award conferred by the Epidemiology Section, American Public Health Association, for contributions to the teaching of Epidemiology
- 2011 Physician's Merit Medal from the Brazilian Government
- 2012 Merit award, Surveillance Division, Brazilian Ministry of Health
- 2013 Brazilian Academy of Sciences, member (elected)
- 2013 Cutter Lecture Speaker, Harvard University (invited)
- 2013 Robert S. Gordon Lectureship Award, NIH (invited)
