= Henry Mosley =

Henry Mosley may refer to:

- Henry Mosley (cricketer)
- Henry Mosley (bishop)
- Henry Mosley (epidemiologist)

== See also ==
- Henry Moseley (disambiguation)
