= Epidemiology (disambiguation) =

Epidemiology is the study of the distribution and patterns of health-events, health-characteristics and their causes or influences in defined populations.

Epidemiology may also refer to:

- Epidemiology (journal)
- Epidemiology (Community), episode of the television series Community
