= Monto (disambiguation) =

Monto was a red light district in Dublin, Ireland

Monto may also refer to:

== People ==
- Arnold Monto
- Mika Monto
- Raymond Rocco Monto
- Pen name of Lauri Soininen, Finnish journalist and poet

== Other ==
- Monto, Queensland, town in Australia
- Shire of Monto, Australia
