= Catherine Troisi =

American epidemiologist

- Education: University of Rochester (BA); Michigan State University (MS); University of Michigan (PhD)
- Scientific career
- Fields: Epidemiology, infectious diseases, leadership studies
- Workplaces: Baylor College of Medicine; UTHealth School of Public Health
- Thesis: Influenza type c: antibody detection and epidemiology (1980)
- Doctoral advisor: Arnold Monto
- Other academic advisors: Steven Aust; H.F. Maassab

Catherine Lynne Troisi is an American epidemiologist specializing in leadership studies and infectious diseases including HIV and hepatitis. She is an tenured professor in the divisions of management, policy, and community health and epidemiology at UTHealth School of Public Health and Director of Workforce Development for the Texas Epidemic Public Health Institute.

== Education ==
Troisi completed a B.A. in chemistry from University of Rochester in 1974. She earned a M.S. in biochemistry from Michigan State University in 1975. Her master's thesis focused on the biochemical effects of polybrominated biphenyls on microsomal enzymes. Steven Aust was chair of her thesis committee. Troisi completed a Ph.D. in epidemiological sciences from University of Michigan in 1980. Her dissertation was titled Influenza type c: antibody detection and epidemiology. Arnold Monto and H.F. Maassab chaired her dissertation committee.

== Career and research ==
Troisi was an assistant professor in the department of virology and epidemiology at Baylor College of Medicine from 1983 to 1991. She joined the faculty at UTHealth School of Public Health in 1997. In 2010, Troisi was promoted to tenured associate professor in the divisions of management, policy, and community health and epidemiology. She is the coordinator of the leadership studies concentration and teaches courses on public health. Troisi researches infectious disease epidemiology with a focus on HIV and hepatitis. In addition to her academic career, Troisi has practiced public health at the Houston Health Department, serving as Bureau Chief for HIV/STD/Viral Hepatitis Prevention, Assistant Director of the Communicable Disease Prevention and Control Division, and lastly, as Director of the Office of Public Health Practice. Troisi is active in the American Public Health Association, having served as Chair of the Action Board, Co-chair of the Joint Policy Committee, and elected member of the Executive Board. She currently serves on the APHA Science Board. Troisi is also a Board Member of the International Network of Epidemiology in Policy and a member of the epidemiology work group of the National Association of County and City Health Officials among other public health organizations.

In 2020, Troisi explained to the public about the 2020 coronavirus pandemic in Texas.
