= George Comstock =

George Comstock may refer to:

- George Comstock (astronomer) (1855–1934), American astronomer and educator
- George F. Comstock (1811–1892), American lawyer and politician
- George W. Comstock (1915–2007), American public health physician, epidemiologist and educator
