= George W. Comstock =

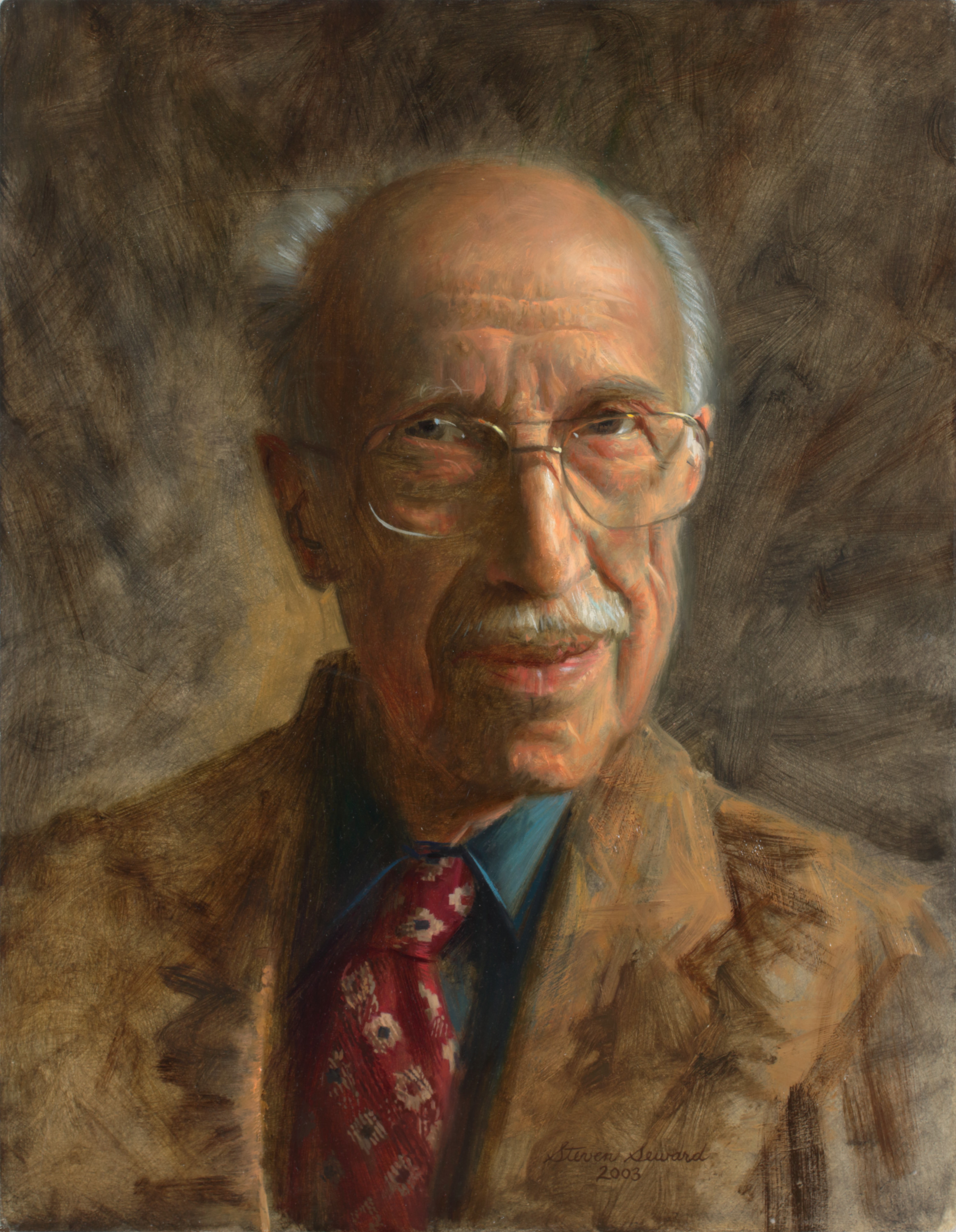
- Portrait painting of Dr. George W. Comstock by Steven Christopher Seward 2003
- Born: George W. Comstock; January 7, 1915; Niagara Falls, New York
- Died: July 15, 2007 (aged 92); Smithsburg, Maryland
- Education: Antioch College (undergraduate), Harvard Medical School (MD), University of Michigan (MPH), Johns Hopkins University (DrPH)
- Occupations: Epidemiologist and physician
- Known for: Tuberculosis epidemiology, editor of American Journal of Epidemiology

George Wills Comstock (January 7, 1915 – July 15, 2007) was a public health physician, epidemiologist, and educator. He was known for significant contributions to public health, specifically in the fields of micronutrient deficiencies, tuberculosis, and cardiovascular disease. He served as the editor-in-chief for American Journal of Epidemiology.

== Early life ==
George W. Comstock was born on January 7, 1915, in Niagara Falls, New York, to George Frederick Comstock, a metallurgical engineer, and Ella Gardner Wills Comstock. He graduated from Antioch College in 1937. In 1941, he obtained his medical degree from Harvard Medical School.

== Career ==
=== Public Health Service ===
Comstock joined the United States Public Health Service in 1942 and served as captain for 21 years. During this time, he conducted the first trials of the BCG vaccine for tuberculosis in Georgia and Alabama (1947–1951). The results of these trials were key in the decision not to implement the vaccine in the United States.

=== Public health education ===
He received a Master of Public Health from the University of Michigan School of Public Health in 195? and Doctorate of Public Health in Epidemiology from Johns Hopkins School of Public Health in 1956. He subsequently joined their faculty and taught there for more than 50 years.

=== Tuberculosis treatment research ===
In 1957, he led research in Bethel, Alaska, estimating the high burden of tuberculosis and demonstrating the drug isoniazid's effectiveness in preventing the disease.

=== Community-based research ===
In 1962, Comstock founded the Johns Hopkins Training Center for Public Health Research and Prevention in Hagerstown, Maryland. With Abraham Lilienfeld, he came up with the pioneering idea of using biologic samples in cohort studies. For the next 42 years, Comstock oversaw community-based research studies on numerous diseases including cancer and heart disease, including the Cardiovascular Health Study (CHS), the Campaign Against Cancer and Stroke (CLUE I), the Campaign Against Cancer and Heart Disease (CLUE II), and the Atherosclerosis Risk in Communities (ARIC) study.

=== American Journal of Epidemiology ===
Comstock also served as editor-in-chief of the American Journal of Epidemiology (AJE) from 1979 to 1988. He was subsequently the editor-in-chief, emeritus, from 1991 to 2007. Volume 167, issue 7 of AJE was dedicated entirely to Comstock following his death.

== Awards and contributions ==
Comstock authored hundreds of scientific papers and received numerous awards, including the John Snow Award from the American Public Health Association, the Edward Livingston Trudeau Medal from the American Thoracic Society, the Maxwell Finland Award for Scientific Achievement from the National Foundation for Infectious Diseases and the National Heart, Lung and Blood Institute's Career Research Award.

In 2005, the Hopkins center in Hagerstown, Maryland, was renamed The George W. Comstock Center for Public Health Research and Prevention.
