= Sortwell =

Sortwell is a surname. Notable people with the surname include:

- Alvin F. Sortwell (1854–1910), American politician
- Shae Sortwell (born 1985), American politician

== See also ==
- Nickels-Sortwell House
- Sartwell
