= Allen Wilcox =

American epidemiologist

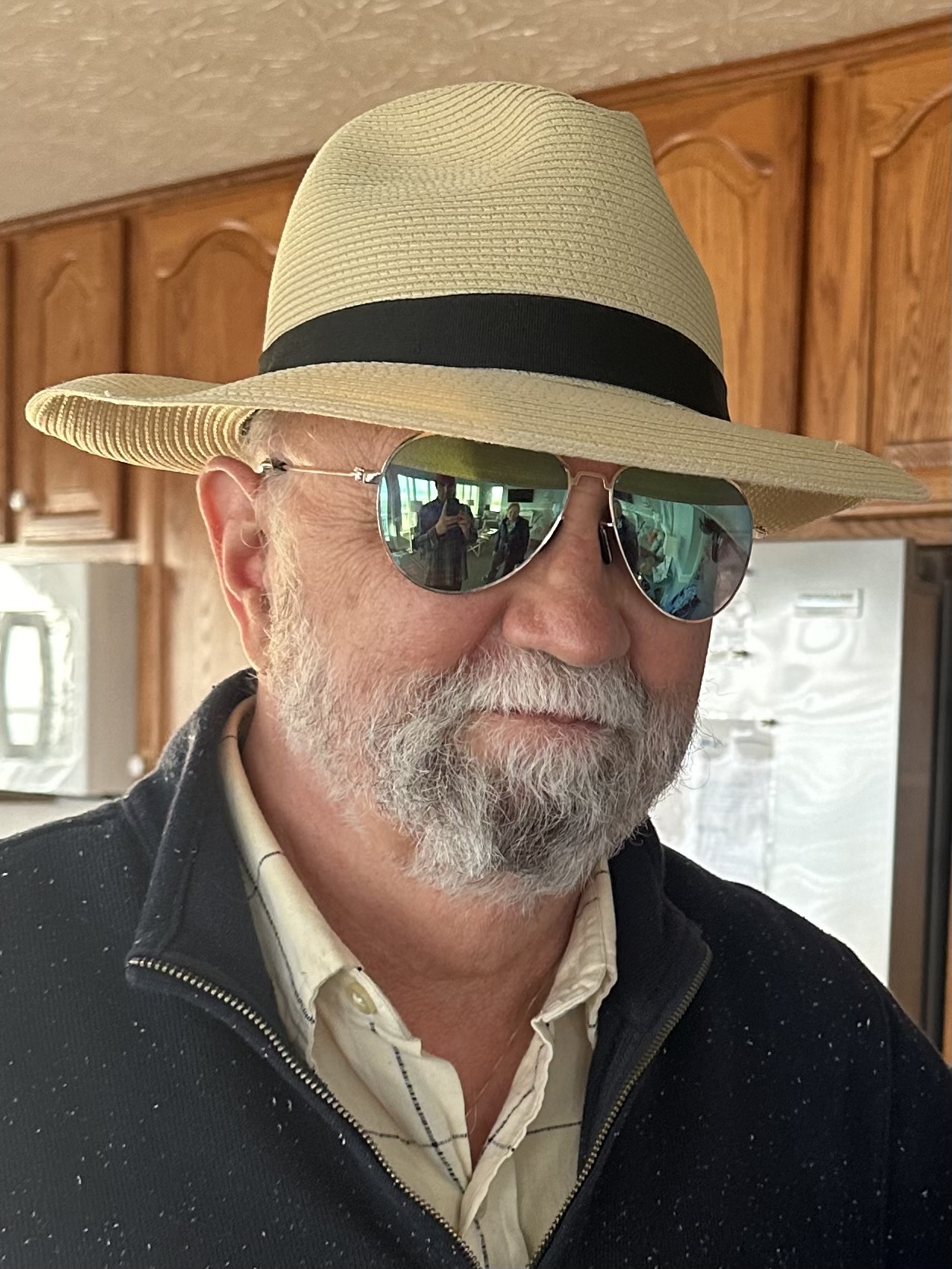
Allen Wilcox in April 2024

Allen James Wilcox is an American epidemiologist who heads the reproductive epidemiology group at the National Institute of Environmental Health Sciences (NIEHS).

== Education ==
Wilcox received his BA degree from the University of Michigan in 1968 and his MD from the University of Michigan Health System in 1973. He later received both his MPH and PhD from the UNC Gillings School of Global Public Health (formerly known as the University of North Carolina at Chapel Hill School of Public Health) in 1976 and 1979, respectively.

== Career ==
Wilcox began working at the NIEHS in 1979, where he helped establish their epidemiology branch and served as its chief from 1991 to 2001. He became a senior investigator at the NIEHS's epidemiology branch in 2001.

== Research ==
Wilcox's research falls into three categories: fertility and pregnancy, the use of birth weight and preterm delivery in perinatal research, and fetal development and child health. In 1988, he published a study that found that 31% of pregnancies ended in miscarriages, and in 1994, he published a study that found a strong link between the environment in which people live and work and the risk of birth defects in their children. In 1995, he published a study that found that women had the best chance of conceiving a child if they had sex on the day of ovulation, with the odds of conception falling sharply thereafter. The same study found that the period during which women had the highest chance of conceiving lasted six days, including the five days before ovulation and the day of the ovulation itself.

== Honors, awards and positions ==
Wilcox has served as the president of the American Epidemiological Society, the Society for Pediatric and Perinatal Epidemiologic Research, and the Society for Epidemiologic Research. He received an honorary Ph.D. from the University of Bergen in 2008.

== Editorial activities ==
Wilcox was the editor-in-chief of the peer-reviewed journal Epidemiology from 2001-2014.
