= Jennifer Ahern =

American epidemiologist (born 1974)

- Born: 1974 (age 51–52)
- Education: Brown University; University of California, Berkeley
- Scientific career
- Fields: Social epidemiology
- Workplaces: UC Berkeley School of Public Health

Jennifer Ahern (born 1974) is an American epidemiologist. She currently holds the King Sweesy and Robert Womack Endowed Chair and is the Executive Associate Dean at the UC Berkeley School of Public Health. Her research focuses on the effects of the social and physical environment, and programs and policies that alter the social and physical environment, on many aspects of health including violence, substance abuse, mental health, and perinatal health.

Ahern earned a Bachelor of Arts in human biology from Brown University in 1997. She completed her Master of Public Health and doctoral degree in epidemiology at the University of California, Berkeley in 2000 and 2007, respectively.

From 2021 to 2022, she was President of the Society for Epidemiologic Research. In 2022, she was named a Chan Zuckerberg Biohub Investigator, a designation that allows here to continue her work at UC Berkeley. At Berkeley, she is Professor of Epidemiology and Executive Associate Dean in the School of Public Health, where she mentors students in epidemiologic methods, social epidemiology, and policy evaluation. She served as the Associate Dean for Research from July 2016 through July 2026.

Her work integrates epidemiologic modeling, systems science, and policy analysis to understand and address inequities in public health. The research she leads includes: mental health, epidemiology, social epidemiology, population health, neighborhood characteristics and health, methodological issues and novel methodological applications in social, traumatic events, substance use, behavioral health, birth outcomes, and maternal health.
