= Sartwell =

Sartwell is an American surname. Notable people with the surname include:

- Crispin Sartwell (born 1958), American philosopher, self-professed anarchist and journalist
- Philip Sartwell (1908–1999), American epidemiologist and professor
- Henry Parker Sartwell (1792–1867), American botanist
