= Kenneth Rothman (epidemiologist) =

Epidemiologist

Kenneth J. Rothman (born November 2, 1945) is an American epidemiologist. He is a professor of epidemiology at the Boston University School of Public Health, as well as a Distinguished Fellow at RTI International, where he is Vice President for Epidemiologic Research at RTI Health Solutions.

== Education ==
Rothman earned his Dr.P.H. and his M.P.H. degrees from the Harvard School of Public Health and his D.M.D. degree from the Harvard School of Dental Medicine.

== Work ==
Rothman is known for his work on, and teaching about, epidemiologic research methodology, as well as multiple specific epidemiologic subjects, including the teratogenic effects of vitamin A, the health effects of mobile phone use, and possible environmental causes of cancer. He is also the author of two widely used epidemiology textbooks. In 1990, he wrote a controversial article arguing that it might not be worth epidemiologists' time for them to investigate most cancer clusters.

== Honors, awards and positions ==
Rothman received the American Public Health Association’s Abraham Lilienfeld Award for 2002, recognizing excellence in the teaching of epidemiology during the course of a career. He is also a Fellow of the International Society for Pharmacoepidemiology, the past president of the Society for Epidemiologic Research, and an honorary fellow of the American College of Epidemiology. In 2002 the journal Epidemiology renamed its annual prize the "Kenneth Rothman Epidemiology Prize".

== Editorial activities ==
In 1990, Rothman founded the journal Epidemiology, and subsequently served as its founding editor until 2001.
