= David Celentano =

American epidemiologist (born 1951)

David DuPuy Celentano
- Born: 1951 (age 74–75)
- Education: Johns Hopkins University BA, MHS, ScD
- Occupation: Epidemiologist
- Known for: HIV/AIDS and STI research

David DuPuy Celentano (born 1951) is an epidemiologist and professor whose research focuses on HIV/AIDS and other sexually transmitted infections (STIs). He is the Charles Armstrong chair of the Department of Epidemiology at the Johns Hopkins Bloomberg School of Public Health. He holds joint appointments with the school's departments of Health Policy and Management, Health Behavior and Society, and International Health, and the Johns Hopkins University School of Medicine's Division of Infectious Diseases.

== Education and professional experience ==
Celentano graduated with a Bachelor of Arts (BA) degree in psychology from Johns Hopkins University in 1972, later earning a Master of Health Science (MHS) degree in mental hygiene (1975) and Doctor of Science (ScD) degree in behavioral sciences (1977) from the Johns Hopkins School of Hygiene and Public Health (now the Bloomberg School of Public Health). He began his professional career as an addictions counselor at the University of Maryland Hospital in Baltimore, Maryland, later working as a research specialist for the Maryland Department of Health and Mental Hygiene. In 1976, Celentano began working as a research associate in the Office of Health and Manpower Studies, School of Health Services at Johns Hopkins University.

He returned to the School of Public Health in 1978 as a faculty member in the Department of Behavioral Sciences before becoming the head of the Division of Behavioral Sciences and Health Education in the Department of Health Policy and Management in 1987. In 1996, Celentano joined the Department of Epidemiology and three years later, was appointed director of the Infectious Disease track. In 2005, Celentano became deputy chairman, later serving as interim chairman from 2008-2009. He was appointed as the inaugural Charles Armstrong Chair of the Department of Epidemiology in 2009.

== Research interests ==
Celentano's research integrates behavioral science theory and research with epidemiology methods in the study of behavioral and social epidemiology. While originally trained in a chronic disease paradigm (alcoholism and cancer control), he began his research in HIV/AIDS and STIs in the early 1980s. He has worked on some of the major cohort studies AIDS Linked to the Intravenous Experience (ALIVE), Multicenter AIDS Cohort Study (MACS) in HIV epidemiology, as well as conducted intervention research in the USA for heterosexual men and women, injection drug users, and young men who have sex with men.

In 1990, Celentano turned to international research when he began a long-term collaboration with Chiang Mai University in northern Thailand. He has worked on and directed numerous HIV/AIDS and STI epidemiological investigations and preventive interventions. He and his collaborators have demonstrated that a behavioral intervention with young military conscripts lead to a 7-fold reduction in incident STDs and halved the HIV incidence rate. In addition, the role of STDs and alcohol use on HIV acquisition has been documented. More recently, his group has conducted a prospective study of hormonal contraception in relation to HIV seroconversion, a study with significant family planning policy and health implications. Celentano recently completed four NIH-supported studies in Thailand, focusing on interventions to influence the association between opiate use, methamphetamine use, and other drugs on HIV. The focus of these interventions was to harness indigenous peer networks for risk reduction.

He was the Thailand principal investigator (PI) of Project Accept/HPTN 043, which showed the strong influence of community mobilization, HIV counseling and testing at the village level with post-test support services reduced behavioral risk and increased HIV counseling and testing to 72% of at-risk villagers in three years. Other work addresses the use of antiretroviral treatment as HIV prevention (HPTN 052) which was cited by Science as the major scientific breakthrough of 2011 and opioid substitution therapy as HIV prevention (NPTN 058) for persons who inject drugs. New research includes a community-randomized trial of methods to link men who have sex with men with needed health and psychological health services in India, and studies of seek, test, treat and retain drug users with HIV care in India and Vietnam. Celentano is a mentor to eight Doctor of Public Health (DrPH) degree students from Abu Dhabi, United Arab Emirates and is doing public health practice in the Kingdom of Saudi Arabia and the State of Qatar with Ministry of Health funding in collaboration with Ernst & Young MENA (Middle East and North Africa).

== Honors and awards ==
- 1984 – Elected to the Delta Omega Honor Society, Alpha Chapter
- 2000 – Elected to the American College of Epidemiology
- 2002 – Elected to the American Epidemiological Society
- 2002 – Received the American Association for Public Opinion Research Innovators Award for the development of the Audio Computer-Assisted Self-Interviewing mode of survey data collection
- 2002 – Received the American Sexually Transmitted Disease Association's Achievement Award
- 2005 – Received the Clinical Infectious Diseases' Meritorious Reviewer Award
- 2006 – Received Doctor of Philosophy in Medical Sciences from Chiang Mai University, Thailand

== Society membership ==
- 1973–present: American Public Health Association
- 1980–present: Society for Epidemiologic Research
- 1984–present: Delta Omega, Alpha Chapter
- 1989–present: American Sexually Transmitted Disease Association
- 1990–present: International AIDS Society
- 1996–present: AIDS Society of Asia & the Pacific
