= Timothy L. Lash =

American epidemiologist

- Education: Massachusetts Institute of Technology (B.S.); Boston University (M.P.H., D.Sc.)
- Scientific career
- Fields: Epidemiology
- Institutions: Emory University

Timothy L. Lash is an American epidemiologist and the O. Wayne Rollins Distinguished Professor of Epidemiology and Chair of the Department of Epidemiology at the Rollins School of Public Health at Emory University. He is known for his work on cancer prevention and epidemiologic methods, including methods for applying quantitative bias analysis. He is the Editor-in-Chief of the peer reviewed journal Epidemiology.

== Textbooks ==
- Lash T, VanderWeele T, Haneuse S, Rothman K (2020). Modern Epidemiology (4th ed.). Lippincott Williams & Wilkins (LWW).
- Fox M, MacLehose R, Lash T (2021). Applying Quantitative Bias Analysis to Epidemiologic Data. Springer Cham.
