= Henry Mosley (epidemiologist) =

Epidemiologist and international public health professional

Wiley Henry Mosley
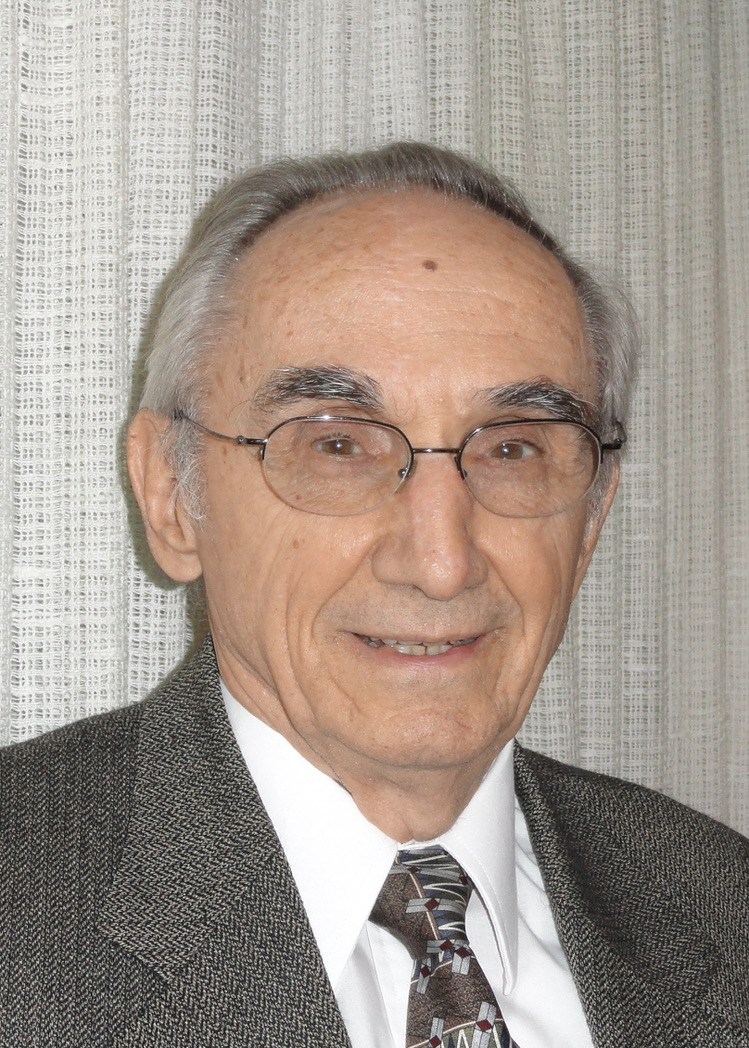
- Born: October 17, 1933 (age 92); Tsingkiangpu, Jiangsu, China
- Occupations: Epidemiologist, academic and researcher
- Title: Professor Emeritus
- Awards: Meritorious Service Medal, U. S. Public Health Service; Ernest L. Stebbins Medal, Johns Hopkins Bloomberg School of Public Health; Carl Taylor Lifetime Achievement Award, American Public Health Association

Academic background
- Education: B.A., Chemistry; M.D., Medicine; M.P.H., Epidemiology
- Alma mater: Rhodes College; University of Oklahoma School of Medicine; Johns Hopkins University School of Hygiene & Public Health

Wiley Henry Mosley is an epidemiologist and international public health professional. He is Emeritus Professor in the Department of Population, Family and Reproductive Health at Johns Hopkins Bloomberg School of Public Health.

Mosley has published over 140 scientific papers on infectious and parasitic diseases, demographic and population studies, reproductive health, child survival, and population and health policy in developing countries. His field trials on cholera vaccines in East Pakistan (now Bangladesh) in the 1960s, including serological surveys of cholera antibodies, provided a basic understanding of cholera immunology and led to the removal of the WHO International Quarantine Regulation requiring 6-monthly cholera injections for all international travelers. His operational research on contraceptive distribution in rural Bangladesh in the 1970s laid the foundation for the country's national family planning program. In the 1980s, working with Lincoln C. Chen, he developed an analytical framework for child survival research that is widely cited by researchers and has been designated by the WHO as a Public Health Classic.

In the 1990s he joined with Dean Jamison at the World Bank to produce the first edition of Disease Control Priorities in Developing Countries. He initiated the Matlab Demographic Surveillance System in rural Bangladesh in 1966 and led the establishment of the International Center for Diarrheal Disease Research, Bangladesh in 1979.

== Early life and education ==
Mosley was born in China where his parents were medical missionaries for the Presbyterian Church in the US. He earned his bachelor's degree in chemistry from Rhodes College in 1955 and his M.D. degree in medicine from University of Oklahoma College of Medicine in 1959. Mosley then completed his residency in medicine, from Johns Hopkins Hospital from 1959 to 1961 and 1963–64. He was in the US Public Health Service, Epidemic Intelligence Service from 1961 to 1963, serving in the Des Moines, Polk County Health Department. He received his M.P.H. degree with specialization in epidemiology from Johns Hopkins University School of Hygiene & Public Health in 1965.

== Career ==
Mosley rejoined the USPHS in 1964 and in 1965 was assigned as Head of Epidemiology Division at the Pakistan SEATO Cholera Research Laboratory, Dacca, East Pakistan (now Bangladesh) where he conducted cholera vaccine field trials. During that time, he established the Matlab Demographic Surveillance System (DSS) and initiated a series of population studies. In 1971 Mosley was appointed by Johns Hopkins University School of Hygiene and Public Health as Professor and Chairman of the new Department of Population Dynamics where he established the Hopkins Population Center.

In 1977, he returned to Bangladesh as Director of the Cholera Research Laboratory and in the following two years, led the transformation of the institution into the International Center for Diarrheal Disease Research, Bangladesh (ICDDR,B). Mosley then served for three years as Visiting Professor at University of Nairobi, Kenya with Population Council support before moving to Jakarta, Indonesia, where, from 1982 until 1985, he served as Child Survival Program Officer with the Ford Foundation.

In 1985, he returned to Johns Hopkins Bloomberg School of Public Health as Professor and Chairman of Department of Population Dynamics, serving until 1998. During this term, he established the Johns Hopkins Institute for International Programs and initiated the Distance Education Training Program at the SPH. Later, with Laurie Zabin, he co-founded the Bill and Melinda Gates Institute for Population and Reproductive Health. From 1998 until 2020, Mosley, with Ben Lozare, developed and taught courses on Strategic Leadership for Health System Transformation at Hopkins and internationally; these have been institutionalized in a number of developing country universities in Asia and Africa. He was appointed as Emeritus Professor by Johns Hopkins in 2009.

== Research ==
Mosley has conducted public health related research on various topics including infectious and parasitic diseases, demographic and population studies, reproductive health, child survival, and population and health policy in developing countries.

=== Cholera vaccine field trials in East Pakistan ===
During his tenure as Head of Epidemiology Division at the Pakistan-SEATO Cholera Research Laboratory in East Pakistan in the 1960s, he conducted controlled cholera vaccine field trials in rural Matlab Thana accompanied by serological surveys for cholera antibodies that provided a basic understanding of cholera immunology. His research pointed to vibriocidal antibody titres as a measure of the level of immunity in a population. He also found that effect of a single injection of the cholera vaccine could be demonstrated on population with traceable vibriocidal and agglutinating antibodies two years after the injection. In the 1966-67 vaccine trial of one dose versus two doses of cholera vaccine in children under 14, he again documented a correlation of the vibriocidal antibody response with protection, though both declined within a few months after inoculation. Serological studies in the control population suggested that inapparent cholera infection could have been up to 100 times higher than clinical cases. In the 1968-69 cholera vaccine field trial, three vaccines were tested, whole cell Inabla and Ogawa vaccines, and a purified Inaba antigen. Only Inaba cholera occurred; the study demonstrated protection in the youngest children by the Inaba vaccine but not the Ogawa vaccine, documenting serotype specificity in cholera immunity. Ultimately, Mosley's work, led to the conclusion that the cholera vaccines available at that time were insufficiently effective for use in cholera control programs, given that highly effective oral rehydration was available for treatment.

=== Population, reproductive health and family planning ===
In 1966, Mosley initiated the longitudinal Demographic Surveillance System (DSS), in the Matlab Thana, Bangladesh vaccine trial population, initially covering 115,000 persons with daily house-to-house monitoring. The Matlab DSS has operated continuously since that time and has been the foundation for over 750 scientific studies.

Mosley, with Lincoln Chen studied birth-interval dynamics in rural Bangladesh by following married women prospectively with monthly pregnancy tests and a fertility questionnaire. This study documented that the long birth intervals of about 3 years were due to prolonged breast feeding extending the period of lactational amenorrhea up to 18 months. This research provided the basis for promoting lactational amenorrhea (LAM) as one method for postpartum family planning.

Also with Lincoln Chen, Mosley conducted prospective studies of maternal mortality in rural Bangladesh in the 1960s, documenting that around one-third of adult female deaths were maternity related. This research provided the empirical validation of the definition of maternity related deaths recommended by the Committee on Maternal and Child Care of the American Medical Association.

Mosley started the Matlab Family Planning - Health Services Project by Cholera Research Laboratory in the late 1970s that involved household distribution of all available contraceptive methods in rural Bangladesh. With Mukhlisur Rahman, he preceded this Project with a study of the rapid decline in use of contraceptives in an earlier pill and condom distribution program, documenting the relevant factors amenable to program modification. The fact that this was method-oriented strategy instead of a client-oriented strategy was identified as the major factor leading to decline of contraceptive use. To counter this, Mosley, with Shushum Bhatia introduced various program modifications including offering the full range of contraceptive methods delivered by young village women who themselves were contraceptive users. This work was extended by others leading to the operational strategy for the Bangladesh national family planning program beginning in the 1980s.

=== Child health and survival in developing countries ===
In 1983, Mosley, with Lincoln Chen, convened an interdisciplinary group of scholars at a Bellagio Conference to review child survival research strategies. The purpose was to identify the key determinants of morbidity and mortality and propose a research framework for bringing together biomedical and social scientists.

At this Conference, Mosley and Chen proposed an analytical framework incorporating both social and biological variables for studying the determinants of child survival in developing countries. This analytical framework has subsequently been adopted by many researchers and has been identified as a Public Health Classic by the WHO in 2003.

=== Population and health policy in developing countries ===
Mosley joined Dean Jamison, an economist at the World Bank to initiate an investigation of interventions for major diseases in less developed countries. This was the first time that epidemiological and demographic investigations were combined with an economic analysis to identify cost-effective interventions for current health problems with projections for the future. This work provided the basis for World Bank's 1993 World Development Report on Investing in Health.

== Advocacy ==
Mosley is a member of Christian Connections for International Health (CCIH) since its inception in 1987. He has been an active advocate for the role of faith-based institutions in supporting family planning.

Mosley gave the background presentation on "What is the role of family planning in improving health? A Christian perspective" at a technical meeting in 2014 titled "Faith Matters: International Family Planning from a Christian Perspective". Mosley followed this event in 2014 with an editorial in the Christian Journal of Global Health on Family Planning as a Christian Global Health Agenda”. In 2018, he published a defense of the role of Christians in family planning programs in the CJGH titled "Why Evangelical Christians Are Supporting International Family Planning. A response to 'Should evangelical Christian organizations support international family planning'".

== Awards and honors ==
- 1970 - Meritorious Service Medal, U. S. Public Health Service
- 1996 - Advising, Mentoring and Teaching Recognition Award, Johns Hopkins Bloomberg School of Public Health
- 1997 - Golden Apple Award, Johns Hopkins Bloomberg School of Public Health
- 2000 - Ernest L. Stebbins Medal, Johns Hopkins Bloomberg School of Public Health
- 2001 - Distinguished Alumni Award, Rhodes College
- 2003 - Honorary Professorship, Nanjing College of Population Program Management
- 2011 - Carl Taylor Lifetime Achievement Award, American Public Health Association
- 2012 - The Global Achievement Award, Johns Hopkins Alumni Association
- 2015 - Christian International Health Champion, Christian Connections for International Health
