= Laurie Schwab Zabin =

American public health researcher and professor (1926–2020)

- Born: April 9, 1926; New York City, NY
- Died: May 11, 2020 (aged 94)
- Education: Vassar College (BA); Harvard University (MA); Johns Hopkins University (PhD)
- Occupations: Public health researcher, professor
- Organization: Planned Parenthood

Laurie Schwab Zabin (April 9, 1926–May 11, 2020) was an American public health researcher and professor who studied adolescent reproductive health, family planning, sexual behaviors, and abortion trends. Her research and advocacy work made her a leading figure in this field.

== Personal life ==
Zabin was born in New York City in 1926 to Jewish-American parents Carol Heilner and Armand Schwab, respectively. Armand immigrated to the United States from Alsace-Lorraine, France and sold hats as an occupation.

Zabin married Lewis H. Strauss. Together they moved to Baltimore in 1948. At the time of their union, Strauss was a student at Johns Hopkins University who was studying physics. The two eventually divorced.

Zabin gave birth to her first child in 1951. It was during her pregnancy and child-bearing experience that she became well acquainted with her obstetrician, Alan Guttmacher. Guttmacher and Zabin established a friendship that eventually blossomed into a working professional relationship. The conversations they had about reproductive health sparked new interests in Zabin.

The day after Zabin gave birth, Guttmacher asked her if she would be willing to support him in his efforts to introduce more access to contraceptives for inner-city women in Baltimore. At the time, this was a pressing public health issue that required more attention. Zabin, having new interests in women's rights and healthcare rights, agreed to assist with this project by becoming a volunteer for Planned Parenthood.

== Education ==
Zabin attended The Dalton School from kindergarten to the 12th grade. Afterwards, she attended Vassar College, earning a Bachelors of Arts in English Literature before expanding her education at Harvard University. At Harvard, she completed a thesis project on a Welsh poet named Dylan Thomas and earned her Masters of Arts. In 1948, she received a PhD in English from Johns Hopkins University.

Her professional pursuits shifted significantly after meeting with Guttmacher, so much so that she became an avid volunteer for Planned Parenthood of Maryland in 1951. After years of volunteering and assisting Guttmacher's endeavors in advancing healthcare rights for inner-city women, Zabin decided to pursue additional education within the realm of family planning and reproductive health at Johns Hopkins University.

Zabin pointed out that her education at Vassar College instilled a sense of curiosity in her, which ultimately encouraged her to explore new fields outside of Literature and English.

In 1975, she applied to the PhD program in Population Dynamics at the Johns Hopkins University Bloomberg School of Public Health, formerly known as Johns Hopkins School of Hygiene and Public Health at the time of her attendance. Despite not having a solid academic science background, Laurie had substantial credentials and leadership experiences as a long-time volunteer with Planned Parenthood. She even met the chair of the PhD program, W. Henry Mosley, to discuss her interests in gaining research and educational experience within the field of public health. She was accepted to the program and eventually earned her PhD in 1979 at the age of 53.

== Research and advocacy ==
Zabin's research at Johns Hopkins investigated trends in teenage pregnancies. Her dissertation revealed that approximately half of teenage pregnancies occur during the first 15 to 19 months after teenage girls become sexually active. Interestingly, she also found that teenage girls were not seeking services from clinics until roughly a year after becoming sexually active, suggesting that part of the issue dealt with timing of medical services.

Her findings were pivotal for vitalizing public health efforts to establish more family planning and contraceptive clinics across schools in the United States. Zabin and her colleagues began this initiative by establishing a family planning clinic near two high schools in Baltimore with the intent of providing better-quality education to high school teens about reproductive health. Zabin's work was vital for introducing the idea of schools providing reproductive education and services to teens.

In 1981, she helped establish the Social Science Fertility Research Unit in the Johns Hopkins OB/GYN division. She also taught public health students at Johns Hopkins as a professor and continued to publish research articles on reproductive health and family planning.

== Leadership ==
In 1962, Zabin was invited to join the national board of Planned Parenthood due to her significant contributions as a volunteer. As a board member, she directed committees on policy development and also helped expand the national reach of Planned Parenthood.

Zabin served on the Adolescent Health Committee of the American College of Obstetrics/Gynecology. She also helped establish the Population and Reproductive Health division of the Bill & Melinda Gates Institute for Population Control in 1998, serving as the director until 2002. During those years, she assisted in the training of over 850 scholars, fellows, and researchers from all across the globe with the aim of improving leadership and research skills in public health.

== Death ==
Zabin died at the age of 94 on May 11, 2020, due to kidney failure.

== Recognition ==
- 1992 Irwin M. Cushner Award by the National Family Planning & Reproductive Health Association. This award recognizes healthcare providers, policymakers, and researchers who make notable contributions within the field of family planning.
- In 2002, Johns Hopkins created a fellowship in Reproductive Health in her honor.
- 2003 Carl A. Shultz Award of the American Public Health Association.
- Planned Parenthood of Maryland Margaret Sanger Award.
- 2017 Lifetime Achievement Award of Planned Parenthood.
