= Philip Sartwell =

American epidemiologist (1908–1999)

Philip E. Sartwell
- Born: 1908; Salem, Massachusetts, U.S.
- Died: Nov 26, 1999 (aged 90–91); Marblehead, Massachusetts

Philip E. Sartwell (1908–1999) was a noted epidemiologist and professor at the Johns Hopkins School of Hygiene and Public Health.

== Education ==
Sartwell obtained a medical degree in 1932 from the Boston University School of Medicine, and in 1938 earned a master's in public health degree from the Harvard University School of Public Health.

== Career ==
After his formal education, Sartwell was the Assistant Director of the Division of Tuberculosis in the Massachusetts Department of Health for five years. In 1943, during World War II, he joined the U.S. Army serving as a major in the Epidemiology Section in the Office of the Surgeon General.

Sartwell joined the faculty at the Johns Hopkins University School of Hygiene and Public Health's Department of Epidemiology in 1947. He served as Chair of the Department of Epidemiology from 1954 to 1970. He served as the Editor-in-Chief of the American Journal of Epidemiology from 1957 to 1958.

Sartwell additionally established the journal Epidemiologic Reviews and served as its first editor-in-chief from 1979 to 1982. Sartwell was additionally involved in the US Centers for Disease Control and Prevention's (CDC's) Epidemic Intelligence Service (EIS) on the team that trained the first class of EIS officers in the year 1951. He was the first president of the Maryland Public Health Association when it was founded in 1955.

== Research interests ==
Sartwell's epidemiologic research covered a wide range of fields. His work on the incubation periods of infectious diseases is highly regarded to this day and considered a foundation of modern infectious disease epidemiology. He is remembered for his work on the association between oral contraceptives and thromboembolism as well as breast cancer. He additionally assessed the harm of occupational exposure to radiation. His work included assessing the effectiveness of vaccination against influenza and polio. He is known for Sartwell's law.
