= Jennifer Dowd =

American social scientist

Jennifer Beam Dowd
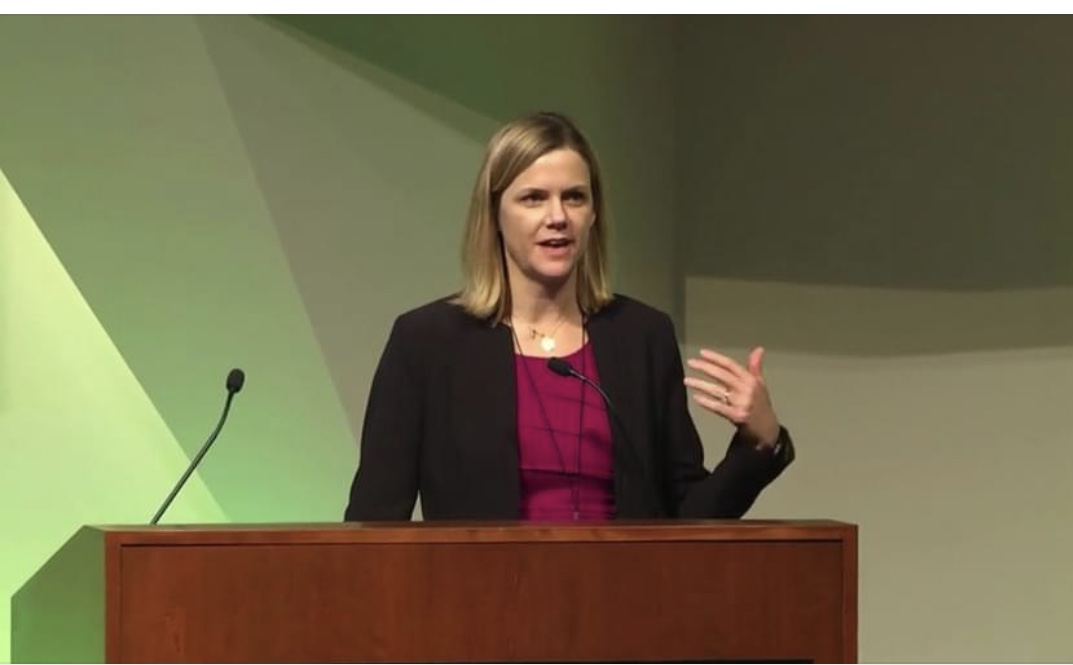
- Jennifer Beam Dowd
- Education: Princeton University; Washington and Lee University
- Scientific career
- Workplaces: King's College London; University of Oxford
- Thesis: Socioeconomic status and health : testing the pathways (2004)
- Website: JennDowd.com

Jennifer Beam Dowd is an American social scientist who is a Professor of Demography and Population Health and deputy director of the Leverhulme Centre for Demographic Science at the University of Oxford. Her research considers the social determinants of health and the relationship between infections and immune function. She is a member of Those Nerdy Girls, an all-woman team of public health researchers who are relaying COVID-19 information as part of Dear Pandemic.

== Early life and education ==
Dowd studied political science and Spanish at Washington and Lee University, and graduated in 1996. After graduation she spent a year as a Henry Luce Scholar in East Java, Indonesia where she worked on agricultural and reproductive health at the Rural Development Foundation. Dowd completed her graduate studies in Demography and Economics at the School of Public and International Affairs and the Office of Population Research at Princeton University, where she studied the relationship between socioeconomic status and health. In 2006 Dowd moved to the University of Michigan as a Robert Wood Johnson Health Scholar.

== Research and career ==
Dowd started her independent scientific career at the City University of New York in the CUNY School of Public Health and CUNY Institute for Demographic Research, first as an assistant then an associate professor in the Department of Epidemiology and Biostatistics. She moved to the United Kingdom in 2016, where she was made an associate professor at King's College London. In 2019 Dowd left King's College for the University of Oxford.

Her research considers the social factors that impact health, including how socioeconomic status influences the human microbiome and immune function. She has makes use of data from the TwinsUK and NYC Health and Nutrition Examination Survey (NYC HANES) studies; population-based cross-sectional surveys of public health.

During the COVID-19 pandemic Dowd joined Dear Pandemic, sharing public health information through an all-woman collective known as Nerdy Girls. Dowd looks to curate reliable and accurate information about the pandemic. The group engage in public health outreach on a variety of different platforms, including mainstream media outlets, on Facebook and on Instagram. By employing the same platforms and approaches as those who spread misinformation, the nerdy girls look to debunk myths and arm people with the knowledge to make informed decisions.

In 2020 Dowd was awarded a European Research Council Consolidator Grant. Her research proposal looks to understand why life expectancy is no longer increasing in some parts of the world.

== Selected publications ==
- Dowd, Jennifer Beam; Andriano, Liliana; Rotondi, Valentina; Brazel, David M.; Block, Per; Ding, Xuejie; Liu, Yan; Mills, Melinda C. (2020). "Demographic science aids in understanding the spread and fatality rates of COVID-19". Proceedings of the National Academy of Sciences. 117 (18): 9696–9698. Bibcode:2020PNAS..117.9696D. doi:10.1073/pnas.2004911117. medRxiv 10.1101/2020.03.15.20036293v2. PMC 7211934. PMID 32300018.
- Simanek, Amanda M.; Dowd, Jennifer Beam; Pawelec, Graham; Melzer, David; Dutta, Ambarish; Aiello, Allison E. (17 February 2011). "Seropositivity to Cytomegalovirus, Inflammation, All-Cause and Cardiovascular Disease-Related Mortality in the United States". PLOS ONE. 6 (2) e16103. Bibcode:2011PLoSO...616103S. doi:10.1371/journal.pone.0016103. ISSN 1932-6203. PMC 3040745. PMID 21379581.
- Dowd, J. B.; Zajacova, A. (30 October 2007). "Does the predictive power of self-rated health for subsequent mortality risk vary by socioeconomic status in the US?". International Journal of Epidemiology. 36 (6): 1214–1221. doi:10.1093/ije/dym214. ISSN 0300-5771. PMID 17971388.
