= Society for Epidemiologic Research =

- Abbreviation: SER
- Formation: 1968
- Founders: Abraham Lilienfeld; Milton Terris; Brian MacMahon; Lewis Kuller; Maureen Henderson; John C. Cassel
- Type: Learned society
- Purpose: "To keep epidemiologists at the vanguard of scientific developments"
- Headquarters: Eagle, Idaho
- Members: 2,000
- President: Jennifer Ahern
- Executive director: Suzanne S. Bevan
- Website: epiresearch.org

The Society for Epidemiologic Research (abbreviated SER) is a learned society dedicated to epidemiology. It was originally proposed in 1967 by Abraham Lilienfeld, Milton Terris, and Brian MacMahon, and was founded the following year. Their motivation in founding SER was to provide an annual meeting where junior faculty in epidemiology departments and graduate students could present their ongoing research to senior epidemiologists and receive criticism, comments, and encouragement. An additional goal was to promote the exchange of ideas between epidemiologists and statisticians.

Since 1968, SER has grown and its current membership is approximately 2000 individuals. The mission of SER today is "to keep epidemiologists at the vanguard of scientific developments".

== Leadership ==
In 2021, Onyebuchi A. Arah was elected as a president of the society; he became president-elect on July 1 of that year. He will serve as President July 1, 2022 - June 30, 2023. Jay Kaufman was elected in 2019, and Jennifer Ahern in 2020. Suzanne S. Bevan serves as executive director.

== Annual meeting ==
An annual meeting is held by the SER in June of each year. Of particular interest is the idea of consequential epidemiology, or the public health, preventive medicine, intervention, and policy implications of epidemiology, which is further discussed in a 2015 publication by Frumkin.

The annual meeting typically brings together 900 to 1100 attendees. Annual meetings have been held since 1968, and consist of presentations of ongoing research, a keynote address on a topic of current interest, and instructional workshops prior to the conference that began in the 1980s. Ongoing research was initially presented by the means of slides, but in 1997 this was changed to posters. Abstracts presented at SER meetings are annually published in a supplemental issue of the American Journal of Epidemiology. In 2020, SER added a virtual mid-year meeting held in early spring.

== Publications ==
Since 1975, the society has sponsored two peer-reviewed journals: the American Journal of Epidemiology and Epidemiologic Reviews. In addition to this, SER also releases digitally the SERplaylist, SERtalks, SERexperts, and SERdigital.

== Awards ==
- National SER Awards
- Distinguished Service to SER Award
- Kenneth Rothman Career Accomplishment Award
- Marshall Joffe Epidemiologic Methods Research Award
- Noel Weiss & Tom Koepsell Excellence in Education Award

=== Sponsored awards ===
- Brian MacMahon Early Career Award
- Carol J. Rowland Hogue Mid-Career Award
- Lilienfeld Postdoctoral Prize Paper Award
- Tyroler Student Prize Paper Award
