= Epidemiology (journal) =

- Discipline: Public health
- Language: English
- Edited by: Timothy L. Lash

Publication details
- History: 1990-present
- Publisher: Lippincott, Williams & Wilkins
- Frequency: Bimonthly
- Impact factor: 4.822 (2020)

Standard abbreviations
- ISO 4: Epidemiology

Indexing
- ISSN: 1044-3983

Links
- Journal homepage

Epidemiology is a bi-monthly, peer-reviewed journal for epidemiologic research, published by Lippincott Williams & Wilkins.

The journal publishes original research from all fields of epidemiology, as well as review articles, meta-analyses, novel hypotheses, descriptions and applications of new methods and discussions of research theory and public health policy. It is the official journal of the International Society for Environmental Epidemiology (ISEE). In 2020, Epidemiology had an impact factor of 4.822, ranking 35th among 203 journals in the field of public, environmental and occupational health.

Epidemiology was founded by Ken Rothman in 1990, who was Editor-in-Chief until 2001. From 2001-2014, Allen Wilcox was the Editor-in-Chief. Timothy Lash is the current Editor-in-Chief.
