= Henry Moseley (disambiguation) =

Henry Moseley (1887–1915) was an English physicist who developed the concept of atomic number.

Henry Moseley may also refer to:

- Henry Moseley (mathematician) (1801–1871), English churchman and scientist
- Henry Moseley (politician) (c. 1818–1864), Canadian politician
- Henry Nottidge Moseley (1844–1891), English naturalist and participant in the HMS Challenger expedition (father of the physicist)
- Henry J. Moseley (1819–1894), builder and publican in the colony of South Australia
