= Abraham Lilienfeld =

American epidemiologist

Abraham Morris Lilienfeld
- Born: Abraham Morris Lilienfeld; November 13, 1920; New York City, United States
- Died: August 6, 1984 (aged 63); Baltimore, Maryland, United States
- Education: Johns Hopkins University, University of Maryland, Johns Hopkins School of Hygiene and Public Health
- Known for: Expanding epidemiology to focus on chronic as well as infectious diseases
- Spouse: Lorraine Zemil
- Children: 3
- Awards: Ernest Lyman Stebbins medal from the Johns Hopkins Bloomberg School of Public Health, member of the Institute of Medicine
- Scientific career
- Fields: Epidemiology
- Workplaces: Johns Hopkins School of Hygiene and Public Health Roswell Park Comprehensive Cancer Center

Abraham Morris Lilienfeld (November 13, 1920 – August 6, 1984) was an American epidemiologist and professor at the Johns Hopkins School of Hygiene and Public Health serving in various roles; from lecturer in 1950, he rose to head of the Department of Chronic Diseases in 1961 and chair of the Department of Epidemiology in 1971 before he resigned in 1975. Lilienfeld was known for his work in expanding epidemiology to focus on chronic diseases as well as infectious ones. He also advocated for the link between smoking and lung cancer as early as 1962. The American College of Epidemiology's most prestigious award, the "Abraham Lilienfeld Award", is named in his honour.

== Early life and education ==
Lilienfeld was born in New York City on November 13, 1920. His father, Joe Lilienfeld, came from a wealthy family in Galicia, Ukraine, and worked as a Galician rabbinical scholar. Joe and his wife had immigrated to the United States in 1914 to escape the draft, leaving their money (which was all in German marks) behind in Germany when they did so. He graduated from Erasmus High School, whereupon he enrolled at Johns Hopkins University in Baltimore, allowing him to move in with his brother, Sam (a Baltimore resident), in 1938. In 1941, he received his A.B. from Johns Hopkins, after which he applied to the Johns Hopkins School of Medicine, but was told he would be rejected because he was Jewish. He then enrolled at Albany Medical College for a time before transferring to the University of Maryland's medical school. He received his M.D. from the University of Maryland in 1944, and his M.P.H. from the Johns Hopkins University School of Hygiene and Public Health in 1949.

== Career ==
Lilienfeld joined the faculty of the Johns Hopkins University School of Hygiene and Public Health as a lecturer in 1950, and became an assistant professor of epidemiology there in 1952. From 1954 to 1958, he served on the faculty of the University of Buffalo School of Medicine. During this time, he also founded, and served as the first chairman of the department of statistics and epidemiological research at Roswell Park Comprehensive Cancer Center, then known as Roswell Park Memorial Institute. In 1958, he returned to Johns Hopkins, where he became the head of the Division of Chronic Diseases in the Department of Public Health Administration, which became the Department of Chronic Diseases in 1961. In 1964, he was named the staff director of the President's Commission on Heart Disease, Cancer, and Stroke. In 1967, he co-founded the Society for Epidemiologic Research, a learned society for epidemiologists. In 1970, his Department of Chronic Diseases merged with the Department of Epidemiology, and he became chair of the new department, the Department of Epidemiology. In 1974, he sustained a cardiac arrest in the middle of a class he was teaching. He was revived by his students. Following on that illness, in 1975, he resigned the chair of this department. He subsequently became the first director the Masters in Public Health Program at Johns Hopkins, and instituted its reformation and revitalization. He then became the acting chair of the Department of Mental Hygiene for a 18 or so months during which a new chair was recruited. The last administrative role he had in his career was as acting chair of the Department of Behavioral Science. He has been described as "instrumental" in the founding of the American College of Epidemiology in 1979.

== Work ==
Lilienfeld is known for working to expand the field of epidemiology from its original focus on infectious diseases to include chronic diseases, which has led to him being called the "father of contemporary chronic disease epidemiology." He is also known for, along with Richard Bordow, co-authoring the chapter "Biomedical Evidence for Determining Causality" in the Surgeon General's 1982 report Health Consequences of Smoking: Cancer, as well as for advocating for the link between smoking and lung cancer in a 1962 article he wrote for The Nation. In 1976, he and his colleagues began a study investigating the health effects of exposure to microwaves among people in the American embassy in Moscow, USSR.

== Death ==
Lilienfeld died on August 6, 1984, of a heart attack in a Baltimore train station, at the age of 63.

== Recognition ==
In 1970 he was elected as a Fellow of the American Statistical Association.

The American College of Epidemiology's most prestigious award, the "Abraham Lilienfeld Award", has been awarded annually since 1985. The Society for Epidemiologic Research gives the "Lilienfeld Postdoctoral Prize Paper" in honor of Dr. Lilienfeld.
