= Atherosclerosis Risk in Communities =

Clinical trial

The Atherosclerosis Risk in Communities (ARIC) Study is a multi-site, prospective, biracial cohort study funded by the National Heart, Lung, and Blood Institute of the National Institutes of Health. The ARIC Study was designed to investigate the etiology and clinical outcomes of atherosclerosis. A total of 15,792 middle-aged (45–64 years) men and women were enrolled from four U.S. communities:

- Forsyth County, North Carolina
- Jackson, Mississippi
- Suburbs of Minneapolis, Minnesota
- Washington County, Maryland

Participating organizations include four field centers (Wake Forest Baptist Medical Center, University of Mississippi Medical Center, University of Minnesota, Johns Hopkins University), data coordinating center (University of North Carolina at Chapel Hill), and many collaborating centers and laboratories.

The initial study visit took place in 1987-1989, the second in 1990-1992, the third in 1993-1995, the fourth in 1996-1998, and the fifth in 2011-2013. During these extensive examinations, information is obtained on demographics, medical history, medication use, and health behaviors.

To date, the ARIC study has published over 2,300 peer-reviewed journal articles in diverse areas of clinical and population research. Data from the ARIC study have become an important resource for the study of heart disease, kidney disease, diabetes, and cognitive decline. These data have also contributed to clinical practice guidelines and policy statements. ARIC is registered at ClinicalTrials.gov registry under trial identifier NCT00005131.
