= Arnold Monto =

American physician and epidemiologist

Arnold S. Monto FIDSA FACE D(ABMM)
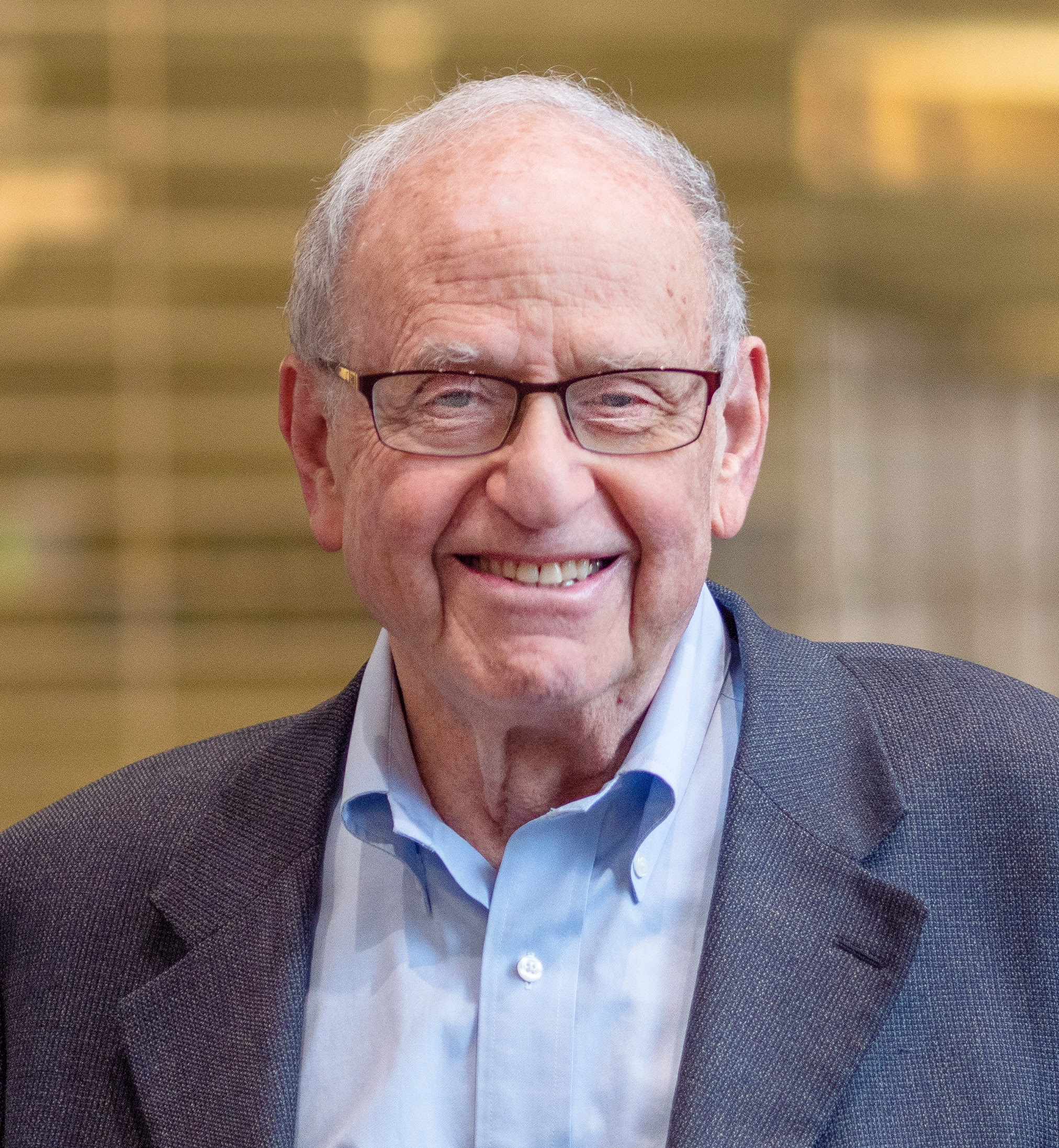
- Born: Brooklyn, New York
- Citizenship: American
- Education: Weill Cornell Medicine (MD); Cornell University (BA)
- Occupations: Physician; epidemiologist; academic
- Years active: 1958–Present
- Known for: Influenza seasonality
- Medical career
- Field: Infectious disease; epidemiology
- Institutions: University of Michigan School of Public Health
- Research: Influenza virus epidemiology
- Awards: Career Development Award, NIH; Charles Merieux Award, National Foundation for Infectious Diseases; Alexander Fleming Lifetime Achievement Award, Infectious Diseases Society of America

Arnold Monto (born March 22, 1933) is an American physician and epidemiologist. At the University of Michigan School of Public Health, Monto is the Thomas Francis, Jr. Collegiate Professor Emeritus of Public Health, a professor emeritus of both epidemiology and global public health, and a co-director of the Michigan Center for Respiratory Virus Research & Response. His research focuses on the occurrence, prevention, and treatment of viral respiratory tract infections in industrialized and developing countries' populations.

== Education ==
Born in Brooklyn, New York City, Monto graduated from Erasmus Hall High School. He received a BA in zoology from Cornell University in 1954 and earned his MD from Cornell University Medical College, now Weill Cornell Medicine, in 1958. From 1958 to 1960, he did his residency training in internal medicine at Vanderbilt University Medical Center. From 1960 to 1962, he completed a United States Public Health Service fellowship in infectious diseases at Stanford University Medical Center.

== Career ==
Monto fulfilled his national service commitment in the Virus Diseases Section of the Middle America Research Unit: a part of the National Institute of Allergy and Infectious Diseases. While there, he began his lifelong interest in respiratory illnesses, confirming that the same viruses that cause illnesses in the temperate climate zones also cause illnesses in the tropics. He was among the first to observe that influenza viruses, in areas where temperatures were stable year-round, mainly occurred in the rainy season. In 1965, Monto was recruited to the University of Michigan School of Public Health by Thomas Francis Jr., chair of and professor in the school's Department of Epidemiology. Monto rose through the academic ranks from research associate to professor. He served as chair of the school's Department of Population Planning and International Health from 1993 to 1996 and as director of the University of Michigan Center for Population Planning. From 2002 to 2004, Monto was director of the University of Michigan Bioterrorism Preparedness Initiative. In 2010, he was named the Thomas Francis Collegiate Professor of Public Health. He is the founder and director of the University of Michigan-Israel Public Health Partnership for Collaborative Research and Education (2014–present) and is co-director of the Michigan Center for Respiratory Virus Research and Response, one of five centers across the country that collects data for the Centers for Disease Control and Prevention. Monto spent periods as a visiting scientist at Northwick Park Hospital Clinical Research Center in Harrow, England; at the World Health Organization in Geneva, working on implications of lower respiratory tract infections globally; and at the National Research Council, Washington, D.C. organizing studies of the causes of respiratory infections in low-resourced countries.

He is the author of over 350 research papers focusing mainly on the epidemiology and implications of respiratory infections, and co-editor of the Textbook of Influenza – Second Edition.

In a career spanning six decades, Monto has been involved in pandemic planning and emergency response to influenza and other respiratory virus outbreaks, including the 1968 Hong Kong influenza pandemic, avian influenza, SARS, MERS, and the COVID-19 pandemic.

In 2015, the U.S. Centers for Disease Control and Prevention established the annual "Arnold S. Monto Award" in honor of Monto for innovation in epidemiology and vaccinology. "Dr. Monto's work has helped us understand the value of measuring vaccine effectiveness in the communities where vaccines are used and taking that data to help enhance influenza prevention programs", said Joe Bresee, Chief of the Epidemiology and Prevention Branch of CDC's Influenza Division."

In 2020, Monto was selected to chair the U.S. Food and Drug Administration Vaccines and Related Biological Products Advisory Committee (VRBPAC) on COVID-19 vaccines.

== Research ==
Throughout his career, Monto has focused on the occurrence, prevention, and control of respiratory infections, with a particular interest in influenza. At the University of Michigan in 1965, he developed the Tecumseh Study of Respiratory Illness, which identified the specific viruses responsible for illnesses in American families over 11 years. During the 1968 influenza pandemic, he found that vaccinating school-age children reduced infection in the entire community, an early demonstration of herd immunity. Subsequently, he was involved in evaluating a variety of strategies to control influenza including vaccines, antivirals, and non-pharmaceutical interventions such as antiseptic tissues and face masks. In particular, he designed and carried out critical studies evaluating the value of the neuraminidase inhibitors now in use for influenza. In the 2000s, he was involved in developing pandemic control strategies, including social distancing, leading to work at the WHO and in the US during the 2009 swine flu pandemic. He also led clinical trials establishing the superiority of inactivated vaccines compared to live attenuated vaccines in preventing influenza in adults.

In 2010, Monto resumed research on community-level respiratory illness epidemiology with the establishment of the Household Influenza Vaccine Evaluation—often referred to by its acronym, HIVE—study, then co-led with Suzanne E. Ohmit (also of the University of Michigan School of Public Health). As of December 2025, the HIVE study is ongoing, with Monto and epidemiology professor Emily T. Martin serving as co-principal investigators; it has been continually funded since its inception. HIVE is a prospective cohort study of households with children living around Ann Arbor, allowing researchers to study the epidemiology, clinical characteristics, and prevention of respiratory illnesses caused by influenza viruses, human parainfluenza viruses, SARS-CoV-2, and RSV, among other pathogens, as they occur naturally in the community over time. The study has yielded several notable findings on natural infection with various viruses and the immune correlates of protection conferred by different influenza vaccines. It was the first to demonstrate the potential problems with the serial use of such vaccines. These issues are now being addressed as part of the Universal Influenza Vaccine Program. Monto was the plenary speaker for a 2017 NIH-led workshop of U.S. and international experts from academia, industry, and government to develop a strategic plan and research agenda aimed at the development of a universal influenza vaccine. The design also allows study over time of other respiratory viruses, including the coronaviruses. Monto is involved in other studies assessing influenza vaccine effectiveness in preventing medical encounters and hospitalization to improve protection. A study in progress addresses the role of antivirals in seasonal and pandemic influenza control.

== Selected service, international and national ==
- Pandemic Influenza Task Force, Infectious Disease Society of America, 2007–present
- Board Member, European Scientific Working Group on Influenza, 2009–2016
- WHO Influenza Pandemic Emergency Committee, 2009–2010
- President's Council of Advisors on Science and Technology H1N1 Working Group, 2009
- Co-chair Neuraminidase Inhibitor Susceptibility Network, 2006–2013
- Co-chair, Infectious Disease Society of America Meetings on Seasonal and Pandemic Influenza, 2006–2010
- Acute Respiratory Infections Subcommittee, US/Japan – Cooperative Medical Science Panel, 2010
- Briefing on Pandemic Influenza, US State Department, Washington, DC, Health Committees of House of Commons and Senate, Ottawa, Canada, 2006–2007
- Advisor, Defense Threat Reduction Agency, U.S. Department of Defense, 2005–2009
- Pulmonary Diseases Advisory Committee, NHLBI, 1979–1983

== Awards ==
- 2012 Charles Merieux Award, National Foundation for Infectious Diseases
- 2009 Alexander Fleming Award for Lifetime Achievement, Infectious Diseases Society of America

== Selected publications ==
- Monto AS, Cavallaro JJ (September 1971). "The Tecumseh study of respiratory illness. II. Patterns of occurrence of infection with respiratory pathogens, 1965-1969". American Journal of Epidemiology. 94 (3): 280–9. doi:10.1093/oxfordjournals.aje.a121321. PMID 4328569.
- Monto AS, Ullman BM (January 1974). "Acute respiratory illness in an American community. The Tecumseh study". JAMA. 227 (2): 164–9. doi:10.1001/jama.1974.03230150016004. PMID 4357298.
- Monto AS, Koopman JS, Longini IM (June 1985). "Tecumseh study of illness. XIII. Influenza infection and disease, 1976-1981". American Journal of Epidemiology. 121 (6): 811–22. doi:10.1093/oxfordjournals.aje.a114052. PMID 4014174.
- Monto AS, Davenport FM, Napier JA, Francis T (1970). "Modification of an outbreak of influenza in Tecumseh, Michigan by vaccination of schoolchildren". The Journal of Infectious Diseases. 122 (1): 16–25. doi:10.1093/infdis/122.1-2.16. PMID 5433709.
- Aiello AE, Murray GF, Perez V, Coulborn RM, Davis BM, Uddin M, Shay DK, Waterman SH, Monto AS (February 2010). "Mask use, hand hygiene, and seasonal influenza-like illness among young adults: a randomized intervention trial". The Journal of Infectious Diseases. 201 (4): 491–8. doi:10.1086/650396. PMID 20088690.
- Monto AS, Robinson DP, Herlocher ML, Hinson JM, Elliott MJ, Crisp A (July 1999). "Zanamivir in the prevention of influenza among healthy adults: a randomized controlled trial". JAMA. 282 (1): 31–5. doi:10.1001/jama.282.1.31. PMID 10404908.
- Monto AS, Black S, Plotkin SA, Orenstein WA (September 2011). "Response to the 2009 pandemic: effect on influenza control in wealthy and poor countries". Vaccine. 29 (38): 6427–31. doi:10.1016/j.vaccine.2011.06.113. PMC 7131421. PMID 21763381.
- Ohmit SE, Victor JC, Rotthoff JR, Teich ER, Truscon RK, Baum LL, Rangarajan B, Newton DW, Boulton ML, Monto AS (December 2006). "Prevention of antigenically drifted influenza by inactivated and live attenuated vaccines". The New England Journal of Medicine. 355 (24): 2513–22. doi:10.1056/NEJMoa061850. PMC 2614682. PMID 17167134.
- Monto AS, Malosh RE, Evans R, Lauring AS, Gordon A, Thompson MG, Fry AM, Flannery B, Ohmit SE, Petrie JG, Martin ET (August 2019). "Data resource profile: Household Influenza Vaccine Evaluation (HIVE) Study". International Journal of Epidemiology. 48 (4): 1040–1040g. doi:10.1093/ije/dyz086. PMC 6693804. PMID 31038700.
- Krammer F, Fouchier RAM, Eichelberger MC, Webby RJ, Shaw-Saliba K, Wan H, Wilson PC, Compans RW, Skountzou I, Monto AS (April 2018). "NAction! How Can Neuraminidase-Based Immunity Contribute to Better Influenza Virus Vaccines?". mBio. 9 (2). doi:10.1128/mBio.02332-17. PMC 5885027. PMID 29615508.
- Petrie JG, Monto AS (March 2017). "Untangling the Effects of Prior Vaccination on Subsequent Influenza Vaccine Effectiveness". The Journal of Infectious Diseases. 215 (6): 841–843. doi:10.1093/infdis/jix056. PMID 28453852.
- Monto AS, Fukuda K (February 2020). "Lessons From Influenza Pandemics of the Last 100 Years". Clinical Infectious Diseases. 70 (5): 951–957. doi:10.1093/cid/ciz803. PMC 7314237. PMID 31420670.
