= American Journal of Epidemiology =

- Discipline: Public health, Medicine
- Language: English language
- Edited by: Enrique Schisterman

Publication details
- Publisher: Oxford University Press for the Johns Hopkins Bloomberg School of Public Health ( (United States) )
- Frequency: Monthly
- Impact factor: 4.897 (2020)

Standard abbreviations
- ISO 4: Am. J. Epidemiol.

Indexing
- ISSN: 0002-9262 (print); 1476-6256 (web)

Links
- Journal homepage

The American Journal of Epidemiology (AJE) is a peer-reviewed journal for empirical research findings, opinion pieces, and methodological developments in the field of epidemiological research. The current editor-in-chief is Enrique Schisterman.

Articles published in AJE are indexed by PubMed, Embase, and a number of other databases. The AJE offers open-access options for authors. It is published monthly, with articles published online ahead of print at the accepted manuscript and corrected proof stages. Entire issues have been dedicated to abstracts from academic meetings (Society of Epidemiologic Research, North American Congress of Epidemiology), the history of the Epidemic Intelligence Service of the Centers for Disease Control and Prevention (CDC), the life of George W. Comstock, and the celebration of notable anniversaries of schools of public health (University of California, Berkeley, School of Public Health; Tulane University School of Public Health and Tropical Medicine; Johns Hopkins Bloomberg School of Public Health).

AJE is currently ranked 5th in the field of epidemiology according to Google Scholar. It has an impact factor of 4.897 (as of 2020), and the 5-year impact factor is 5.827 according to Journal Citation Reports.

== History ==
This journal was founded in 1920 and originally named the American Journal of Hygiene. In 1965, the Journal acquired its current name, American Journal of Epidemiology. Since its inception, the Journal has been based in the Department of Epidemiology at Johns Hopkins Bloomberg School of Public Health and is published in association with the Society of Epidemiologic Research.

== Editors-in-chief ==
- William H. Welch (1920–1927)
- Roscoe Hyde (1927–1938)
- Martin Frobisher (1938–1948)
- David Bodian (1948–1957)
- Philip E. Sartwell (1957–1958)
- Abraham G. Osler (1958–1965)
- Neal Nathanson (1965–1979)
- George W. Comstock (1979–1988)
- Moyses Szklo (1988–2019)
- Enrique Schisterman (2019–present)
