= Johns Hopkins Bloomberg School of Public Health =

Graduate school in Baltimore, Maryland, US

Coordinates: 39.29785°N 76.590757°W

- Motto: Protecting Health, Saving Lives – Millions at a Time
- Type: Private public health graduate school
- Established: 1916
- Parent institution: Johns Hopkins University
- Endowment: $632 million (2022)
- Dean: Keshia Pollack Porter
- Faculty: 875 primary, 833 affiliated
- Students: 3,639
- Location: Baltimore, Maryland, U.S.
- Campus: Urban
- Website: publichealth.jhu.edu

The Johns Hopkins Bloomberg School of Public Health is the public health graduate school of Johns Hopkins University, a private research university primarily based in Baltimore, Maryland.

It was founded as the Johns Hopkins School of Hygiene and Public Health in 1916. As of 2024, it claims 16% of all grants and contracts awarded to the 60 accredited schools of public health in the United States, and offers twenty-eight graduate degree programs across ten departments, included nine master's programs, two doctoral programs, and seventeen combined/dual degree programs.

The Bloomberg School is located on the Johns Hopkins medical campus in East Baltimore, adjacent to the Johns Hopkins School of Medicine, the Johns Hopkins Hospital, and the School of Nursing.

== History ==
In 1913, the Rockefeller Foundation sponsored a conference on the need for public health education in the United States. Foundation officials were convinced that a new profession of public health was needed. It would be allied to medicine but also distinct, with its own identity and educational institutions. The result of deliberations between public health leaders and foundation officials was the Welch–Rose Report of 1915, which laid out the need for adequately trained public health workers, and envisioned an "institute of hygiene" for the United States. The report reflected the different preferences of the plan's two architects—William Henry Welch favored scientific research, whereas Wickliffe Rose wanted an emphasis on public health practice.

In June 1916, the executive committee of the Rockefeller Foundation approved the plan to organize an institute or school of public health at Johns Hopkins University in Baltimore, Maryland, United States. The institute was named the School of Hygiene and Public Health, indicating a compromise between those who wanted the practical public health training on the British model and those who favored basic scientific research on the German model. Welch, the first dean of the Johns Hopkins School of Medicine, also became the founding dean of the School of Public Health.

The facility is located on the former Maryland Hospital site founded in 1797. The Maryland Hospital was originally built as a hospital to care for Yellow Fever for the indigent away from the city. In 1840, the hospital expanded to exclusively care for the mentally ill. In 1873, the buildings were torn down as the facility relocated to a new site as the Spring Grove Hospital Center.

On April 20, 2001, the school was renamed the Johns Hopkins Bloomberg School of Public Health in honor of businessman and Hopkins alumnus Michael Bloomberg for his financial support and commitment to the school and Johns Hopkins University. Bloomberg would later go on to serve two terms as Mayor of New York City and run a campaign in the 2020 Democratic Party presidential primaries.

The school is also the founder of Delta Omega (est. 1924), the national honorary society for graduate training in public health.

=== Leaders ===
The official title of the head of the school has changed periodically between director and dean throughout the years. Originally the title was director. In 1931, it was changed to dean and in 1946 back to director. In 1958, the title again became dean. The directors and deans of the Bloomberg School include:

1. William H. Welch (1916–1927)
2. William Henry Howell (1927–1931)
3. Wade Hampton Frost (1931–1934)
4. Allen W. Freeman (1934–1937)
5. Lowell Reed (1937–1947)
6. Ernest L. Stebbins (1947–1967)
7. John C. Hume (1967–1977)
8. Donald A. Henderson (1977–1990)
9. Alfred Sommer (1990–2005)
10. Michael J. Klag (2005–2017)
11. Ellen J. MacKenzie (2017–2025)
12. Keshia Pollack Porter (2025-present)

== Reputation and ranking ==
The Bloomberg School has 875 primary and 833 affiliated faculty, and 3,639 students from 97 countries. It is home to over 80 research centers and institutes with research ongoing in the U.S. and more than 60 countries worldwide. Since the U.S News and World Report began ranking school of public health in 1991, the Bloomberg School has consistently been ranked first. The school is ranked second for public health in the world by EduRank and Shanghai Rankings, behind the Harvard T.H. Chan School of Public Health.

== Academic degrees and departments ==
The school offers master's degrees, doctoral degrees, postdoctoral training, and residency programs in general preventive medicine and occupational medicine. and combined and certificate training programs in various areas of public health. It is composed of 10 academic departments:

- Biochemistry and Molecular Biology
- Biostatistics
- Environmental Health and Engineering
- Epidemiology: has the largest overall postdoctoral training program in the School of Public Health. Many postdoctoral fellows and predoctoral trainees (master's level and doctoral level degree students) are supported by NIH-funded training programs. Affiliated centers and institutes include George W. Comstock Center for Public Health Research and Prevention and the Wendy Klag Center for Autism and Developmental Disabilities.
- Health, Behavior and Society
- Health Policy and Management
- International Health
- Mental Health
- Molecular Microbiology and Immunology
- Population, Family and Reproductive Health

== Campus ==
The Bloomberg School of Public Health is located in the East Baltimore campus of the Johns Hopkins University. The campus, collectively known as the Johns Hopkins Medical Institutions (JHMI), is also home to the School of Medicine and the School of Nursing and comprises several city blocks, radiating outwards from the Billings Building of the Johns Hopkins Hospital with its historic dome. The main building on which the school is located is on North Wolfe Street; it has nine floors and features an observation area and a fitness center on the top floor. The Bloomberg School also occupies Hampton House on North Broadway. The school is also serviced by the Welch Medical Library, a central resource shared by all the schools of the Medical Campus. The campus includes the Lowell Reed Residence Hall and the Denton Cooley Recreational Center. Public transportation to and from the campus is served by the Baltimore Metro Subway, local buses, and the JHMI shuttle.

== Notable people ==
=== Faculty and Alumni ===
- Virginia Apgar: notable for the Apgar test and research in anesthesiology, and teratology; founder of the field of neonatology
- Margaret G. Arnstein: Chief of the U.S. Public Health Service Division of Nursing, Dean of Yale School of Nursing, Lasker Public Service Award
- Leroy Edgar Burney: 8th Surgeon General of the United States, first to publicly identify cigarette smoke as a cause of lung cancer
- Marcolino Gomes Candau: 2nd Director-General of the World Health Organization (WHO) from 1953 to 1973
- Chen Chien-jen: Premier (2023-2024) and Vice President (2016-2020) of the Republic of China
- George W. Comstock: epidemiologist, pioneer of tuberculosis control and treatment
- H.R. Cox: bacteriologist and namesake of the bacterial genus Coxiella, the cause of Q fever
- Donald A. Henderson: eradication of smallpox, Presidential Medal of Freedom, former Dean 1977–1990
- Alexander Langmuir: epidemiologist, founder of the Epidemic Intelligence Service
- Abraham Lilienfeld: "father of contemporary chronic disease epidemiology"
- Elmer McCollum, biochemist and nutrition advocate, co-discovered Vitamins A, B, and D
- Antonia Novello: 14th Surgeon General of the United States (1990-1993), first woman and first Hispanic with the position
- Alfred Sommer: nutritionist who discovered efficacy of Vitamin A in reducing child mortality, former Dean 1990–2005
- Fred Soper: epidemiologist, directed Rockefeller Foundation programs to eradicate malaria and urban yellow fever, Lasker Public Service Award
- Laurie Schwab Zabin: leading figure in the field of adolescent reproductive health, family planning, sexual behaviors, and abortion trends

== Publications ==
- American Journal of Epidemiology
- Epidemiologic Reviews
- Progress in Community Health Partnerships: Research, Education, and Action (PCHP)
- Journal of Health Care for the Poor and Underserved
- Hopkins Bloomberg Public Health Magazine
