= Dorothy King (disambiguation) =

Dorothy King (born 1975) is an American archaeologist and historian.

Dorothy King may also refer to:

- Dorothy King, victim of killing of Dot King in 1923
- Dorothy King (artist) (1907–1990), British artist, curator and teacher
- Dorothy Stratton King (1909–2007), American artist
- Sheila Dorothy King (born 1932), Jamaican physician
