= Jean Martin (disambiguation) =

Jean Martin (1922–2009) was a French actor.

Jean Martin may also refer to:

- Jean Martin (singer), (1919–2004), American singer and actor
- Jean Martin (sociologist) (1923–1979), Australian sociologist
- Jean Martin (pianist) (1927–2020), French pianist
- Jean Martin (composer) (dates unknown), classical music composer
- Jean Joseph Martin, French bow maker
- Jean Martin Pinder (1916–2014), American nurse
