= Megan Ranney =

American emergency physician

Megan L. Ranney
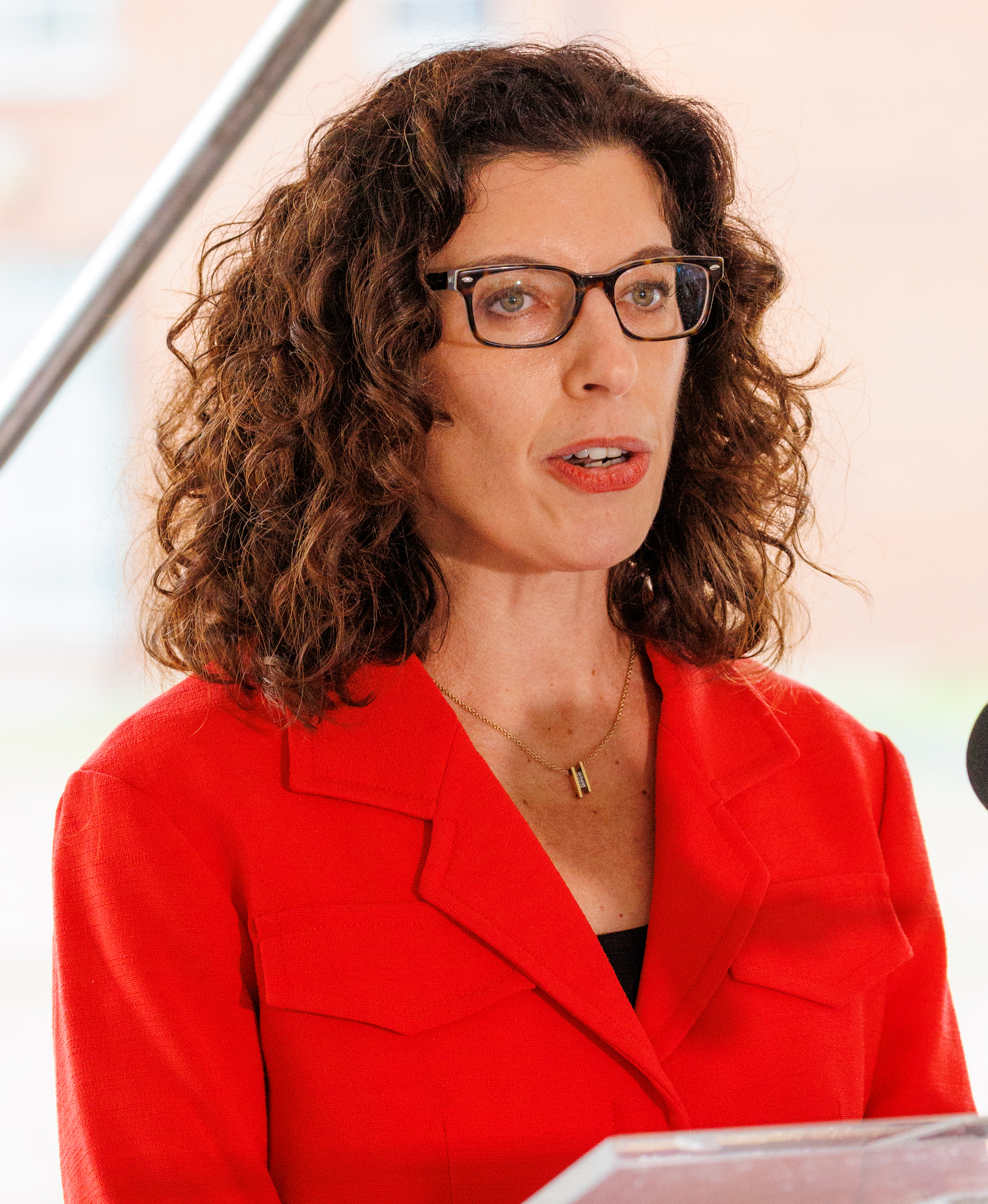
- Ranney in 2022

Dean of the Yale School of Public Health
- Incumbent
- Assumed office July 1, 2023

Personal details
- Education: Harvard University (BA); Columbia University (MD); Brown University (MPH)
- Website: Official bio

Academic background
- Thesis: Surveys in injury research : their application to unintentional and intentional injury prevention (2010)

Megan L. Ranney is a practicing American emergency physician currently serving as the Dean of the Yale School of Public Health. Previously, Ranney served as the Deputy Dean of the Brown University School of Public Health, was Warren Alpert Endowed Professor in the Department of Emergency Medicine at Rhode Island Hospital and the Alpert Medical School of Brown University. Ranney was the founding Director of the Brown-Lifespan Center for Digital Health.

During the COVID-19 pandemic, Ranney brought public attention to the deficit of protective equipment for United States frontline workers. She launched the grassroots organization #GetUsPPE to collect, create and distribute personal protective equipment around the United States.

== Early life and education ==
Ranney graduated summa cum laude from Harvard University with a Bachelor of Arts in the history of science in 1997. After graduation, Ranney joined the Peace Corps, where she supported programs in the Ivory Coast. Ranney then attended the Columbia University Vagelos College of Physicians and Surgeons, from which she graduated with an M.D. as a member of both Alpha Omega Alpha and the Gold Humanism Honor Society. She completed her internship, residency and chief residency in emergency medicine at Brown. Ranney earned her Master's in Public Health in 2010 from the Brown University School of Public Health where she studied injury prevention.

== Career ==
Ranney worked as a physician at Rhode Island Hospital in Providence, where she witnessed the consequences of gun violence. She used her background to start conversations about guns in the context of public health. Ranney helped found the American Foundation for Firearm Injury Reduction in Medicine, for which she serves as research officer. The following year, Ranney delivered a TED talk where she discussed how healthcare professionals can help to solve America's gun problem. Ranney has advocated for increased investment in community violence prevention programs and other interventions that move beyond gun control laws.

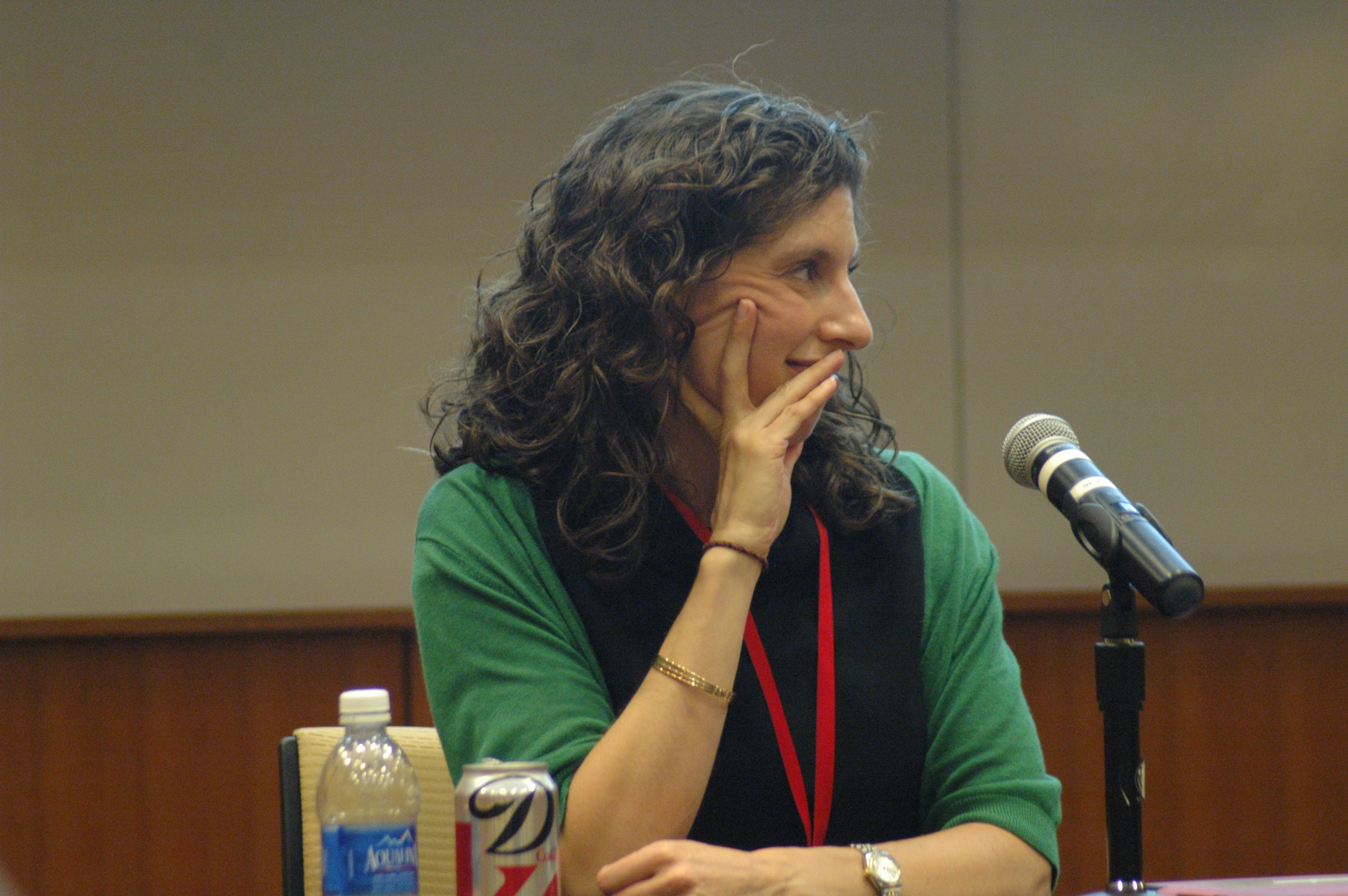
Ranney speaks at a panel at Harvard Medical School in 2012

=== #GetUsPPE ===
During the COVID-19 pandemic, Ranney drew public attention to the lack of personal protective equipment (PPE) available for frontline staff. Ranney pointed out that alongside escalating SARS-CoV-2 patient numbers, the protocols, treatment options and Centers for Disease Control (CDC) recommendations changed frequently. Ranney described shortages in PPE in The New England Journal of Medicine, where she called for Donald Trump to invoke the Defense Production Act to spur private companies to manufacture PPE. She called on private-sector companies to expand manufacturing of N95 masks, and suggested the Food and Drug Administration relax regulations to allow healthcare workers faster access to protective clothing. She has asked whether local governments could better coordinate the collection of PPE from existing stockpiles. In March 2020, Ranney submitted recommendations to the federal government of the United States on what priorities should be included in the CARES Act. Her recommendations included focusing on health security, protecting the health of all American's, particularly those from minoritised backgrounds, and to invest money in public health initiatives.

Ranney worked with Shuhan He, a doctor at Massachusetts General Hospital, to create the organisation #GetUsPPE. GetUsPPE is a grassroots collective of engineers, medical professionals and volunteers who look to locate, create and distribute equipment to Americans in need. #GetUsPPE called for the public to donate money and resources to protect frontline physicians. Amongst other donations, Ranney collected 4,000 N95 masks from colleagues at Brown University.

In March 2020 Ranney lost her colleague, Frank Gabrin, to the coronavirus disease. He was the first emergency doctor to die from such symptoms. Ranney was quoted by Meet the Press as saying, "He was a leader within the emergency room field. ... Unless our government steps up & gets us the protective equipment we need, he will be the first of many of my colleagues".

In February 2021, Ranney was named Associate Dean for Strategy and Innovation for the Brown University School of Public Health. In December she became the school's Academic Dean.

== Yale School of Public Health ==
In July 2023, Ranney began her term as dean of the Yale School of Public Health.

== Awards and honors ==
- 2022: Ranney was elected to the National Academy of Medicine
- 2021: Ranney was named "2020 RI Woman of the Year" by GoLocalProv, a Rhode Island business publication.
- 2018: Ranney was awarded the Bruce M. Selya Award for Excellence in Research by Lifespan hospitals

== Personal life ==
Ranney is married to Chuck Ranney, with whom she has two children.
