= University of the West Indies Museum =

Coordinates: 18.0024°N 76.7503°W

The University of the West Indies Museum, commonly called the UWI Museum, was established in 2012. Its focus is the history and development of the University of the West Indies, and its relationship to the West Indies – now more commonly known as the Caribbean – region, which it serves. The university was itself established in the late 1940s, based on recommendations from the Irvine Committee of the British Asquith Commission on Higher Education in the Colonies. Then called the University College of the West Indies (UCWI), the new West Indian university took its first students in October 1948 – 33 young men and women from across the region, hoping to swell the number of doctors available to the region's people.

The UWI Museum has made the UWI's Origins the focus of its first semi-permanent exhibition, but also presents cameo exhibitions on other relevant topics. These have included academic dress and the relationship of Caribbean people to regionalism. The museum was established under the auspices of the UWI's Vice Chancellor, its highest-ranking administrator, and is located in the UWI Regional Headquarters building at Mona, Jamaica.
