= University of the West Indies =

International university in the Caribbean

Coordinates: 18.0029784°N 76.744566°W

- Motto: Latin: Oriens Ex Occidente Lux
- Motto in English: "A Light Rising From The West"
- Type: Regional university, public, autonomous
- Established: 1948; 78 years ago
- Affiliations: Association of Commonwealth Universities (ACU); Caribbean Community
- Chancellor: Dr. Dodridge Miller
- Vice-Chancellor: Professor Sir Hilary Beckles
- Faculty: 1,200
- Students: near 50,000 (across 5 campuses)
- Campus: Mona, Jamaica (headquarters)
Colors
- Mascot: The Pelican
- Website: uwi.edu

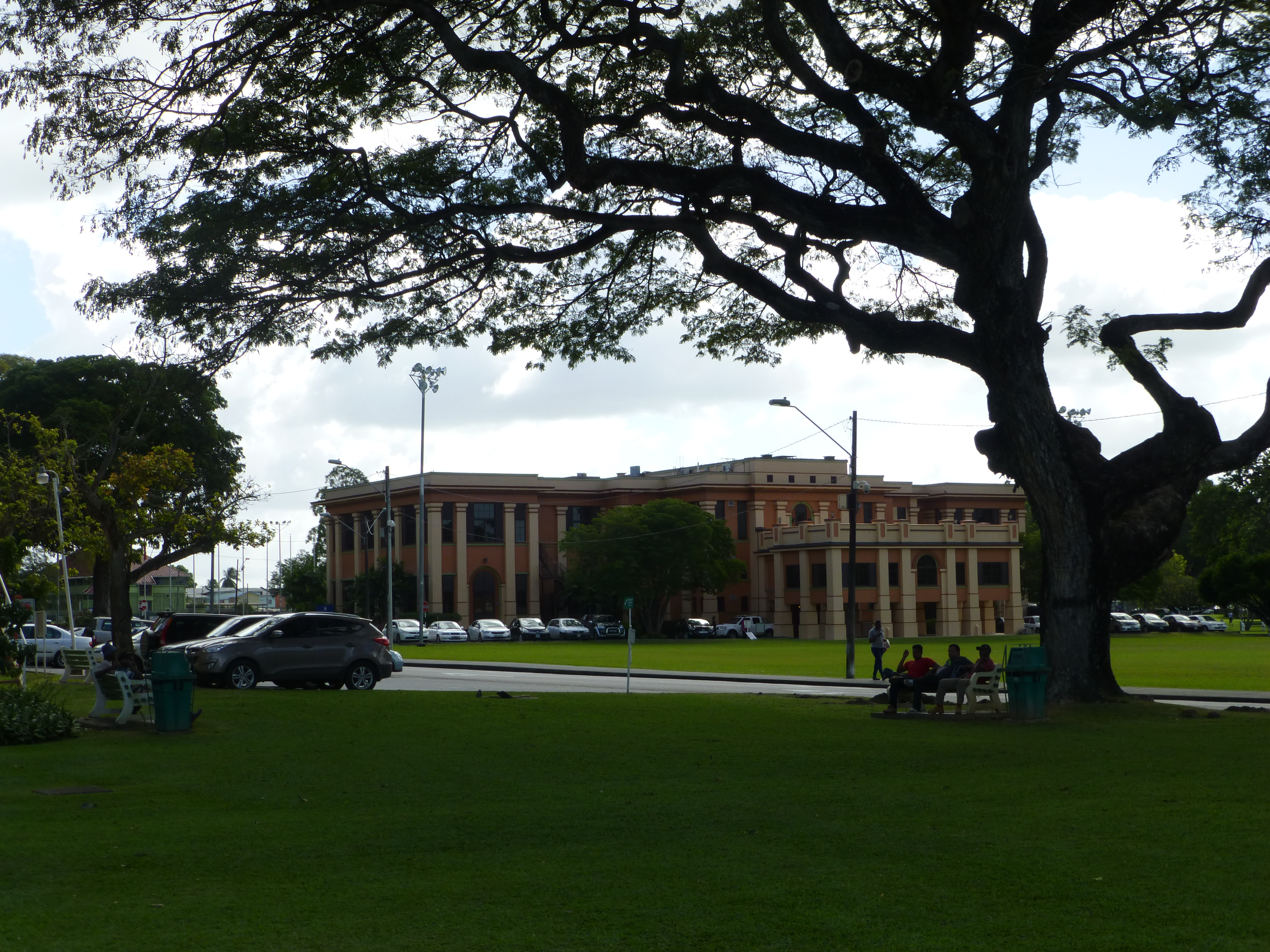
St. Augustine, Trinidad and Tobago UWI Campus

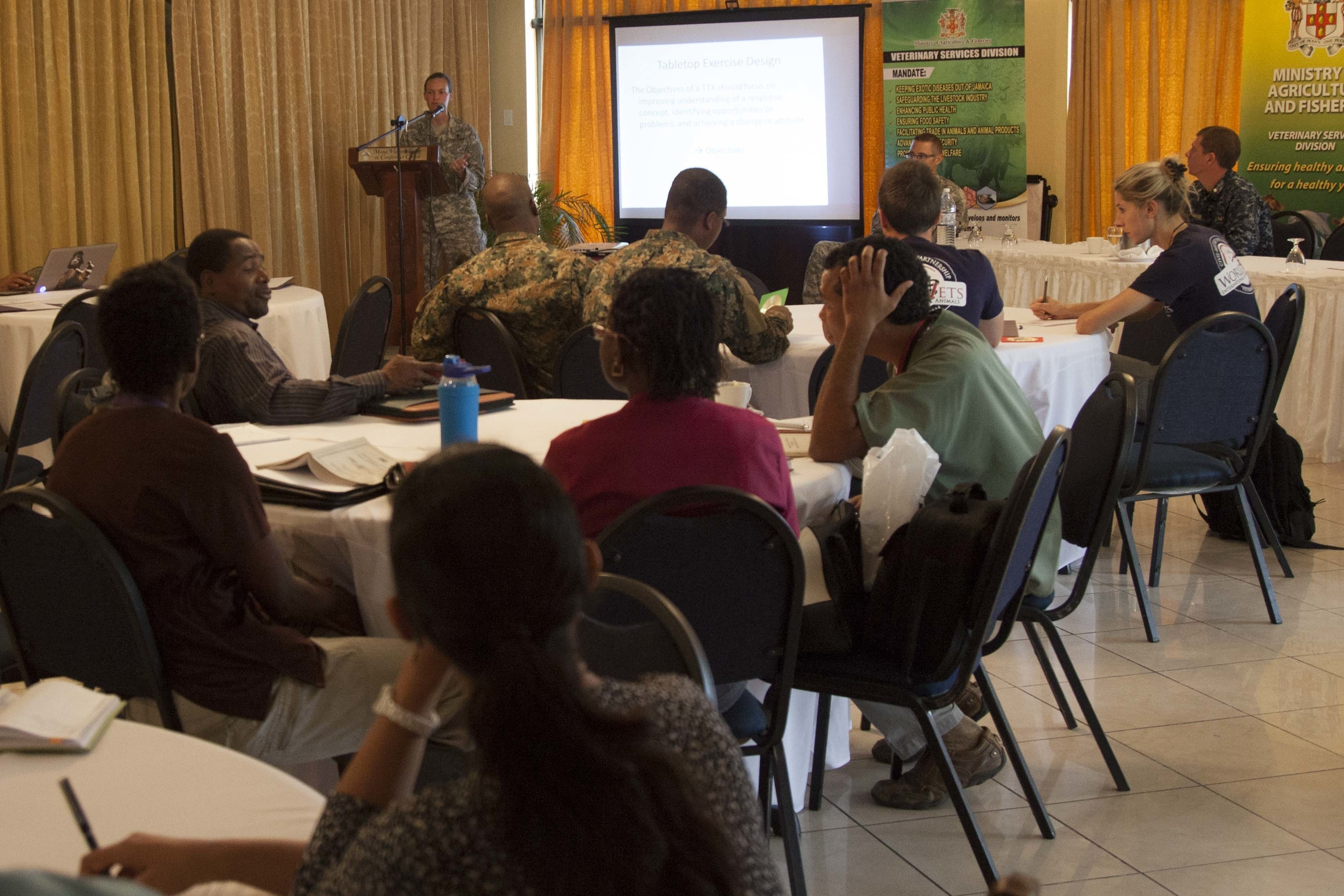

The University of the West Indies (UWI), originally known as the University College of the West Indies, is a public university system established to serve the higher education needs of the residents of 18 English-speaking countries and territories in the Caribbean. (Note: Namely Anguilla, Antigua and Barbuda, The Bahamas, Barbados, Belize, Bermuda, British Virgin Islands, Cayman Islands, Dominica, Grenada, Guyana, Jamaica, Montserrat, Saint Kitts and Nevis, Saint Lucia, Saint Vincent and the Grenadines, Trinidad and Tobago, and Turks and Caicos Islands.) Each country is either a member of the Commonwealth of Nations or a British Overseas Territory.

The university has five major university centres: UWI Mona (Jamaica), UWI Cave Hill (Barbados), UWI St. Augustine (Trinidad and Tobago), UWI Five Islands (Antigua and Barbuda), and the regional UWI Global Campus in the UWI-funding Caribbean nations. The UWI campus in Mona, Jamaica, served as the flagship campus and headquarters of the University of the West Indies.

The aim of the university is to help "unlock the potential for economic and cultural growth" in the West Indies, thus allowing improved regional autonomy. The university was originally instituted as an independent external college of the University of London.

== History ==
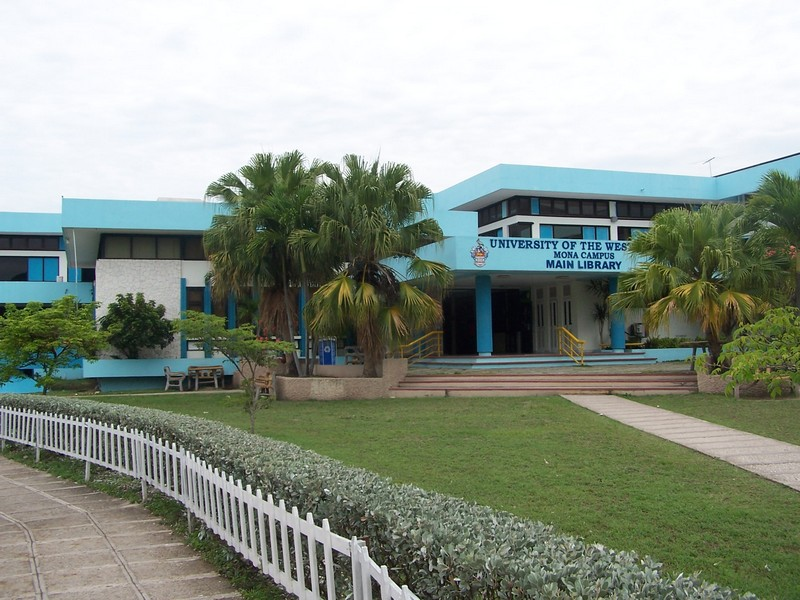
Main Library, Mona Campus, Jamaica

The university was founded in 1948, on the recommendation of the Asquith Commission through its sub-committee on the West Indies, chaired by Sir James Irvine. The Asquith Commission had been established in 1943 to review the provision of higher education in the British colonies. Initially in a special relationship with the University of London, the then University College of the West Indies (UCWI) was seated at Mona, about five miles from Kingston, Jamaica. The university was based at Gibraltar Camp, used by evacuated Gibraltarians during the war.

Seeking to address a need for medical care, the first faculty established a medical school. The foundation stone for a hospital was added in 1949, and the University College Hospital of the West Indies opened in 1953. On 18 January 1953, Sir Winston Churchill visited the hospital and unveiled a plaque in recognition of the contribution made by the government of the United Kingdom to the hospital. The hospital was renamed the University Hospital of the West Indies in 1967 when the university gained full university status. In addition to patient care, the hospital facilitates research and teaching, along with the Medical Services department of the Mona campus of the University of the West Indies.

The University College achieved independent university status in 1962. The St. Augustine Campus in Trinidad, formerly the Imperial College of Tropical Agriculture (ICTA), was established in 1960, followed by a school established along University Row, at the Deep Water Harbour of Barbados in 1963, later seated at the present Cave Hill Campus in 1967. The Open Campus, University Centres, headed by a Resident Tutor, were established in each of the other 13 contributing territories thereafter.

In 1950, Princess Alice, Countess of Athlone, Queen Victoria's last surviving granddaughter, became the first Chancellor of the University College of the West Indies.

Sir William Arthur Lewis was the first Vice-Chancellor under the UWI's independent Charter. A native of St Lucia, he served as the first West Indian Principal of the UCWI from 1958 to 1960 and as Vice-Chancellor from 1960 to 1963. He was succeeded by Sir Philip Sherlock (a Jamaican and one of UWI's founding fathers) who served as Vice-Chancellor from 1963 to 1969. Sir Roy Marshall, a Barbadian, was the next Vice-Chancellor, serving from 1969 to 1974. He was succeeded in that year by Aston Zachariah Preston, a Jamaican, who died in office on 24 June 1986. The fifth Vice-Chancellor was Sir Alister McIntyre, who served from 1988 to 1998, followed by alumnus and Professor Emeritus Rex Nettleford, who served from 1998 to 2004. The current Vice-Chancellor is Professor Sir Hilary Beckles, who succeeded Professor E. Nigel Harris in May 2015.

The University of the West Indies Museum catalogues and exhibits some of the university's history.

== University system ==
The UWI is the largest education provider in the Commonwealth Caribbean, with five constituent campuses:

Colour	Campus	Country	Established
	Mona	Jamaica	1948
	St. Augustine	Trinidad and Tobago	1960
	Cave Hill	Barbados	1963
	Global Campus	Multiple ^{α}	2007
	Five Islands	Antigua and Barbuda	2019

The following are the satellite campuses of the university system:

- Mount Hope Campus in Mount Hope, Trinidad and Tobago (houses the Faculty of Medical Sciences of UWI St. Augustine)
- St. Augustine South Campus at Debe in the Penal–Debe region, Trinidad and Tobago (extension campus of UWI St. Augustine)
- Western Jamaica Campus in Montego Bay, Jamaica (extension campus of UWI Mona)
- Centre for Hotel and Tourism Management in Nassau, Bahamas (extension campus of UWI Mona)
- School of Clinical Medicine and Research in Nassau, Bahamas (extension of the medical programme at UWI St. Augustine)

The other contributing countries are served by the Open Campus.

=== Proposals and programs ===
There have been various proposals to add one or more campuses in other nations, including a campus at Hope, Grenada, Suzhou, China, the Johannesburg Institute for Global African Affairs, and collaboration with the University of Havana. In 2020 the University of the West Indies and Brock University founded the Canada-Caribbean Institute (CCI) to connect academic institutions, scholars, the business and public sectors, civil society, the cultural and diaspora communities. Since it has expanded to a growing cadre of educational entities.

In addition to programmes offered directly by one of the faculties of the university, the UWI extends accessibility to its programmes through articulation agreements and franchise arrangements with regional institutions. In many of these arrangements, students are able to study in their home countries for the first one or two years before going to a landed campus for the third (and fourth) year. In the case of articulation agreements, the local institution develops its own programme and the UWI agrees to recognise it as equivalent to the first year or two of a specific UWI programme. In the case of a franchise programme, the local institution delivers exactly the programme as offered by UWI. This is usually the first year or two, but can be the full bachelor's degree on occasion.

=== Global initiatives ===
The University of the West Indies has initiated several international partnerships. In 2016, UWI and the Global Institute for Software Technology (GIST) established the UWI-China Institute for Information Technology. Starting in the summer of 2018, students in the programme on the Cave Hill and Mona campuses will travel to Suzhou, China for two years to study software engineering and Mandarin.

The UWI-SUNY Center for Leadership and Sustainable Development (CLSD) was established in 2017 on SUNY's Empire State campus in Manhattan. The centre is designed to assist the Commonwealth Caribbean in meeting the United Nations Sustainable Development Goals. In addition to research and advocacy, plans were underway as of 2019 to offer a joint master's degree in sustainability and leadership.

In 2017, the University of Lagos (UNILAG) and the UWI established the UNILAG-UWI Institute of African and Diaspora Studies. The institute conducts research and offers a master's degree in African and Diaspora Studies.

Also in 2017, UWI and the University of Johannesburg (UJ) signed a memorandum of agreement (MoA) to establish the Institute for Global Africa Affairs. The institute was launched in 2018 and will offer a joint master's degree in Global African Studies.

In 2019, Universidad de los Andes, commonly referred to as UNIANDES, and the UWI established the Strategic Alliance for Hemispheric Development. The Alliance will focus on the development of joint academic programmes and collaborative research projects.

In 2020, UWI and the University of Havana inked an agreement to jointly establish the Institute for the Sustainable Development of the Caribbean. UWI Mona will lead the initiative from the UWI side, with the deans of the Faculty of Science and Technology and the dean of the Faculty of Medical Sciences taking the lead.

In 2021 the Inter-American Development Bank decided to become a stakeholder of UWI under Cuban-American President Mauricio Claver-Carone as a public-private partnerships, [PPP).

== Faculties ==
The University of the West Indies is a multi-campus, international university with several faculties and schools, some replicated on all four physical main campuses. The Open Campus does not have a faculty structure. The distribution of the faculties (called schools at Five Islands) is listed below.

Cave Hill Campus	Five Islands Campus	Mona Campus	St. Augustine Campus
Humanities & Education	Humanities & Education	Humanities & Education	Humanities & Education
Law		Law	Law
Medical Sciences	Health & Behavioural Sciences	Medical Sciences	Medical Sciences
Science & Technology	Science, Computing, & Artificial Intelligence	Science & Technology	Science & Technology
Social Sciences		Social Sciences	Social Sciences
Sport		Sport	Sport
		Engineering	Engineering
			Agricultural Sciences & Sustainability
Culture, Creative and Performing Arts			
	Business & Management		

A new Faculty of Culture, Creative and Performing Arts was approved to be established on 1 August 2020 at the Cave Hill Campus.

=== Faculty of Medical Sciences ===
Prior to the establishment of a medical school in the Caribbean, most physicians were trained in the United Kingdom, with a smaller group trained in the United States. This was costly, not attuned to the specific needs of the communities the doctors would serve, and risked the newly minted physicians remaining in the countries they trained in.

The Faculty of Medical Sciences was the first faculty to be established in the then University College. This was because of the pressing need for more (locally trained) doctors to treat conditions such as tuberculosis, yaws, tetanus, typhoid, infant malnutrition, and illnesses related to diarrhea. The establishment of medical schools in the colonies was replicated in the Gold Coast, Nigeria, Rhodesia, and Uganda. The inaugural entering class of 1948 consisted of 33 students from across the Caribbean, selected from 600–800 applicants. As the university college was then affiliated with the University of London, the medical curriculum reflected the University of London's curriculum with the addition of preventive and tropical medicine. Degrees were awarded under the University of London until 1962, reflecting London's role in administering the programme and providing the teaching staff. In addition to the standard five-year course, a pre-course science year was required for students without adequate preparation. The University Hospital of the West Indies, an acute tertiary hospital, provided the initial context for clinical education.

Expansion of the capacity of the Faculty followed several steps. In addition to population growth, the exodus of medical graduates to North America, never to return, exacerbated the need to increase the output of doctors. In the 1960s, it was possible to complete the clinical clerkship element of training in Trinidad and Tobago (at the Port of Spain General Hospital), Barbados (at the Queen Elizabeth Hospital, Bridgetown), as well as in Jamaica. In 1989, the medical school at the St. Augustine campus opened. However, it adopted a problem-based approach rather than the 'traditional' existing curriculum at the Mona school. Mona, which had previously implemented curricular reforms based on World Health Organization recommendations to emphasize community health promotion and protection, and St. Augustine had different medical school curricula, although the graduates took the same qualifying exams. Moreover, St. Augustine's Faculty of Medical Sciences included not just a school of medicine but also schools of dentistry, veterinary medicine, nursing, and pharmacy, necessitating some resource-sharing. In 2008, the clerkships in Barbados were fully developed into a medical school at the Cave Hill campus. Around the same time, the UWI School of Clinical Medicine and Research was established from an existing programme allowing clerkships to be undertaken in Nassau, under the direction of the St. Augustine campus. The School offers the final two years of the five-year programme.

==== Specialist medical training ====
Similar to the general training, specialist training was progressively made available through the UWI. For example, anaesthesia was initially provided by untrained physicians, nurses, and pharmacists, leading to high morbidity and mortality rates. Initially, physicians were sent overseas for a year of post-graduate training. While the Faculty was established in 1948, the one-year post-graduate diploma in anaesthetics did not begin until 1966 at the Mona campus. St. Augustine and Cave Hill added the diploma in 1976. However, Mona was already pursuing a four-year doctorate program in anaesthetics, first offered in 1974. Eventually, this more specialised degree (extended to include intensive care) was extended to the other two campuses in 1984, while the one-year programme was discontinued in 1994.

While improvements were being made to the training of physicians as anaesthesiologists, there continued to be a shortage of trained personnel in rural areas. In Jamaica, an initiative to train nurse anaesthetists started, with nurses first sent to the US and Cuba, followed by the establishment of the Jamaica School of Nurse Anaesthetists in 1981, which continues to this day (As of 2019) with the Ministry of Health. This is in addition to specialised additional training for nurses in intensive care, which began in 1969.

==== Dentist training ====
Two of the three faculties of medical sciences offer dentistry. The St. Augustine campus was the first to offer a dental school. It opened in 1989 as the first dental school in the Anglophone Caribbean. The inaugural class of roughly 20 students was mostly from Trinidad and Tobago, with a couple of students each from Jamaica and St. Vincent and the Grenadines. The initial curriculum was modeled on that found in the UK, with the intention to seek recognition from British authorities. It is possible to the exam for membership of the Faculty of Dental Surgery of the Edinburgh-based Royal College of Surgeons.

==== Accreditation ====
Starting in 2004, the medical programs in the Caribbean ceased to be accredited by the United Kingdom-based General Medical Council as the UK focused more on integration with Europe. UWI was a key player in the establishment of the Caribbean Accreditation Authority for Education in Medicine and other Health Professions (CAAM-HP). Despite differences in curriculum, the three UWI medical schools are accredited and currently certified with conditions. The dental school at St. Augustine is probationary accredited while the dental school at Mona has accreditation with conditions. The veterinarian medical school at St. Augustine is also accredited with conditions. Efforts are underway to align the curriculum and admission standards of the three medical schools.

==== Regional competition ====
Even with the expansion, the UWI medical schools are facing new competition. Many for-profit medical schools have been established in the Caribbean region, with the first established in Grenada in 1976. Generally, these schools cater to students from the United States, but they sometimes offer scholarships to local students, providing an alternative to UWI programs or going abroad for medical education to Canada, the United Kingdom, or the United States. The quality of these offshore medical schools differ, though the CAAM-HP accredits some.

==== Research ====
The Faculty of Medicines has a research arm called the Caribbean Institute for Health Research (CAIHR), formerly the Tropical Medicine Research Institute (TMRI). The CAIHR comprises the George Alleyne Chronic Disease Research Centre, based on the Cave Hill Campus, and three units all based on the Mona Campus: the Tropical Metabolism Research Unit, the Sickle Cell Unit and the Epidemiology Research Unit. Continuing medical education is provided in different ways among the various countries with the medical associations taking the lead in some countries and the medical schools in others.

=== Faculty of Law ===
Prior to the establishment of the Faculty of Law at the UWI, residents of the anglophone Caribbean would travel primarily to the United Kingdom to study. There, a prospective lawyer would join one of the Inns of Court, receiving lodging and training and undergoing examinations. The training focused on England's legal system and social context, which did not correspond to legal practice in the Caribbean. It was also expensive. For the legal profession in England, the influx of prospective lawyers from around the British Commonwealth was beginning to strain resources. Efforts were underway to limit international students in legal studies in England, which was another reason to establish legal training in the Caribbean.

The Faculty of Law was initially established in 1970 at the Cave Hill Campus, in Barbados, but the first year of the degree was available at each campus (and the University of Guyana in Guyana). This structure served, inter alia, to create a regional institution (the Faculty) and a regional identity within the profession. Incrementally, courses from the second and third year of the law programs were introduced at St. Augustine and Mona, allowing students to take more and more of the degree on those campuses rather than studying at Cave Hill. It is now possible to complete a law degree at each campus.

Following completion of the UWI law degree, graduates who intend to practice must complete a two-year practical professional training programme at one of three law schools in the Caribbean. The Eugene Dupuch Law School in The Bahamas usually is for citizens of the Bahamas, the British Virgin Islands and the Turks and Caicos Islands. The Norman Manley Law School in Jamaica has allocated citizens from Anguilla, Antigua and Barbuda, Belize, Jamaica, Montserrat, and St. Kitts and Nevis. The Hugh Wooding Law School in Trinidad and Tobago serves Barbados, Dominica, Grenada, Guyana, St. Lucia, St. Vincent and the Grenadines, and Trinidad and Tobago. The three schools were established by the Caribbean Council of Legal Education. Ironically, despite the Faculty of Law being founded in Barbados, that country does not have a law school, though one has been suggested.

The first law students, beginning studies in October 1970, consisted of 24 students in Jamaica, nineteen in Trinidad and Tobago, 35 in Barbados, and thirteen in Guyana. Two years later, almost 300 students were enrolled in the Faculty. The first graduates entered the profession in 1975.

The institutions control access to the Faculty of Law and Law Schools. However, costs can vary depending on whether the applicant's country has paid contributory grants to the Faculty or the School. Not all countries did. Therefore, applicants from non-contributing countries would be considered after those from contributing countries, and their fees would be higher.

=== Faculty of Sport ===
Launched in 2017, the UWI Faculty of Sport integrates teaching and research, professional development, community partnerships, and co- and extra-curricular student sport through three main units: Professional Programmes, Outreach & Projects Unit, Co-curricular & Intramural-Activity Unit and the Academic Programme & Activity Unit. The faculty is made up of four Academies of Sport: Cave Hill Academy of Sport, Open Campus Academy of Sport, Mona Academy of Sport and St Augustine Academy of Sport.

== UWI Press ==
Founded in 1992, the University of the West Indies Press is a department within the University of the West Indies system, located in Jamaica. Supported by a regionally assembled board of directors, UWI Press acts as the publishing arm of the main UWI campuses and their faculty and student body, including the Open Campus, where it additionally serves a network of 17 countries and territories. UWI Press focuses primarily on the traditional fields of Caribbean history, social sciences, political science, and cultural studies.

== Rankings ==
In the 2021 Times Higher Education World University Rankings, UWI ranked in the 401–500th band. and in 2023, ranked in the top 150 best universities in the world for best research impact. The 2021–2022 Times Higher Education ranking ranked UWI in the top 20 when compared with Latin American University rankings, and ranked UWI first in the Caribbean. In 2020, UWI ranked among the top 100 Golden Age University Rankings and Impact Rankings. UWI is the only Caribbean university to make these prestigious lists.

== People ==
=== Chancellors ===
- Princess Alice, Countess of Athlone, 1948–71
- Sir Hugh Wooding, 1971–74
- Sir Allen Montgomery Lewis 1974–89
- Sir Shridath Ramphal 1989–2003
- Sir George Alleyne 2003–2017
- Robert Bermudez 2017– 2024
- Dr. The Most Hon. Dodridge Miller 2024- Present

=== Vice-Chancellor ===
Principals

- Sir Thomas Taylor 1947–52
- Walter Wyatt Grave 1953–58
- Sir William Arthur Lewis 1958–60

Vice-Chancellors

- Sir William Arthur Lewis 1960–63
- Sir Philip Sherlock 1963–69
- Sir O Roy Marshall 1969–74
- Hon Aston Zachariah Preston 1974–86
- Pro-vice-chancellor L R B Robinson acting 1986–88
- Sir Alister McIntyre 1988–1998
- Rex Nettleford 1998–2004
- Eon Nigel Harris 2004–2015
- Sir Hilary Beckles 2015–

=== Notable faculty ===
- M. H. Ahmad: professor of biotechnology and director of the Biotechnology Centre at Mona campus between 1990 and 2011.
- Helen Asemota: professor of biochemistry and biotechnology
- Courtenay Bartholomew: the first lecturer and then Professor of Medicine at UWI St Augustine.
- V. C. R. A. C. Crabbe: Professor of Legislative Drafting, formerly justice of the Supreme Court of Ghana, and first Electoral Commissioner of Ghana.
- Leith Dunn Head of the Mona Unit
- Albert K Fiadjoe: Distinguished emeritus professor of public law.
- Elsa Goveia: first female professor of UCWI and noted pioneer in West Indian historiography.
- François Jackman: Ambassador to the UN and China, founded Chinese study institute at Barbados campus
- Bridget Jones (1935–2000): pioneering Literature and language professor from 1964 to 1982, who developed curricula to include Afro-, Anglo- and Franco-Caribbean writers in university syllabai at UWI and in Britain and Ireland.
- Dorothy King: head of the Microbiology Department of the medical faculty from 1973 to 2001.
- Elsa Leo-Rhynie: Principal of the Mona campus.
- William Arthur Lewis: economist, lecturer, author and joint winner of Nobel Memorial Prize in Economics of 1979.
- Albert Belville Lockhart: Consultant and Ophthalmologist, Recipient of the Jamaican Order of Merit, co-inventor of Canasol.
- Evelyn O'Callaghan: Professor of West Indian literature, dean of the Faculty of Humanities and Education.
- Orlando Patterson: John Cowles Professor of Sociology at Harvard University.
- George Maxwell Richards: Pro Vice Chancellor and Principal of the St. Augustine campus.
- Verene Sheperd (1951-): professor emerita, vice-president of the Reparations Committee of the Caricom
- Maureen Warner-Lewis: Professor Emerita of African-Caribbean Language and Orature; Gold Musgrave Medal winner in 2009.
- Manley Elisha West: Professor of Pharmacology, recipient of the Jamaican Order of Merit, co-inventor of Canasol.
- J. H. Parry :Gardiner Professor of Oceanic History and Affairs at Harvard University
- Raymond Gosling
- Richard D'Aeth: President of Hughes Hall, Cambridge University
- Michael B. Bracken
- Gordon Shirley pro vice chancellor and principal
- Mervyn C. Alleyne: Professor of Linguistics of the Mona and St. Augustine campi.
- Salikoko Mufwene: Lecturer of Linguistics of the Mona campus between 1980 and 1981.

=== Notable alumni ===
The university has produced students who have excelled in a number of disciplines, such as the arts and sciences, business, politics, and sports. Notable alumni and faculty include three Nobel Laureates, 72 Rhodes Scholars, three Gates Cambridge Scholarship winners, one Emmy award winner, one Man Booker Prize winner, one American Book Award winner, multiple Commonwealth Short Story Prize winners, 18 current or former Caribbean Heads of Government, Olympic gold medallists, among other award winners. The university's cricket team previously participated in West Indian domestic cricket, but now participates as part of a Combined Campuses and Colleges team.

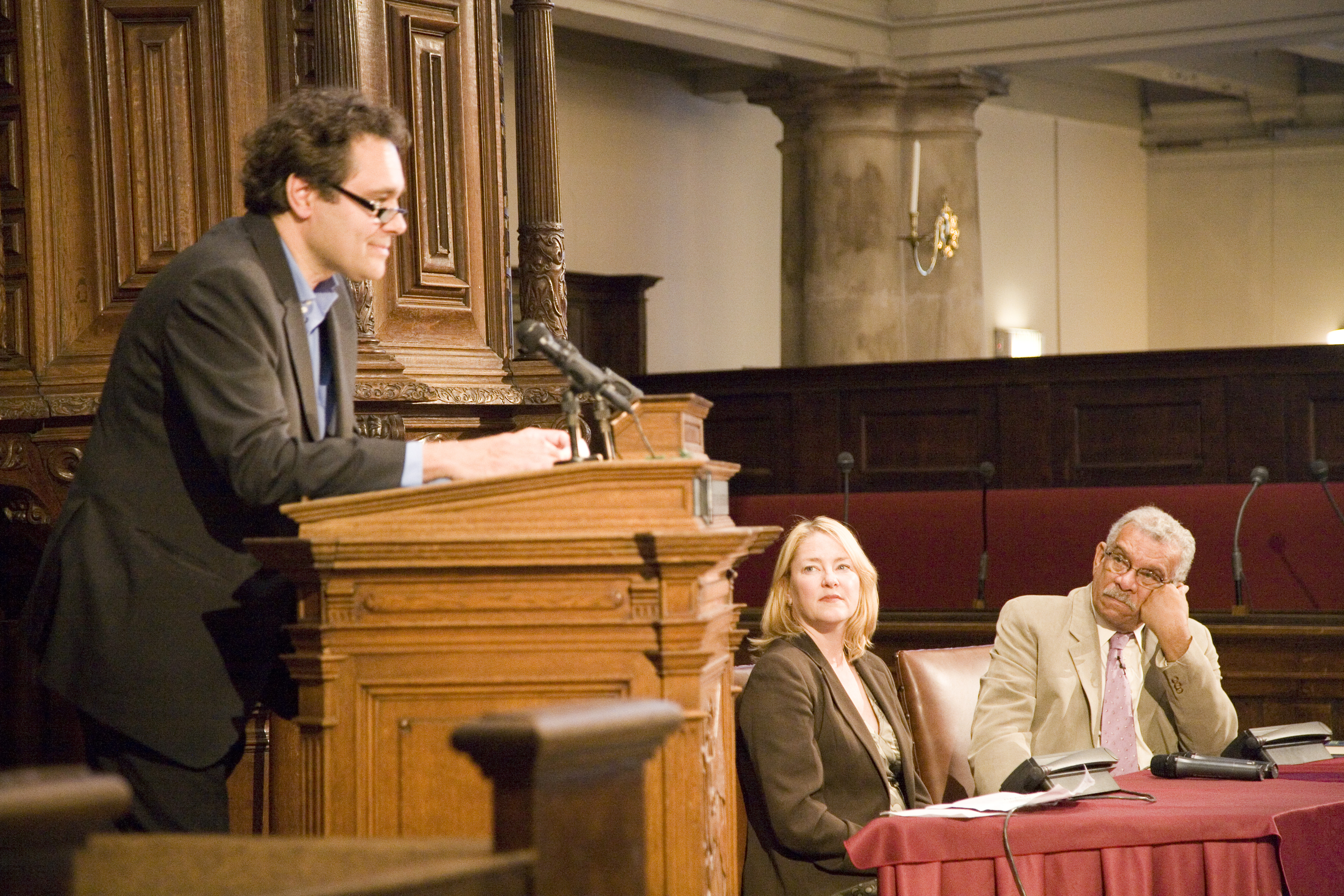
Sir Derek Walcott (right) studied at the University of the West Indies

UWI graduates who are, or have been, heads of government:

- Irfaan Ali, president of Guyana
- Vance Amory, former premier of Nevis
- Kenny Anthony, former prime minister of St. Lucia
- Owen Arthur, former prime minister of Barbados
- Dean Barrow, former prime minister of Belize
- Heather Doram, activist and educator who designed Antigua and Barbuda's national costume
- Denzil Douglas, former prime minister of St. Kitts & Nevis
- Rufus Ewing, premier of the Turks and Caicos Islands
- Bruce Golding, former prime minister of Jamaica
- Ralph Gonsalves, prime minister of St. Vincent and the Grenadines
- David A. Granger, president of Guyana
- Timothy Harris, prime minister of St. Kitts & Nevis
- Andrew Holness, prime minister of Jamaica
- Patrick Manning, former prime minister of Trinidad and Tobago
- Hubert Minnis, prime minister of The Bahamas
- Keith Mitchell, prime minister of Grenada
- Joseph Walcott Parry, former premier of Nevis
- P. J. Patterson, former prime minister of Jamaica
- Kamla Persad-Bissessar, first female prime minister of Trinidad and Tobago
- Philip J. Pierre, prime minister of Saint Lucia
- Keith Rowley, 7th prime minister of Trinidad and Tobago
- Lloyd Erskine Sandiford, former prime minister of Barbados
- Kennedy A. Simmonds, former prime minister of St. Kitts & Nevis
- Orlando Smith, chief minister of the British Virgin Islands
- Freundel Stuart, former prime minister of Barbados
- Tillman Thomas, former prime minister of Grenada
- David Thompson, former prime minister of Barbados

Graduates in other fields:

- Dame Anita Allen, president of the Court of Appeal of The Bahamas
- Faris Al-Rawi, former attorney general of Trinidad and Tobago
- Pamela Coke-Hamilton Director of International Trade for UNCTAD
- Merceline Dahl-Regis, Bahamian physician, former Chief Medical Officer of the Bahamas
- Edwidge Danticat, Haitian poet and writer
- Tracy Davidson-Celestine, former political leader of the Tobago Council of the People's National Movement and Trinidad and Tobago Ambassador to Costa Rica
- Kwame Dawes, Ghanaian poet and critic, and Professor of English at the University of Nebraska–Lincoln
- Erna Brodber, Jamaican writer, sociologist and social activist
- Kevin Fenton, President of the United Kingdom Faculty of Public Health
- Dennis Francis, Trinidad and Tobago diplomat, President of the United Nations General Assembly
- Donald J. Harris, emeritus professor of Stanford University
- Ishion Hutchinson, Award-winning poet and professor
- Renatha Francis, Justice of the Supreme Court of Florida
- Karen E. Nelson, Jamaican-American microbiologist
- Merle Collins, Grenadian poet
- Mercedes Richards, Jamaican astrophysics and astronomy professor
- Prince Harry, Duke of Sussex, Honorary Fellow
- Adam Stewart (business executive), Honorary Graduate
- Stephen Ames, Professional Golfer, Recipient of the Uwi Vice Chancellor's Award
- Kirani James, Olympic Gold Medallist
- Usain Bolt, Olympic Gold Medallist
- Alia Atkinson, Jamaican former competitive swimmer and Olympian
- Rita Marley, Jamaican reggae singer
- Marcia Griffiths, Jamaican reggae singer
- Beres Hammond, Jamaican reggae singer
- Alison Hinds, Bajan soca singer
- Fae Ellington, Jamaican media personality and lecturer
- Wendy Fitzwilliam, Miss Universe 1998
- Shelly-Ann Fraser-Pryce, Olympic Gold Medallist sprinter
- Marcia Gilbert-Roberts, Jamaican bureaucrat and diplomat who served as Jamaican Ambassador to several European countries including Germany, Spain and France
- Burton P. C. Hall, judge of the International Criminal Tribunal for the Former Yugoslavia and former Chief Justice of The Bahamas
- Lisa Hanna, Jamaican Miss World 1993
- Guy Harvey, Jamaican wildlife artist
- Marlon James, Jamaican-born winner of the 2015 Man Booker Prize
- Joshua Johnson, Trinidadian chess player
- Jerelle Joseph, academic and scientist
- Giselle Laronde, Trinidadian Miss World 1986
- Joan Latchman, director of the University of the West Indies Seismic Research Centre
- Ianthea Leigertwood-Octave, former judge of the Eastern Caribbean Supreme Court
- Charles W. Mills, Jamaican philosopher
- Dolliver Nelson, member of the International Tribunal for the Law of the Sea
- Hansle Parchment, Jamaican Olympic Gold Medallist
- Kris Rampersad, Trinidad and Tobago journalist, author and cultural advocate
- Shorna-Kay Richards, Jamaican diplomat
- Nafesha Richardson, women rights' advocate and climate activist from Saint Vincent and the Grenadines
- Patrick Lipton Robinson, Jamaican judge of the International Court of Justice
- Walter Rodney, Guyanese historian and political activist
- Richard Sealy, Barbadian Tourism Minister
- Olive Senior, Jamaican novelist and writer
- Joy Spence, Jamaican master blender
- Antoinette Tidjani Alou, Jamaican-Nigerien lecturer in Comparative Literature at Abdou Moumouni University
- Shafimana Ueitele, Namibian lawyer
- Lennox Honychurch, Dominican historian and Author
- M. NourbeSe Philip, Canadian poet
- Derek Walcott, Saint Lucian recipient of the 1992 Nobel Prize for Literature
- Francis Belle, Barbadian lawyer and judge

== See also ==
- Agence Universitaire de la Francophonie
- Association of Commonwealth Universities
- International Association of Universities
- University of the West Indies Museum
- University of Guyana
- University of Trinidad and Tobago
- University of Technology, Jamaica
- University of the Bahamas
- University of the French West Indies
- University of French Guiana
- Savacou, a sculpture on the Mona site
- University of the South Pacific, a similar university for Pacific Island states
- Historically black colleges and universities

== Notes ==
^α Serves the 16 campus funding countries.
