= Albert K. Fiadjoe =

Academic and Professor of Public Law

Albert Fiadjoe

Constitution Review Commission
- In office 2010–2012
- Appointed by: John Atta Mills

Personal details
- Born: Kumasi, Ghana

Albert K. Fiadjoe is a Ghanaian and Barbadian academic and an Emeritus Professor of Public Law.

== Early life and education ==
Fiadjoe was born in Kumasi in the Ashanti region of Ghana. He earned his LL.B (Hons.) from the University of Ghana, as well as an LL.M and a PhD from the University of London. He was a former dean of the faculty of law in Barbados and rose to become a professor (emeritus) of public law at the University of the West Indies.

== Career ==
=== Academia ===
Fiadjoe is an emeritus professor of public law and a former consultant with Fugar and Company. He is a legal consultant and academician in the areas of corporate law, comparative law, arbitration and alternative dispute resolution and public law. He was a visiting professor of law at Florida State University and Howard University, and a senior lecturer in the faculty of law, University of the West Indies. Fiadjoe is a former Council Member of the Ghana Academy of Arts and Sciences, of which he is a Fellow.

=== Constitution Review Commission ===
Fiadjoe was appointed by President Mills to chair a nine-member Constitution Review Commission of the Republic of Ghana 2010 to 2012. The commission was established to ascertain views on the operation of Ghana's 1992 Fourth Republican Constitution, and in particular its strengths and weaknesses. The commission received 83, 616 submissions gathered from regional and districts fora, mini consultations with relevant organizationsbas well as Africans in the Diaspora. The commission prepared a 960-page report and completed its work in 2012. The Government published a White Paper in response to the report and recommendations of the Commission

=== International organizations ===
Fiadjoe has consulted for the European Union (EU), the United Nations Development Programme (UNDP), the World Bank, the Organisation of American States (OAS), the Commonwealth Secretariat and the Inter-American Development Bank, among others.

Fiadjoe is a Member of the Ghana Bar Association, the London Court of International Arbitration (LCIA), a Barrister and Solicitor of the Supreme Court of Ghana, a Notary Public, Arbitrator and Restructuring and Insolvency Practitioner.

== See also ==
- Ghana Academy of Arts and Sciences
