= Yale School of Public Health =

Graduate school in New Haven, Connecticut, US

Coordinates: 41°18′11.2″N 72°55′53.3″W

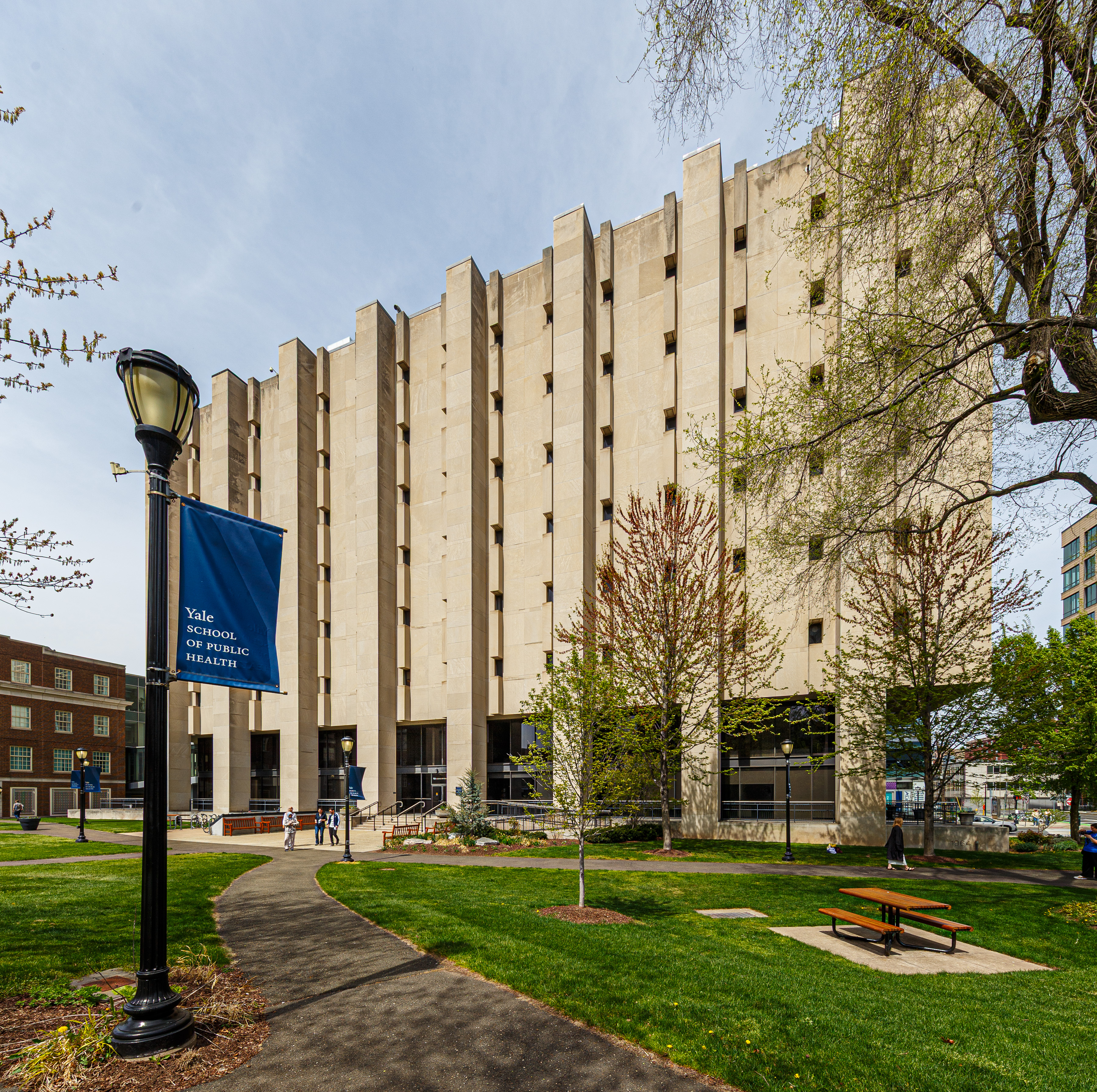
- Type: Private
- Established: 1915
- Affiliations: Yale University
- Endowment: ~ US$150 million (2024)
- Budget: US$103 million (FY 2023)
- Dean: Megan Ranney
- Students: 584 MPH, 142 MS, 115 PhD
- Location: New Haven, Connecticut, United States
- Website: ysph.yale.edu

The Yale School of Public Health (YSPH) is a fully independent professional school of public health within Yale University. It was founded in 1915 by Charles-Edward Amory Winslow and is one of the oldest academic public health programs in the United States.

== History ==
Founded in 1915, Yale's school of public health is one of the oldest of the nationally accredited schools of public health. It began when, in 1914, the university received an endowment from the Lauder Greenway Family to establish a chair in public health at the Yale Medical School. This chair was filled a year later by Charles-Edward Amory Winslow, who was and is still considered to be the “founder of public health” at Yale.

In its early years, Winslow's department of public health at Yale was a catalyst for public health reform in Connecticut, and the health surveys prepared by him and his faculty and students led to considerable improvements in public health organization. He also successfully campaigned to improve health laws in Connecticut, as well as for the passage of a bill that created the State Department of Public Health. Drawing on principles and expertise in existing departments at the School of Medicine to supplement public health courses, Winslow focused on educating undergraduate medical students in the context of preventive medicine. He established a one–year program leading to a Certificate in Public Health and a comprehensive non–medical program that graduated eighteen students with a Certificate in Public Health, ten with a Ph.D., and four with a Dr.P.H. by 1925. His students specialized in administration, bacteriology, or statistics. Due to three decades of Winslow's leadership and innovative foresight and commitment to interdisciplinary education, the department's academic programs earned recognition as a nationally accredited School of Public Health in 1946.

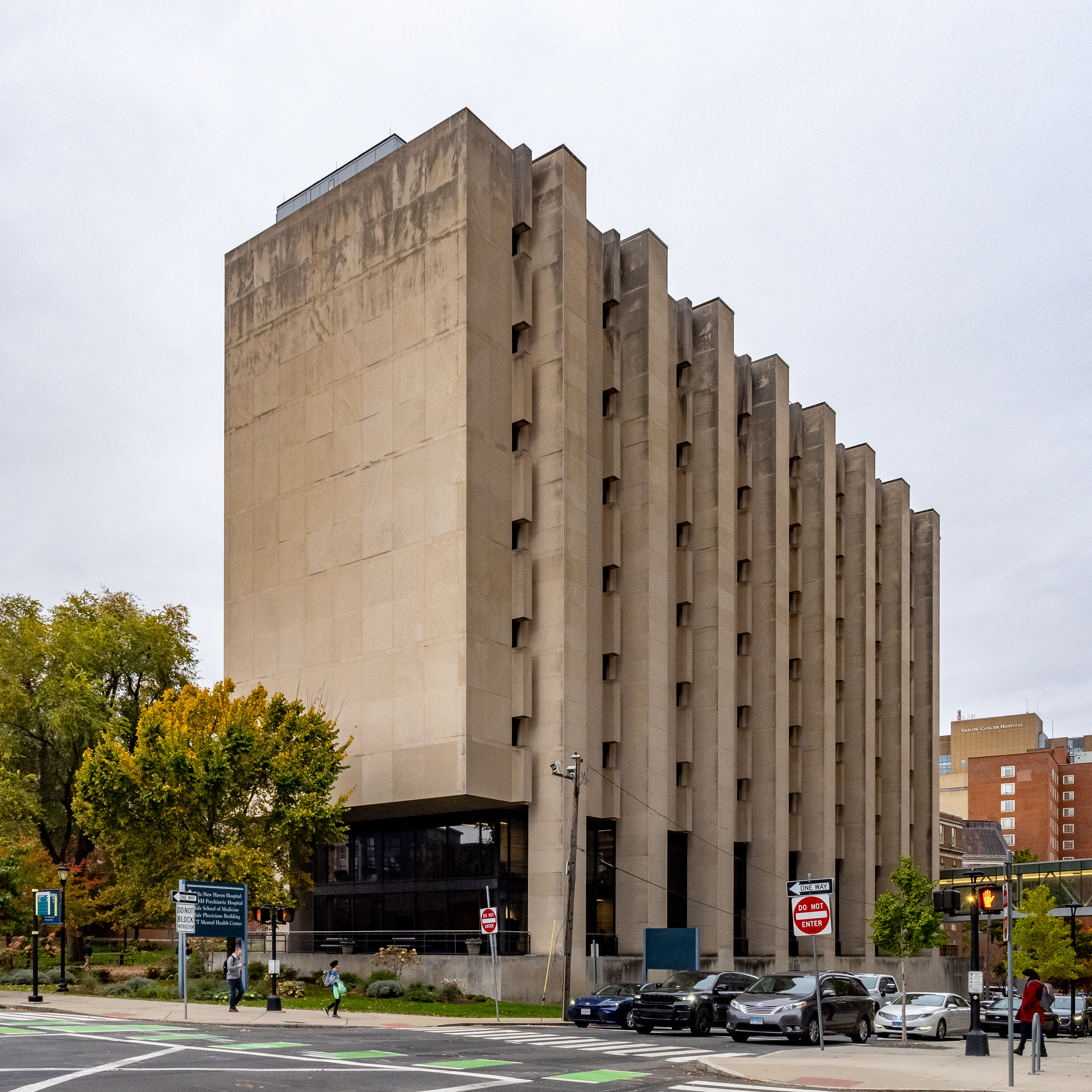
Southeast corner

In 1946, the Yale School of Public Health received its inaugural status as an accredited "school of public health." Because of this accreditation, Yale was, until 2024, in a unique situation of assuming the identities of both a department of the Yale School of Medicine and an autonomous school of public health. In the 1960s the Yale Department of Public Health merged with the section of epidemiology and preventive medicine, a unit within the department of internal medicine at the medical school, resulting in the department of epidemiology and public health (EPH). In 1964, EPH moved into its own building, the Laboratory of Epidemiology and Public Health (LEPH), which was designed by Philip Johnson and continues as the primary location for teaching and research. On July 1, 2024, with a pledge of $150 million in endowment funds from the University, YSPH transitioned to a fully independent, self-supporting professional school.

In 1964, the Arbovirus Research Unit of the Rockefeller Foundation moved to the Yale School of Public Health. It was at the Yale Arbovirus Research Unit (YARU) that Jordi Casals discovered and named the Lassa virus in 1969. He went on to describe and classify over a thousand viruses, and was considered an authority in viral taxonomy.

In July 2023, Megan Ranney began her term as dean of the Yale School of Public Health. She is an emergency medicine physician and the former Deputy Dean of the Brown University School of Public Health.

== Curricula ==
The Yale School of Public Health provides a public health education program with a low student to faculty ratio. YSPH awards Master of Public Health degrees as well as Master of Science and Ph.D. degrees through the Yale Graduate School. Programs of study include biostatistics, chronic disease epidemiology, environmental health sciences, epidemiology of microbial diseases, health care management, health policy, and social and behavioral sciences. YSPH also offers concentrations in global health, public health modeling, climate change and health, and US health and justice as well as tracks in maternal child health promotion and regulatory affairs, which are taken in conjunction with one of the core programs. The school also offers a one-year Advanced Professional MPH program for students who have already attained an advanced degree, an online Executive MPH program, a 22-month joint MPH and MBA with the Yale School of Management, and a five-year BA/MPH program for students of Yale College and Yale-NUS College. In addition, the School of Public Health offers joint degrees in divinity (M.Div./MPH and MAR/MPH), forestry and environmental studies (MF/MPH, MFS/MPH, MESC/MPH, and MEM/MPH), law (JD/MPH), management (MBA/MPH), nursing (MSN/MPH), international and development economics (MA/MPH), international affairs and cultural studies (MA/MPH with the MacMillan Center), and physician associate studies (MMSC/MPH).

YSPH students may take classes at the college and several of the University's graduate or professional schools if they find them relevant to their course of study. This includes the Yale Divinity School, Yale Law School, Yale Graduate School of Arts and Sciences, the Yale School of Forestry & Environmental Studies, Yale School of Nursing, Yale School of Drama, and Yale School of Management.

== Admissions ==
Admissions to the Yale School of Public Health is competitive and class sizes are the smallest among top-tier graduate public health programs around the country. The incoming MPH class of 2020 consisted of 206 students (29% male, 71% female, 17% diversity population, and 32% international), and represented 112 schools and 31 states. YSPH does not report average GPA or GRE scores of incoming students.

== Academics ==
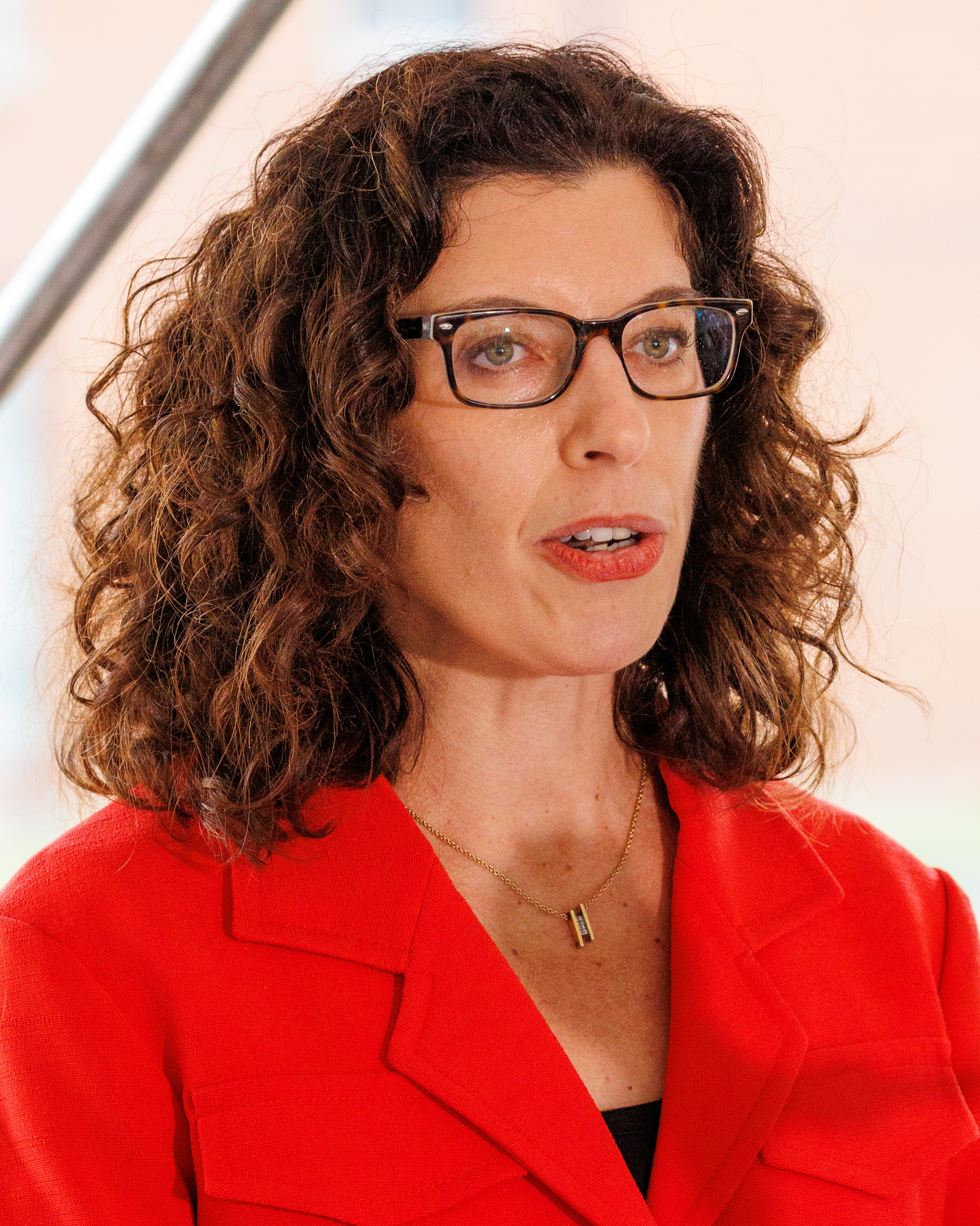
Dean Megan Ranney

The Yale School of Public Health offers a number of specialty certificates in addition to students' departmental studies in a number of interdisciplinary concentrations, tracks and programs. The MPH is offered in Biostatistics, Chronic Disease Epidemiology, Environmental Health Sciences, Epidemiology of Microbial Diseases, Health Care Management, Health Policy and Social and Behavioral Sciences. Concentrations are offered in: Global Health, Public Health Modeling, Climate Change and Health, US Health and Justice, Maternal Child Health Promotion, and the Regulatory Affairs Track.

All courses taken outside of YSPH must be graded (H, HP, P) in order to receive a course unit. Students are allowed to enroll in courses in other Yale schools if there is space available and if the instructor agrees. Courses taken at Yale College (undergraduate) must typically be at the 300-series level or above in order to receive a course unit toward the M.P.H. degree. Some 200-series courses at Yale College may count if approved by the student's faculty adviser.

The YSPH grading system is designed to foster an atmosphere of cooperative learning. Consequently, YSPH does not compute the grade point average (GPA) or class rank of its students. Students are graded only to provide them with a formal evaluation of their understanding of the concepts presented in their courses.

The Internship, seminars, and colloquia receive a grade of Satisfactory (S) upon successful completion. The grade of “Q” indicates courses for which a student has received a course exemption. 1. A grade of Honors should be assigned for performance that is distinguished. This reflects contributions that go beyond the requirements for the course, either in terms of the creativity of their application, the complexity of the settings in which the ideas are applied, or their ability to build on the methods and ideas taught in the class. Recognized grade equivalent: A+

2. A grade of High Pass should be assigned for students who have demonstrated a proficiency in the use of class material. Students earning this grade not only understand the material that was taught but can also deploy it in constructive ways for new problems. Recognized grade equivalent: A

3. A grade of Pass should be assigned for students who have demonstrated an understanding of the class material. They must be able to accurately describe ideas and methods and identify contexts in which they are appropriately used. Passing grades indicate that students are capable of performing competently in this domain as public health professionals. Recognized grade equivalent range: B-C

4. A grade of Fail should be assigned to students who cannot demonstrate an acceptable understanding of the core ideas, methods, or other class material and thus lack competence in this domain of public health.

== Notable alumni ==
- Andrea Álvarez Marín MPH '14, member of the Legislative Assembly of Costa Rica
- Dechen Wengmo, MPH '07, Minister of Health, Bhutan.
- Elizabeth Bradley, MBA, PhD '96, President of Vassar College.
- Gregg Gonsalves, PhD '17, HIV/AIDS activist and 2018 MacArthur Fellow.
- James Hamblin, MD, MPH '18, writer and senior editor, The Atlantic.
- Unni Karunakara, MPH '95, senior fellow, Yale Jackson Institute for Global Affairs, former International President for Médecins Sans Frontières/Doctors Without Borders.
- Irene Trowell-Harris, R.N., MPH '73, Ed.D., Maj Gen, USAF Ret.
- Michael B. Bracken, MPH '70, MPhil '72, PhD '74, past president of both the American College of Epidemiology and the Society for Epidemiologic Research; designed and performed the first randomized trials for evaluating therapies for acute spinal cord injuries.
- Cleve L. Killingsworth, MPH ’76, president and chief executive officer of Blue Cross Blue Shield Massachusetts. Killingsworth served as president and CEO of Health Alliance Plan in Detroit, president of Kaiser Permanente’s Central East Division, and senior vice president of insurance and care manager of Henry Ford Health System.
- Jean Martin Pinder, MPH '47, worked for USAID in Africa in the 1960s and 1970s

== Interdisciplinary Research, Special Programs, and Affiliated Centers ==
- Yale Institute for Global Health
- Yale Center on Climate Change and Health
- Yale Center for Perinatal, Pediatric, and Environmental Epidemiology
- Emerging Infections Program
- Yale Griffin Prevention Research Center
- Yale Cancer Center
- Center for Interdisciplinary Research on AIDS
- Center for Nicotine & Tobacco Use Research at Yale
- Transdisciplinary Tobacco Use Research Century
- Collaborative Center for Statistics in Science (C^{2}S^{2})
- The John B. Pierce Laboratory
- The Yale Program on Aging
- Yale University Center for Genomics & Proteomics
- Yale Center for Analytical Sciences
- Center for Methods in Implementation and Prevention Science
- Community Alliance for Research and Engagement
- Humanities, Arts and Public Health Practice at Yale (HAPPY)
- InnovateHealth Yale
