= Michael B. Bracken =

Perinatal epidemiologist

- Born: September 24, 1942 (age 83); Bradford, Yorkshire, England
- Education: University of London; Yale University
- Occupations: professor, perinatal epidemiologist

Michael B. Bracken (born September 24, 1942) is an American perinatal epidemiologist. He is the Susan Dwight Bliss Professor of Epidemiology at the Yale School of Public Health, and Professor of Obstetrics, Gynecology and Reproductive Sciences, and Professor of Neurology at the Yale School of Medicine. He is co-director of the Yale Center for Perinatal, Pediatric and Environmental Epidemiology.

Bracken has authored some 400 articles, correspondence and book chapters, and 3 books concentrating on the perinatal discipline, obstetrics and gynecology, neonatology, neurology, and evidence-based medicine. His publications focus on various topics from smoking, alcohol, nutrition, and caffeine to preterm and low birth weight newborns, electromagnetic fields, birth defects, and asthma. He is the former head of chronic disease epidemiology and former vice chairman (deputy dean) of the Yale School of Public Health where he has studied, taught, and conducted research since 1968.

== Early life and education ==
Bracken was born on September 24, 1942, in Bradford, Yorkshire, England. He attended the University of Bristol, St. Paul’s College in Cheltenham, England, from 1962 to 1965. Upon graduation in 1965, he received his teaching certificate from the Ministry of Education. He earned his Bachelor's of Science with Special Honors in zoology from the University of London in 1968. The same year, he enrolled in the public health program at Yale University and in 1970 earned his Master of Public Health degree. He continued his studies at Yale University, and in 1971 completed his Master's in Philosophy and in 1974 earned his Ph.D. in epidemiology.

== Academia ==
=== Career ===
Bracken’s early teaching career began in 1965 with a position in the Kumasi Academy in Kumasi, Ghana, sponsored by the British Voluntary Service Overseas. After returning to England in 1966, he obtained a teaching position through the London Education Authority for a two-year term.

He enrolled in the public health program at Yale University in 1968 and while still completing his studies, in 1971 he joined the faculty as a research associate in the Department of Obstetrics and Gynecology at Yale University School of Medicine. From 1973 to 1980, Bracken was appointed research associate and lecturer in epidemiology and public health in the then Department of Epidemiology and Public Health at Yale School of Medicine. In 1977, he became the director of the National Acute Spinal Cord Injury Study, and continued in that role until 2001. In 1969, he joined the Faculty of Medicine at the University of the West Indies in Kingston, Jamaica, as a visiting lecturer in social medicine and epidemiology. During his time in Jamaica, he conducted research in family planning.

In 1979, Bracken established and directed the Yale Perinatal Epidemiology Unit. In 1980, he became senior research associate and lecturer in two departments at the Yale medical school - Epidemiology, and Obstetrics and Gynecology. He was appointed associate professor in 1983 and full tenured professor in 1986, with teaching responsibilities in both fields of medicine. In 1991, he was appointed professor jointly in the Department of Epidemiology and Public Health and the Graduate School at Yale University. His academic career continued to expand in 1991 to include administrative roles when he became vice chairman (deputy dean of public health) of the Department of Epidemiology and Public Health. He became head of the Division of Chronic Disease Epidemiology in 1995. In recognition of his interdisciplinary research activities in spinal cord injury, he became professor in the Department of Neurology in 1997 at the Yale School of Medicine. From 2001, he was appointed fellow of one of Yale’s residential colleges, Branford College.

Bracken was named Susan Dwight Bliss Professor of Epidemiology at Yale in 2001. In 2002, the Yale Perinatal Epidemiology Unit became the Yale Center for Perinatal, Pediatric and Environmental Epidemiology. The change of title reflected the incorporation of research projects focusing on environmental health as well as collaboration with faculty from other epidemiologic disciplines. Since 2002, Bracken has shared co-directorship of the center with Brian P. Leaderer, professor of epidemiology in the environmental health sciences and deputy dean at the Yale School of Public Health.

From 2005 to 2008 Bracken was research fellow of Green College at the University of Oxford, and in 2008, he was appointed research fellow of renamed Green Templeton College at the University of Oxford. In 2013, he was director of graduate studies at the Yale School of Public Health. Bracken has taught courses in perinatal epidemiology, pharmaco-epidemiology, and evidence-based medicine and health care at Yale University.

=== Research interests ===
Primarily from the National Institutes of Health, Bracken has received over 20 grant and contract awards totaling some $60 million. Among his funded projects, he has studied electromagnetic fields, acid aerosols and respiration, caffeine and coffee, asthma severity and medication, and paraxanthine in relation to pregnancy, newborns and infants. His more recent projects have involved air quality and children with asthma and susceptibility genes for childhood asthma.

=== Consulting ===
Bracken has consulted for the World Health Organization, international corporations and agencies on various health related issues, evidence-based medicine, and epidemiology. He has served on a number of study sections and committees for the National Institutes of Health including the Council of the National Institute of Deafness and Communicative Disorders, Epidemiology and Disease Control Study Section, and the Expert Panel on Genes and Environment. He has also participated in advising the Institute of Medicine on special panels.

== Books ==
His first book titled Perinatal Epidemiology, published in 1984 by Oxford University Press, was one of the earliest compilations of in-depth investigations and research methods in the modern field of perinatology. Bracken co-edited his second book titled Effective Care of the Newborn Infant with John C. Sinclair published in 1992 by Oxford University Press. The book focuses on interventions in neonatal care and the use of statistical methods, systematic research, and clinical trials for informing health care providers. The book served as a key cornerstone in the foundation of the international Cochrane Collaboration and was named as one of the most influential books in evidence-based medicine by The British Medical Journal.

His most recent book Risk, Chance, and Causation: Investigating the Origins and Treatment of Disease was published by Yale University Press in the summer of 2013 and received honorable mention by the American Publishers Award for Professional and Scholarly Excellence PROSE and the CHOICE Outstanding Academic Title in the Health Sciences Category in 2013. Written for a broad audience, the book provides an overview of the field of epidemiology and evidence-based medicine.

- Bracken MB. Perinatal epidemiology. New York: Oxford University Press; 1984. ISBN 978-0195033892.
- Sinclair JC, Bracken MB. Effective care of the newborn infant. Oxford; New York: Oxford University Press; 1992. ISBN 978-0192617378.
- Bracken MB. Risk, chance, and causation: investigating the origins and treatment of disease. New Haven: Yale University Press; 2013. ISBN 978-0300188844.

== Awards and honours ==
- Rockefeller Scholar at Bellagio, 1989
- National Rehabilitation Week Research Award, 1990
- Wakeman Award for Neuroscience Research, 1990
- National Spinal Cord Injury Association, L.W. Freeman Award, 1992
- The Society of Authors (London) Glaxo Prize for Medical Writing, finalist, 1992
- Elected Connecticut Academy of Science and Engineering, 1993
- Elected Governing Council of Connecticut Academy of Science and Engineering, 1995
- President, American College of Epidemiology, 1996-97
- Royal College of Physicians and Surgeons of Canada, Royal College Lecturer, 1997
- American College of Epidemiology, American Public Health Association, Canadian Society for Epidemiology and Biostatistics, Society for Epidemiologic Research Combined Special Award "for vision, outstanding leadership and dedication as convener of the 2001 Congress of Epidemiology," 2001
- Susan Dwight Bliss Professor, Yale University, 2001
- Elected Research Fellow, Green College, Oxford University, 2005
- President, Society for Epidemiologic Research, 2006-2007
- Roy M. Pitkin Award from the American College of Obstetricians and Gynecologists for best paper in Obstetrics and Gynecology, 2009
- American College of Epidemiology Abraham Lilienfeld Award "For excellence in the field of epidemiology. The highest honor the College bestows," 2013
- The American Publishers Award for Professional and Scholarly Excellence PROSE, Honorable Mention, 2013
- D.Sc honoris causa, University Gloucestershire, UK, 2015
- Gordon Lecture Award, National Institutes of Health, 2016
