= Jean Martin Pinder =

American nurse

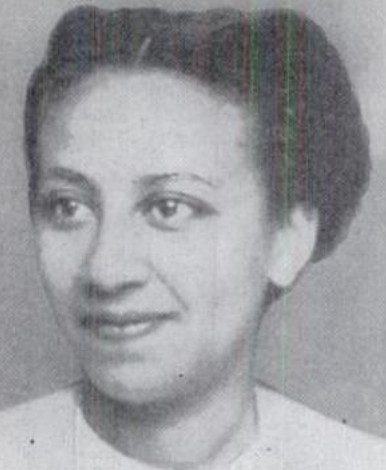
- Jean Martin Pinder, from a 1947 magazine
- Born: Jean Margaret Martin; September 2, 1916; Oakland, California
- Died: September 7, 2014 (aged 98)
- Occupation(s): Nurse, public health professional

Jean Margaret Martin Pinder (September 2, 1916 – September 7, 2014) was an American nurse and public health official who worked for the United States Agency for International Development (USAID) in Africa in the 1960s and 1970s.

== Early life and education ==
Jean Margaret Martin was born in Oakland, California, the daughter of George Martin and Mercedes Simms Martin. She attended San Francisco State University, and graduated from the University of California, Berkeley in 1940, with a bachelor's degree in nursing and as a registered nurse. In 1947, she became one of the first Black women to graduate from the Yale School of Public Health.

== Career ==
Martin taught nursing courses at Dillard University before she joined the United States Public Health Service in 1953. She was appointed Health Education Advisor to the Government of Liberia. She held a similar position in Ghana in 1957, and also worked as a health policy advisor in Sierra Leone. She worked for the United States Agency for International Development (USAID) in Africa and Washington, D.C., mostly on family planning policies, nutrition, and maternal and child health. In 1968, the United States ambassador to Ghana, Franklin Williams, praised her and her husband as "unusually efficient ambassadors for America to millions of Africans and others." While she was based in Washington, she was membership chair of the Women's Action Organization (WAO), a group for women employees of the United States Department of State.

Pinder retired from public health work in 1982. In retirement, she lived in Tucson, Arizona, where she started a free clinic in a Yaqui community, and played violin in the Community Orchestra of Tucson.

== Personal life and legacy ==
Jean Martin married Frank Pinder, an agricultural economist who also worked in Africa. Frank Pinder died in 1992. She lived with her friend Elouise Duncan in Tucson in retirement, then with Elouise's son and his family in Gaithersburg, Maryland. She died in 2014, aged 98 years. The Oakland Public Library has a small collection of her papers. The University of Washington created the Jean M. Pinder Endowment to support advanced education in healthcare fields among minority students.
