= Sheila Dorothy King =

Barbadian-Jamaican microbiologist

- Born: 1932 (age 93–94); Barbados
- Other names: Dorothy King, Dorothy King Wynter, Sheila Dorothy King-Wynter
- Occupations: physician, academic
- Years active: 1959–2001
- Known for: First woman to become a full professor in the Medical Faculty at the University of the West Indies

Sheila Dorothy King, CD (born 1932) was a Barbadian-born, Jamaican academic and physician. She was the second woman to be appointed as full professor at the University of the West Indies (UWI). She was the first woman appointed as a professor in the Faculty of Medicine in 1983, ten years after she was appointed as head of UWI's Microbiology Department. A specialist in infectious disease and viral epidemiology, she advised numerous national, regional and international departments and governmental agencies on such diseases as dengue, influenza, and typhoid. In 1998, she was honored as a Commander of the Order of Distinction.

== Early life ==
Sheila Dorothy King, known as Dorothy, was born in 1932, in Barbados to Henrietta Adina (née Stuart) and Alfred T. King. She grew up in Barbados and completed her secondary education at Queen's College in Bridgetown, before enrolling in medical school at the University College of the West Indies in Mona, Jamaica. In 1958, King graduated with a Bachelor of Medicine, Bachelor of Surgery and on the day of her graduation became engaged to fellow medical student, Hugh Hastings Wynter. The two were assigned to complete their internship at the University College Hospital in the obstetrics and gynecology department. On 28 December 1959, at the chapel on the UWI campus, King and Wynter married.

== Career ==
Over the next four years, King worked in various rotations including as Casualty Officer, House Officer in Medicine, House Officer of Obstetrics and Gynaecology, and Senior House Officer in Paediatrics at the University College Hospital. During this time, she also had two sons, Shaun and David. In 1961, she was appointed as an assistant Lecturer in the Department of Microbiology at UWI. That same year, leaving her children in Jamaica with their grandparents, King relocated to England and enrolled in post-graduate studies at the University of London. She graduated with her Postgraduate Diploma in Bacteriology in 1964 and went on to earn her Membership in the Royal College of Pathology at the University of London, before returning home to resume her post at UWI.

Besides her teaching, King conducted research on viral diseases. In 1968, she was involved in a vaccine study to inoculate Jamaican school children at risk for the rubella virus with a weakened strain of live virus. In 1970, King was granted tenure and three years later she was made Head of the Department of Microbiology. Simultaneously, in 1973, she began working as the supervisor for the Ministry of Health's Typhoid Carrier Surveillance Programme. The following year, she was appointed to the advisory board of the Trinidad Virus Laboratory and became an advisor to the Pan American Health Organization (PAHO)'s Committee on Dengue in the Americas. In 1977, a dengue epidemic swept through Jamaica, soon spreading throughout the Caribbean and to the American mainland. King and Dr. Esmie Rose, who headed the Virology Department directed the investigation to identify the virus and develop a plan to control the virus. Their findings were presented at a conference held in Montego Bay 8–11 May 1978.

King also made studies of the rotavirus and the role they played in the development of gastroenteritis, typhoid, meningitis, and Hepatitis B and was a prolific publisher and presenter at international conferences on regional infectious disease. From 1981, had additional responsibilities as Director of the Jamaican Influenza Center for the WHO and on the advisory board for the Caribbean Epidemiological Center (CAREC). In 1983, after a decade heading the Department of Microbiology, and earning her Doctor of Medicine degree from the University of London, King was made a full professor. The appointment was only the second full professorship ever granted to a woman in UWI's history and was the first time a woman had been elevated to the position in the faculty of medicine. To recognize her achievement, King was awarded the Medal of Appreciation by the Prime Minister that same year. In 1998, she was honored by the government of Jamaica as a Commander in the Order of Distinction and that same year conducted research into a virulent strain of the influenza virus which was prevalent on the island. King retired from UWI in 2001.

== Selected works ==
- Grant, L.; Belle, E. A.; Provan, G.; King, S. D.; Sigel, M. M. (September 1970). "Trials with a live attenuated rubella virus vaccine, Cendehill strain". The Journal of Hygiene. 68 (3). Cambridge, England: Cambridge University Press: 505–510. doi:10.1017/s0022172400042418. ISSN 0022-1724. JSTOR 3861682. PMC 2130824. PMID 5272349.
- French, G. L.; King, S. D.; St Louis, P. (August 1977). "Salmonella Serotypes, Salmonella typhi Phage Types, and Anti-Microbial Resistance at the University Hospital of the West Indies, Jamaica". The Journal of Hygiene. 79 (1). Cambridge, England: Cambridge University Press: 5–16. doi:10.1017/s0022172400052797. ISSN 0022-1724. JSTOR 3862423. PMC 2129917. PMID 267669.
- King, S. D.; Rose, E.; Bancroft, W. H.; McCown, J. M.; Woodall, J.; Sather, G. (1979). "The laboratory diagnosis of dengue in Jamaica, 1977". Scientific Publication 375. Dengue in the Caribbean, 1977. Proceedings of a Workshop Held in Montego Bay, Jamaica (May 8–11, 1978). Washington, D.C.: Pan American Health Organization. pp. 153–158.
- Belle, Edward A.; King, S. Dorothy; Griffiths, Bertie B.; Grant, Louis S. (July 1980). "Epidemiological Investigation for Arboviruses in Jamaica, West Indies". The American Journal of Tropical Medicine and Hygiene. 29 (4). Deerfield, Illinois: The American Society of Tropical Medicine and Hygiene: 667–675. doi:10.4269/ajtmh.1980.29.667. ISSN 0002-9637. PMID 7406115.
- Palmer, C. J.; King, S. D.; Cuadrado, R. R.; Perez, E.; Baum, M.; Ager, A. L. (May 1999). "Evaluation of the MRL diagnostics dengue fever virus IgM capture ELISA and the PanBio Rapid Immunochromatographic Test for diagnosis of dengue fever in Jamaica". Journal of Clinical Microbiology. 37 (5). Washington, D.C.: American Society for Microbiology: 1600–1601. doi:10.1128/JCM.37.5.1600-1601.1999. ISSN 0095-1137. PMC 84845. PMID 10203534.
