= Shuhan He =

American doctor, researcher, and founder

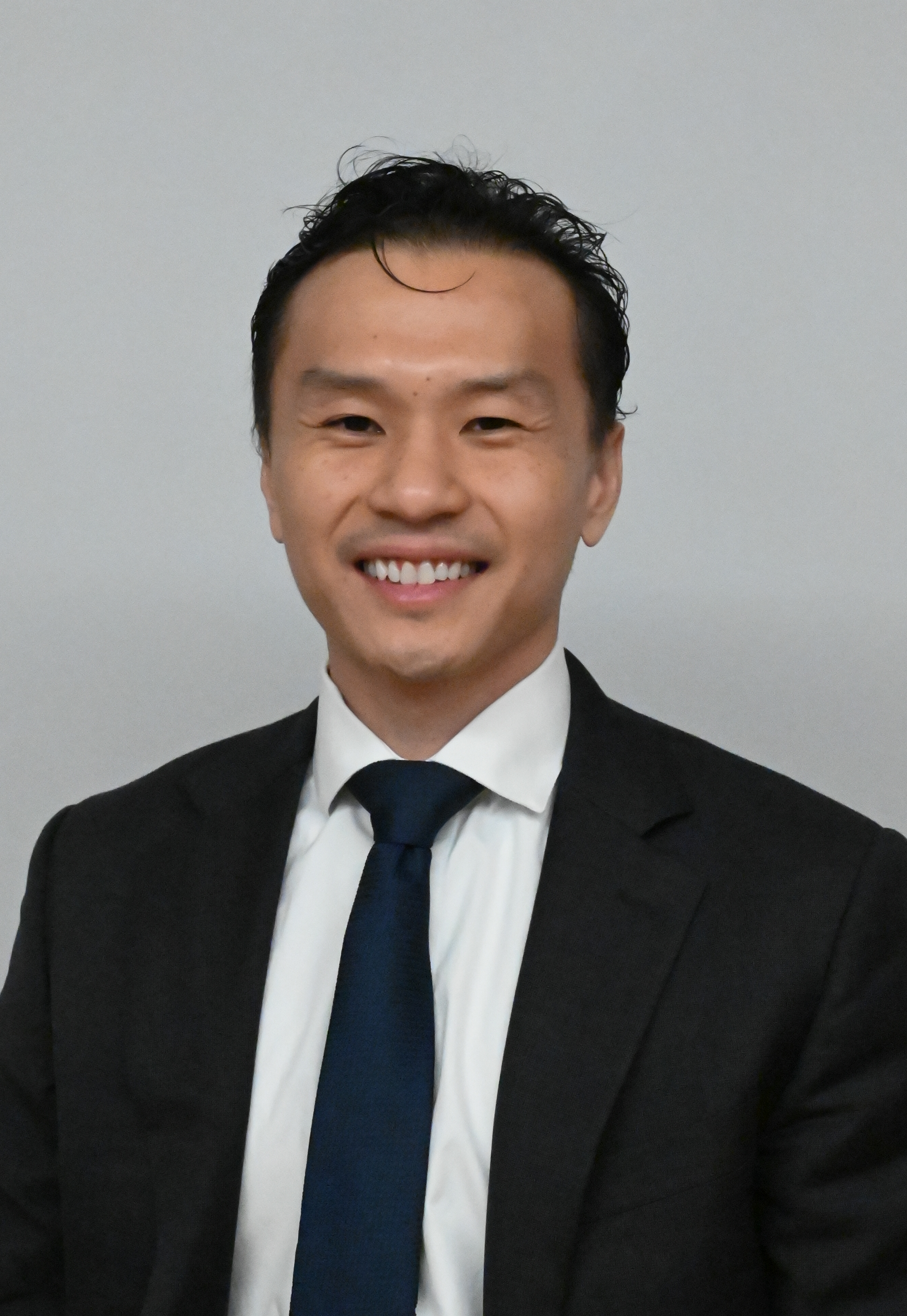
- Education: USC Keck School of Medicine (MD)
- Occupations: Doctor, researcher, founder
- Employer(s): Massachusetts General Hospital MGH Institute of Health Professions Harvard Medical School

Shuhan He is an American doctor, researcher, and founder. He works in both the Department of Emergency Medicine and the Lab of Computer Science at Massachusetts General Hospital, the program director of Healthcare Data Analytics at the MGH Institute of Health Professions, and teaches emergency medicine at Harvard Medical School. He has also founded several different organizations, including ConductScience.org and Get Us PPF, as well as pioneered an effort to involve emojis in the healthcare industry.

In 2021, He was considered an emerging leader in healthcare by Modern Healthcare. In 2026, He was named an Innovator in Healthcare honoree by Boston Business Journal for founding ConductScience.

== Education ==
He received his MD from the USC Keck School of Medicine and completed his residency at Brigham and Women's Hospital.

He is also twice-certified: in Clinical Informatics by the American Board of Preventive Medicine and in Emergency Medicine by the American Board of Emergency Medicine.

== Career ==
=== ConductScience ===
In 2015, He founded ConductScience.org, a platform for academic publishing.

=== COVID-19 ===
In 2020, He founded Get Us PPF, an organization delivering personal protective equipment. By the following year, it provided over 10 million pieces and gathered several other organizations to push a nationwide campaign called #GETUSPPE. He also advised Covid Act Now, a not-for-profit providing real-time information on COVID-19. For his work on the two, he was named an emerging leader by Modern Healthcare.

=== Emoji ===
In 2020, He helped create two emojis: the anatomical heart and the lung. The following year, He co-published an article in JAMA with Jennifer 8. Lee and Debbie Lai titled, "Emoji for the Medical Community—Challenges and Opportunities," investigating the possibility of using emoji in medical practice to improve communication between physicians and patients. The paper ignited a broader conversation in the community, prompting think-pieces from outlets like Fast Company, The Verge, and others.

In 2023, He collaborated with Kendrick A. Davis, a professor of psychiatry and neuroscience at University of California, Riverside, on using emojis in a healthcare setting and developing "a universal emoji-based language system in healthcare communication." He has also been credited with further efforts in bringing other medically relevant emojis to life.
