= Philip Kantoff =

Medical researcher

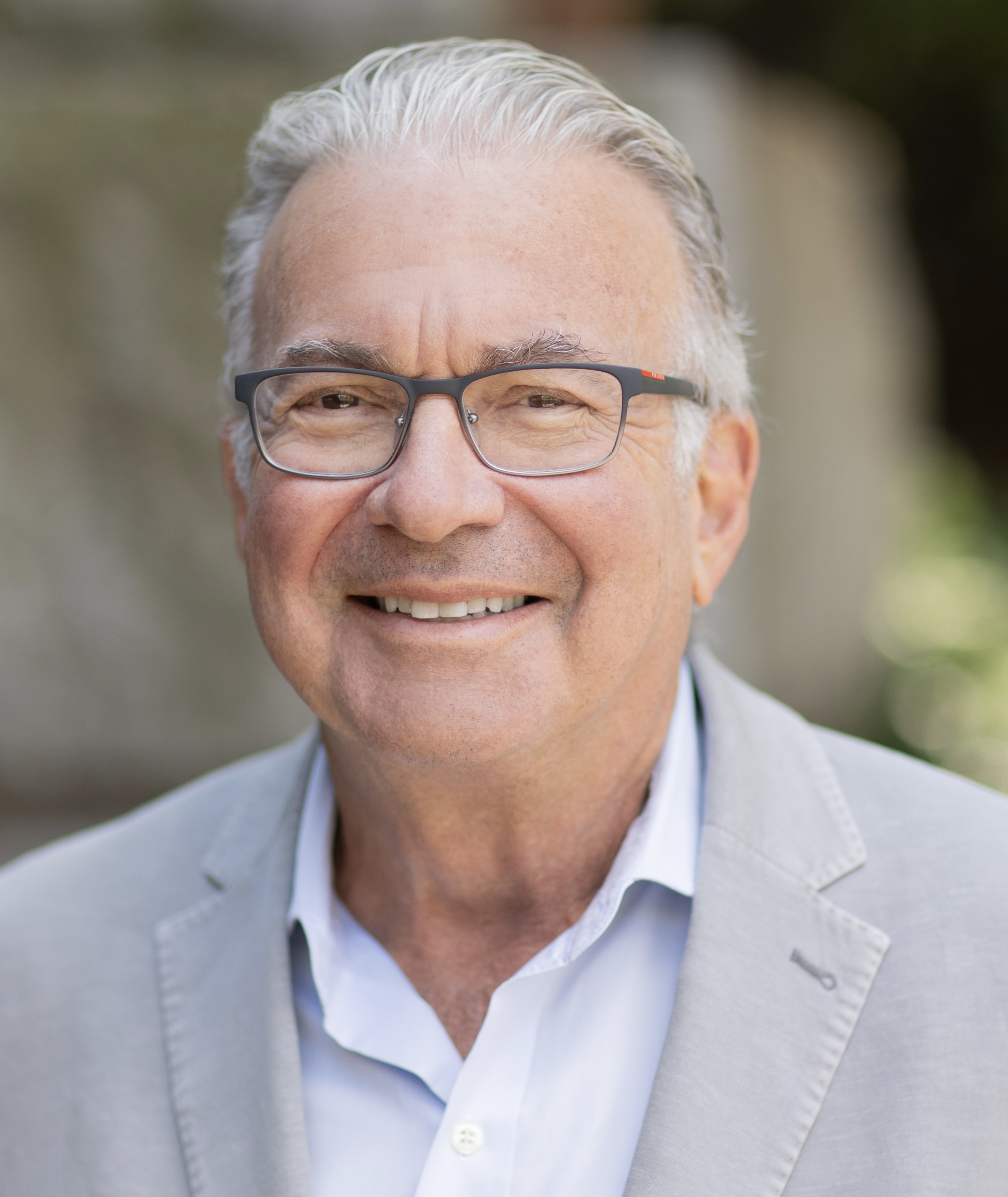
- Citizenship: American
- Education: Forest Hills High School; College of Brown University; Alpert Medical School
- Scientific career
- Workplaces: Harvard Medical School; Memorial Sloan Kettering Cancer Center; Weill Cornell Medical College
- Website: Philip Kantoff

Philip W. Kantoff is a medical oncologist. He is the chairman and chief executive officer (CEO) of Convergent Therapeutics. He served as the Chairman of Medicine at Memorial Sloan Kettering Cancer Center between 2015 and 2021. He is best known for his contributions to the impact of DNA abnormalities in prostate cancer and the discovery of therapies for metastatic hormone-sensitive prostate cancer.

== Education ==
Kantoff grew up in Forest Hills, New York City. He attended Brown University, where he earned his undergraduate and medical degrees through the Program in Liberal Medical Education. He completed his residency in internal medicine at New York University/Bellevue Hospital, followed by a post doctorate at the National Institutes of Health. He then completed his fellowship in medical oncology at the Dana–Farber Cancer Institute.

== Career ==
Kantoff joined the Dana–Farber Cancer Institute in a full-time position in genitourinary oncology in 1988. He held various roles at Dana-Farber, including director of the Lank Center for Genitourinary Oncology, chief of the Division of Solid Tumor Oncology, and head of the Prostate Cancer Program. He was named the inaugural Nancy and Jerome Kohlberg Professor at Harvard Medical School in 2014.

While at Dana-Farber, he also served as the lead investigator for Dendreon's clinical trials for Sipuleucel-T, a therapeutic vaccine for prostate cancer approved in 2010. After 28 years at Dana-Farber, Kantoff joined Memorial Sloan Kettering Cancer Center in 2015 to replace George J. Bosl as the Chairman of Medicine. He serves as a Professor of Medicine at the Weill Cornell Medical College. Kantoff won two 2018 Prostate Cancer Foundation Challenge Awards, one on Clonal Hematopoiesis and Prostate Cancer and another alongside fellow principal investigator Mark Pomerantz on DNA Damage Repair Alterations in Prostate Cancer. He was also awarded an NCI SPORE grant for prostate cancer from 2001 to 2015 and a NCI Program Project Grant in 2019 on DNA Damage Repair Alterations in Prostate Cancer. In 2018, Kantoff became an independent director at Context Therapeutics.

In 2021, Kantoff was appointed chairman and chief executive officer of Convergent Therapeutics, a pharmaceutical company based in Cambridge, Massachusetts that focuses on radiopharmaceutical cancer therapies. In 2022, Kantoff joined the board of directors of ESSA Pharma.

== Significant publications ==
- Komura K, Yoshikawa Y, Shimamura T, Chakraborty G, Gerke TA, Hinohara K, Chadalavada K, Jeong SH, Armenia J, Du SY, Mazzu YZ, Taniguchi K, Ibuki N, Meyer CA, Nanjangud GJ, Inamoto T, Lee GM, Mucci LA, Azuma H, Sweeney CJ, Kantoff PW (July 2018). "ATR inhibition controls aggressive prostate tumors deficient in Y-linked histone demethylase KDM5D". The Journal of Clinical Investigation. 128 (7): 2979–2995. doi:10.1172/JCI96769. PMC 6025984. PMID 29863497.
- Kantoff PW, Higano CS, Shore ND, Berger ER, Small EJ, Penson DF, Redfern CH, Ferrari AC, Dreicer R, Sims RB, Xu Y, Frohlich MW, Schellhammer PF (July 2010). "Sipuleucel-T immunotherapy for castration-resistant prostate cancer". The New England Journal of Medicine. 363 (5): 411–22. doi:10.1056/NEJMoa1001294. PMID 20818862.
- Kantoff PW, Kohn DB, Mitsuya H, Armentano D, Sieberg M, Zwiebel JA, Eglitis MA, McLachlin JR, Wiginton DA, Hutton JJ (September 1986). "Correction of adenosine deaminase deficiency in cultured human T and B cells by retrovirus-mediated gene transfer". Proceedings of the National Academy of Sciences of the United States of America. 83 (17): 6563–7. Bibcode:1986PNAS...83.6563K. doi:10.1073/pnas.83.17.6563. PMC 386544. PMID 3489233.
- Giovannucci E, Stampfer MJ, Krithivas K, Brown M, Dahl D, Brufsky A, Talcott J, Hennekens CH, Kantoff PW (April 1997). "The CAG repeat within the androgen receptor gene and its relationship to prostate cancer". Proceedings of the National Academy of Sciences of the United States of America. 94 (7): 3320–3. Bibcode:1997PNAS...94.3320G. doi:10.1073/pnas.94.7.3320. PMC 20367. PMID 9096391.
- Chakraborty G, Armenia J, Mazzu YZ, Stopsack KH, Atiq MO, Chadalavada K, Nanjangud G, Khan N, Komura K, Yoshikawa Y, Du SY, Lee GS, Kantoff PW (2018). "BRCA2-RB1 co-loss and ADT resistance in aggressive prostate cancer". Journal of Clinical Oncology. 36 (15_suppl) e17024. doi:10.1200/JCO.2018.36.15_suppl.e17024.

== Awards ==
- Inaugural Nancy and Jerome Kohlberg Chair in Medicine, Harvard Medical School
- Giants in Cancer Care
- Elected member, Association of American Physicians, 2018
