= Srihari S. Naidu =

Srihari S. Naidu is an American physician and Professor of Medicine at New York Medical College who is known for his work on hypertrophic cardiomyopathy including the procedure known as alcohol septal ablation, and for helping to construct the universal diagnostic criteria for cardiogenic shock.

== Career ==
An academic interventional cardiologist, Naidu is an expert in the management of patients with hypertrophic cardiomyopathy, including the minimally-invasive alternative to surgery known as alcohol septal ablation. A co-author on the 2011 and 2024 ACCF/AHA National Guideline on the Diagnosis and Management of Hypertrophic Cardiomyopathy, he is editor of the international textbook on the disease, runs a Hypertrophic Cardiomyopathy Treatment Center following over 2500 patients, and has performed over 300 alcohol septal ablations, believed to be the largest case series by a single-operator within the United States. Hypertrophic cardiomyopathy is the most common cause of sudden cardiac death among athletes, and a cause of heart failure at all ages.

Naidu is Director of the Cardiac Cath Lab and Hypertrophic Cardiomyopathy Center - with offices in Long Island and Westchester - at Westchester Medical Center in Valhalla, NY. He is a two-term Past Member of the American College of Cardiology (ACC) Interventional Scientific Council and has served on the Program Committee for the American Heart Association Annual Scientific Sessions. He is the author of over 250 original scientific manuscripts, and has authored clinical practice guidelines and consensus statements on behalf of the American College of Cardiology (ACC), American Heart Association (AHA) and the Society for Cardiovascular Angiography and Interventions (SCAI), including Chairing the Best Practices in the Cardiac Catheterization Laboratory document since 2012 that outlines operations for cardiac catheterization laboratories in the United States. Naidu is Founder and Past Chair of the Emerging Leader Mentorship (ELM) Program for SCAI (in partnership with ACC and the Cardiovascular Research Foundation), a national leadership pipeline initiated in 2010 that identifies and trains 12 interventional cardiologists every two years.

Naidu is a 2-term Trustee of the Society for Cardiovascular Angiography and Interventions, the primary professional society for physicians specializing in interventional cardiology, and was inducted into the International Andreas Gruentzig Society in 2016. An alum of the Brown University 8-year Program in Liberal Medical Education, Naidu is Past President of the Alpert Medical School of Brown University Alumni Association Board of Directors, and Trustee Emeritus of Brown University.

From 2019 to 2024, Naidu was Governor and President of The New York State Chapter of the American College of Cardiology, and President of The New York Cardiological Society. In 2021 he was named to the Top 100 Notable Leaders in NY Healthcare in Crain's New York Business for his work in the national cardiovascular response to COVID-19.

In an effort to improve awareness of Hypertrophic Cardiomyopathy more broadly and specifically among children and young adults, Naidu co-authored the children's book Lindsay's Big Heart in 2024 with co-author and patient advocate Lindsay Davis (model), which was featured on NBC News Daily with hosts Vicky Nguyen and Kate Snow. In 2024 Naidu was appointed to the New York Cardiac Advisory Council by Governor Kathy Hochul, advising on cardiovascular policy and data analytics throughout the State.

Naidu is current President of the Society for Cardiovascular Angiography and Interventions from 2025 to 2026, where he leads the global interventional cardiology community as its 48th president.

== Personal life ==
Naidu lives in Manhattan, New York with his son. His parents are the late Dr Sriram Naidu, cardiologist, and the late Dr Saraswati Naidu, a Nephrologist. His parents are from Karnataka state, India. He has a sister Dr SriLatha, an Ophthalmologist.

In his spare time, he likes to sing, collect original comic art, and follow the New York Knicks, and shares these on his Twitter / x account.
