= Harry Selker =

Medical researcher

Harry Selker is an American physician and medical researcher at Tufts University School of Medicine, where he serves as Dean of the Clinical and Translational Science Institute and executive director of the Institute for Clinical Research and Health Policy Studies. He is known for creating a class of "predictive instruments" built into electrocardiograph machines that help hospitals triage cardiac patients, and assist physician decision-making.

== Early life and education ==
Raised in Seattle, Washington, Selker attended Reed College, followed by medical school at Brown University. He later earned a Masters of Science in Public Health at the University of California Los Angeles, where he was a Robert Wood Johnson Foundation Clinical Scholar.

== Career ==
Starting in the 1990s, Selker devised a series of mathematical models for medical decision-making called "predictive instruments". These software tools can be loaded onto electrocardiograph machines or other medical devices. Using patient demographic information and analysis of the data from the medical device itself, the predictive instrument generates a probability in real-time of whether the patient was having a heart attack, or would likely need a particular treatment. This software was subsequently included a number of common medical devices.

Selker has led a number of studies relating to the glucose-insulin-potassium treatment cocktail known as GIK. In 2012, his IMMEDIATE Trial showed that early administration of GIK made cardiac arrest or death after a heart attack less likely, and reduced the amount of damage to the heart itself by 80%.

Selker is the author of two books: The Affordable Care Act as a National Experiment: Health Policy Innovations and Lessons, and Emergency Diagnostic Tests for Cardiac Ischemia.
