= Mark S. Blumenkranz =

American physician

- Born: October 23, 1950 (age 75)

Academic background
- Education: Brown University (A.B.); Alpert Medical School (M.D., M.M.S.)

Academic work
- Institutions: Bascom Palmer Eye Institute; Stanford University

Mark Scott Blumenkranz (born October 23, 1950) is an American physician, surgeon, businessman, and entrepreneur. He is a trained ophthalmologist and vitreoretinal surgeon, and has served as H.J. Smead Professor and Chairman of Ophthalmology of the Byers Eye Institute at the Stanford University School of Medicine since 1997. He has founded or served on the Board of Directors of a number of companies, including Oculex, Peak Surgical, Optimedica Corporation, MacuSight, and Adverum Biotechnologies. In addition, he serves as a trustee of Brown University.

== Early life and education ==
Blumenkranz was born in New York City and grew up in upstate New York. He attended Brown University, where he earned a bachelor's degree, medical degree, and master's degree in biochemical pharmacology. He attended Stanford University for residency in ophthalmology, where he was chief resident, and University of Miami Bascom Palmer Eye Institute for a vitreoretinal fellowship.

== Academic career ==
Blumenkranz began his academic career as an assistant professor at University of Miami Bascom Palmer Eye Institute from 1980–1985. He moved to Michigan in 1985, where he became a clinical associate professor at Kresge Eye Institute, Wayne State University School of Medicine. He has been a professor at Stanford University since 1992, and has served as the chairman of ophthalmology at Stanford since 1997.

== Entrepreneurship ==
Blumenkranz has founded a number of successful Silicon Valley start-up companies, beginning in the 1980s. Notably, he was on the Board of Directors of Oculex Pharmaceuticals, which was later sold to Allergan. He was on the board of directors of MacuSight, which was later sold to Santen, Inc. He was a founder and board member of OptiMedica Corporation (later sold to Abbott Medical Optics), Peak Surgical (later sold to Medtronic), and Adverum Biotechnologies.

== Awards ==
Blumenkranz has won the American Academy of Ophthalmology Life Achievement Award (2008), the Foundation Fighting Blindness Visionary Award (2009), AOA Brown University (2011), and the AAO Jackson Memorial Lecture (2013).

== Personal life ==
Blumenkranz is married to Recia Kott Blumenkranz, MD, and has three children, Carla, Scott, and Erik.
