= Program in Liberal Medical Education =

Medical program in Brown University

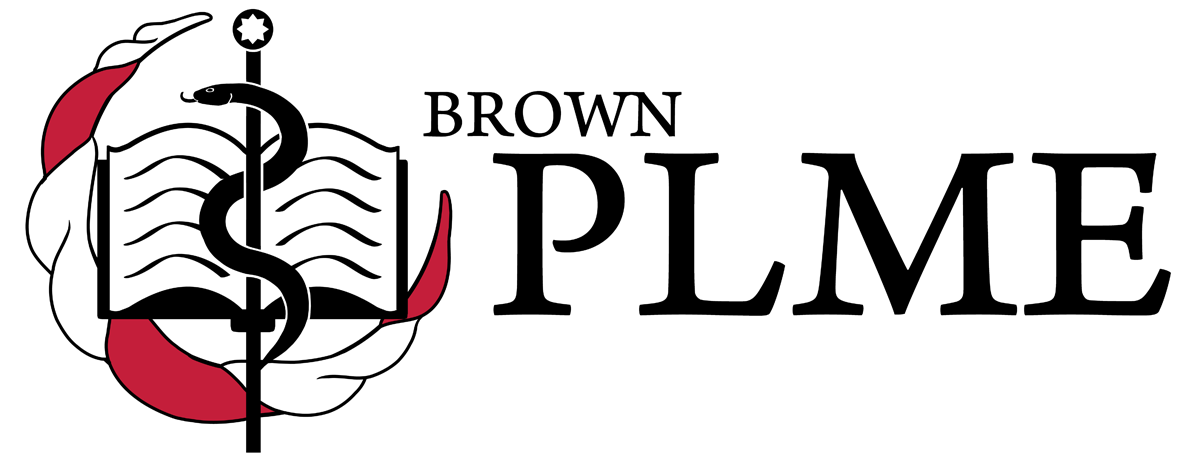
- Type: Combined baccalaureate-MD program
- Established: 1984; 42 years ago
- Affiliation: Brown University
- Students: Approximately 60 per class
- Location: Providence, RI, USA

The Program in Liberal Medical Education, or PLME, is an eight-year combined baccalaureate-M.D. medical program offered by Brown University. Members of the program are simultaneously accepted into both the undergraduate College of Brown University as well as the Warren Alpert Medical School, allowing them to receive a bachelor's degree and an M.D. as part of a single eight-year continuum. The PLME is the only combined medical program in the Ivy League, as well as one of only approximately 120 in the nation. The program is highly selective, admitting fewer than 90 applicants nationwide and internationally each year, with an acceptance rate of 2.19% for the class of 2026. The PLME is widely considered to be one of the most competitive and prestigious combined medical programs in the country.

== History ==
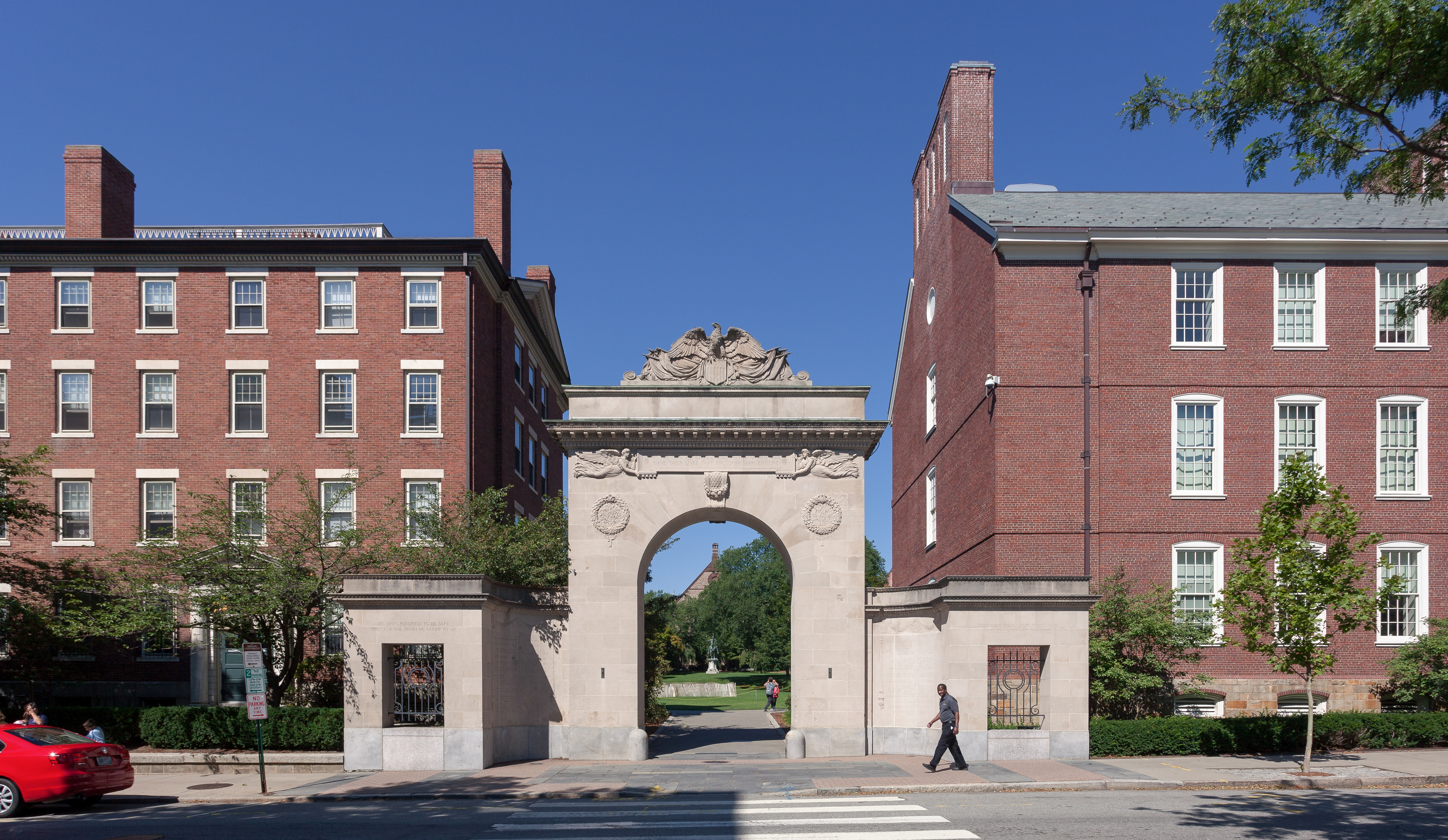
The entrance to Brown's campus on College Hill

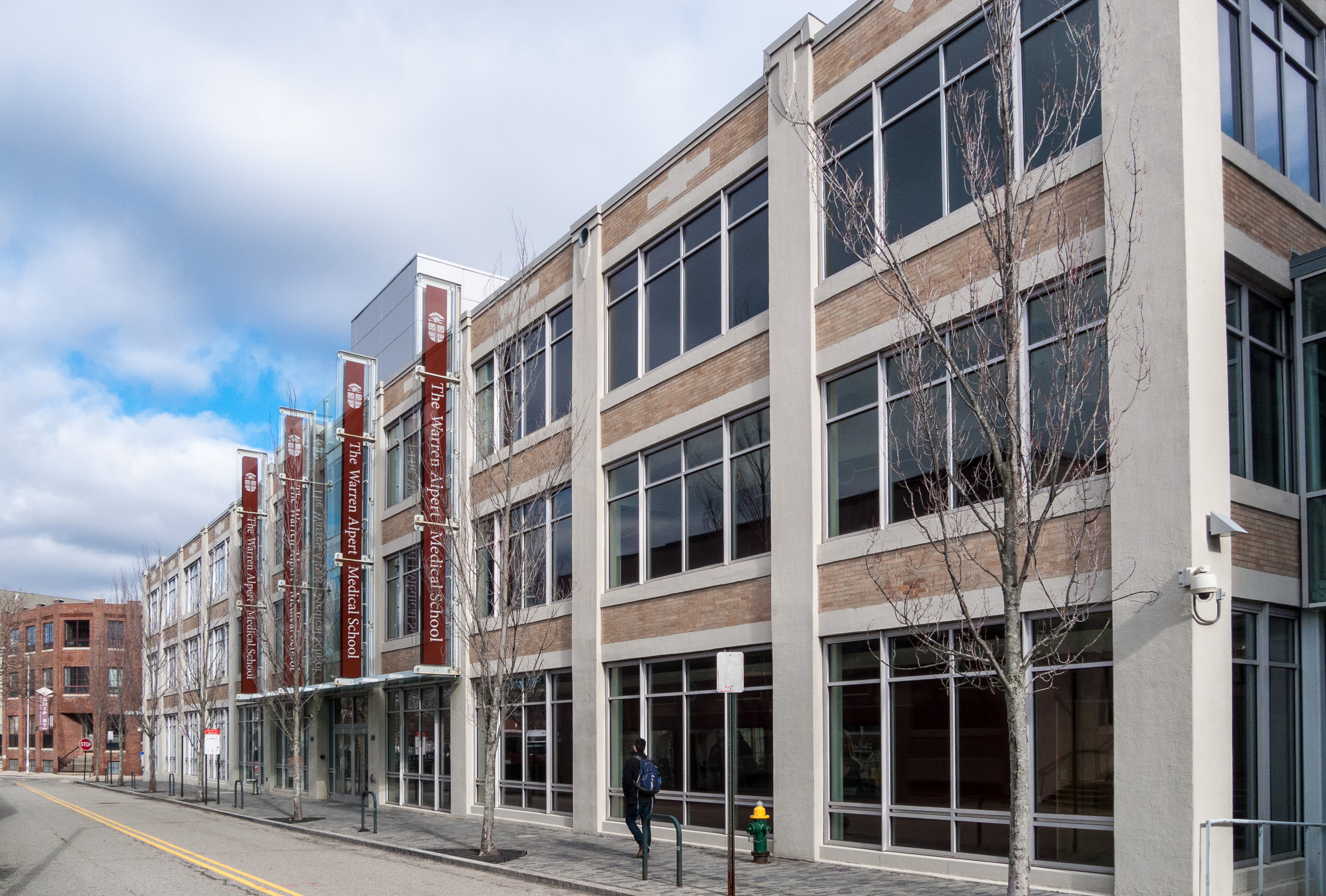
The Alpert Medical School's Richmond Street building

The 8-year Program in Liberal Medical Education was inaugurated in 1984. Since 1963, the university had offered a 6-year combined undergraduate/Master of Medical Science program. The PLME program was originally the primary route of admission to the Alpert Medical School, until the medical school began accepting pre-medical students through the standard AMCAS admission route in 2004.

According to the university, the goal of the program is to combine the Open Curriculum of the College and the competency-based curriculum concept of the Alpert Medical School to encourage students of medicine to pursue in depth their interests in the humanities, social sciences, and natural sciences through a liberal education philosophy as they prepare for their careers as physicians. Julianne Ip, M.D., Associate Dean of Medicine for PLME, described the program as a way to "accept the 'best' high school students who would utilize Brown, and the College’s unique Open Curriculum to craft their own educational paths. These individualized educational plans would allow students to pursue their passions be they in science or liberal arts but always with the view of medicine as a humanitarian pursuit, not a “trade” to be learned."

== Admissions ==
Because the PLME draws applicants from around the U.S. and internationally, its applicant pool is significantly larger than those of most other BS/MD programs, which receive primarily in-state applications. With large numbers of applicants competing for very few spots, the program consistently reports a low acceptance rate. For the undergraduate class of 2026, 3,827 high school students applied and 84 were admitted, yielding an acceptance rate of 2.19%. The average SAT scores of matriculants between 2019 and 2022 were 748 in Evidence-Based Reading and Writing and 779 in Math.

== Notable alumni ==
Graduates from the PLME are alumni of Brown University, but members of the program specifically have become prominent figures in the medicine and health world as well as in other areas.

- Atul Butte, (B.A. 1991, M.D. 1995) – Priscilla Chan and Mark Zuckerberg Distinguished Professor, University of California, San Francisco; biotechnology entrepreneur
- Bobby Jindal, (B.A. 1991) – 55th Governor of Louisiana, and former member of the U.S. House of Representatives; forfeited his place in the medical school to pursue studies in health policy at Oxford University through the Rhodes Scholarship
- Chirinjeev Kathuria (1988, M.D. 1993) – investor and entrepreneur, co-founder of Ocean Biomedical
- Srihari S. Naidu, (Sc.B. 1993, M.D. 1997) – Director, Cardiac Catheterization Laboratory and Hypertrophic Cardiomyopathy Treatment Center at Westchester Medical Center; Professor of Medicine, New York Medical College
- Erica Schwartz (B.Sc. 1994, M.D. 1998) – former Deputy Surgeon General of the United States
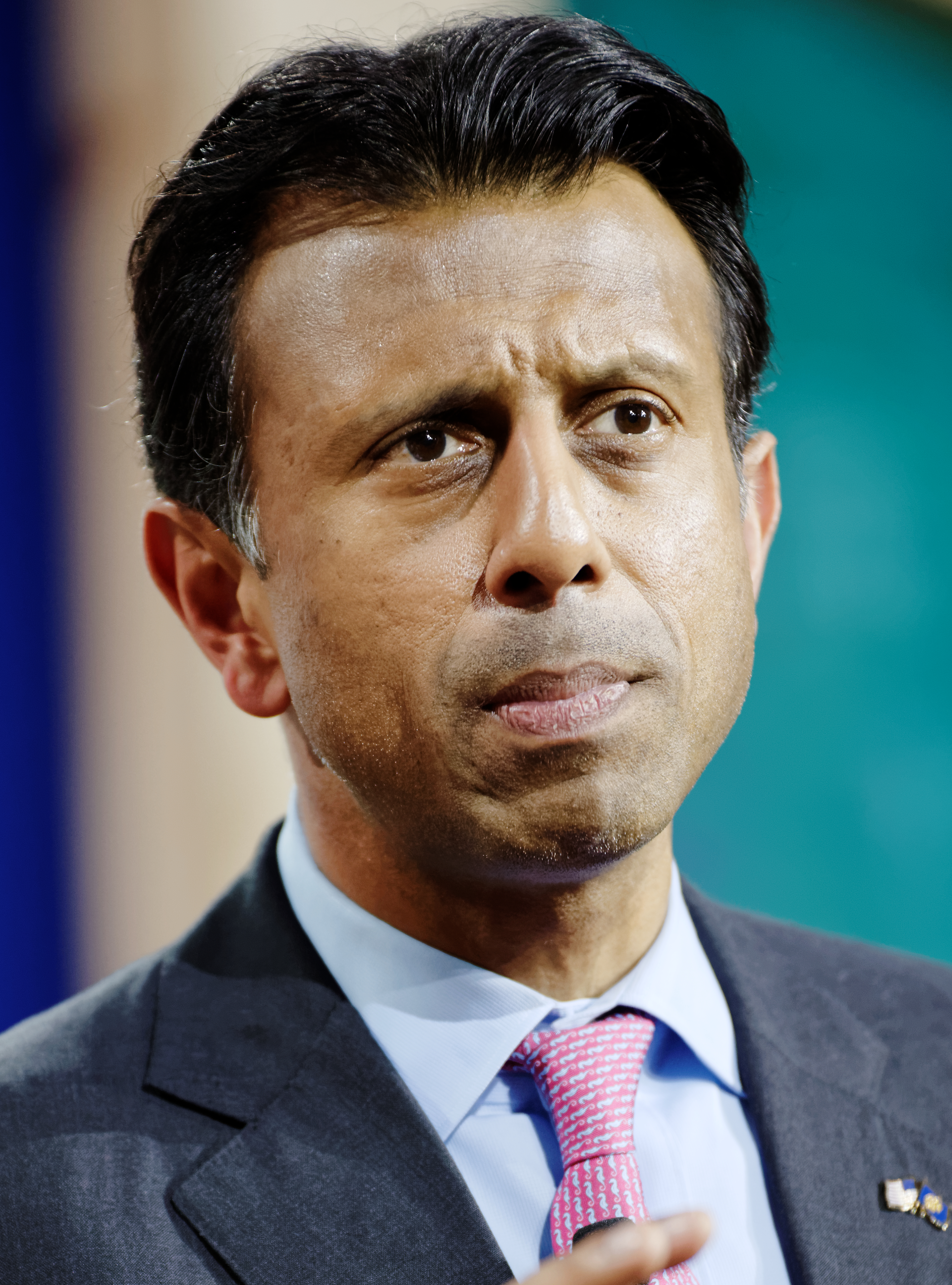
Bobby Jindal ('91), 55th Governor of Louisiana, and former member of the U.S. House of Representatives

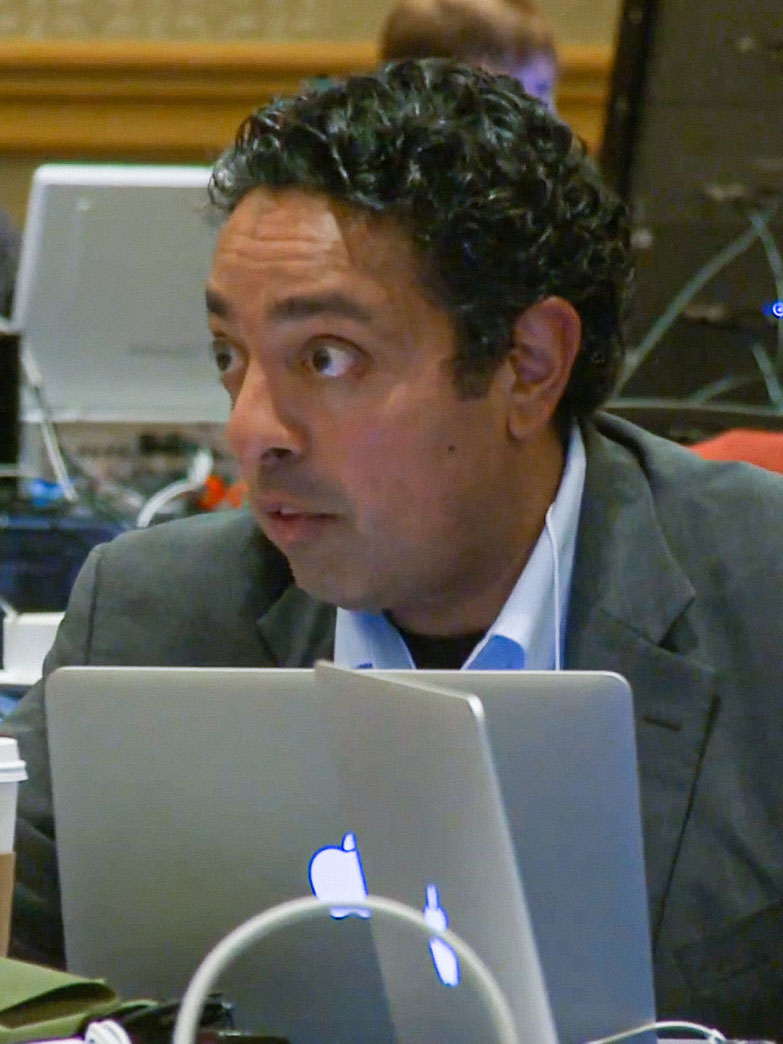
Atul Butte ('91, MD '95), Priscilla Chan and Mark Zuckerberg Distinguished Professor, UCSF

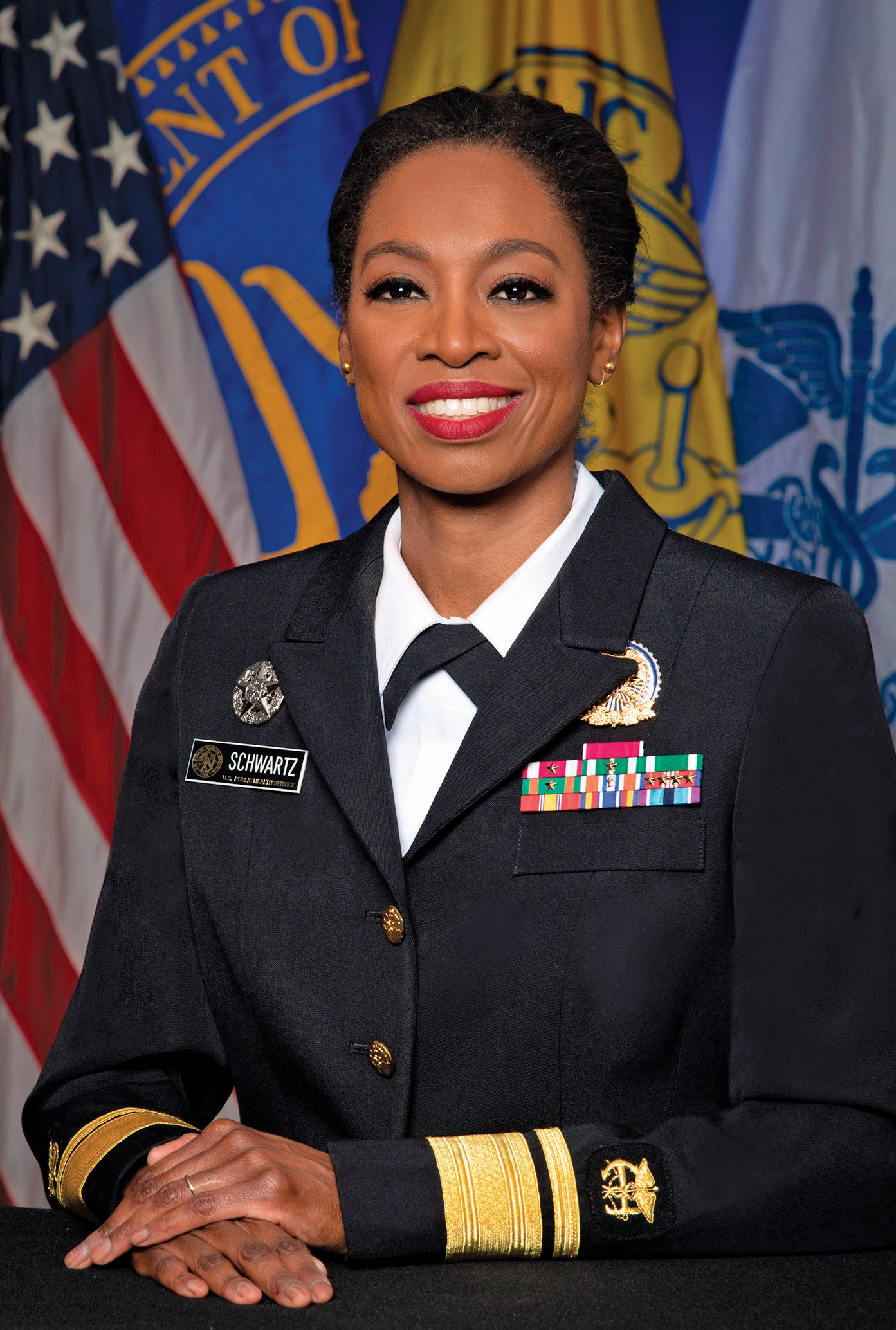
Erica Schwartz ('94, MD '98), Deputy Surgeon General of United States
