= Mukesh Jain =

Physician-scientist

Mukesh K. Jain
- Education: University of Buffalo (BS, MD)
- Scientific career
- Workplaces: Case Western; Brown University

Mukesh K. Jain is an American physician-scientist specializing in cardiovascular medicine. Since March 2022 he has served as Dean of Biological Sciences at Brown University and Dean of Medicine at the Warren Alpert Medical School. Jain previously served as Chief Scientific Officer at University Hospitals Health System and Vice-Dean for Medical Sciences at Case Western Reserve University.

== Education ==
Jain was born in the 1960s. He received a bachelor of science in biochemistry from the University of Buffalo in 1987. He earned his M.D. from the University of Buffalo's Jacobs School of Medicine and Biomedical Sciences in 1991. Jain completed his residency in internal medicine at Beth Israel Deaconess Medical Center in Boston, Massachusetts.

== Career ==
He subsequently completed fellowships at the Harvard T.H. Chan School of Public Health and at Brigham and Women's Hospital/Harvard Medical School.

Jain worked at Harvard from 1998 to 2006, serving as an Instructor of Medicine, Assistant Professor, and later Director of the Cardiovascular Transcriptional Biology Program at Brigham and Women's Hospital. Jain joined Case Western in 2006 as the founding Director of the Case Cardiovascular Research Institute, Professor of Medicine, and Ellery Sedgwick Jr. Chair and Distinguished Scientist. He was appointed Vice Dean for Medical Sciences at the university in 2016. In August 2021 he was appointed Distinguished University Professor.

In October 2021, Jain was appointed Dean of Medicine and Biological Sciences at Brown University. He began as dean in March 2022, succeeding Jack A. Elias.

== Advocacy ==
Jain is a vocal supporter of physician-scientists and advocate for increasing their ubiquity in the field. In a 2020 article in The Washington Post Jain, Paul J. Utz, and Vivian G. Cheung wrote "we need a well-trained group of readied physician-scientists who can be deployed at any time to meet our nation’s medical needs, whether a coronavirus pandemic or other health emergencies."
