= Peter LeWitt =

American neurologist

- Education: Alpert Medical School
- Occupation: Neurologist

Peter LeWitt is an American neurologist. He is the Sastry Foundation Endowed Chair Professor in the department of neurology at Wayne State University.
