= Eli Adashi =

American physician and scientist

Eli Y. Adashi
- עלי עדשי
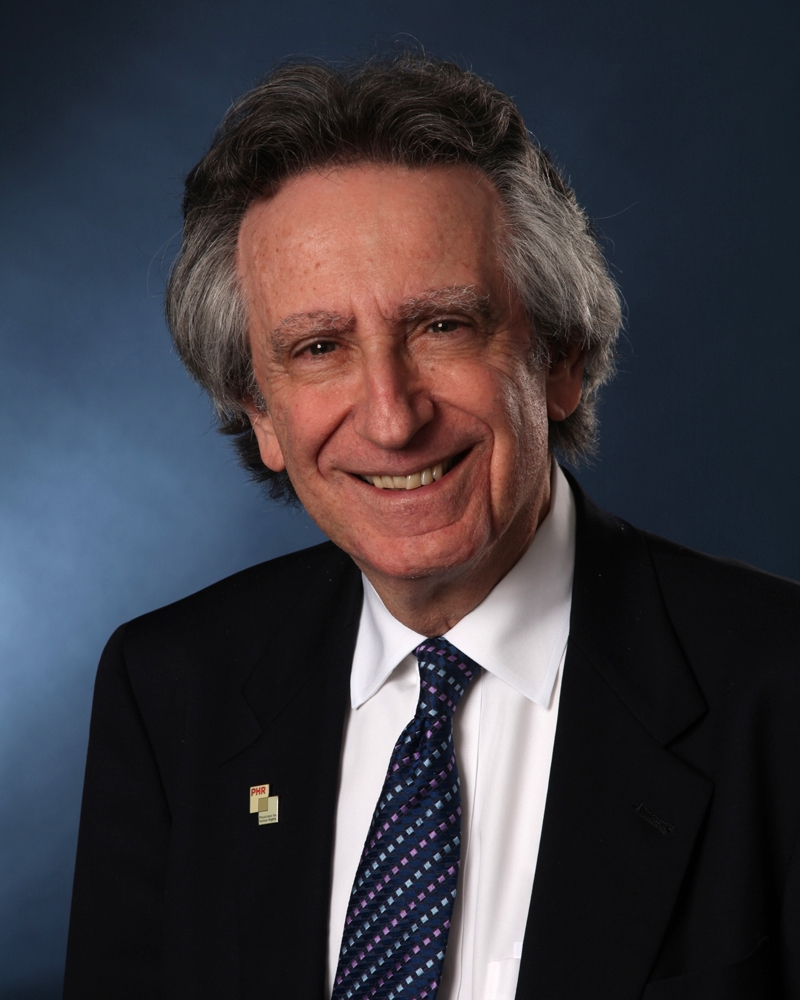
- Born: 1945 (age 80–81); Haifa, Israel
- Education: Tel Aviv University (MD); Harvard University (MPH)
- Awards: President's Achievement Award, Society for Gynecologic Investigation (1989); SRI-Pardi Distinguished Scientist Award, Society for Reproductive Investigation (2015); Lifetime Achievement Award, the American Society for Reproductive Medicine (2018)

Eli Y. Adashi (Hebrew: עלי עדשי; born 1945) is an American-Israeli physician and scientist who served as the Fifth Dean of Medicine and Biological Sciences at Brown University. Adashi is presently a tenured Professor of Medical Science with the Warren Alpert Medical School of Brown University. A Distinguished Medical Alumnus of Johns Hopkins University School of Medicine, Adashi is a member of the National Academy of Medicine, the New York Academy of Sciences, and the Association of American Physicians (AAP). Adashi is also a fellow of the American Association for the Advancement of Science (AAAS), the Hastings Center–Ethics Research Institute, and the Royal Society of Medicine. Honorary degrees were awarded by Poznan University (Poland), the University of Ottawa (Canada), and the University of Rosario (Argentina).

== Early life and education ==
Adashi was born and raised in Haifa in 1945, the only child of German-speaking professionals who departed Europe in the mid-1930s for what was then a British Mandate of Palestine. Adashi’s mother, an Austrian national by birth, was a highly successful kindergarten teacher on Mount Carmel in the city of Haifa. Adashi’s father, a Czech national by birth, was an engineer whose lifelong career was spent with the Nesher Israel Cement Enterprises in Haifa. A member of the first graduating class of the Tel Aviv University School of Medicine, Adashi received his medical degree in 1973. Following a year-long Rotating Internship at the Meir Medical Center in Kfar Saba, Israel, Adashi undertook Residency Training in Obstetrics and Gynecology at Tufts University School of Medicine in Boston, Massachusetts (1974-1977). Adashi received further training in Reproductive Endocrinology and Reproductive Biology at Johns Hopkins University School of Medicine in Baltimore, Maryland and at the University of California at San Diego School of Medicine, respectively (1978-1981).

== Appointments ==
Adashi's first faculty appointment was as an Associate Professor and Director of the Division of Reproductive Endocrinology with the Department of Obstetrics and Gynecology at the University of Maryland School of Medicine in 1981. Upon the 1995 passing of M. Carlyle Crenshaw, Jr., MD, then the Chair of the Department of Obstetrics and Gynecology at the school, Adashi was appointed Acting Chair, a role he served in through 1996.

At that point, Adashi relocated to the University of Utah and was honored with the John A. Dixon Endowed Presidential Professor and Chair of the Department of Obstetrics and Gynecology. Three years into his tenure with the University of Utah, in 1999, Adashi founded the ovarian cancer program at the Huntsman Cancer Research Institute.

In 2004, Adashi was appointed as the Frank L. Day Professor of Biology as well as the Dean of Medicine and Biological Sciences at Brown University. Upon his appointment, at the request of Brown's Corporation and Administration, Adashi worked to expand the medical student body (then 60-70 matriculants/year), codify the then piloted Pre-Med application process, design a new integrated medical education curriculum, rank in the top quartile of U.S. medical schools, and reconstitute the divisional leadership team.

As a result of Adashi's work, Brown's MD class of 2011 grew to be 96 strong, the largest class of MD students at Brown at that time. Additionally, Pre-Med matriculants (~1% of ~3,000 undergraduate applicants/year) became a regular component of Brown's student body. A new and integrated preclinical curriculum was established, replete with a novel two year long Doctoring course and an innovative Scholarly Concentration Program. A rise of 12 rungs in the U.S. News & World Report research rankings tied Brown's medical school with its counterparts at Dartmouth College and the University of lowa, while outranking 75% of all accredited U.S. medical schools.

During Adashi's tenure, and with his active leadership, the university received a gift of $100 million from the Warren Alpert Foundation thereby assuring the establishment of a medical school facility off of College Hill. With accreditation of the Medical School secure through 2013, re-designed and improved medical student advising, upgraded physical facilities, expanded compensation for pre-clinical teaching faculty, expanded summer research assistantships, greatly improved U.S. Medical Licensing Examination test scores, a strong residency matching record, implementation of three new combined degree programs (MD/MPH, MD/MPP and MD/MPA), the introduction of online admission (Banner®) and assessment (OASIS®) systems, an increasingly paperless faculty affairs office, improved outreach to alumni, a strategic communication and marketing plan, a substantially increased total endowment (to $327 million; an 80% increase since 2004), a growing financial aid endowment (to $69 million; a 50% increase since 2004), an ambitious annual fund, growing balanced budgets (to $130 million; a 60% increase since 2004), the introduction of the national AOA honor society, 2 new endowed chairs committed to ongoing innovation in medical education, and a new medical education building in the planning phases, Brown's newly named Alpert Medical School was soundly positioned for further progress.

During Adashi's tenure with the University of Utah, he was elected to the Institute of Medicine (now the National Academy of Medicine) in 1999, wherein he served on multiple committees. Adashi also served as a Review Coordinator for 30 Academy Consensus and Workshop Reports and as Chair of the National Academy of Medicine (NAM) Interest Group on Maternal & Child Health and Human Development. Adashi also served two 2-year terms of membership with the NAM Board on Health and Science Policy.

A former Franklin fellow and Senior Adviser on Global Women's Health to the Secretary of State Office of Global Women's Issues during the 1st term of the Obama Administration, Adashi is a member of the Advisory Council of The Hastings Center, a former member of the Board of Governors of Tel Aviv University, and the chair of the Medical Executive Committee and the Medical Advisory Council of the Jones Foundation for Reproductive Medicine.

Adashi is a former member of the Board of Directors of Physicians for Human Rights and of the Council on Foreign Relations, the Global Agenda Council on Population Growth of the World Economic Forum, and the Medicare Evidence Development & Coverage Advisory Committee (MEDCAC) of the Centers for Medicare and Medicaid Services (CMS). Adashi is also a former advisor to the National Committee for Quality Assurance (NCQA), the World Health Organization (WHO), the World Bank, the Rockefeller Foundation, and the Bill and Melinda Gates Foundation. A former Examiner and Director of the Division of Reproductive Endocrinology of the American Board of Obstetrics and Gynecology (ABOG), Adashi served as President of the Society for Reproductive Endocrinology and Infertility (SREI; 1998–1999), the Society for Gynecologic Investigation (SGI; 1999–2000), and the American Gynecological and Obstetrical Society (AGOS; 2002–2003).

== Research Contributions ==
Adashi was the recipient of continuous National Institute of Health funding from 1985 to 2005, inclusive of a Research Career Development Award. As a mentor to over 50 postdoctoral trainees and the author or co-author of over 700 PubMed-indexed, peer-reviewed publications, Adashi edited or co-edited 16 books in the general area of Reproductive Medicine with an emphasis on Ovarian Biology.

Adashi's work also saw press with the New York Times, the Washington Post, the Boston Globe, the Huffington Post, and several other media venues. He has delivered multiple academic presentations in Europe, Japan, Korea, China, Taiwan, Australia, and South America.

Adashi's service with the NIH included membership with the National Council of the National Institute of child Health and Human Development (1997-2001), the Reproductive Endocrinology Study Section (1988-1992), and the Selection Committee of the Reproductive Scientist Development Program (1988-2005).

Adashi is the former Editor-In- Chief of Seminars in Reproductive Medicine and a former Associate Editor of Endocrinology, Journal of the Society for Gynecologic Investigation, Reproductive Medicine Review, Seminars in Reproductive Endocrinology, Reproductive Medicine Review, and Reviews in Endocrine and Metabolic Disorders.

Adashi's research is focused on the biology of the ovary and the role of growth factors and cytokines in this context. Ongoing scholarly contributions to medical education and to the discipline of reproductive medicine are equally noteworthy in his career. Since 2008, Adashi has undertaken to focus on matters of policy at the nexus of medicine, law, ethics, human rights, and social justice.

== Awards and recognition ==
- USPHS Research Career Development Award (RCDA), NICHD, NIH (1986–1991)
- The President's Achievement Award, Society for Gynecologic Investigation (1989)
- Annual Research Award, Society for the Study of Reproduction (SSR) (1996)
- First Prize Award, The American Medical Writers Association Medical Book Award (1996)
- Distinguished Scientist Award, the American Society for Reproductive Medicine (ASRM) (1999)
- Fellow ad Eundem, The Royal College of Obstetricians and Gynaecologists (FRCOG) (2000)
- President d’Honneur à titre Etranger, The Societé Francaise de Gynécologie (2001)
- Franklin Fellow, US Department of State, Office of Global Women's Issues (2009–2010)
- W.W. Keen Award for Outstanding Contributions to Medicine, Brown University (2010)
- SRI-Pardi Distinguished Scientist Award, The Society for Reproductive Investigation (2015)
- Doctor Honoris Causa, The Poznan University of Medical Sciences, Poznan, Poland (2016)
- Doctor Honoris Causa, The University of Ottawa, Ottawa, Canada (2018)
- Lifetime Achievement Award, The American Society for Reproductive Medicine (2018)
- Certificate of Special Congressional Recognition, Members of US Congress (Sponsor: James R. Langevin) (2018)
- Honorary Member, European Society of Human Reproduction and Embryology (2019)
- Elected as a Fellow of The Hastings Center Ethics Research Institute (2020)

== Personal life ==
Adashi is married to Toni Sach-Silberman, a former actress with the Habima Theatre in Israel. They have one son, Judah E. Adashi, DMA, who is a professor of music, a composer, and a faculty member at the Peabody Institute of the Johns Hopkins University.
