= Adverum Biotechnologies =

American gene therapy company

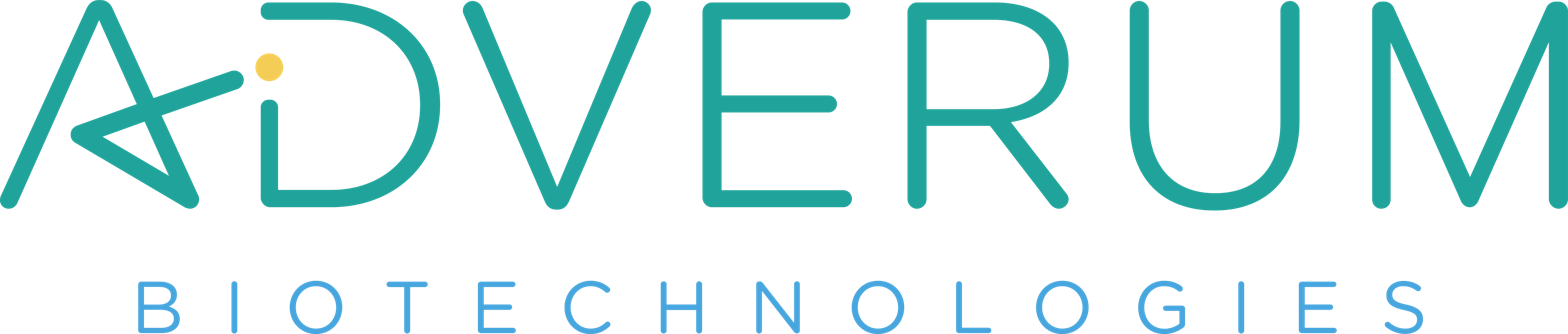
- Formerly: Avalanche Biotechnologies
- Type: Public
- Traded as: Nasdaq: ADVM; Russell 2000 Component
- Industry: Biotechnology; Gene Therapy
- Founded: 2006; 20 years ago
- Founders: Thomas W. Chalberg; Mark S. Blumenkranz; Mitchell H. Finer; Steven D. Schwartz
- Headquarters: Redwood City, California
- Key people: Laurent Fischer; (CEO); Leone Patterson; (president & CFO); Peter Soparkar; (CLO); Angela Thedinga; (CTO)
- Owner: Eli Lilly and Company (2025-present)
- Number of employees: 100
- Website: adverum.com

Adverum Biotechnologies, Inc. (formerly Avalanche Biotechnologies) is a publicly traded clinical-stage gene therapy company based in Redwood City, California. It develops gene therapies, including wet age-related macular degeneration (wet AMD).

== History ==
Avalanche Biotechnologies was founded in 2006 by Tom Chalberg, Mark Blumenkranz, Mitchell Finer, and Steven Schwartz. In 2015, a year after raising $102 million when it went public through an IPO, Chalberg stepped down as CEO following Phase IIa trial results that were labeled as "iffy".

Upon acquiring Annapurna Therapeutics and changing its name to Adverum Biotechnologies in May 2016, it also changed its ticker symbol on Nasdaq from AAVL to ADVM. In October, former Annapurna CEO Amber Salzman became CEO of Adverum.

In May 2018, Salzman left Adverum, and Chief Medical Officer Athena Countouriotis resigned after less than one year in the job. In October 2018, Leone Patterson was named the new CEO of Adverum.

In September 2019, Adverum announced six-month data from the first cohort of its phase I trial. The stock price dropped 50% due to investor concerns over deterioration of vision that these trial subjects suffered, as well as several reports of occular inflammation.

In 2020, Laurent Fischer replaced Patterson as CEO of Adverum. In January 2022, the FDA granted Orphan Drug Designation to Adverum's ADVM-062, developed as a single intravitreal administration for blue-cone monochromacy by delivering a functional copy of the OPN1LW gene.

In September 2022, Adverum announced that its first patient was dosed in the LUNA phase 2 clinical trial; the trial evaluates development for the treatment of wet age-related macular degeneration.

In December 2025, it was announced that the company had been acquired by Eli Lilly and Company.
