= Lindsay Davis (model) =

American model

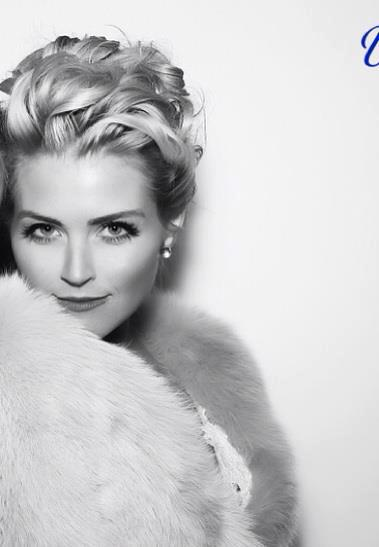
- Lindsay Davis at the 2013 Golden Globe Awards in Beverly Hills.
- Born: November 6, 1985; Lakewood, Ohio, U.S.
- Modeling information
- Height: 5 ft 4 in (1.63 m)
- Hair color: Blonde
- Eye color: Blue
- Website: LindsayLoveDavis.com

Lindsay Davis (born November 6, 1985) is an American model and beauty queen who has been internationally published in magazines such as Ralph and FHM. She was crowned Miss Ohio U.S. International in 2010, Miss Ohio United States 2011 and was also a finalist in the Miss Ohio USA pageant for both 2010 and 2011.

She is known for the championing of "Lindsay's Law" in the Ohio Legislature.

Davis was a classically trained ballerina up until age 17, when she was diagnosed with the heart condition hypertrophic cardiomyopathy.

== Activism and charity work ==
Davis, a sufferer of hypertrophic cardiomyopathy, supports many cardiac related organizations such as HCMA, The American Heart Association, and an organization providing year round activities for Children with Heart Disease. In 2010, she founded her own charity, Hearts-4-Hearts that provides young people afflicted with heart disease peer support. Davis works with other charities for Parkinsons, Juvenile Diabetes, and Animal Protection. She also volunteers at local children's hospitals. In 2013, she studied fashion modeling law at Fordham University Law School and hopes to improve modeling industry standards and establish fair working rights for models. As of 2013, she was using her own experience with her heart to create awareness and get the Ohio Bill SB252 aka "Lindsay's Law" passed along with Senator Cliff Hite and The Simons Fund Foundation. SB252 deals with protecting student athletes from sudden cardiac arrest.

== Filmography ==
Year	Title	Role	Notes
2010	Entourage	Beverly Hills Model	HBO
2010	90210	Popular Girl	CW
2011	Mr Sunshine	Hot Vegas Girl	ABC
2011	Franklin and Bash	Stir Supermodel	TNT
2011	Friends with Benefits	Heidi Klum/Adriana Lima look alike model-waitress	NBC
2011	The Playboy Club	Playboy Bunny (reoccurring)	NBC
2011	Law and Order Criminal Intent	Rex's Girl	NBC
2011	White Collar	Mobster Girlfriend	USA
2011	Blue Bloods	Angela Pascucci	CBS
2011	Gossip Girl	Audrey Party Model	CW
2012	American Reunion	Hottie	Universal
2012	White Collar	Ring Girl	USA
2013	Can a Song Save Your Life?	Bubbleyums Girlfriend	Exclusive Media Group
2013	We're the Millers	Girlfriend	Warner Bros.
2013	Vegas	Dixon bathing beauty interest	CBS
2013	The Hunger Games: Catching Fire	Cashmere's stylist	Lionsgate
2014-2016	Broad City	Melody	Comedy Central
