= Open Curriculum (Brown University) =

Undergraduate program at Brown University

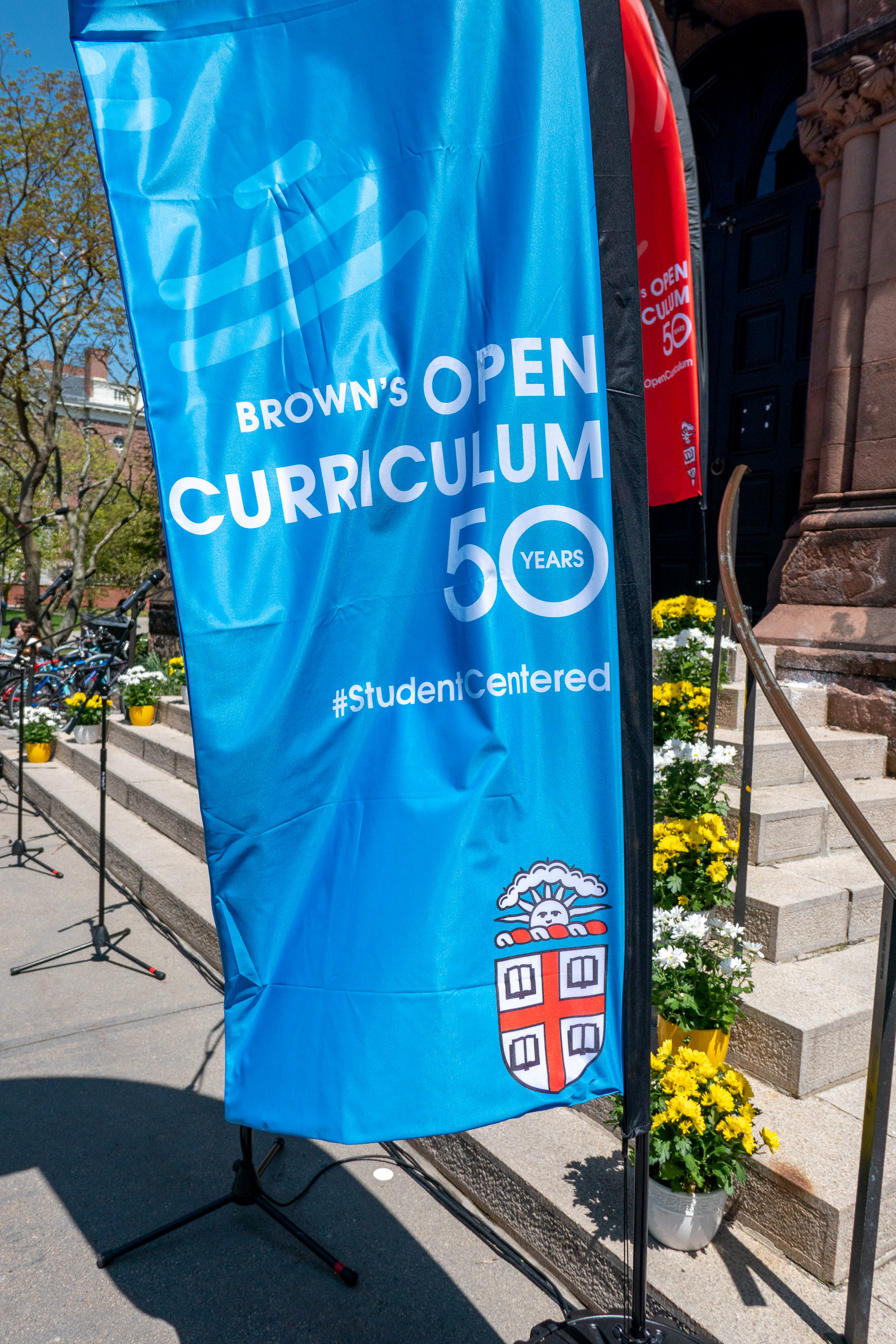
Brown celebrated the 50th anniversary of the Open Curriculum in 2019

Brown University is well known for its undergraduate Open Curriculum, which allows students to study without any course requirements outside of their chosen concentration (major). To graduate from Brown's College, students need only have taken 30 courses, completed a concentration, and demonstrated fluency in the writing of English. Adopted in 1969 after the circulation of a report by Brown undergraduate students Ira C. Magaziner and Elliott E. Maxwell, the open curriculum distinguishes Brown from peer schools—particularly those with core curricula, like Columbia University and the University of Chicago—and has become one of the university's best-known attributes.

== History ==
From its founding in 1764 as one of America's nine Colonial colleges, Brown (originally called Rhode Island College) was characterized by a spirit of openness: it became the first college in the United States to accept students regardless of their religious background, a practice dating from its founding charter.

While in early years Brown's curriculum was similar to that of Princeton (where Brown's first president, James Manning, had studied), with its emphasis on the Classics, President Francis Wayland instituted a series of curricular reforms in the 1850s, aimed at modernizing and diversifying Brown's offerings. With Wayland's reforms, students could now study modern languages, and applied sciences. Another important influence on the development of the Open Curriculum was the institution of "University Courses" in 1958: these were intimate discussion-style classes that were interdisciplinary in their nature, and therefore affiliated with no single department.

In 1966, seventy Brown undergraduates formed a Group Independent Study Program to scrutinize Brown's curriculum, and propose reforms. By 1968, the group comprised twenty-five students, two of whom, Ira Magaziner and Elliott Maxwell, wrote a substantive 400-page report, "Draft of a Working Paper for Education at Brown." The report called for the institution of several reforms, including:

- The elimination of all distribution requirements in favor of an "Open Curriculum"
- The elimination of pluses and minuses when grading
- The option to take courses on a Satisfactory/No Credit basis rather than receiving traditional grades
- The introduction of "Modes of Thought" courses for freshmen

Though Brown's administration was at first reluctant to entertain the report, eventually a faculty meeting was called after Maxwell and Magaziner personally visited every Brown professor. After a two-day faculty meeting, Brown's faculty agreed to implement the New Curriculum.

=== 50th anniversary ===
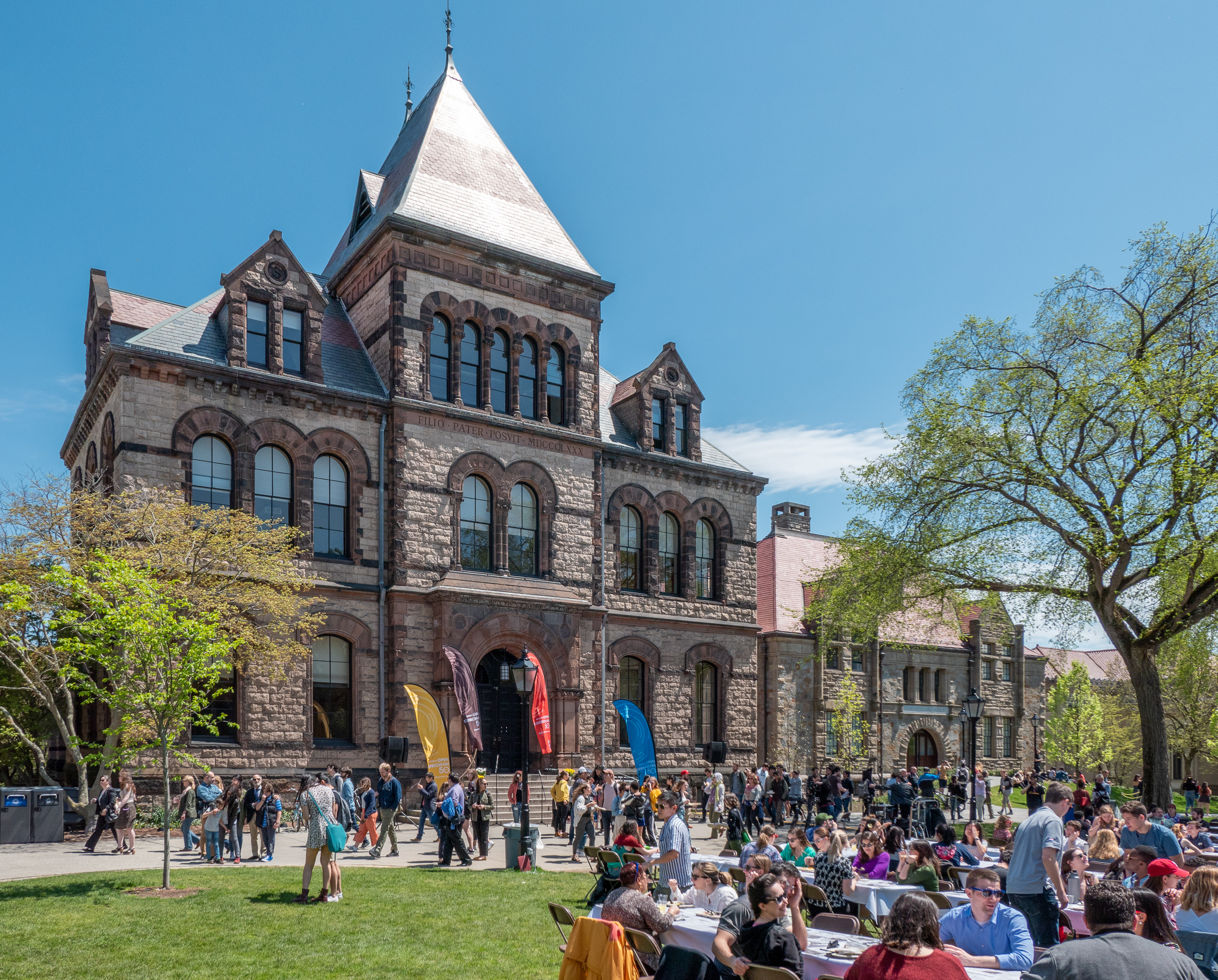
Brown's 2019 celebration of the 50th anniversary of the Open Curriculum opened with a picnic on the Main Green

In May 2019, Brown began a 12-month commemoration and celebration of the 50th anniversary of the Open Curriculum. A steering committee was established to guide the "community exploration," which included a picnic, readings, speaking programs, and other events.
