= Edward Beiser =

American political scientist (1942–2009)

Edward Beiser (March 10, 1942 in New York City – September 4, 2009 in Warwick, Rhode Island) was an American political scientist, constitutional scholar, law professor and medical ethicist who taught at Brown University from 1968 to 2003. He also served as associate dean of Brown's medical school.

Beiser was widely regarded as an authority on the Rhode Island Supreme Court. He was a court-appointed special master during the trial of Klaus von Bulow.

Beiser was a graduate of the City College of New York and held a Ph.D. in political science from Princeton University and a law degree from Harvard Law School. He taught at Williams College from 1965 to 1968 prior to joining the Brown faculty.

== Select publications ==
- The Rhode Island Supreme Court: A Well-Integrated System. Law & Society Review, 1973.
- Ethics and Public Policy. Audio Cassette & VHS. The Great Courses, 1994.
