= Alpert Medical School =

Medical school of Brown University

Coordinates: 41.819064°N 71.408276°W

Warren Alpert Medical School
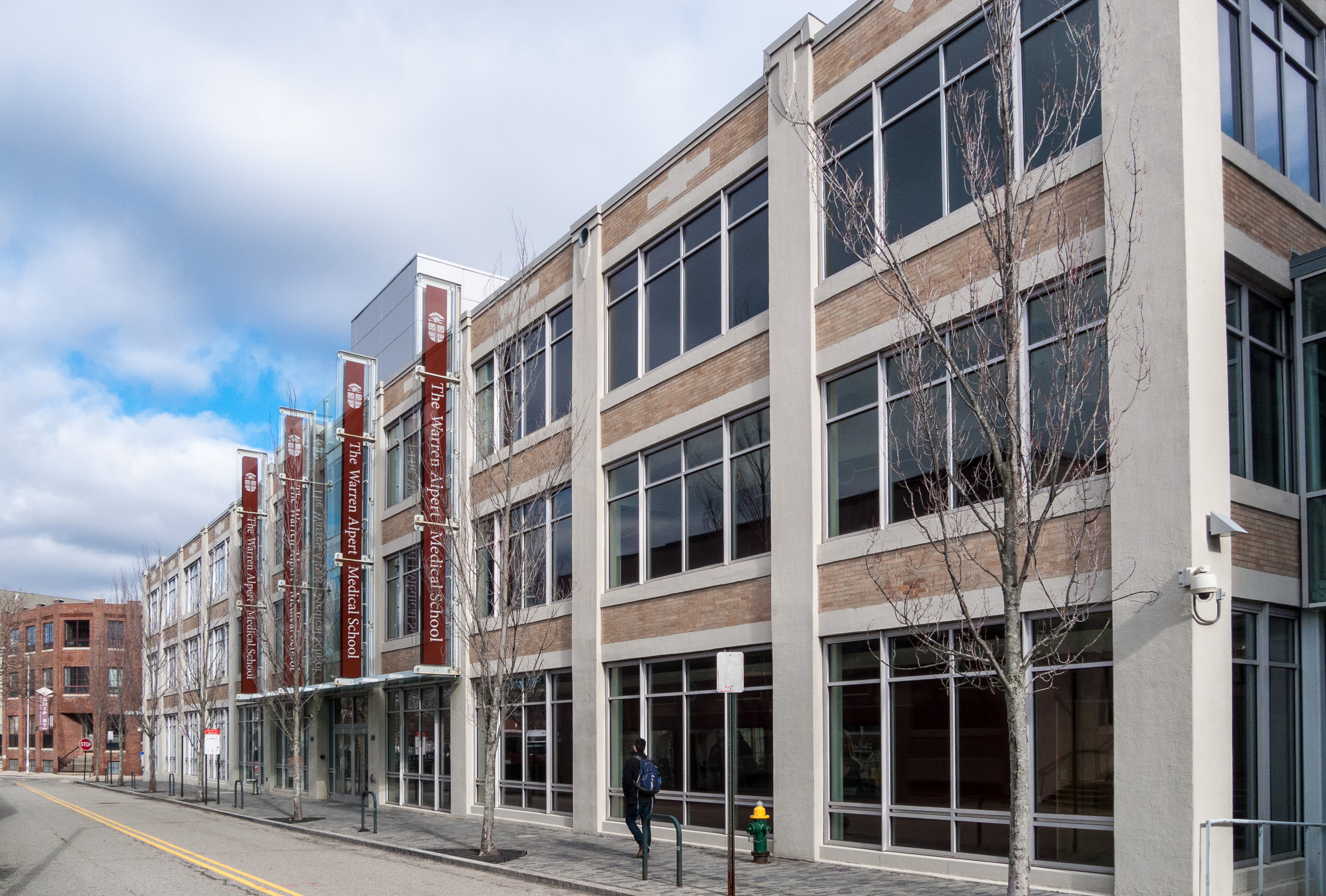
- Richmond Street building
- Former name: Brown University School of Medicine (–2000)
- Type: Private
- Established: 1811; 215 years ago 1972; 54 years ago
- Parent institution: Brown University
- Accreditation: LCME
- Dean: Mukesh Jain
- Faculty: 2,569
- Students: 466
- Location: Providence, RI, USA
- Campus: Urban
- Website: medical.brown.edu

The Warren Alpert Medical School (formerly known as Brown Medical School; previously known as Brown University School of Medicine) is the medical school of Brown University, located in Providence, Rhode Island. Originally established in 1811, it was the third medical school to be founded in New England after only Harvard and Dartmouth. (Note: While Yale chartered a medical school in 1810, instruction did not begin for another three years.) However, the original program was suspended in 1827, and the four-year medical program was re-established almost 150 years later in 1972, granting the first MD degrees in 1975.

The Warren Alpert Medical School is a component of Brown's Division of Biology and Medicine, which also includes the Program in Biology. Together with the Medical School's seven affiliated teaching hospitals, the Division has $300 million in external research funding per year.

== History ==
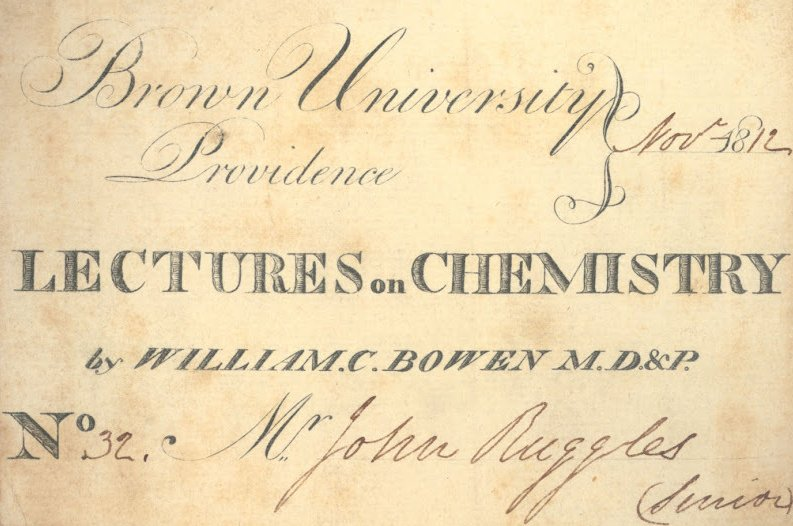
Cover of Dr. William C. Bowen's textbook, Lectures on Chemistry, written c. 1812 for students of Brown's medical school

=== Early history ===
Brown University first organized a medical program in 1811, with the appointment of three professors: Solomon Drowne, William Ingalls, and William Bowen. Natural history at Brown had previously been taught by physician Benjamin Waterhouse, a graduate of the University of Edinburgh Medical School, who went on to found Harvard Medical School. The establishment of Brown's program in medicine followed examples set by the university's New England neighbors, Harvard University and Dartmouth College which had established medical programs in 1782 and 1797, respectively.

After assuming office in 1827, Brown's fourth president, Francis Wayland, called for all faculty to reside on campus. Through a residency policy, Wayland intended to increase the supervision of the student body and improve discipline. In March 1827, the Corporation of Brown University resolved that, in order to receive a salary, all faculty would be required to reside on the school's campus. Serving as voluntary clinical faculty, the medical school's physicians refused to jeopardize their practices in order to comply with the policy.

In 1827, President Wayland suspended the fledgling medical program, suggesting that medical education might be reinstated at a later date. Between its establishment in 1811 and suspension in 1827, 87 students graduated from the school.

=== Modern history ===
In 1972, the Corporation of Brown University authorized the establishment of a four-year medical program. Known as the Program in Medicine, the program awarded its first degrees to a graduating class of 58 students in 1975. In 1991, the program was renamed the Brown University School of Medicine and in 2000 again renamed Brown Medical School.

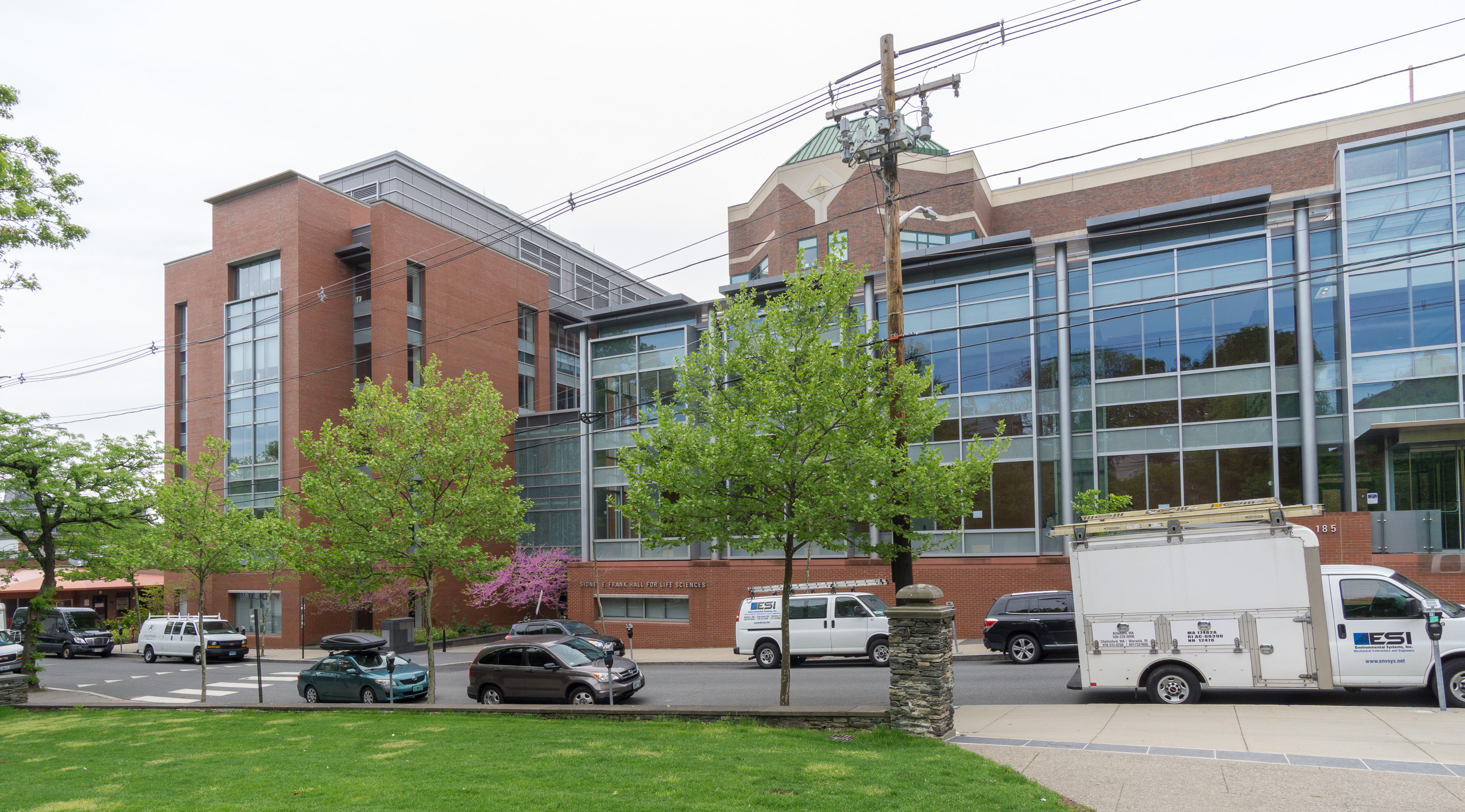
Sidney Frank Hall for Life Sciences

==== Expansion ====
Between 1972 and 2011, the school operated from facilities on Brown's College Hill campus, including the Bio–Med Center and Smith-Buonanno Hall. In 2006, the school opened the Sidney Frank Hall for Life Sciences, a 168,800-square-foot (15,680 m^{2}) life sciences complex for the Division of Biology and Medicine. Housing both research spaces and administrative offices, the construction of the building marked a significant expansion of the Division's facilities.

In January 2007, entrepreneur Warren Alpert donated $100 million to Brown Medical School, tying Sidney Frank for the largest single monetary contribution ever made to the university. In recognition of the gift, Brown Medical School was renamed to The Warren Alpert Medical School of Brown University. The funds contributed to the construction of a new medical education facility, medical student scholarships (through the Warren Alpert Scholars Program), support for biomedical research and faculty recruitment, and new endowed professorships.

In 2016 and 2018 the school received further gifts totaling $27 million and $56 million.

==== Jewelry District ====
Between 2003 and 2006, the university purchased a number of properties in Providence's Jewelry District to accommodate for the expansion of medical facilities beyond the historic College Hill neighborhood. In August 2011, the university completed the process of renovating a former industrial building at 222 Richmond Street to serve as the school's primary facility. Combined with another renovation project at adjacent 70 Ship Street, the opening of 222 Richmond Street marked the school's relocation from facilities primarily on College Hill to those primarily Downtown.

== Admissions and rankings ==
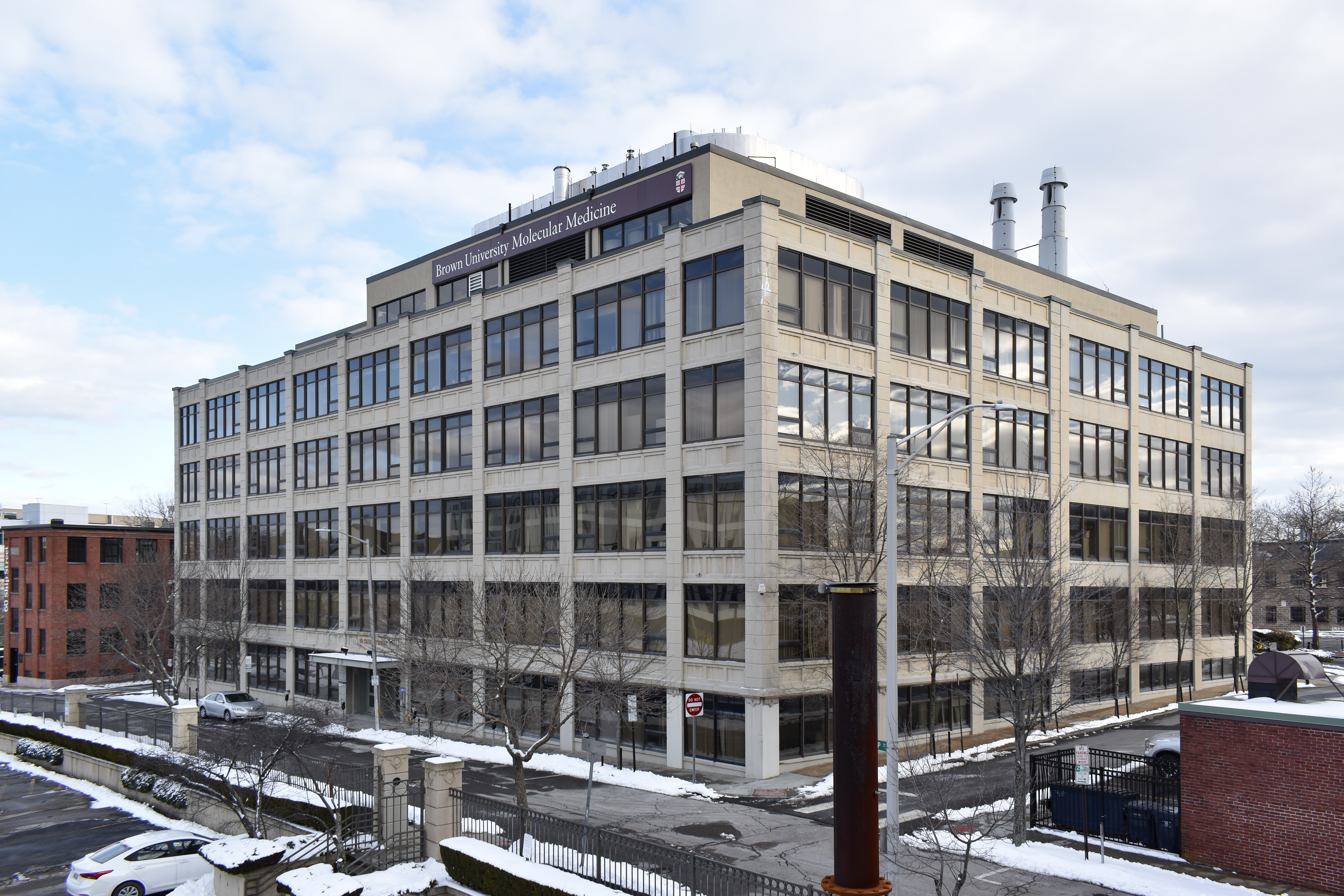
Brown University Laboratories for Molecular Medicine, one of the core research facilities of the medical school.

Brown Alpert Medical School is one of the seven Ivy League medical schools and is currently ranked 14th for primary care education and 35th for research by the 2023 U.S. News & World Report rankings. Alpert was ranked in the top 25 medical schools in the U.S. by both Business Insider and by a medical education rankings study conducted by Matthew J. Goldstein and colleagues at Harvard Medical School. Alpert enrolls approximately 144 students per class, and in 2017 was named by US News among the 10 most selective medical schools in the United States based on acceptance rate. In 2016, Alpert received 6,374 completed applications and interviewed 370 applicants for 90 spots open through the American Medical College Application Service (AMCAS). Other routes of entry include the eight-year Program in Liberal Medical Education (PLME) and a small number of linkage programs. The 2016 matriculating class had an average GPA of 3.8 and MCAT score of 514.

Students interested in studying at Alpert Medical School may apply through a variety of admissions routes designed to enroll a diverse and highly qualified student body. Approximately 30% of the entering class is composed of students from the 8-year Program in Liberal Medical Education (PLME) and special linkage agreement programs. In 2004, the school began to accept premedical students from other colleges and universities via AMCAS through a standard route of admissions. According to the school's website, for the Fall 2016 entering class, Alpert Medical School received 6,374 secondary applications and interviewed 370 candidates through the AMCAS route."

== Curriculum ==
A restructuring of the pre-clinical curriculum was implemented in 2006, with the goal of achieving an integrated, contemporary and flexible medical curriculum. Its design was predicated on the vision that tomorrow's physician must be an IT-savvy lifelong learner who is scientifically and clinically enlightened, familiar with alternative and complementary healing traditions, patient and service-centered, and who understands the economic underpinnings of the US health care system. At the heart of the curriculum redesign are the two-year basic science component (Integrated Medical Sciences I-IV), Doctoring (which focuses on clinical skills and professionalism), and the Scholarly Concentrations Program.

Integrated Medical Sciences I: IMS-I provides students with foundations of cell biology, cell physiology, biochemistry, nutrition, immunology and genetics, all of which are integrated with gross anatomy and microscopic anatomy. IMS-I also includes general pathology in which students are introduced to concepts underlying the mechanisms of disease. This foundation forms the basis for the subsequent systems-based blocks of IMS II through IV.

Brain Sciences, the first module of IMS II, integrates head and neck anatomy with neurobiology, behavior, pathophysiology and neuropharmacology. Microbiology is integrated with infectious diseases and relevant pharmacology and epidemiology. In the final block of IMS-II, Endocrinology, endocrine physiology has been incorporated into the endocrine pathophysiology, pathology and pharmacology content. Integrated Medical Sciences III and IV: Students continue with a systems-based approach in Year II: The course sections are cardiology, nephrology, pulmonology, hematology, gastroenterology, human reproduction, growth, and development, and supporting structures (dermatology, rheumatology, and orthopedics).

Doctoring is a required skills-based course for all first- and second-year medical students designed to teach the knowledge, skills, and attitudes of a competent, ethical, and humane physician. Students spend one half-day a week working alongside a physician-mentor. These sessions allow students to observe and practice clinical skills such as medical interviewing, history-taking, physical diagnosis, and professional conduct.

== Scholarly Concentrations Program ==
The Scholarly Concentrations Program is an elective program through which Alpert Medical School students may elect to pursue a course of study beyond that of the conventional medical education curriculum. Scholarly Concentrations offer students the opportunity to translate personal interests and activities into scholarship. Students who participate in a Scholarly Concentration will undertake rigorous independent scholarship in a cross-disciplinary field of interest related to medicine, public health, engineering, or a bio-medically relevant topic in the sciences, arts, or humanities.

Currently, students may pursue a Scholarly Concentration in the following areas: advocacy and activism, aging, caring for underserved communities, contemplative studies, disaster medicine, global health, health policy, informatics, integrative medicine, medical education, medical ethics, medical humanities, medical technology and innovation, physician as communicator, planetary health and women's reproductive health.

== Primary care–population medicine program ==
Using seed money from a $1 million Accelerating Change in Medical Education (ACE) grant from the American Medical Association, the Warren Alpert Medical School (AMS) of Brown University developed an MD-MSc program. The primary care–population medicine (PC–PM) program is an integrated dual-degree curriculum that focuses on preparing students for a career in medicine while providing training in population medicine. Students concurrently earn both the MD and an MSc in population medicine with four years of curriculum.

== PLME ==
In 1984, Brown endorsed an eight-year medical program called the Program in Liberal Medical Education (PLME). The PLME offers a unique opportunity to join undergraduate and professional studies in medicine in a single eight-year program. By combining the open curriculum concept of Brown (The College) and the competency-based curriculum concept of the Alpert Medical School, the PLME encourages students of medicine to pursue in depth their interests in the humanities, social sciences, and natural sciences even as they prepare for their careers as physicians.

Prospective students apply to this eight-year program before they begin their undergraduate education. The program is extremely selective, accepting only 90 students each year, and is considered among the most prestigious combined medical programs in the country. In 2020, 2,530 applicants applied for 88 spots, yielding an acceptance rate of approximately 3.47%. According to one source, over 23% of all admitted students to the PLME program enrolled in an admissions prep program. Students earn a Bachelor's degree in their concentration of choice after their fourth year and automatically enter the medical school to pursue their MD degree.

== Other programs ==
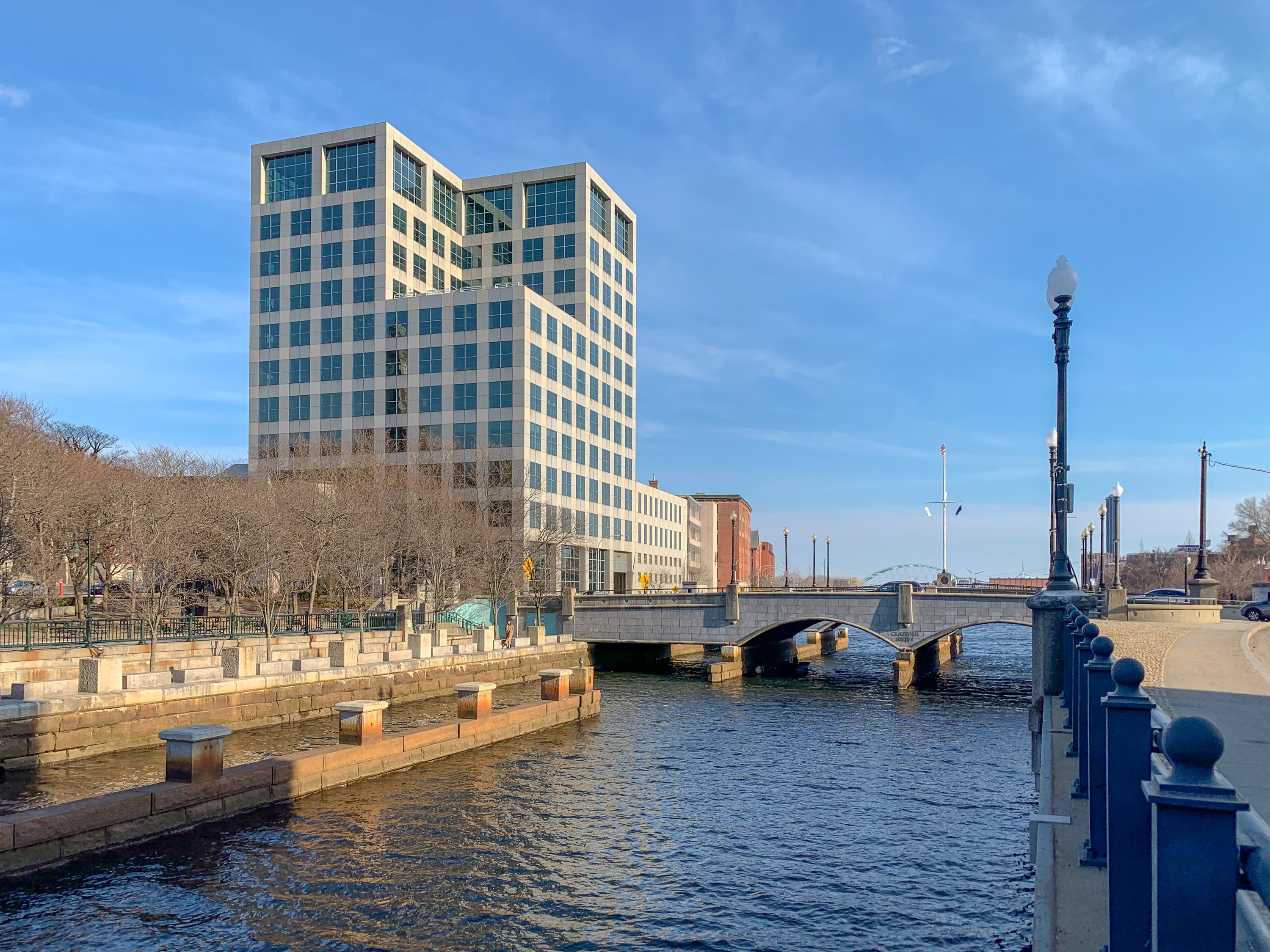
121 South Main Street, home to the Brown University School of Public Health. Proximity to the medical campus fosters collaboration between faculty and students of Alpert Medical School and the School of Public Health.

=== Early Identification Program ===
Since 1976, the Early Identification Program (EIP) was initiated to encourage Rhode Island residents to pursue careers in medicine by recruiting sophomores from Providence College, Rhode Island College and the University of Rhode Island. An EIP was also established with Tougaloo College to increase the number of underrepresented minorities in the medical school.

=== Brown-Dartmouth Medical Program ===
From 1981 to 2006, Brown offered a joint program with Dartmouth Medical School called the Brown-Dartmouth Medical Program. Approximately 15 students at Dartmouth Medical School enrolled in the program annually, spending the first two basic medical science years at Dartmouth and the next two years in clinical education at Brown, where they received their MD degree. The program was discontinued in the fall of 2006 after their respective deans stated that the institutions desired to move in their own directions.

Combined degree programs leading to the MD/PhD, MD/MPH, MD/MPP, and MD-MSc degrees are currently offered in conjunction with Brown's Graduate School, School of Public Health, and Watson Institute.

== Notable alumni and faculty ==
=== Faculty ===
Notable faculty include:

- Henry David Abraham, Nobel laureate
- Eli Y. Adashi, physician and academic
- Patrick Aebischer, President of the École Polytechnique Fédérale de Lausanne
- Rasha Alawieh, transplant nephrologist
- Edward Beiser, political scientist and medical ethicist
- Mary Carskadon, Professor of Psychiatry and Human Behavior; Prominent sleep researcher
- Sandra Carson, Principal innovator of the first artificial human ovary
- Wafik El-Deiry, Mencoff Family University Professor of Medical Science, Professor of Pathology and Laboratory Medicine
- David F. Duncan, Consultant to Bill Clinton's White House Office of National Drug Control Policy, Clinical Associate Professor of Medical Science
- Barry S. Fogel, Neuropsychiatrist
- Lynn Pasquerella, 18th president of Mount Holyoke College
- Frank Sellke, Karl Karlson and Gloria Karlson Professor and Chief of Cardiothoracic Surgery
- Peter A. Stewart, who developed a quantitative physicochemical approach to understanding acid-base physiology

=== Alumni ===
Notable alumni include:

- Arthur L. Horwich (BA 1972, MD 1975), discoverer of the role of chaperonins in protein folding
- Peter LeWitt (MD), Sastry Foundation Endowed Chair Professor at Wayne State University
- Lloyd B. Minor ( Sc.B. 1979, MD 1982), dean of Stanford University School of Medicine
- Seth Berkley (BA 1977, MD 1981), founder and former president and CEO of the International AIDS Vaccine Initiative
- Philip Kantoff (1976, MD 1979), former chairman of medicine at Memorial Sloan Kettering Cancer Center
- Erica Schwartz (BSc 1994, MD 1998) Deputy Surgeon General of United States

Other alumni include: Christopher G. Chute (AB 1977, MD 1982) and Peter Calabresi (MD 1988) of Johns Hopkins University, Jay Loeffler (MD 1982) and Neel Shah (BSc 2004, MD 2009) of Harvard University, Sally Satel (MD 1984) of Yale University, Mark S. Blumenkranz (AB 1972, MD 1975, MMSc 1976) and Mark Musen (Sc.B. 1977, MD 1980) of Stanford University, and Michael Shadlen (AB 1981, MD 1988) of Columbia University.

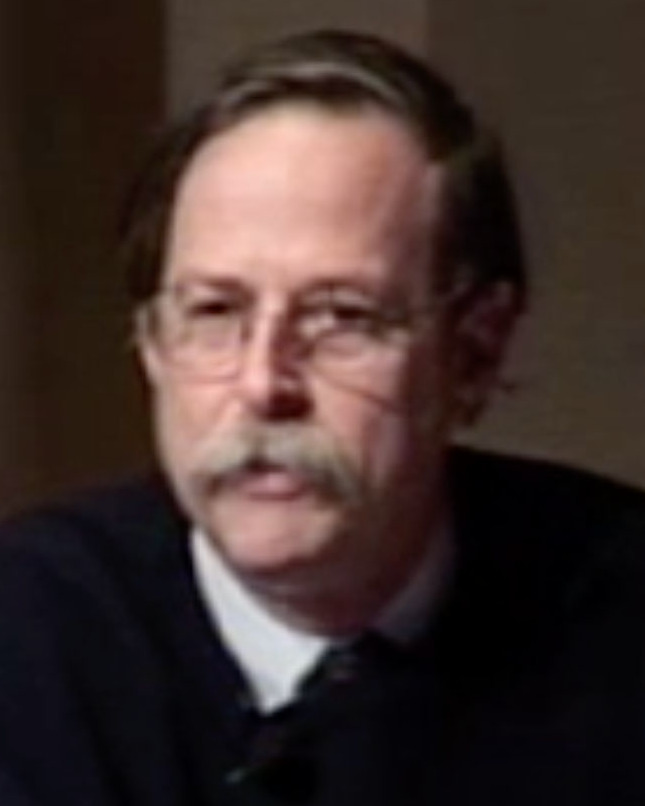
Arthur L. Horwich ('72, MD '75), renowned biologist and Sterling Professor at Yale School of Medicine

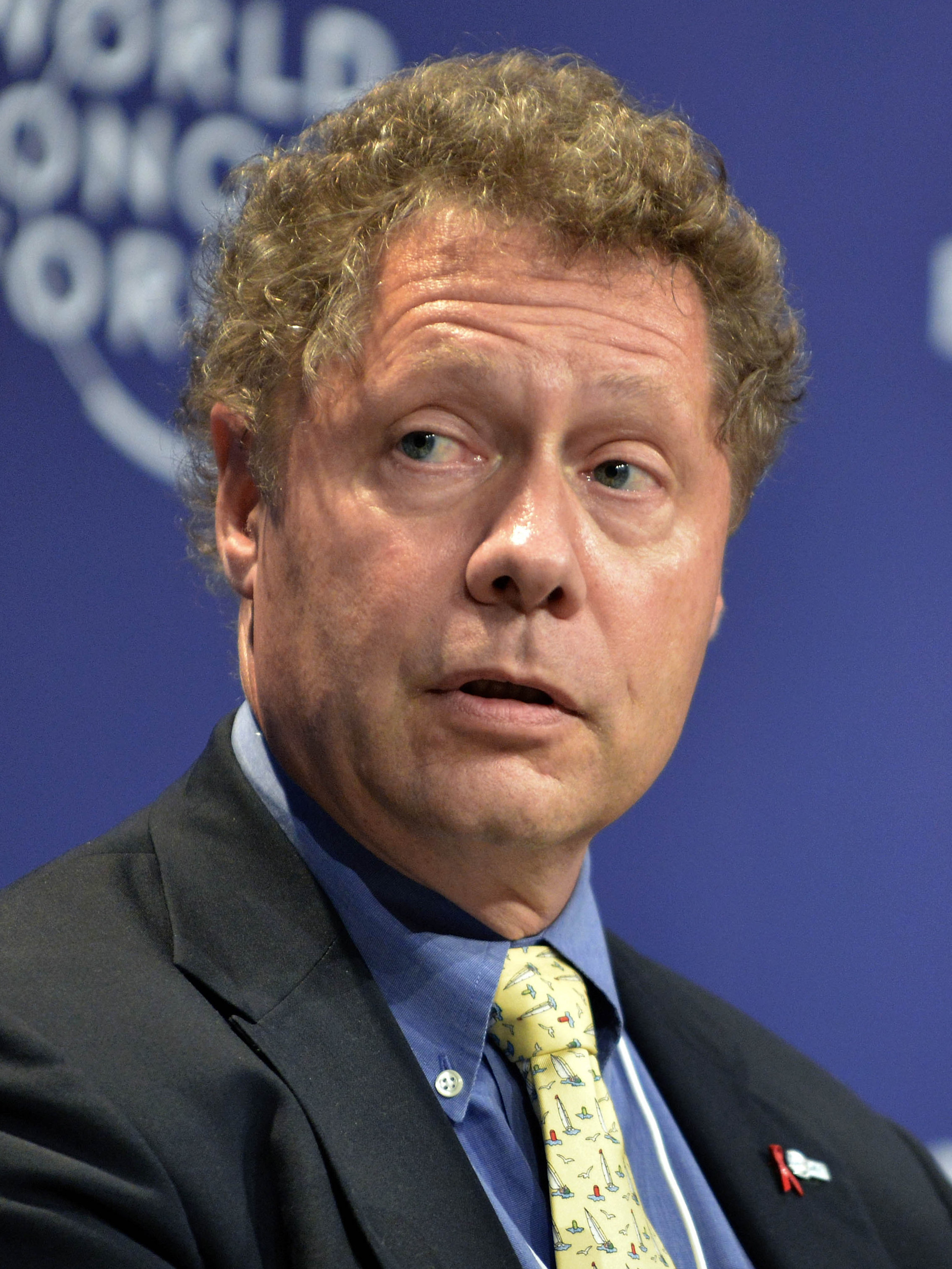
Seth Berkley ('77, MD '81), Adjunct Prof. of Medicine and founder of the Intl. AIDS Vaccine Initiative

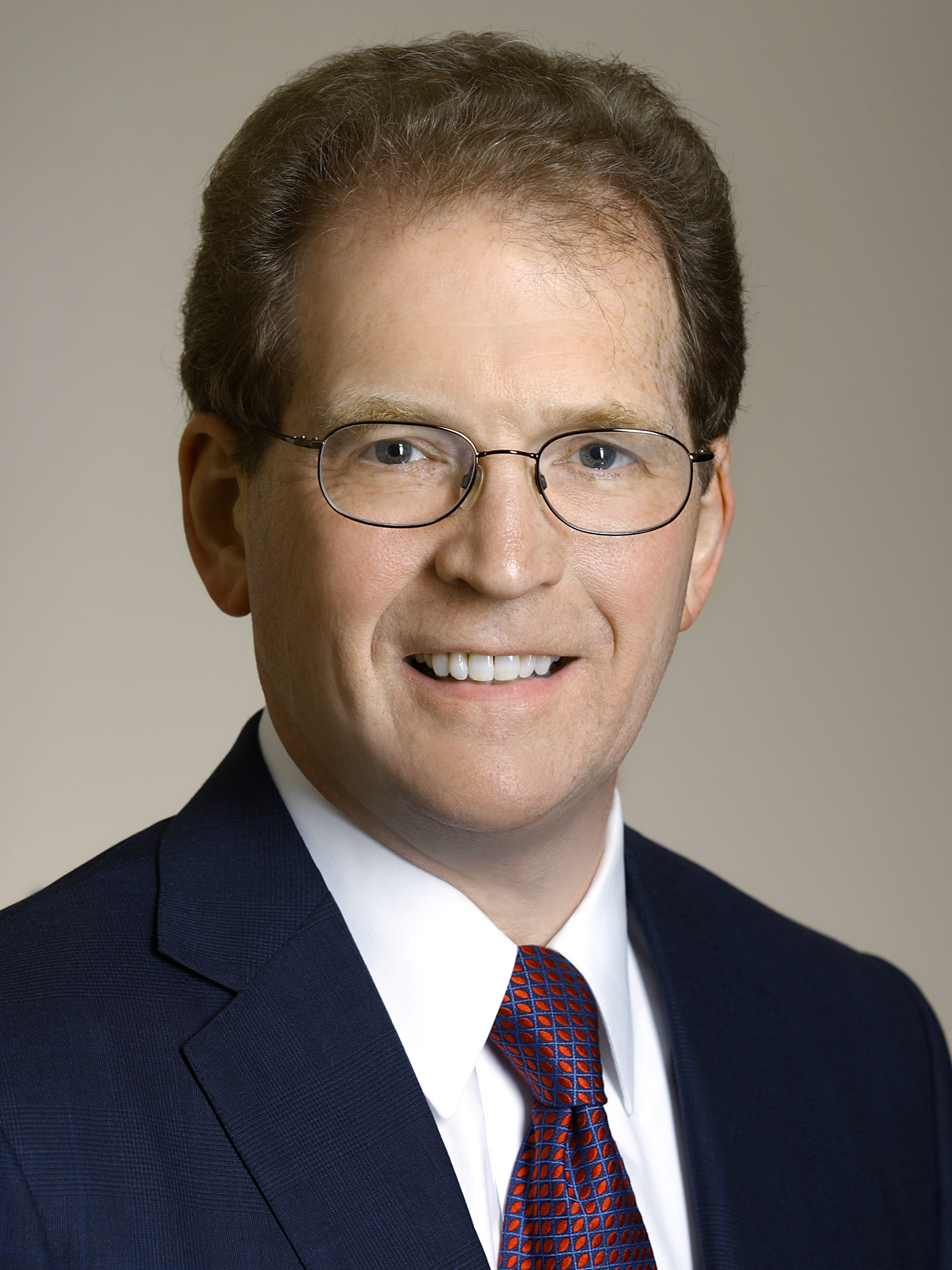
Lloyd B. Minor ('79, MD '82), Dean of Stanford University School of Medicine

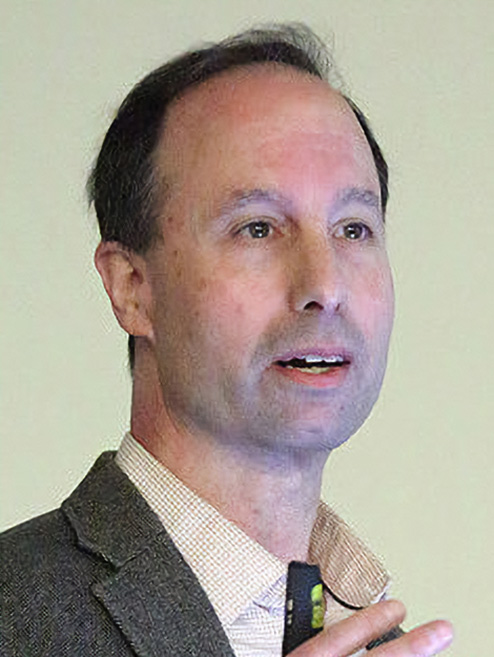
Michael Shadlen ('81, MD '88), Columbia neuroscientist and HHMI Investigator

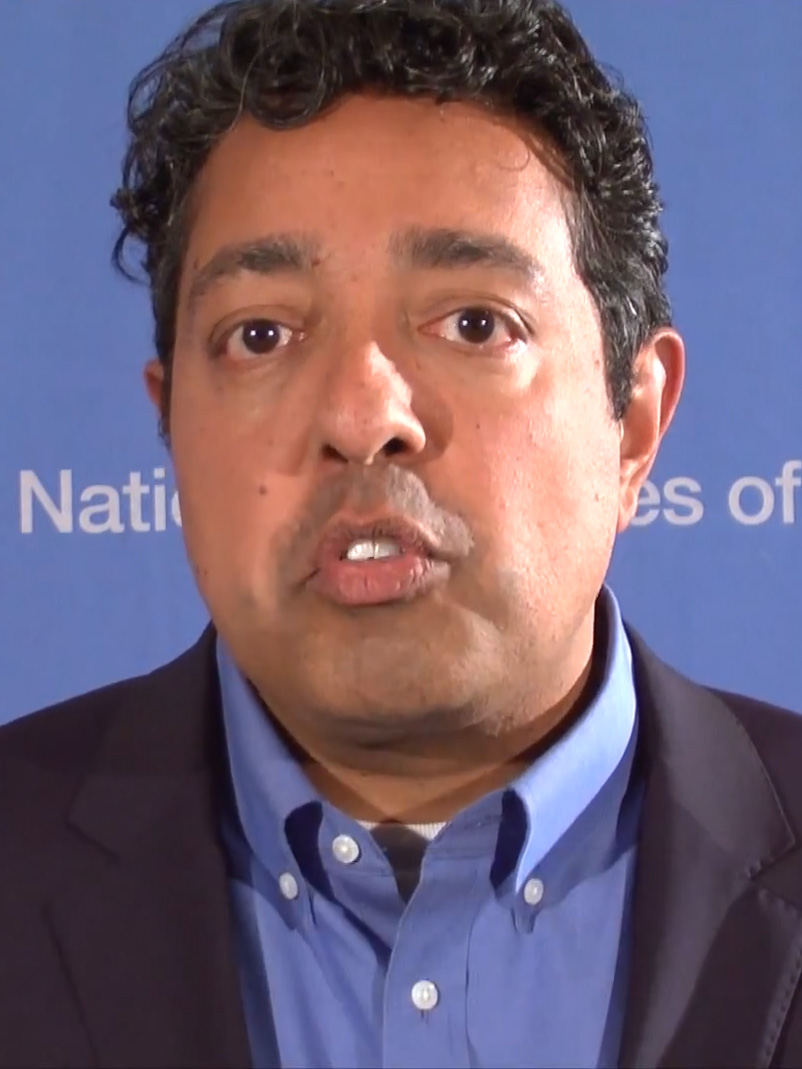
Atul Butte ('91, MD '95) Priscilla Chan and Mark Zuckerberg Distinguished Professor at UCSF

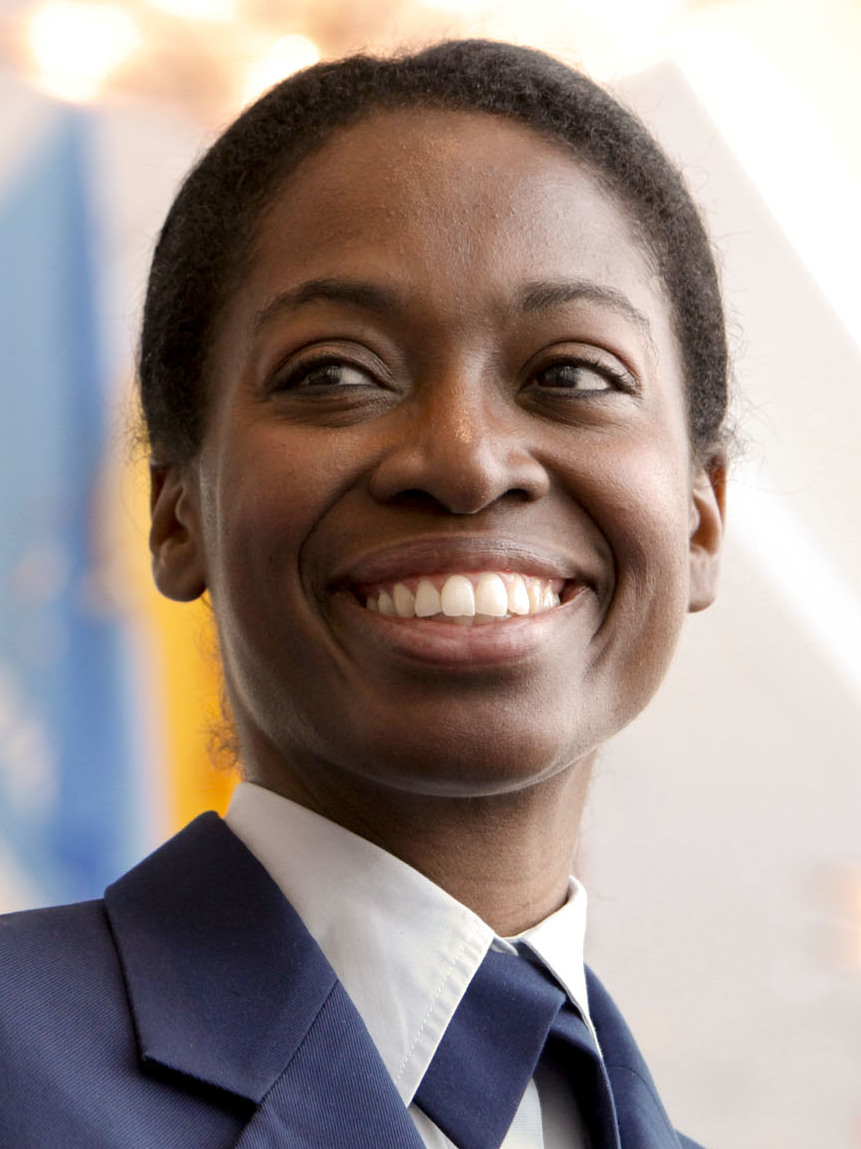
Erica Schwartz ('94, MD '98), Deputy Surgeon General of United States

== Teaching affiliates ==
Teaching affiliates
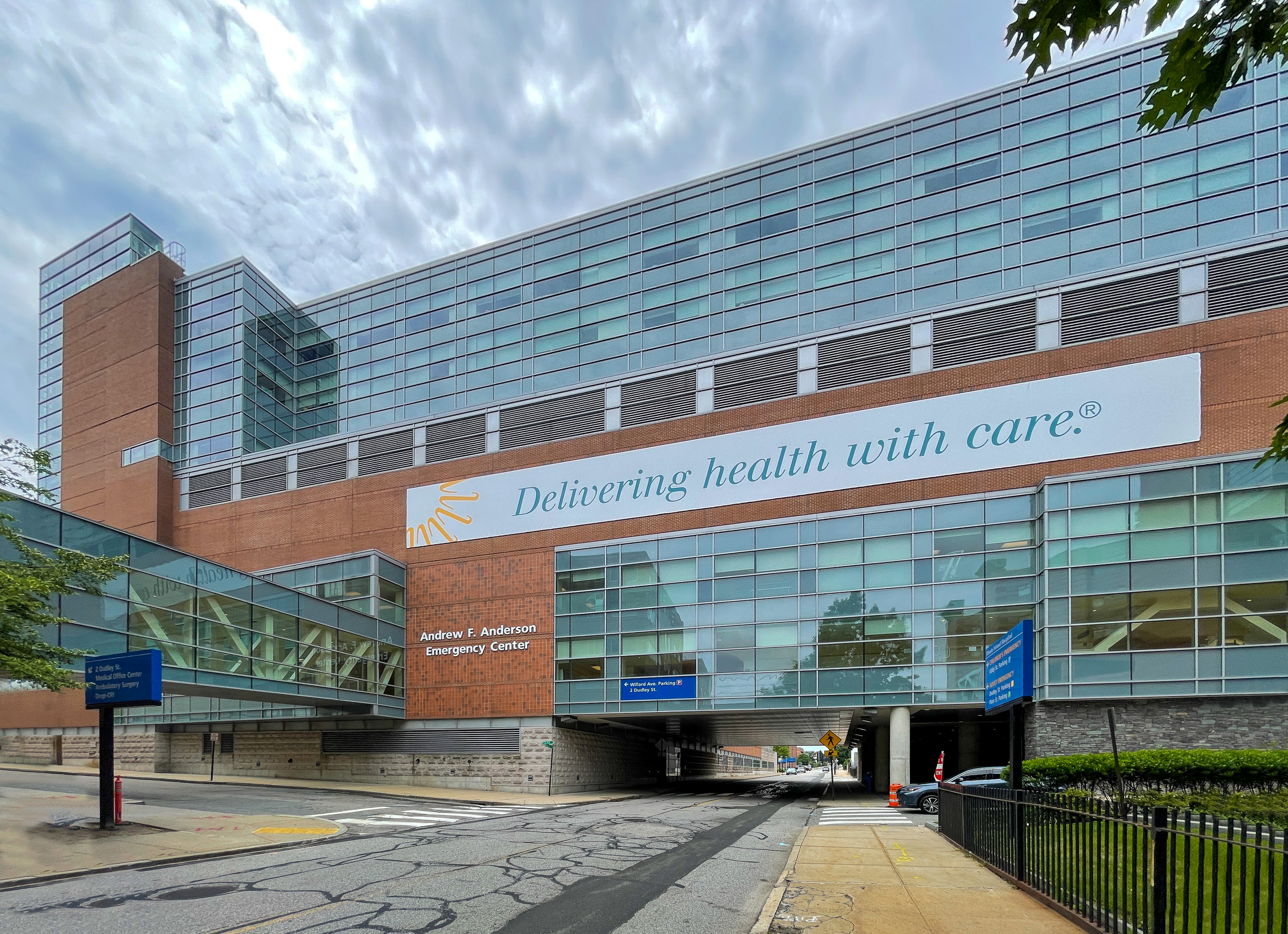
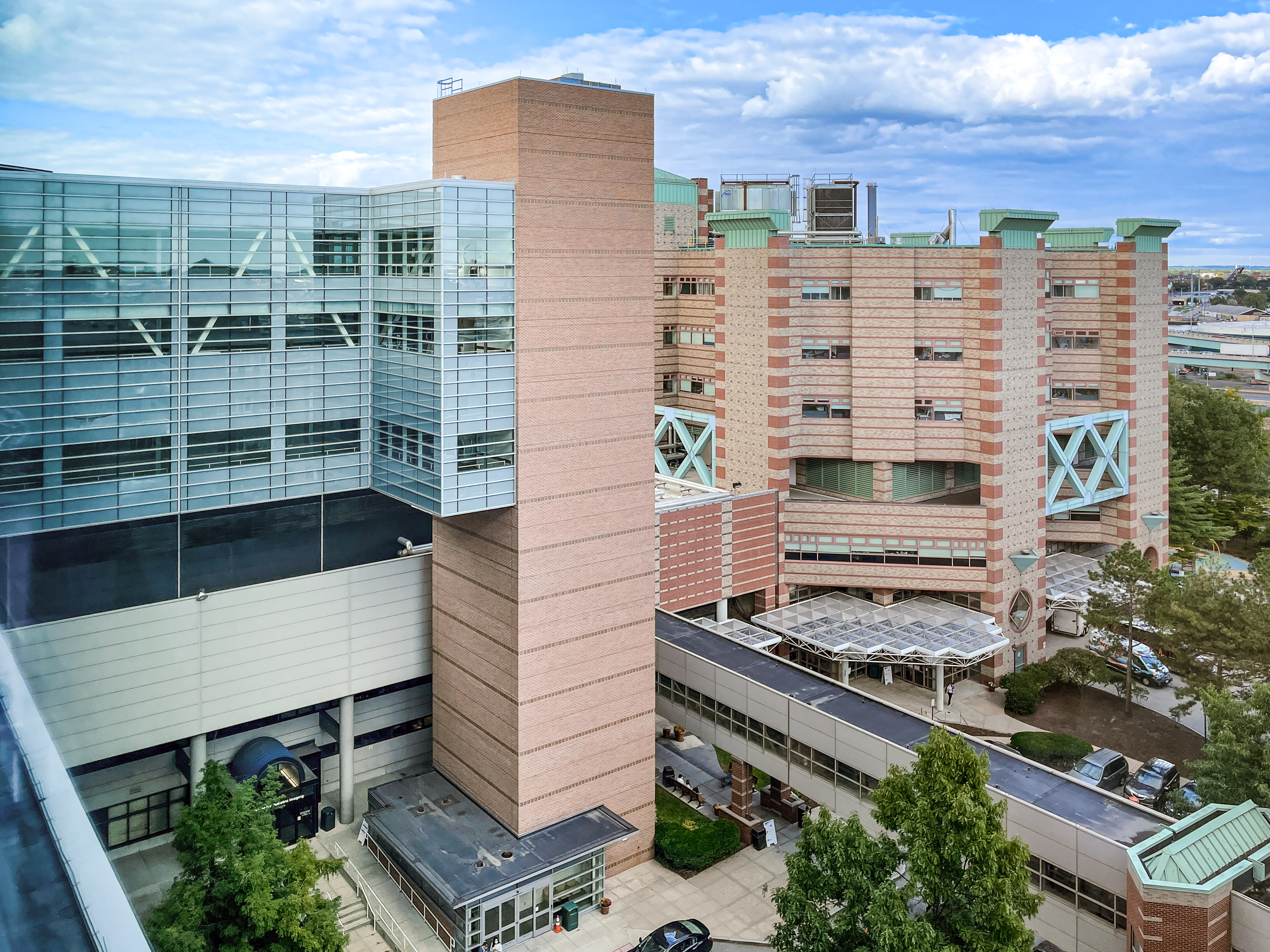
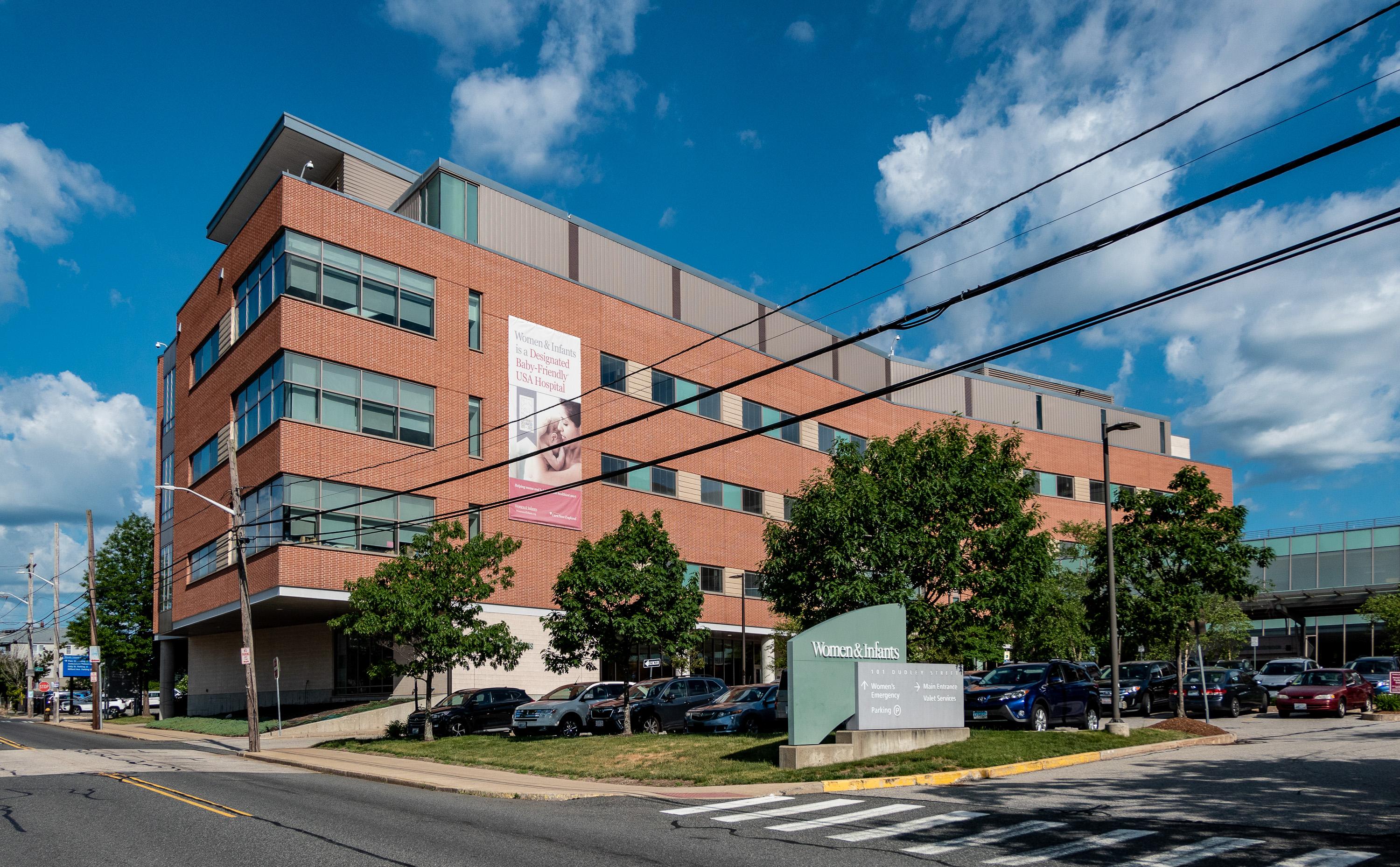
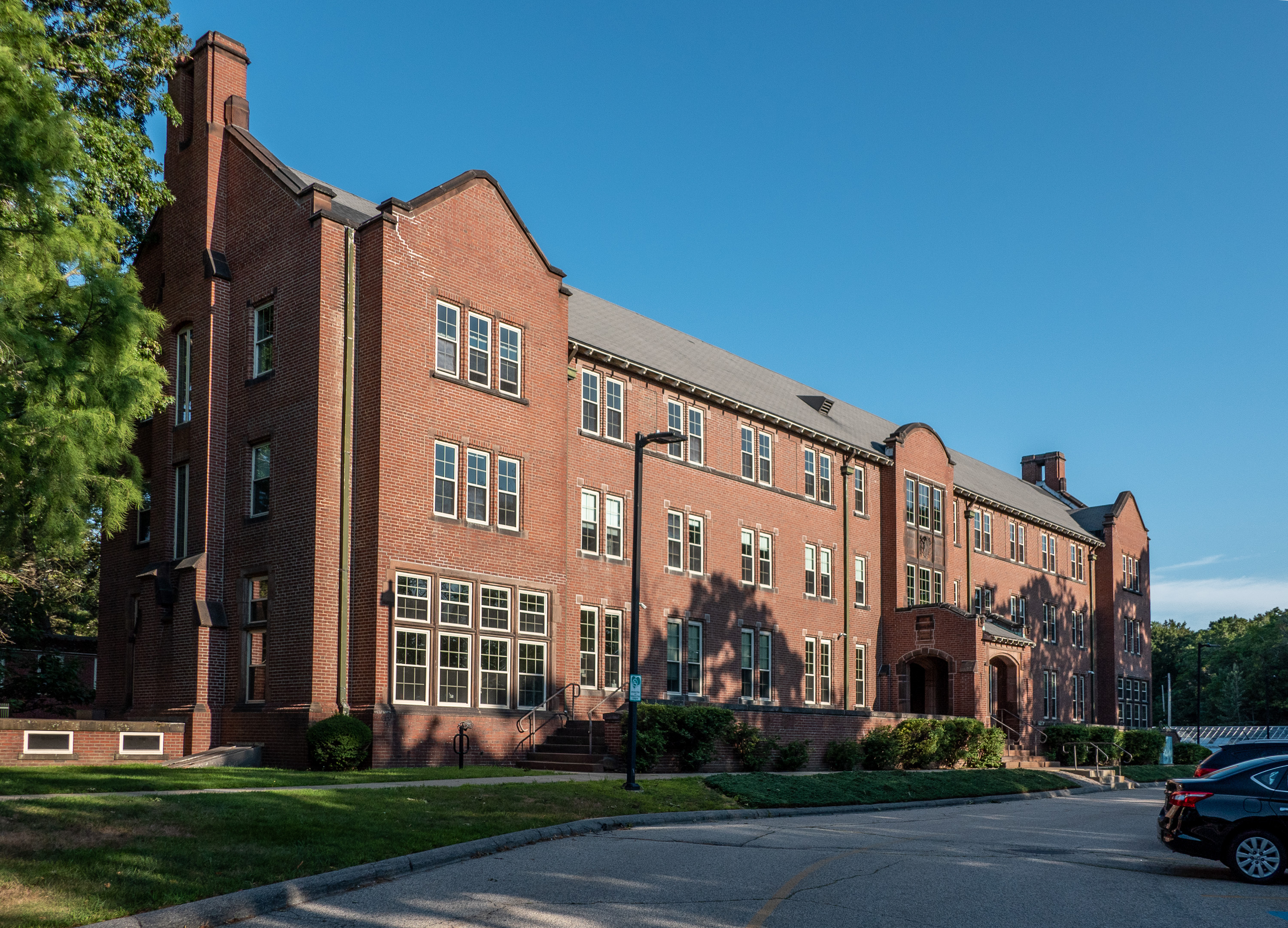
Rhode Island Hospital, Hasbro Children's Hospital, Women & Infants Hospital, Butler Hospital
- Rhode Island Hospital
  - Hasbro Children's Hospital
- The Miriam Hospital
- Kent Hospital
- Women & Infants Hospital of Rhode Island
- Providence VA Medical Center
- Butler Hospital
- Emma Pendelton Bradley Hospital
- Hope Hospice & Palliative Care of Rhode Island
