= College of Brown University =

Undergraduate school of Brown University

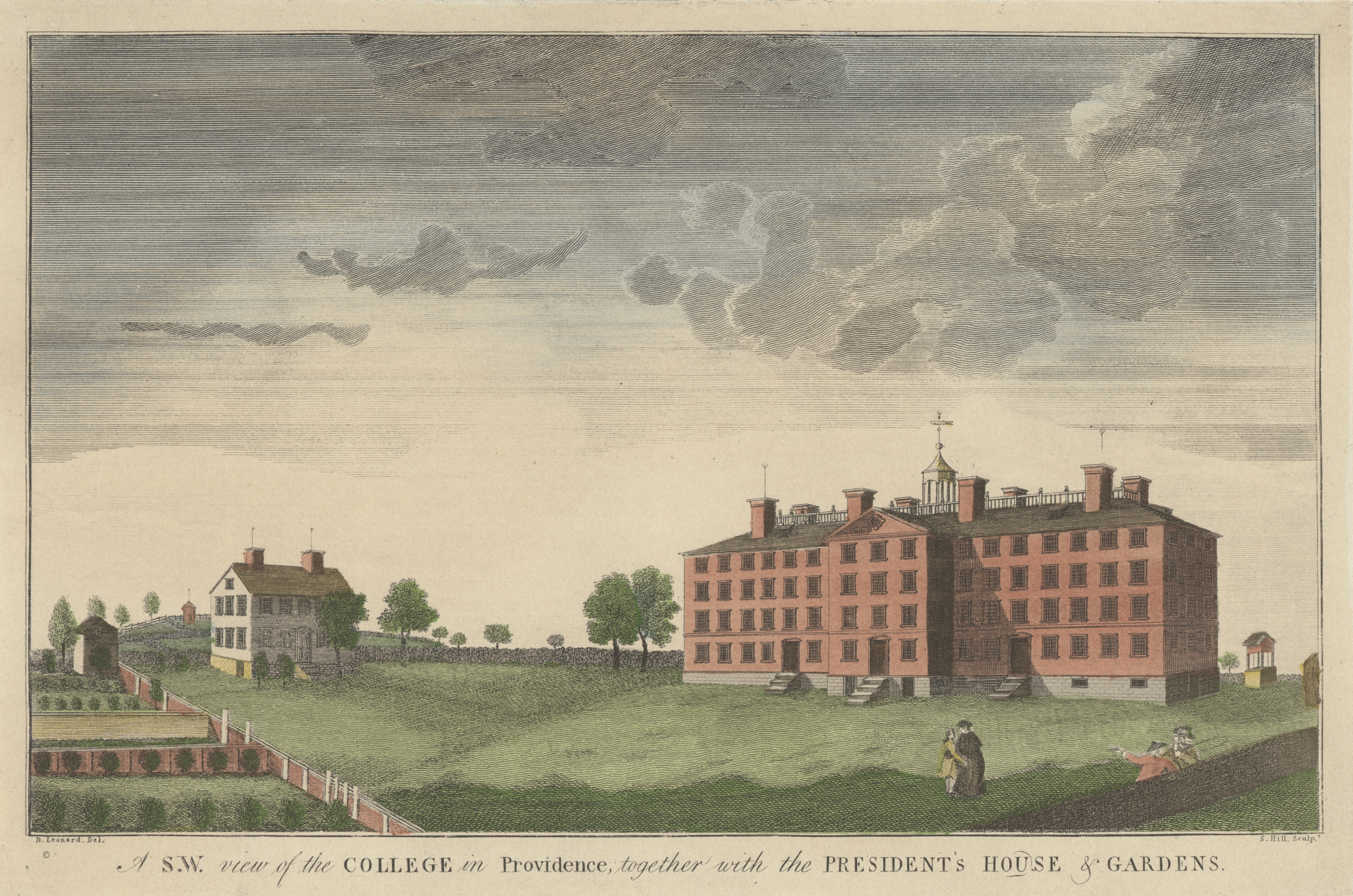
- This 1792 engraving is the first published image of Brown. University Hall stands on the right while the President's House sits on the left.
- Type: Private
- Established: 1764; 262 years ago
- Parent institution: Brown University
- Dean: Ethan Pollock
- Students: 7,043
- Location: Providence, Rhode Island, United States
- Campus: Urban
- Website: college.brown.edu

The College of Brown University is the undergraduate school of Brown University, in College Hill, Providence, Rhode Island. Founded in 1764, the college is the university's oldest school and the seventh-oldest institution of higher education in the United States.

Compared to its peers, the college is distinguished by its Open Curriculum; adopted in 1969, the Open Curriculum permits students to study without any course requirements outside of their chosen concentration (major).

Admissions is among the most selective in the United States, with an acceptance rate of 5.0% for fall 2022.

== History ==
On March 3, 1764, James Manning and Ezra Stiles filed a charter to create the College of Rhode Island. Their mission, as stated in the charter, was to prepare students "for discharging the Offices of Life" by providing instruction in the Vernacular Learned Languages, and in the liberal Arts and Sciences." Manning became the college's first president in 1765, and five years later the school moved to its present location on College Hill on the East Side of Providence.

In 1850, Brown President Francis Wayland wrote, "The various courses should be so arranged that, insofar as practicable, every student might study what he chose, all that he chose, and nothing but what he chose." However, the college did not make any major institutional changes for over a century. In 1969, the Open Curriculum was implemented, eliminating distribution requirements and allowing students to take any course Satisfactory/No Credit. In addition, the university eliminated pluses, minuses, and D grades in the letter grading system.

The current Dean of Brown's College is Rashid Zia, a class of 2001 Brown graduate. Previous deans have included Maud Mandel and Kenneth Sacks.

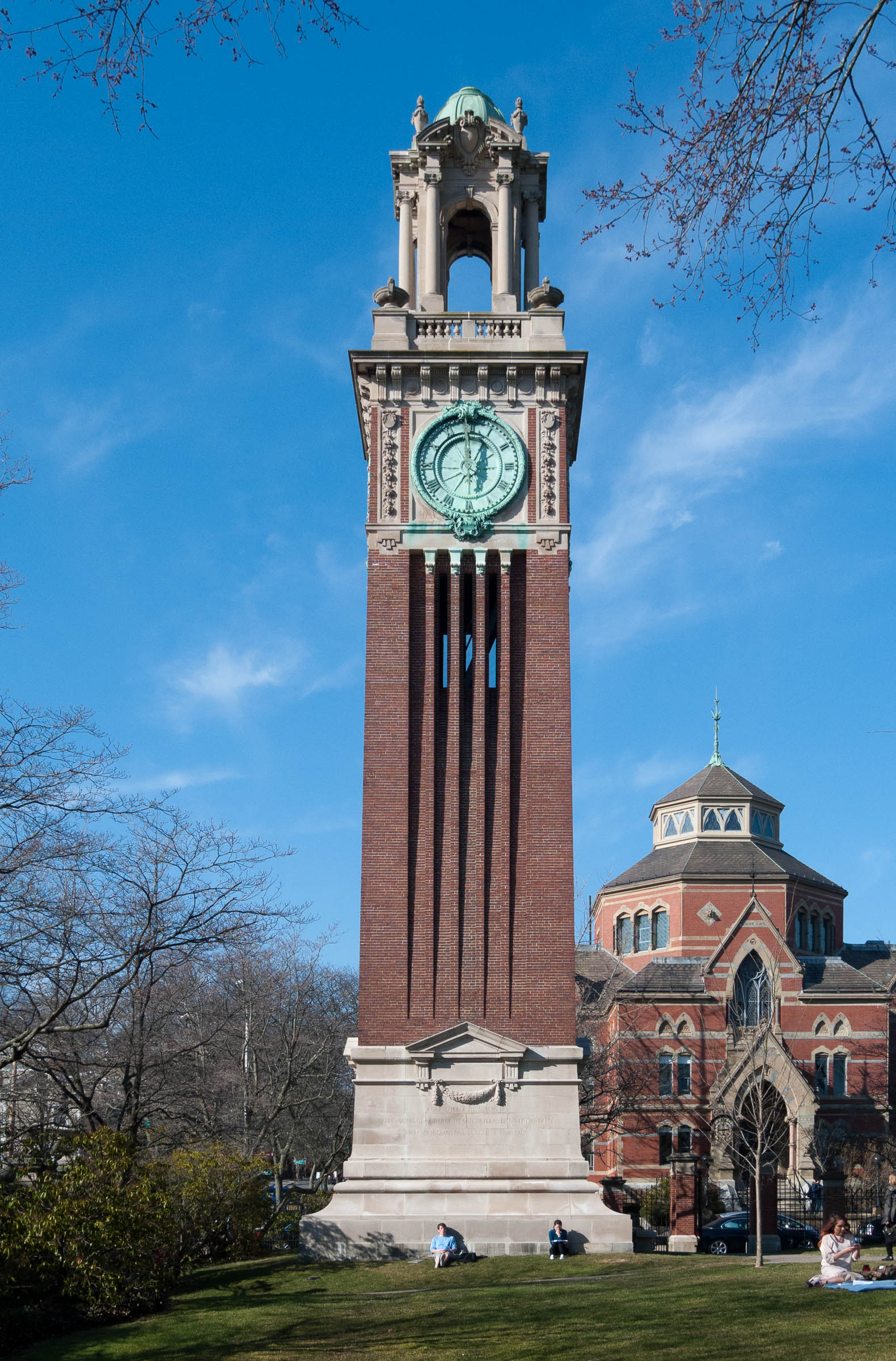
Carrie Tower (1904) and Robinson Hall (1878) on Brown's historic central campus

== Academics ==
=== Degrees granted ===
The college offers two different baccalaureate degrees: Bachelor of Arts (A.B.) and Bachelor of Science (Sc.B.)

=== Dual degree programs ===
In addition to traditional degree programs, Brown offers a number of dual degree programs.

==== A.B./Sc.B. ====
Students have the ability to graduate in five years with both an A.B. and Sc.B. degree, provided that requirements for each degree are met. This is distinct from a double concentration, when students only receive one degree.

==== PLME ====
The Program in Liberal Medical Education is a single eight-year program that allows students to complete both an undergraduate degree (A.B. or Sc.B.) from The college and subsequently an M.D. degree from Alpert Medical School. Admission to PLME is highly competitive; in 2015, 90 students were granted admission out of an applicant pool of 2,290.

==== Brown-RISD ====
While students at the college have long been able to cross-register for classes at the nearby Rhode Island School of Design, it is now possible to complete a degree from Brown and a B.F.A. from RISD concurrently over a five-year period. Students must be admitted to both institutions separately in order to matriculate.
