= Faunce =

Faunce is a surname. Notable people with the name include:

- Benjamin Faunce (1873–1949), American druggist and businessman
- Daniel Faunce (1829–1911), American minister and writer
- Ev Faunce (1926–2009), American football player and coach
- Jennifer Faunce (born 1965), American politician and judge
- Marcus de Laune Faunce (1922–2004), Australian physician
- Thomas Faunce (1958–2019), Australian bioethicist and researcher
- Thomas Faunce (cricketer) (1883–1968), Australian cricketer
- William Faunce (1859–1930), American clergyman and educator

== See also ==
- Faunt (surname)
