= Ezekiel Robinson =

American theologian (1815–1894)

The Reverend Ezekiel Robinson
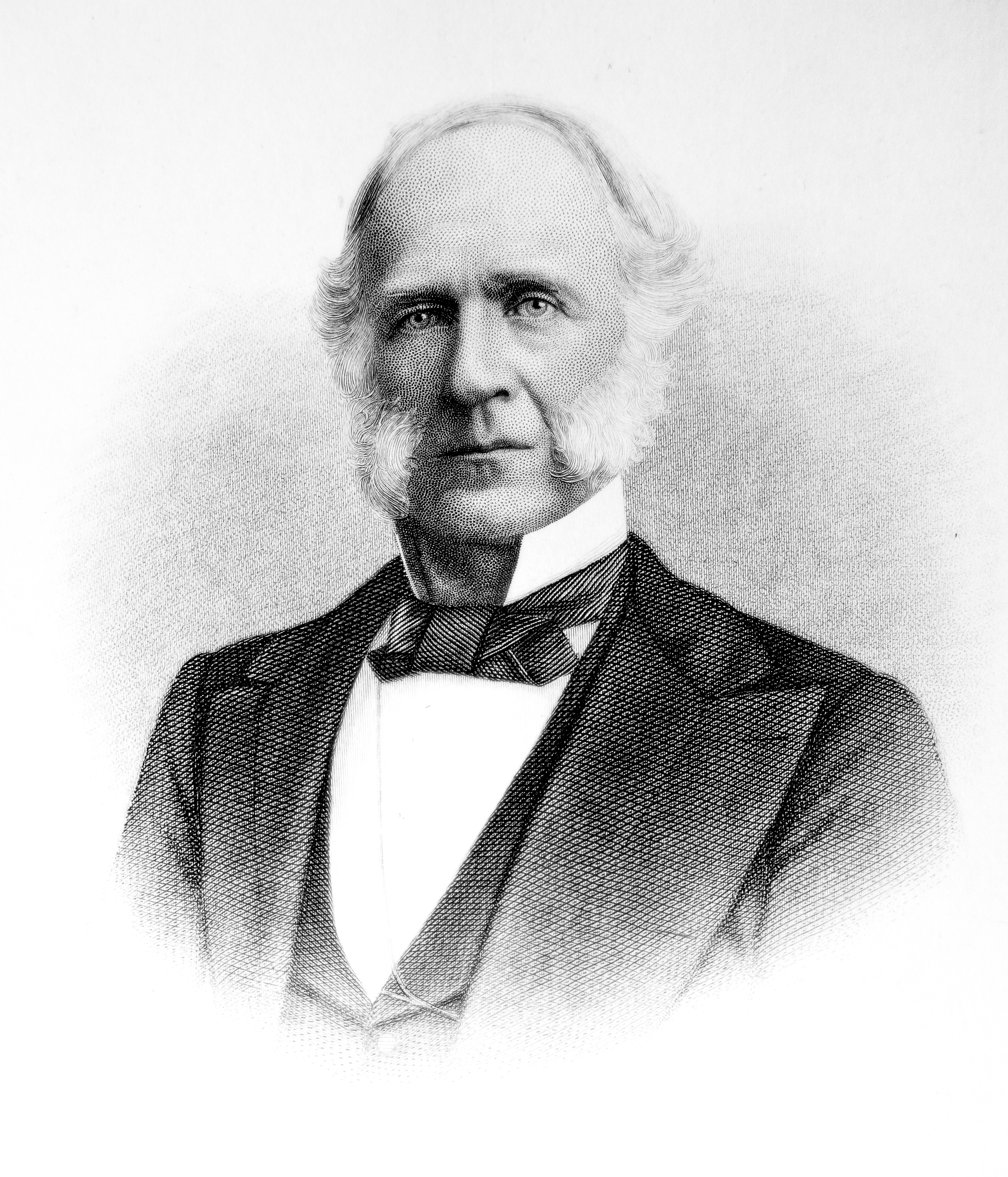

7th President of Brown University
- In office 1872–1889
- Preceded by: Alexis Caswell
- Succeeded by: Elisha Andrews

Personal details
- Born: March 23, 1815 Attleboro, Massachusetts, US
- Died: June 13, 1894 (aged 79) Boston, Massachusetts, US
- Resting place: Mount Hope Cemetery; Rochester, New York, US
- Spouse: Harriet Richards Parker
- Education: Brown University

Ezekiel Gilman Robinson (March 23, 1815 – June 13, 1894) was an American Baptist clergyman, theologian and educator, born at Attleboro, Massachusetts, and educated at Brown University and at Newton Theological Institution. He preached at Norfolk, Virginia, and at Cambridge, Massachusetts, was professor of Hebrew and biblical interpretation in the Western Theological Seminary (Covington, Kentucky), and in 1849 accepted a call to a church in Cincinnati, Ohio. Three years later he was appointed professor of theology in Rochester Theological Seminary and in 1868 was made its president. From 1872 to 1889 he was president of Brown University, and from 1893 to his death he occupied the chair of ethics and apologetics at the University of Chicago. He edited the Christian Review from 1859 to 1864.

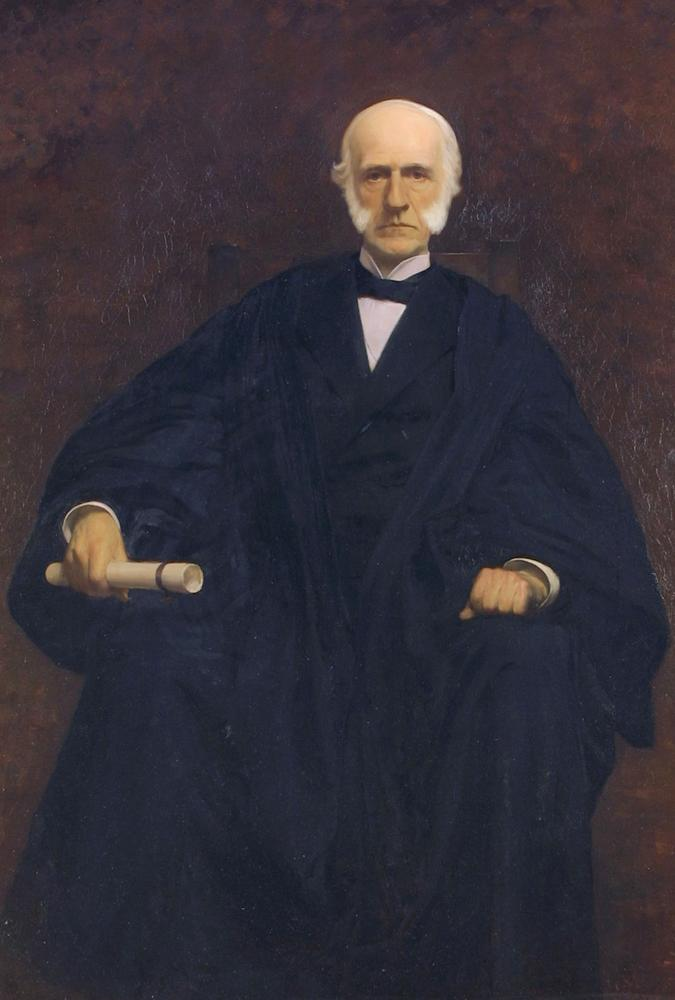
Ezekiel Robinson painted by Otto Grundmann

== Presidency of Brown ==
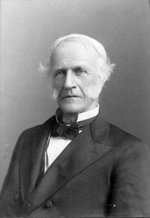

Some of the highlights of his presidency at Brown include:

- Held the Chair of Moral Philosophy and Metaphysics
- Erection of the Robinson Library (1878); Slater Hall; Sayles Hall; and an addition to Rhode Island Hall
- College funds were increased
- Delivered the baccalaureate sermons
- He delivered a series of lectures on the History of Intellectual Philosophy and Metaphysical Science in Manning Hall
- Preached in pulpits across Providence

== Selected works ==
- Robinson, Ezekiel G. (1869), Ritualism in the Church of England, Philadelphia: American Baptist Publication Society, OCLC 22999573
- Robinson, Ezekiel G. (1883), Lectures on Preaching, Delivered to the Students of Theology at Yale College, January and February, 1882, New York: Henry Holt and Company, OCLC 6272765
- Robinson, Ezekiel G. (1888), Principles and Practice of Morality; or, Ethical Principles Discussed and Applied, Boston: Silver, Burdett and Company, OCLC 3757662
- Robinson, Ezekiel G. (1894), Christian Theology, Rochester, New York: E.R. Andrews, OCLC 7476068
- Robinson, Ezekiel G. (1895), Christian Evidences, New York: Silver, Burdett and Company, OCLC 7902059
- Robinson, Ezekiel G.; Wayland, Herman L.; Johnson, Elias H. (1896), Johnson, Elias H. (ed.), Ezekiel Gilman Robinson; an Autobiography with a Supplement, New York: Silver, Burdett and Company, OCLC 2934923

== See also ==
- Anderson, Thomas D. (1894). "Ezekiel Gilman Robinson". Proceedings of the American Academy of Arts and Sciences. 30: 572–79. JSTOR 20020608.

Academic offices
| First | President of the Rochester Theological Seminary; 1868–1872 | Succeeded by Augustus H. Strong |
| Preceded by Alexis Caswell | President of Brown University; 1872–1889 | Succeeded by Elisha Andrews |
