= Henry Wriston =

American university president (1889–1978)

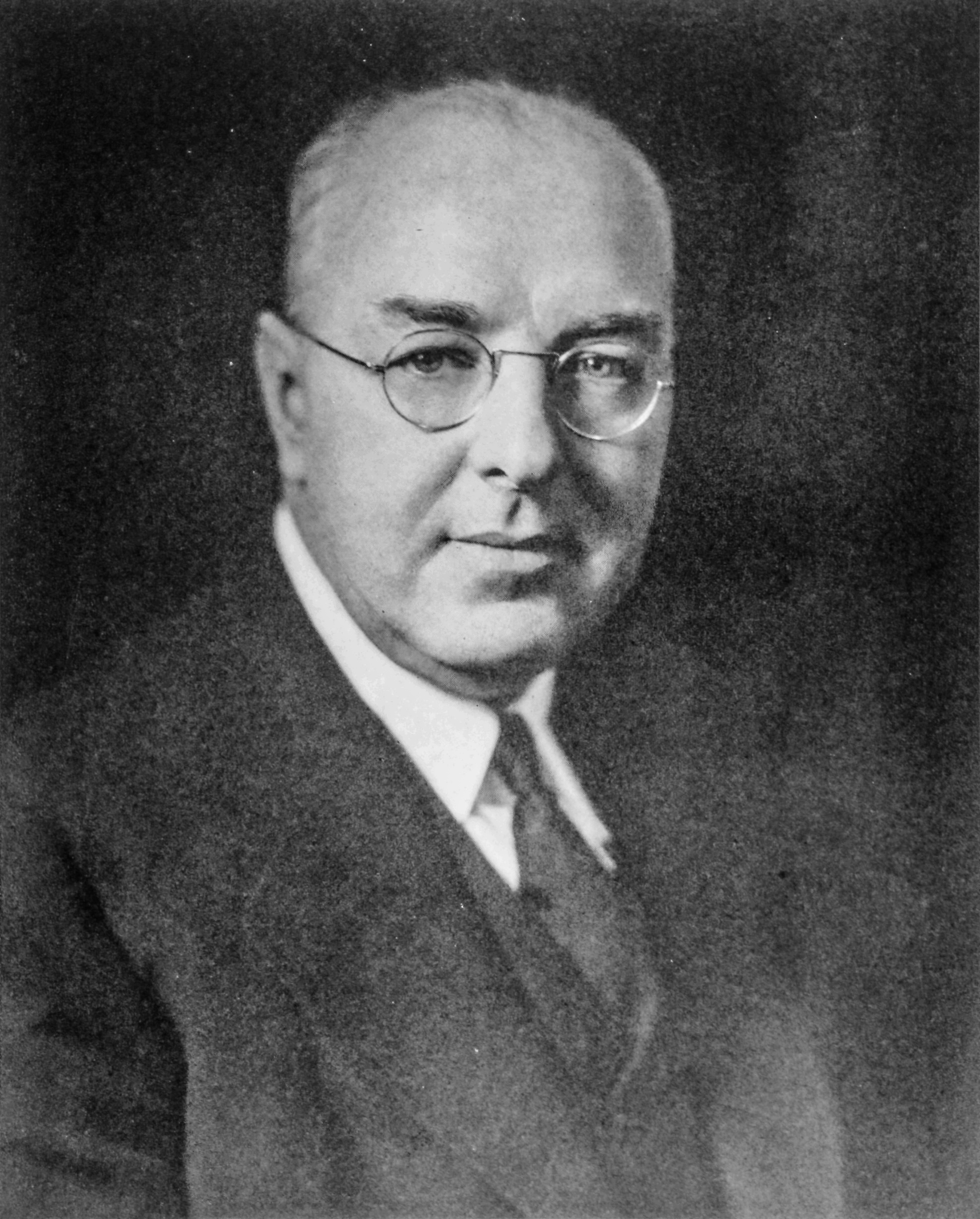

11th President of Brown University
- In office 1937–1955
- Preceded by: Clarence Barbour
- Succeeded by: Barnaby Keeney

Personal details
- Born: July 4, 1889 Laramie, Wyoming, United States
- Died: March 8, 1978 (aged 88) New York City, New York
- Resting place: Oak Grove Cemetery; Springfield, Massachusetts
- Education: Wesleyan University; Harvard University

Henry Merritt Wriston (July 4, 1889 – March 8, 1978) was an American educator, presidential advisor, and served as president at both Brown University and Lawrence University.

== Early life ==
Henry Merritt Wriston was born in Laramie, Wyoming, the son of a Methodist minister and a schoolteacher. He received his BA in 1911 from Wesleyan University and returned there for his MA, which he earned in 1912. While an undergraduate at Wesleyan, he edited the school newspaper, was a top debater, and won the senior oratorical contest.

He began graduate studies in history and international affairs at Harvard University as an Austin Teaching Fellow, and returned to Wesleyan in 1914 as a history instructor. During World War I, Wriston was the assistant manager of the Connecticut State Council of Defense, and given his success there, he was appointed to be the executive secretary of the Wesleyan Endowment Fund in 1919. In 1922, Wriston completed his dissertation and was awarded his PhD from Harvard, and was consequently awarded full professor status at Wesleyan.

== University president ==
Due in large part to his role with Wesleyan's Endowment Fund, the Lawrence College (now Lawrence University) Board of Trustees selected him to be their next president, replacing Samuel G. Plantz, who had died the year prior, and interim president Wilson Samuel. Wriston was the eighth president of Lawrence University, and held the position from 1925 to 1937. His term was marked by the improvement of the curriculum, faculty, and library collections, and the establishment of the Institute of Paper Chemistry (now the Institute of Paper Science and Technology). Before leaving the school, he wrote the book The Nature of a Liberal College.

He was president of Brown University between 1937 and 1955. Following a change in the university's charter, he was the first president who was not a Methodist minister in the 175 years of the college; he was also the first president since Francis Wayland who was not an alum.

== Later life ==
He served as president of the Council on Foreign Relations between 1951 and 1964. He also served as president of the American Assembly until 1963 and served on the board of trustees of the World Peace Foundation.

In 1961, President Dwight D. Eisenhower appointed Wriston to the Chairmanship of the President's Commission on National Goals. Wriston was also an adviser to President Eisenhower, a member of the United States State Department's Advisory Committee on Foreign Service, and chairman of the Historical Advisory Committee to the Chief of Military History for the United States Department of the Army.

He is the father of Walter Wriston, former chairman and CEO of Citibank. Wriston died on March 8, 1978, in New York City, aged 88.

== Works ==
- "Academic Procession." New York: New York University Press, 1959.
- "Challenge to Freedom," New York: Harper, 1943.
- "Character in Action." Providence: Brown University Press, 1941.
- "College Students and the War" Washington D.C.: The National Policy Committee, 1940.
- "Cuba and the United States: long range perspectives" Washington: Brookings Institution, 1967.
- "Diplomacy in a Democracy," New York: Harper, 1956.
- "Education for Democracy." Boston: American Unitarian Association, 1940.
- "Executive Agents in American foreign relations." Baltimore: The Johns Hopkins Press, 1929.
- "How to Achieve the Inevitable." Providence: Brown University Press, 1943.
- "The Nature of a Liberal College," Appleton, Wisconsin: Lawrence College Press, 1937.
- "Policy Perspectives," Providence: Brown University Press, 1964.
- "Prepare for Peace!" New York: Harper, 1941.
- "Strategy of Peace" Boston: World Peace Organization, 1944.
- "Voices of America" Stamford, Connecticut. Overbrook Press, 1953.
- "Washington's Foreign Policy as a Guide for Today." Middletown Connecticut: Press of Pelton & King, 1925.
- "Wriston speaking: A selection of addresses." Providence: Brown University Press, 1957.

Academic offices
Preceded by Samuel G. Plantz	President of Lawrence University; 1925–1937	Succeeded by Thomas Nichols Barrows
Preceded by Clarence Barbour	President of Brown University; 1937–1955	Succeeded by Barnaby Keeney
