= Alexis Caswell =

American educator (1799–1877)

The Reverend Alexis Caswell
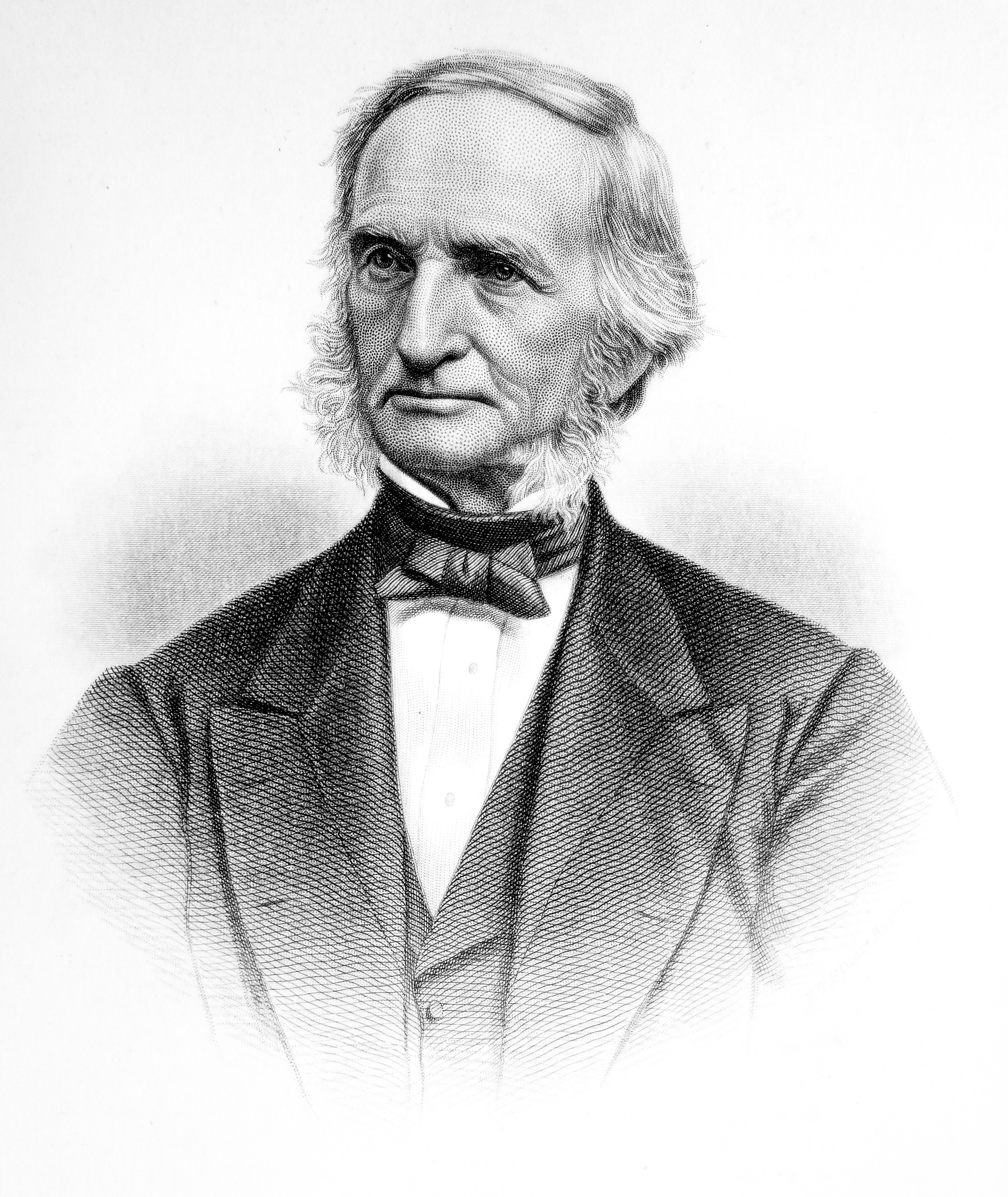
- Caswell in an 1881 illustration

6th President of Brown University
- In office 1868–1872
- Preceded by: Barnas Sears
- Succeeded by: Ezekiel Robinson

Personal details
- Born: January 29, 1799 Taunton, Massachusetts, U.S.
- Died: January 8, 1877 (aged 77) Providence, Rhode Island, U.S.
- Resting place: North Burial Ground, Providence, Rhode Island
- Education: Brown University
- Profession: Educator

Alexis Caswell (January 29, 1799 – January 8, 1877) was an American educator, born in Taunton, Massachusetts. He graduated Brown University in 1822, and entered the Baptist ministry.

== Career ==
Caswell was professor of mathematics and natural philosophy at Brown University from 1828 to 1850, and of mathematics and astronomy from 1850 to 1864. Professor Caswell was president of Brown University from 1868 to 1872. He was one of the founders of the American Association for the Advancement of Science and served as its President in 1857.

Besides several papers on meteorology in the Reports of the Smithsonian Institution, he wrote The Life of Francis Wayland, a Textbook on Astronomy, and a Memorial of John Barstow (1864).

== Family ==
Caswell was the son of Samuel (1760–1851) and Polly Foster Seaver Caswell (1768–1818). Through his father, he is a direct descendant of Peregrine White, the first baby boy born aboard the Mayflower while it was anchored at the Massachusetts harbor.

On May 17, 1830, Caswell married Esther Lois Thompson (September 1, 1802 – June 25, 1850) of Providence, the daughter of Edward Kinnicutt Thompson and his wife, Sarah Kuhn Swope/Swoope Thompson. She was a 3rd great-granddaughter of Roger Kinnicutt, who was born in England and emigrated to America around 1635. Her distant cousins include G. Hermann Kinnicutt and Chevy Chase.

They had at least six children:

1. Sarah Swope Caswell (1831–1903), who married James Burrill Angell
2. Mary Thompson Caswell (1832–1832)
3. Edward Thompson Caswell (1833–1887)
4. Alexis Caswell Jr. (1835–1837)
5. Joseph Thompson Caswell (1838–1838)
6. Joseph Thompson Caswell II (1840–1913)

After Esther's death, Caswell married Elizabeth Brown Edmands (1817–1880) in 1855.

His notable descendants include James Rowland Angell, Alexis C. Angell, Robert Cooley Angell, and Constance Green.

== Bibliography ==
- Joseph Lovering (1909). Biographical Memoir of Alexis Caswell, 1799-1877. National Academy of Sciences.
- Alexis Caswell (1860). Meteorological observations made at Providence, R. I. extending over a period of 28 1/2 years, from December 1831 to May 1860. Smithsonian Institution.
- Alexis Caswell (1860). Lectures on Astronomy. Smithsonian.
- Alexis Caswell (1864). A Brief Memoir of John Barstow, of Providence, R.I. Albany, NY: J. Munsell.
- "Alexis Caswell". Proceedings of the American Academy of Arts and Sciences. 12: 307–13. 1877. JSTOR 25138461.

Academic offices
| Preceded by Barnas Sears | President of Brown University; 1868–1872 | Succeeded by Ezekiel Robinson |
