= J. Y. Zhu =

Chinese-American engineer

Junyong Zhu is a Chinese American engineer and materials scientist. He is a senior scientist at the USDA Forest Products Laboratory in Madison, Wisconsin. He is a fellow of Technical Association of the Pulp and Paper Industry, American Institute of Chemical Engineers and the International Academy of Wood Science, and a member of the American Chemical Society and the American Association for the Advancement of Science. Zhu has received TAPPI's William H. Aiken Prize in 2014 and AIChE's Andrew Chase Award in 2016.

== Selected publications ==
- US9090915B2, Wang, Gaosheng; Pan, Xuejun & Zhu, Jun Yong et al., "Sulfite pretreatment for biorefining biomass", issued 2015-07-28
- Chen, Liheng; Wang, Qianqian; Hirth, Kolby; Baez, Carlos; Agarwal, Umesh P.; Zhu, J. Y. (June 2015). "Tailoring the yield and characteristics of wood cellulose nanocrystals (CNC) using concentrated acid hydrolysis". U.S. Patent No. 8, 710,213 (2014); Cellulose. 22 (3): 1753–1762. doi:10.1007/s10570-015-0615-1. ISSN 0969-0239.
- Chen, Liheng; Dou, Jinze; Ma, Qianli; Li, Ning; Wu, Ruchun; Bian, Huiyang; Yelle, Daniel J.; Vuorinen, Tapani; Fu, Shiyu; Pan, Xuejun; Zhu, Junyong (J.Y.) (September 2017). "Rapid and near-complete dissolution of wood lignin at ≤80°C by a recyclable acid hydrotrope". U.S. Patents No. 10,239,905; Science Advances. 3 (9). doi:10.1126/sciadv.1701735. ISSN 2375-2548. PMC 5600535. PMID 28929139.
- Cai, Cheng; Hirth, Kolby; Gleisner, Rolland; Lou, Hongming; Qiu, Xueqing; Zhu, J. Y. (2020). "Maleic acid as a dicarboxylic acid hydrotrope for sustainable fractionation of wood at atmospheric pressure and ≤100 °C: mode and utility of lignin esterification". U.S. Patent No. 11,479,914 (2022); Green Chemistry. 22 (5): 1605–1617. doi:10.1039/C9GC04267A. ISSN 1463-9262.
- Lou, Hongming; Zhu, J. Y.; Lan, Tian Qing; Lai, Huanran; Qiu, Xueqing (May 2013). "pH‐Induced Lignin Surface Modification to Reduce Nonspecific Cellulase Binding and Enhance Enzymatic Saccharification of Lignocelluloses". ChemSusChem. 6 (5): 919–927. doi:10.1002/cssc.201200859. ISSN 1864-5631.
- Lan, T. Q.; Lou, Hongming; Zhu, J. Y. (June 2013). "Enzymatic Saccharification of Lignocelluloses Should be Conducted at Elevated pH 5.2–6.2". BioEnergy Research. 6 (2): 476–485. doi:10.1007/s12155-012-9273-4. ISSN 1939-1234.
- Cai, Cheng; Li, Jian; Hirth, Kolby; Huber, George W.; Lou, Hongming; Zhu, J. Y. (2020-09-07). "Comparison of Two Acid Hydrotropes for Sustainable Fractionation of Birch Wood". ChemSusChem. 13 (17): 4649–4659. doi:10.1002/cssc.202001120. ISSN 1864-5631.
