= Institute of Paper Science and Technology =

Renewable Bioproducts Institute
- Established: 1929
- Director: Meisha Shofner; Interim Executive Director
- Academic staff: 63
- Postgraduates: 50
- Location: Atlanta, Georgia, USA
- Website: rbi.gatech.edu

The Renewable Bioproducts Institute (RBI) is a research institute at the Georgia Institute of Technology. Founded in 1929 as the Institute of Paper Chemistry in Appleton, Wisconsin, it moved to Georgia Tech's campus in 1989, and integrated its operations with the university on July 1, 2003, known then as the Institute of Paper Science and Technology (IPST). In 2014, the IPST became the Renewable Bioproducts Institute.

The organization is a link between Georgia Tech and the international paper industry; it focuses its research on pulp and paper processes, refining forest biomass into sustainable fuels, and creating new biomaterials in order to open new markets.

== History ==
Since the late 1800s, paper-making has been a vital industry in Wisconsin. Not formally trained in paper science, early workers in the industry generally relied on apprenticeship programs. In 1919, Samuel G. Plantz, the president of Lawrence College (now Lawrence University), worked with Monroe A. Wertheimer, president of the Thilmany Pulp and Paper Company (and a trustee of Lawrence College) to plan a night school for paper mill workers. Plantz envisioned workers from local paper mills teaching specialized classes, and a program that would include a partial liberal arts curriculum to create a "well-rounded individual".

There were delays in starting the school, primarily financial in nature; Plantz had estimated that it would require $200,000 to $250,000 to construct a building, purchase equipment, and hire professors. Plantz died in 1924; and his interim successor, Wilson Samuel, had a brief tenure. The next president of Lawrence College, Henry M. Wriston, pushed the idea forward; along with Ernst Mahler, who was then the vice president and general manager of the Kimberly-Clark Corporation in Neenah, Wisconsin. Mahler, then known for research in cellulose chemistry, had emigrated from Austria to work in the United States and establish one of the first research labs in the industry. He was able to acquire the financial support of 19 pulp and paper companies that encompassed 90 percent of the state's paper industry and in 1929 IPST was founded as the Institute of Paper Chemistry in Appleton, Wisconsin.

The school moved to a spot on Georgia Tech's northwest campus in 1989. On July 1, 2003, the IPST merged with Georgia Tech; and on September 1, 2003, the institute received a new director, William J. Frederick Jr., who received a corresponding faculty appointment in the School of Chemical and Biomolecular Engineering in the Georgia Tech College of Engineering. It was re-envisioned as a more direct link between the paper industry and Georgia Tech faculty and researchers.

== Works cited ==
- Wilhoit, Megan Murray (2013). Hopkins, Peter (ed.). From Appleton to Atlanta: The Institute's First 75 Years (PDF). Sarastoa, Florida: Sun Fung Museum Catalogs & Books. Archived from the original (PDF) on 2015-09-24.
