= Ernst Mahler =

Austrian chemist (1887–1967)

- Born: October 17, 1887
- Died: July 30, 1967 (aged 79)
- Education: Technische Hochschule de Darmstadt
- Scientific career
- Workplaces: Kimberly-Clark Corporation

Ernst Mahler (October 17, 1887 – July 30, 1967) was an Austrian chemist and leader of the Kimberly-Clark Corporation in Wisconsin. Mahler developed, refined, and commercialized various popular products and processes of papermaking. He was also instrumental in the foundation of the Institute of Paper Science and Technology (IPST) as well as the Technical Association of the Pulp and Paper Industry (TAPPI).

== Early life and education ==
Mahler was born in Vienna, Austria on October 17, 1887. He went to Darmstadt, Germany to attend Darmstadt University of Technology, and studied industrial chemistry, specializing in cellulose chemistry and the science of papermaking. He graduated with distinction in 1912.

Mahler came to the United States in 1912 and became a naturalized citizen in 1917. He took employment with Kimberly-Clark in Neenah, Wisconsin, and served as the papermaking company's head chemist. He married Carol Lyon of Minneapolis in August, 1918.

== Career ==
Mahler spearheaded research and development at his company, and perfected numerous innovative chemical processes. His development of creped wadding, a soft and fluffy absorbent material, became over time one of Kimberley-Clark's most important products and the source of billions of dollars in global sales. During World War I, creped wadding made from paper had been developed as a cotton substitute for surgical dressings; under Mahler's commercialization process, it became the basis of such well-known products as Kleenex and Kotex.

Mahler rose through the corporate hierarchy from chemist to Executive Vice President in 1937. He led Kimberly-Clark until his retirement in 1952.

The US Army Service Forces appointed Mahler to their purchase policy division during World War II. After the war, he spent further time as a consultant for the reconstitution of papermaking industries in Belgium, Holland, France and Germany. For these services, Mahler was awarded the US Army Medal of Freedom in 1946.

Mahler served on the board of directors of the Neenah West National Bank, and was an active town resident and civic leader. Prior to his death, he and his wife arranged to donate over 26 acres of their private property to the municipality for community recreational purposes. Mahler Park remains in steady use as a popular public park to the present day.

Mahler died on July 30, 1967, and was buried in an Episcopal service at Oak Hill Cemetery in Neenah.

== Awards and memberships ==
Mahler was widely recognized for his contributions to paper technology and business. He had been a founding member of the international Technical Association of the Pulp and Paper Industry (TAPPI, est. 1915) and the Institute of Paper Chemistry (now IPST, est. 1929). TAPPI bestowed its gold award for industry contributions in 1932, and IPST appointed him as an honorary chairman.

His alma mater Darmstadt augmented his 1912 degree with an honorary doctorate of engineering in 1958. Honorary degrees were also bestowed to him by Lawrence University and Brown University. In 1996, Mahler was named posthumously to the Paper Industry International Hall of Fame.

In 1954 Mahler was elected chairman of the committee to organize what eventually became the Bergstrom-Mahler Museum of Glass, whose present collection numbers over 3,500 objects and hosts over 20,000 visitors while being revered in glass collecting communities worldwide.
