= 1830 Rhode Island gubernatorial election =

- April 21, 1830
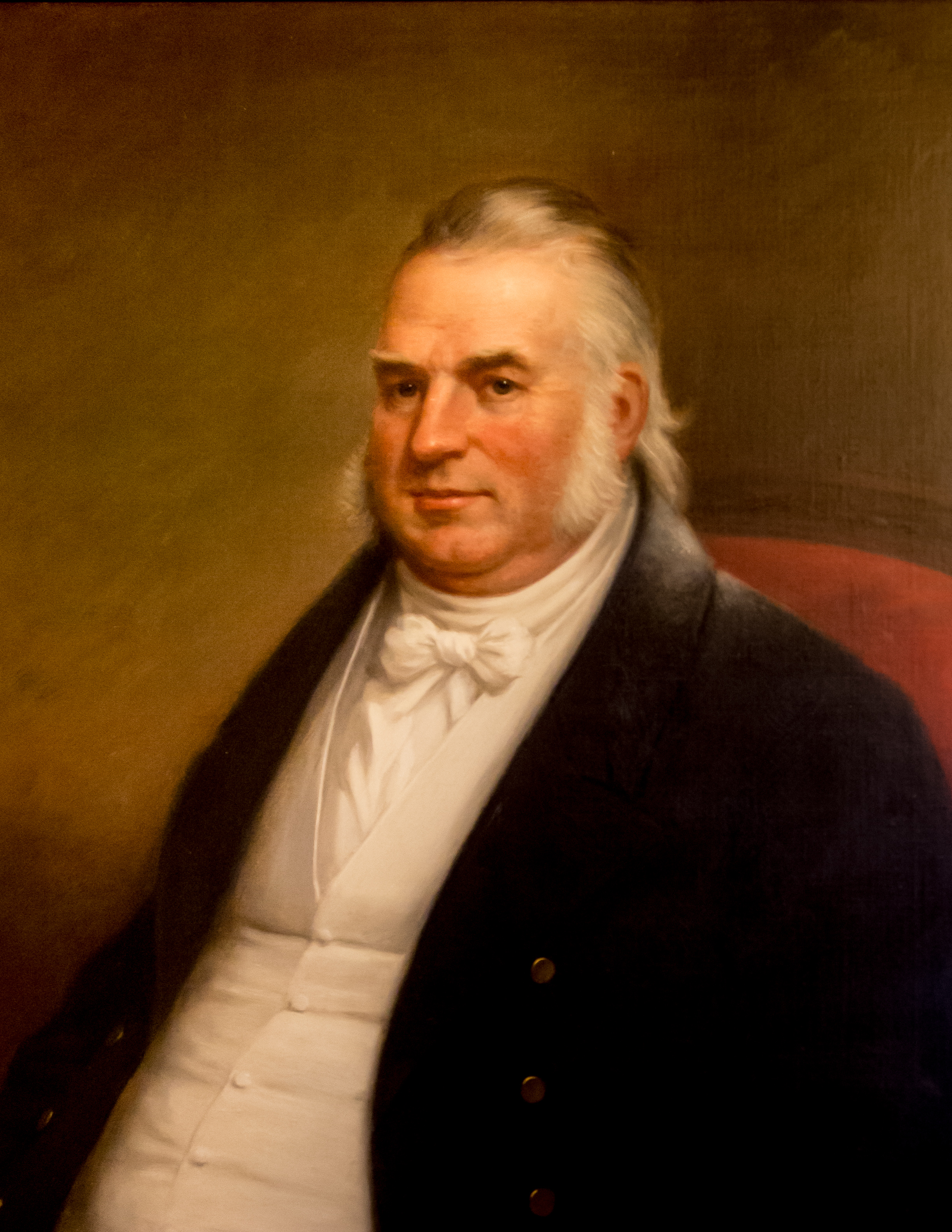

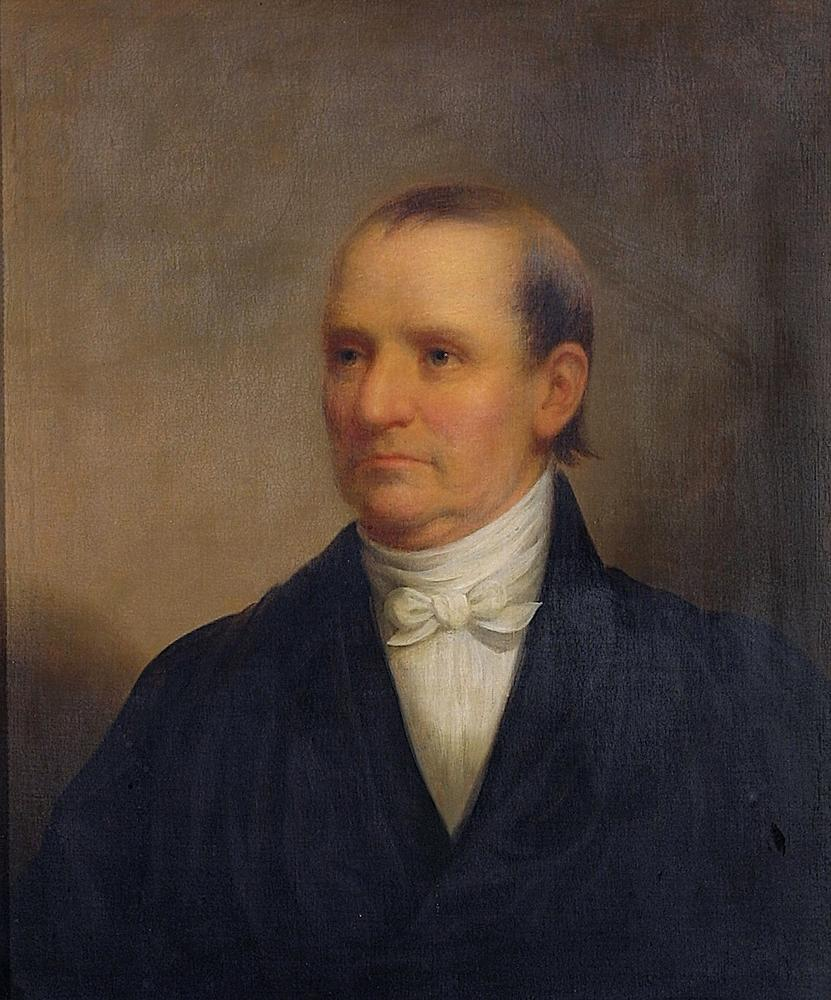
Nominee	James Fenner	Asa Messer
Party	Jacksonian	Independent
Popular vote	2,793	1,455
Percentage	61.87%	32.23%
- County results Fenner: 50–60% 60–70% 80–90%
Governor before election
James Fenner
Jacksonian
Elected Governor
James Fenner
Jacksonian

The 1830 Rhode Island gubernatorial election was an election held on April 21, 1830, to elect the governor of Rhode Island. James Fenner, the incumbent governor and Jacksonian Party nominee, beat independent candidate Asa Messer with 61.87% of the vote.

== General election ==
=== Candidates ===
- James Fenner, Governor since 1824.
- Asa Messer, President of Brown University from 1804 to 1826.

=== Results ===
1830 Rhode Island gubernatorial election
Party	Candidate	Votes	%	±%
Jacksonian	James Fenner (incumbent)	2,793	61.87%	
Independent	Asa Messer	1,455	32.23%	
Independent	Write-in candidates	266	5.89%	
Majority		1,338	29.64%	
Jacksonian hold		Swing		
