= Barnas Sears =

American educator and theologian (1802–1880)

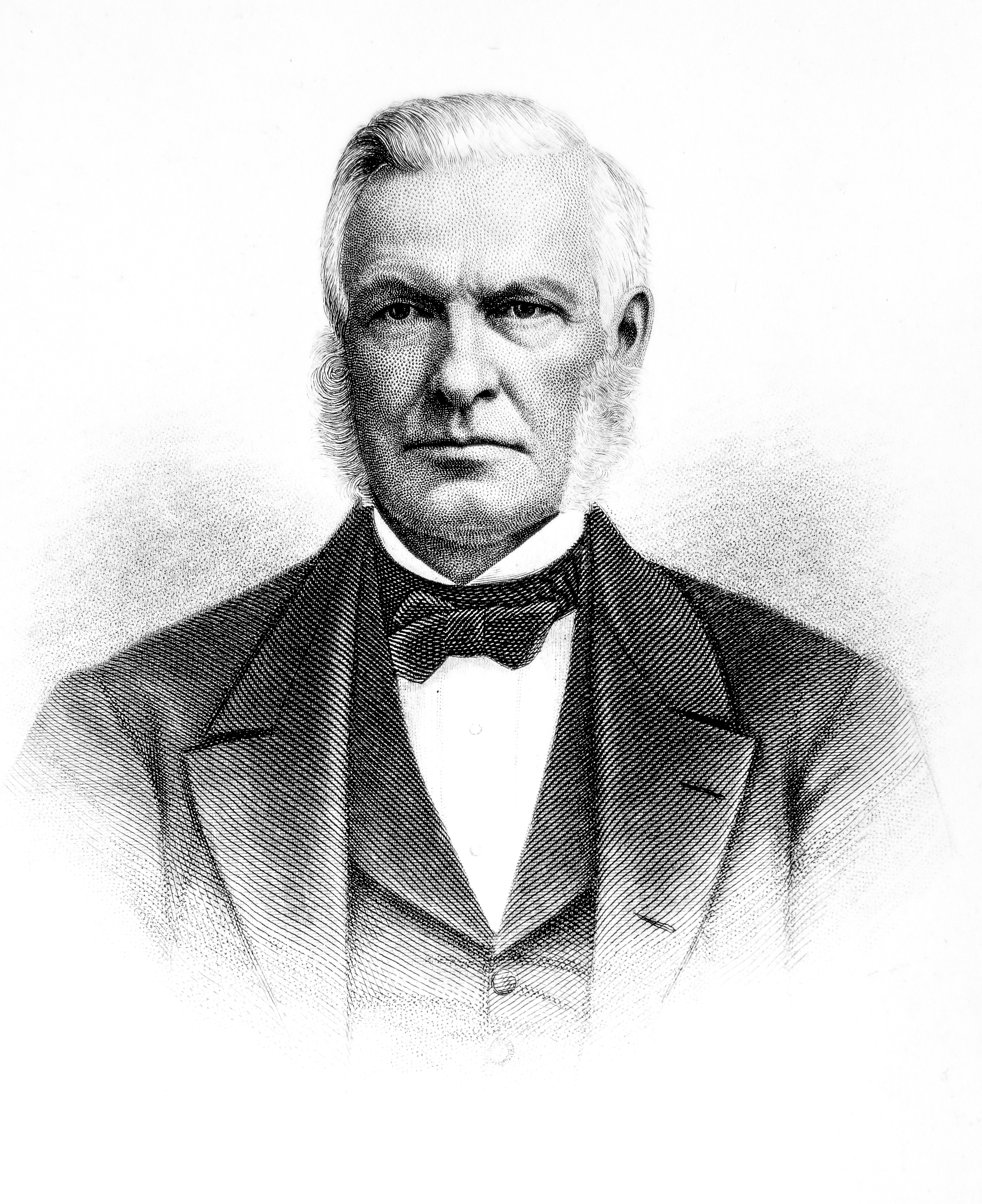
- 1881 engraving

5th President of Brown University
- In office 1855–1867
- Preceded by: Francis Wayland
- Succeeded by: Alexis Caswell

Personal details
- Born: November 19, 1802 Sandisfield, Massachusetts, US
- Died: July 6, 1880 (aged 77) Saratoga, New York, US
- Resting place: Walnut Street Cemetery; Brookline, Massachusetts, US
- Education: Brown University

Barnas Sears (November 19, 1802 – July 6, 1880) was an American educational theorist and Baptist theologian.

== Biography ==
Sears graduated from Brown University in 1825 and from Newton Theological Institution in 1827. For a short time, he served as pastor of First Baptist Church in Hartford, Connecticut. In 1833, Sears, then a professor in ancient languages at what is today Colgate University, visited Germany for studies. Having heard the story of Johann Gerhard Oncken, a German preacher who had recently become a Baptist and desired to be baptized in the faith, Sears made it a point to find and speak to him. By 1834, Oncken had made a final decision. Sears traveled from Halle, where he was studying at the University of Halle, to Hamburg, and baptized Oncken, Oncken's wife and five others in the Elbe on April 22. The baptism was performed at night. The next day, Sears established the first German Baptist church in Hamburg, which would become the core of most of the continental Baptist movement with Oncken as one of its leaders. During his studies in Germany, Sears came to know and was most influenced by theologians August Neander, Wilhelm Gesenius, and August Tholuck.

In 1835, Sears began working at Newton Theological Institution, both as chair of Christian theology and as president. In 1848, he became the secretary of the Massachusetts Board of Education. From 1849 to 1855, he also served as state librarian as part of his role as secretary of the board of education.

In 1866, he was elected to the American Academy of Arts and Sciences.

Sears was the general agent of the Peabody Education Fund who was sent to Staunton, Virginia, by George Peabody to offer leadership in public education. Sears was general agent of the fund from 1867 until February 1880 and was succeeded by Jabez Lamar Monroe Curry. He settled in Staunton because of the easy access to the railroad.

Sears travelled extensively throughout the south promoting Southern education, "free schools for the whole people". Sears "inspired confidence, removed doubts and suspicions, and aroused sympathy" through his warm personality, tact, and intelligence.

"Under his direction the Fund improved the sentiment for education in the South, developed the idea of adequate taxation for public schools, and helped remove the hostility toward Black education."

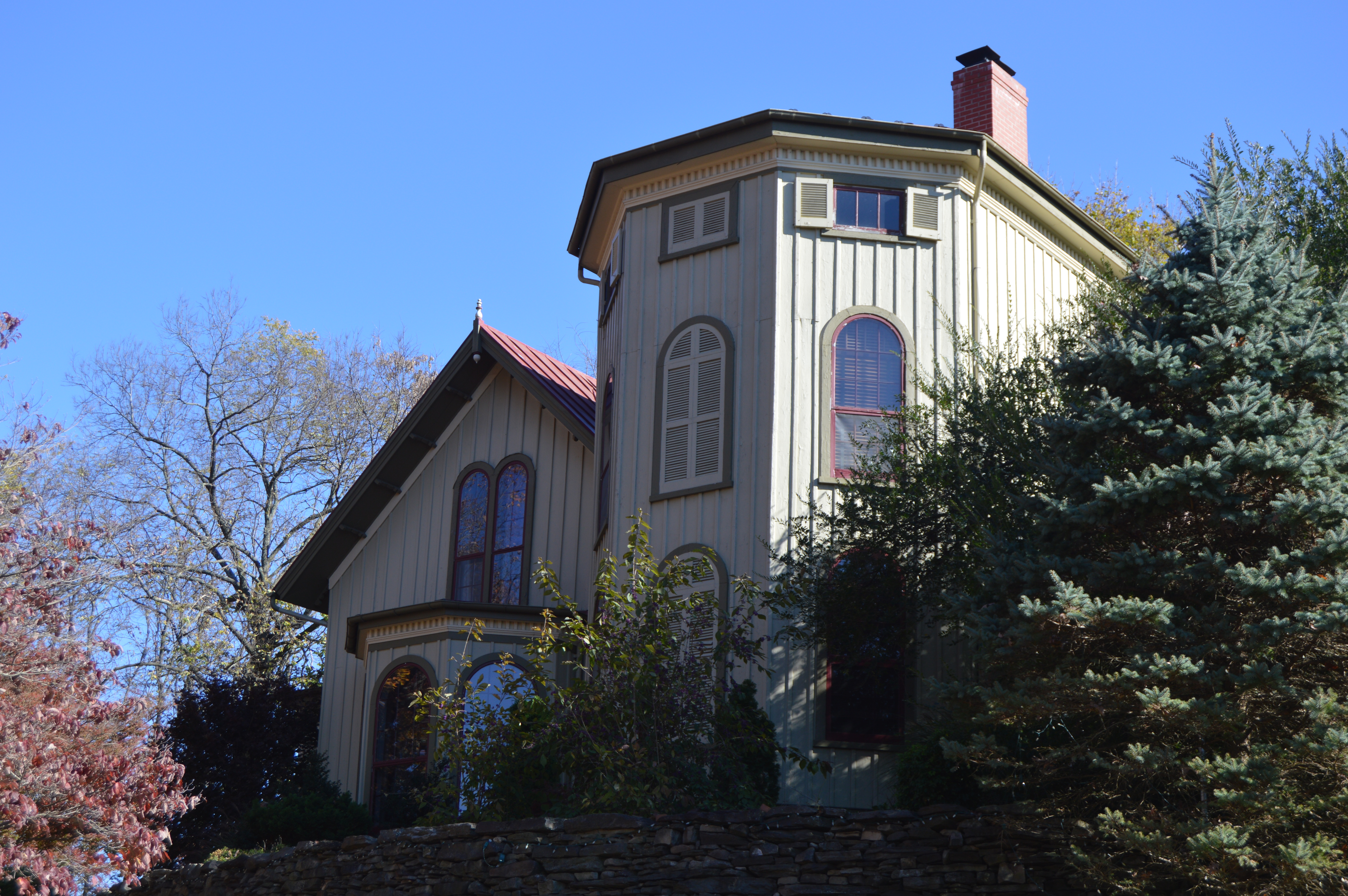
Sears' house in Staunton

Sears served between 1855 and 1867 as the president of Brown whose Encyclopedia Brunoniana offers a more detailed biography.

From 1874 to 1877, Sears also served as president of the American Baptist Missionary Union, and in this capacity he primarily supported church planting among German and European Baptists.

He died in Saratoga, New York, on July 6, 1880, and was buried in Brookline, Massachusetts.

His home at Staunton, known as the Sears House, was added to the National Register of Historic Places in 1972.

== Bibliography ==
- Martin Luther (1846). Barnas Sears (ed.). Select Treatises of Martin Luther in the Original German: With Philological Notes, and an Essay on German and English Etymology. Andover: Allen, Morrill and Wardwell.
- Barnas Sears; Bela Bates Edwards; Cornelius Conway Felton (1849). Classical Studies: Essays on Ancient Literature and Art, with the Biography and Correspondence of Eminent Philologists. Boston: Gould, Kendall and Lincoln.
  - "Reviewed Work: Classical Studies; Essays on Ancient Literature and Art". The North American Review. 57 (120): 184–95. 1843. JSTOR 25099655.
- Barnas Sears (1849). The Life of Luther: With Special Reference to Its Earlier Periods and the Opening Scenes of the Reformation. Philadelphia: American Sunday School Union.
- Barnas Sears (1799). Luther: his mental and spiritual history; with special reference to its earlier periods and the opening scenes of the Reformation. London: Religious Tract Society.
- The Catalogue of Brown University. Providence: Knowles, Anthony & Co. 1858.
- Peter Mark Roget (1859). Barnas Sears (ed.). Thesaurus of English Words and Phrases. Boston: Gould and Lincoln.
- Barnas Sears (1875). Objections To Public Schools Considered. Boston: John Wilson & Son. ISBN 9781418193607.

Academic offices
Preceded by Francis Wayland	President of Brown University; 1855–1867	Succeeded by Alexis Caswell
