= Commission on National Goals =

The U.S. President's Commission on National Goals was organized in February 1960 as a non-official body whose purpose was to develop a broad outline of national objectives and programs for the next decade and longer.

== Composition ==
The commission operated under the auspices of the American Assembly (established by Dwight D. Eisenhower at Columbia University in 1950 as a non-partisan educational organization) and was financed by private sources through the Assembly. The Commission was headed by Dr. Henry Wriston, who was appointed by President Eisenhower on February 3, 1960. The other members of the Commission were Vice Chairman Frank Pace, Erwin D. Canham, James B. Conant, Colgate W. Darden, Jr., Crawford H. Greenewalt, Alfred M. Gruenther, Learned Hand, Clark Kerr, James R. Killian, Jr., William P. Bundy and George Meany.

== Activities ==
Of the numerous topics first visualized, fifteen were defined in the final report of the Commission. A writer was selected for each topic (i.e., goal) and was assisted by an ad hoc panel selected to counsel and criticize. And, as a general rule, one or more members of the Commission participated with each ad hoc panel. The Commission commented upon, approved or disapproved, the papers being written on the chosen topics.

The completed report of the Commission (respecting President Eisenhower's request that its efforts be non-partisan) was sent to the president on November 16, 1960. The Report was published by Prentice Hall on December 12, 1960 in both paperback and hardbound editions.

== Dissolution ==
The Commission ceased activity with the submission of its report to the president, but its offices remained open until approximately May 1961, so as to make further arrangements for publicizing the Commission's report through the use of the communications media and the establishment of numerous discussion groups. The Commission also heavily influenced political elections because of the private funds flowing through the organization.
