= Howard Swearer =

15th President of Brown University
- In office 1977–1988
- Preceded by: Donald Hornig
- Succeeded by: Vartan Gregorian

6th President of Carleton College
- In office 1970–1977
- Preceded by: John Nason
- Succeeded by: Robert H. Edwards

Personal details
- Born: March 13, 1932 Hutchinson, Kansas, U.S.
- Died: October 19, 1991 (aged 59) Thompson, Connecticut, U.S.
- Education: Princeton University; Harvard University

Howard Robert Swearer (March 13, 1932 – October 19, 1991) was an American educator. He served as the sixth president of Carleton College, serving from 1970 to 1977, and the 15th president of Brown University between 1977 and 1988. His death from cancer shocked and saddened the Brown community, as few had known of his illness.

== Early life and education ==
Swearer was born on March 13, 1932, in Hutchinson, Kansas. His undergraduate work was at Princeton University, graduating in 1954. He earned a master's and a Ph.D. in political science from Harvard University, in 1956 and 1960, respectively. After receiving his doctorate, he became a political science professor at UCLA, teaching there from 1960 to 1967. He left UCLA to work for Ford Foundation from 1967 to 1970, working in their International Division.

== Carleton College ==
Swearer served as Carleton's president from 1970 to 1977. Carleton's new Music and Drama Center, which had been in the planning stages since 1960, was finally dedicated during his administration, as was the new Seely G. Mudd Hall of Science. He also oversaw a successful capital campaign during this period.

It was during the Swearer administration that Carleton's Winter Break was extended from four to six weeks by moving the start date of fall term two weeks earlier. Due to the high fuel prices in 1974 with the OPEC embargo, Swearer and the college's treasurer suggested the change might save fuel (not only would the college be largely unoccupied for a longer period during the colder months of November and December, but students who wished to visit home for Thanksgiving would not need to return to campus immediately afterward and then head home again a week or two later). Though students were at the time opposed to the change, their objections were overruled and it was put into effect for the 1974-1975 school year. A poll taken in 1975 found a high level of support for the change, and Carleton has had a six-week winter break ever since.

== Brown University ==
President Swearer left Carleton in 1977 to become president of Brown University, where he served until December 1988. During his tenure there, he led another successful capital campaign that increased several research grants and allowed for several deferred building projects to go forward. In 1985, Swearer helped found Campus Compact, a national non-profit dedicated to the civic purpose of higher education and the development of future democratic leaders. Swearer believed universities should be communities of compassionate people involved in serious intellectual pursuits, but never divorced from the realities of their communities. In 1987, he formed what is now known as the Howard R. Swearer Center for Public Service at Brown.

== Retirement ==
Following his term as Brown's president, he was appointed as the director of Brown's Institute for International Studies. He later moved to Thompson, Connecticut, where he died of cancer on October 19, 1991. Swearer's wife Janet died in 2020.

== Trivia ==
- President Swearer's son, Nick, built Iggy, a 40-foot (12 m) long iron sculpture of an iguana that stands in front of the Science Museum of Minnesota, when he was a high school student in Northfield. At one point during construction, Iggy was stolen from the Swearers' driveway and placed on a bridge on campus.

Academic offices
Preceded by Donald Hornig	President of Brown University; 1977-1988	Succeeded by Vartan Gregorian
