= Barnaby Keeney =

American academic administrator

12th President of Brown University
- In office 1955–1966
- Preceded by: Henry Wriston
- Succeeded by: Ray Heffner

Chair of the National Endowment for the Humanities
- In office July 1966 – June 1970
- President: Lyndon B. Johnson; Richard Nixon
- Preceded by: Office established
- Succeeded by: Ronald Berman

Personal details
- Born: October 17, 1914 Halfway, Oregon, U.S.
- Died: June 18, 1980 (aged 65) Providence, Rhode Island
- Resting place: Swan Point Cemetery; Providence, Rhode Island
- Spouse: Mary Elizabeth Critchfield
- Education: University of North Carolina; Harvard University

Barnaby Conrad Keeney (October 17, 1914 – June 18, 1980) was president of Brown University from 1955 to 1966. He was known and loved by the student body for openness and his dry wit. As he once observed, "One of the joys of the life of an educator, particularly a president, is the amount of free advice he gets." Keeney then served as president of Claremont Graduate University from 1971 to 1976.

== Personal life ==
Keeney was born in Halfway, Oregon on October 17, 1914. He grew up in Hartford, Connecticut where he was a high school track star. He was Greater Hartford champion in the 440‑yard dash in 1931 and he won the state championship in that event in 1932. He graduated from the University of North Carolina first in his class in 1936. He later took a master's degree and doctorate in medieval history at Harvard University, where he taught until 1941.

In 1941 he married Mary Elizabeth Critchfield; they have a son and two daughters. Keeney died on June 18, 1980, in Providence, Rhode Island, at the age of 65.

== Career ==
Subsequently, he served as an intelligence officer for the U.S. Army following the Japanese attack on Pearl Harbor. He received the Bronze Star Medal, the Purple Heart, and the Silver Star while serving with the 35th Infantry in World War II.

=== Brown University faculty ===
Keeney was hired by Brown University in 1946 as an assistant professor of history. In 1955 he was chosen to succeed Henry Wriston as the 12th President of Brown.

=== Brown University presidency ===
During Keeney's administration, Brown's operating budget tripled to $25 million a year; its endowment doubled to $55 million, and the value of its physical plant doubled to $40 million. "At college age, you can tell who is best at taking tests and going to school, but you can't tell who the best people are. That worries the hell out of me." Keeney initiated a new admissions policy under which 10% of the places in Brown's freshman class (about 650 students) were reserved for youngsters whose grades ordinarily would not qualify them for an Ivy League college—but who exhibit some "outstanding characteristic". They referred to themselves as "Tom Sawyers", many of whom went on to become Brown's most successful graduates.

By expressing his interest in the Dexter Asylum property, Keeney was instrumental in getting the City of Providence to put the property on auction in 1957. Brown won the auction with a bid of $1,000,777, or $25,653 per acre. Brown built a hockey rink, soccer fields, baseball diamonds and other recreational and athletic facilities on the land.

Keeney was elected to the American Academy of Arts and Sciences in 1957.

In 1964 he started a "big brother" exchange program with tiny (500 students) Tougaloo College in Jackson, Mississippi, the state's only integrated college. Keeney never ducked away from controversy. Although its close relationship with Brown allowed Tougaloo to reap financial and academic rewards including grants from the Ford Foundation, Keeney made sure that the college would "never again be at the center of civil rights activity" and used his influence to retire Dan Beittel from Tougaloo's presidency.

In 1964 he stoutly defended his director of health services, Roswell Johnson, who had prescribed birth control pills for a handful of marriage-bound students at nearby Pembroke College (Brown University), Brown's female counterpart.

Keeney was elected to the American Philosophical Society in 1965.

According to a 1978 article in New Times magazine, Keeney's association with the CIA continued during his time at Brown, including a year in 1951 when Keeney left Brown to work full-time for the agency. Keeney denied many of the allegations of the article.

=== National Endowment for the Humanities ===
Keeney served as the first Chair of the National Endowment for the Humanities from 1966 to 1970.

In 1963, Keeney served as Chair of the National Commission on the Humanities, organized by the American Council of Learned Societies, the Council of Graduate Schools in America, and the United Chapters of Phi Beta Kappa and tasked with studying "the state of the humanities in America". In April 1964, the commission released a report recommending "the establishment...of a National Humanities Foundation". President Lyndon B. Johnson, who delivered a speech at Brown on federal support for higher education later that year, lent his support to the idea of creating a foundation for the humanities and chose Keeney to be its first Chair. While Keeney was wrapping up his presidency at Brown during the 1965-66 school year, Henry Allen Moe, President of the American Philosophical Society, served as interim chairman until Keeney took over in July 1966.

== Publications ==
- Judgment by Peers 1949
- Life And Works Of John Hay, 1838-1905 1961
- The Expectations of Education 1973

== See also ==
- National Endowment for the Humanities

Academic offices
| Preceded by Henry Wriston | President of Brown University; 1955–1966 | Succeeded by Ray Heffner |
