= Donald Hornig =

American chemist and university president (1920–2013)

14th President of Brown University
- In office 1970–1976
- Preceded by: Ray Heffner
- Succeeded by: Howard Swearer

Director of the Office of Science and Technology
- In office January 24, 1964 – January 20, 1969
- President: Lyndon B. Johnson
- Preceded by: Jerome Wiesner
- Succeeded by: Lee DuBridge

Personal details
- Born: Donald Frederick Hornig; August 17, 1920 Milwaukee, Wisconsin, U.S.
- Died: January 21, 2013 (aged 92) Providence, Rhode Island, U.S.
- Spouse: Lilli Hornig
- Education: Harvard University (BS, MS, PhD)

Donald Frederick Hornig (March 17, 1920 – January 21, 2013) was an American chemist, explosives expert, teacher and presidential science advisor. He served as president of Brown University from 1970 to 1976.

== Life and career ==
Hornig was born in Milwaukee, Wisconsin, the son of Chester Arthur Hornig and Emma Knuth. He attended Milwaukee Country Day School, then earned his undergraduate degree in chemistry from Harvard University. He was awarded his Ph.D. from Harvard University in 1943, at the age of 23, with a dissertation on An Investigation of the Shock Wave Produced by an Explosion in Air. On July 17, 1943, he was married to scientist Lilli Hornig. The couple had four children together: three girls, Joanna, Ellen, and Leslie, and one boy, Christopher.

After graduating, he started work at the Underwater Explosives Laboratory of the Woods Hole Oceanographic Institute. While there, according to one obituary, he received an invitation to begin a new job, but he was not told what his duties would be, nor, initially, to where he would relocate. At first he refused, but Harvard University President James B. Conant helped persuade him to reconsider. Thus, he joined the Los Alamos Laboratory, where he was a group leader in the Manhattan Project. He worked on the firing unit that was used for the implosion of the plutonium device. He helped prepare the first atomic bomb, Trinity, and witnessed its explosion, the first detonation of a nuclear device. He was sent up to the top of the tower twice the previous day to reassure a nervous Robert Oppenheimer that all was well and after working on the high voltage capacitors that fire the multiple detonators, he was the last man to leave the tower.

In 1946 he joined the staff of Brown University as an assistant professor, and became a full professor in 1951. From 1951 to 1952 he was associate dean of the graduate school, then acting dean the following year. In 1957 he became a member of the National Academy of Sciences and the same year he moved to Princeton University in 1957. Later became chairman of the Princeton chemistry department.

Shortly before President John F. Kennedy was assassinated in 1963, he announced Hornig as the presidential science advisor. Hornig assumed office on January 24, 1964, but did not get along with the new president, Lyndon Baines Johnson, who had poor relationships with many scientists. He left office at the end of the president's term in 1969, and accepted an executive position with Eastman Kodak Company.

In 1970 he became president of Brown University, and he remained in office until he resigned in 1976. The end of his term was noted for financial cutbacks at the university, which was met by student protests. Thereafter he became Professor of Chemistry in Public Health at Harvard University. From 1987 to 1990 he served the Harvard University School of Public Health as chairman of the Department of Environmental Health. He retired in 1990.

Since 2013, Hornig has been listed on the Advisory Council of the National Center for Science Education.

Hornig died from Alzheimer's disease in Providence, Rhode Island, on January 21, 2013.

== In popular culture ==
In the 1989 film Fat Man and Little Boy, directed by Roland Joffé, Hornig was portrayed by actor Jim True-Frost.

In the 2023 film Oppenheimer, directed by Christopher Nolan, Hornig was portrayed by actor David Rysdahl.

== Awards and honors ==
- Winner of the Charles Lathrop Parsons Award of the American Chemical Society, 1967.
- Honorary LL.D from Boston College, November 12, 1966.
- Honorary D.Sc. from the University of Maryland, 1965.
- Honorary D.Sc. from Syracuse University, 1968.
- Member of the National Academy of Sciences.
- Member of the American Academy of Arts and Sciences.
- Member of the American Philosophical Society.
- Recipient of a Guggenheim Fellowship.
- Recipient of a Fulbright Fellowship.

Government offices
Preceded by Jerome Wiesner	Director of the Office of Science and Technology; 1964–1969	Succeeded by Lee DuBridge
Academic offices
Preceded by Ray Heffner	President of Brown University; 1970–1976	Succeeded by Howard Swearer
