= Asa Messer =

The Reverend Asa Messer
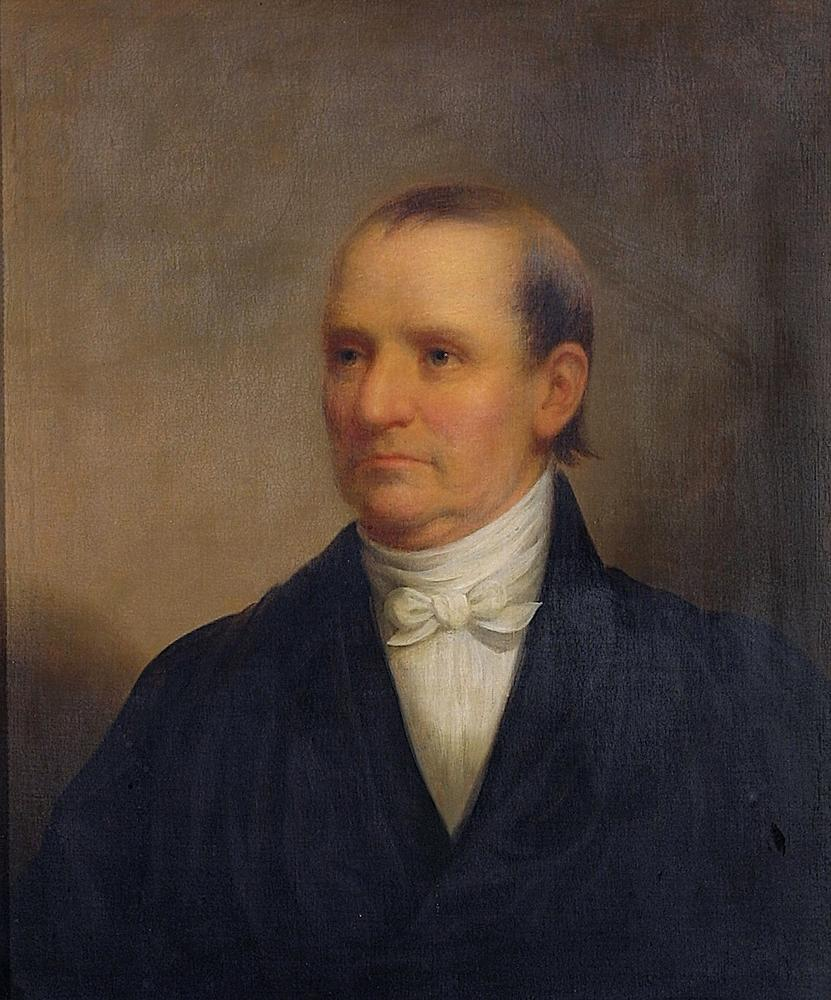
- Asa Messer, painted by James Sullivan Lincoln

3rd President of Brown University
- In office 1802–1826
- Preceded by: Jonathan Maxcy
- Succeeded by: Francis Wayland

Personal details
- Born: May 31, 1769 Methuen, Province of Massachusetts Bay, British America
- Died: October 11, 1836 (aged 67) Providence, Rhode Island, U.S.
- Resting place: North Burial Ground; Providence, Rhode Island, U.S.
- Education: The College of Rhode Island and Providence Plantations

Asa Messer (May 31, 1769 – October 11, 1836) was an American Baptist clergyman and educator. He was President of Brown University from 1804 to 1826.

== Early life ==
Messer was born in Methuen, Massachusetts. He graduated from Brown University (then called the College of Rhode Island and Providence Plantations) in 1790.

== Career ==
He was named tutor in the College in 1791, and served as librarian from 1792 to 1799. He was appointed professor of learned languages in 1796, and professor of natural philosophy in 1799. In 1802 he succeeded Jonathan Maxcy as president pro tempore for two years before being named president in 1804.

In 1812 he received the degree of LL.D. from the University of Vermont. Messer was elected a member of the American Antiquarian Society in 1815. In 1818 he declined an appointment as justice of the Rhode Island Supreme Court, finding the appointment incompatible with his college office. In 1820 he received the degree of D.D. from Harvard. Though as Brown's president Messer worked to make an education available to students of differing means, the student body became increasingly unruly during Messer's tenure, culminating in numerous incidents of vandalism to the chapel and library in the 1820s. Messer resigned as president on September 23, 1826.

Though ordained a Baptist minister in 1801, Messer did not serve as a church pastor. He patented two flumes in the 1820s and owned a farm in Fishersfield, New Hampshire, and part of a cotton mill in Wrentham, Massachusetts. Messer ran as an unsuccessful candidate in the 1830 Rhode Island gubernatorial election.

Asa Messer Elementary School in Providence, Rhode Island is named in his honor.

Academic offices
Preceded by Jonathan Maxcy	President of Brown University; 1802–1826	Succeeded by Francis Wayland
