= Ray Heffner =

American academic administrator (1925–2012)

13th President of Brown University
- In office 1966–1969
- Preceded by: Barnaby Keeney
- Succeeded by: Donald Hornig

Personal details
- Born: May 7, 1925 Durham, North Carolina, U.S.
- Died: November 28, 2012 (aged 87) Coralville, Iowa
- Education: Yale College

Ray Lorenzo Heffner (March 7, 1925 – November 28, 2012) was an American educator and president of Brown University. He served in the United States Navy during World War II and graduated from Yale College in 1948, where he was elected to Phi Beta Kappa, the Elizabethan Club, and Scroll and Key. He earned his master's degree at Yale in 1950 and his Ph.D., also from Yale, in 1953 following the completion of a dissertation on the Elizabethan poet Michael Drayton.

Heffner was a Guggenheim Fellow for the academic year 1959–1960. In 1966, he accepted the presidency of Brown University. He resigned the presidency of Brown in 1969 stating, “I have simply reached the conclusion that I do not enjoy being a university president.”

Heffner died November 28, 2012, at Lantern Park Nursing & Rehabilitation Center in Coralville, Iowa.

Academic offices
Preceded by Barnaby Keeney	President of Brown University; 1966–1969	Succeeded by Donald Hornig
