= Faunt =

Faunt is a surname. Notable people with the name include:

- Arthur Faunt (1554–1591), English theologian
- Jason Faunt (born 1974), American actor
- Nicholas Faunt (fl. 1572–1608), English politician
- William Faunt (1495/1496–1559), English politician

== See also ==
- Faunce (surname)
