= Lilli Hornig =

Czech-born American scientist

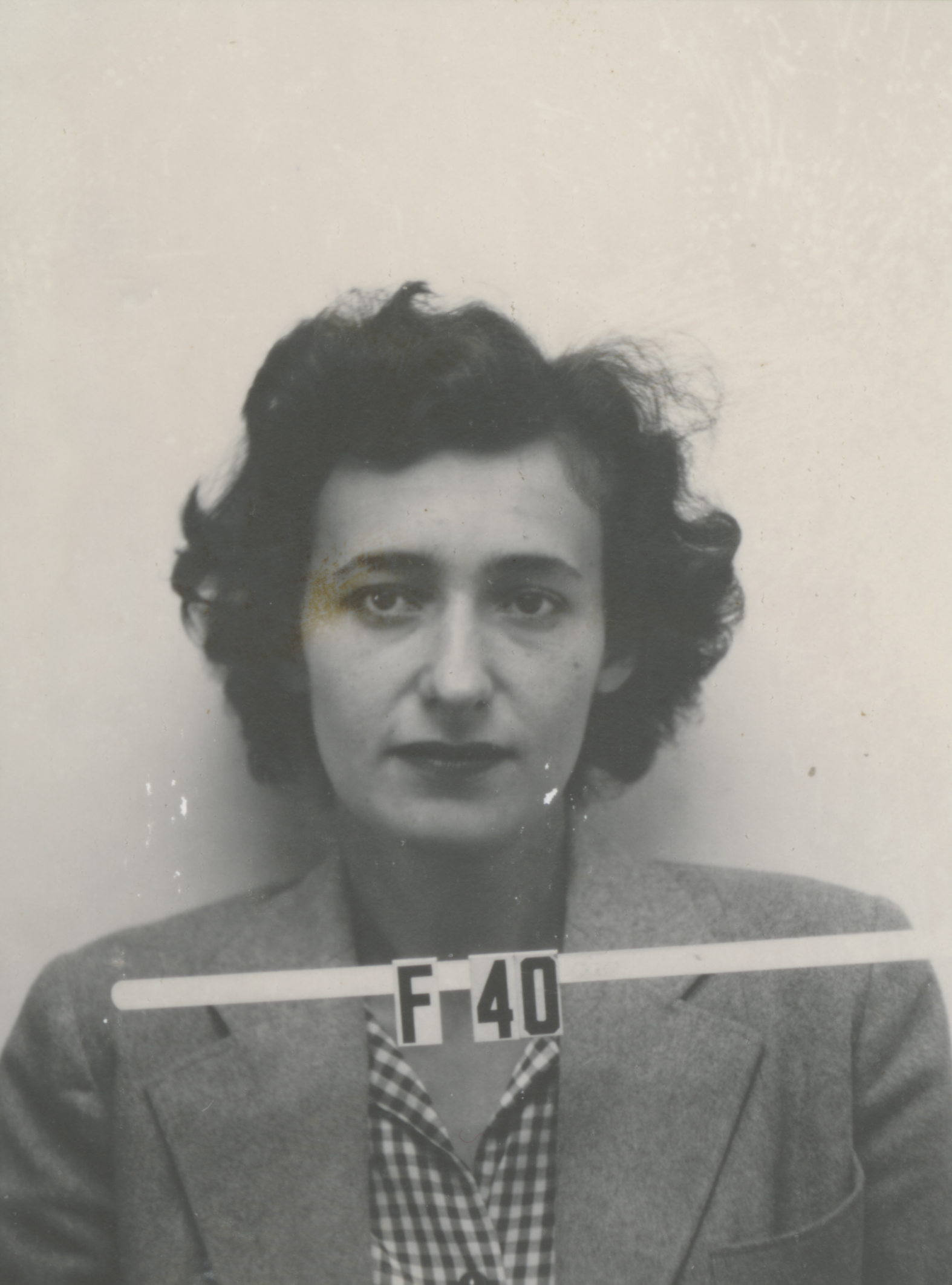
- Hornig's Los Alamos ID photo, c. 1944
- Born: Lilli Schwenk; Czech: Lilli Schwenková; March 22, 1921; Ústí nad Labem, Czechoslovakia
- Died: November 17, 2017 (aged 96); Providence, Rhode Island, U.S.
- Spouse: Donald Hornig

Academic background
- Education: Bryn Mawr College (BA); Harvard University (MA, PhD)

Academic work
- Institutions: Manhattan Project; Brown University; Trinity College
- Notable works: Higher Education Resource Services

Lilli Hornig (née Schwenk, Czech: Lilli Schwenková; March 22, 1921 – November 17, 2017) was a Czech-born American scientist and feminist activist. She worked on the Manhattan Project.

== Early life ==
Hornig was born in Ústí nad Labem in 1921 into a Jewish family to Erwin Schwenk, an organic chemist, and the former Rascha Shapiro, a pediatrician.

In 1929 her family moved to Berlin. Four years later she and her mother came to the United States, following her father who had moved there to escape the Nazis. As her parents were Jewish, her father was threatened with imprisonment in a concentration camp.

She obtained her BA from Bryn Mawr in 1942 and her Ph.D. from Harvard University in 1950. In 1943, she married Donald Hornig. They had four children.

== Career ==
Hornig accompanied her husband to Los Alamos where he had obtained a job. After she was originally asked to take a typing test, her scientific skills were recognized and she was given a job as a staff scientist working with plutonium chemistry for the Manhattan Project.

When it was later decided that plutonium chemistry was too dangerous for women, Hornig worked in high-explosive lenses instead. While at Los Alamos, she signed a petition urging that the first atom bomb be used on an uninhabited island as a demonstration.

Hornig later became a chemistry professor at Brown University, and chairwoman of the chemistry department at Trinity College in Washington, D.C. She was appointed by then-current President Lyndon Johnson as a member of a mission to the Republic of Korea that began the founding of the Korea Institute for Science and Technology.

A feminist, Hornig was the founding director of HERS (Higher Education Resource Services) under the auspices of the Committee for the Concerns of Women in New England Colleges and Universities first organized by Sheila Tobias. She served on equal opportunity committees for the National Science Foundation, the National Cancer Institute, and the American Association for the Advancement of Science. She was the research chair of the Committee for the Equality of Women at Harvard, and consulted with and participated in many studies of women's science education and careers.

Hornig was a Life Trustee of the Woods Hole Oceanographic Institution and was a trustee of the Wheeler School.

== Death ==
Hornig died on November 17, 2017, in Providence, Rhode Island, aged 96 from organ failure.

== In popular culture ==
In the 2023 film Oppenheimer, directed by Christopher Nolan, Hornig was portrayed by actor Olivia Thirlby.

== Works ==
- Climbing the Academic Ladder: Doctoral Women Scientists in Academe (1979) OCLC 967445183
- Equal Rites, Unequal Outcomes: Women in American Research Universities. Innovations in Science Education and Technology. Springer Netherlands. 2012. ISBN 978-94-010-0007-9.
- Women Scientists in Industry and Government: How Much Progress in the 1970s. Washington, D.C., 1980. ISBN 9780309030236, OCLC 256349315
- Scientific sexism, New York: New York Academy of Sciences, 1979. OCLC 802457414

Translations

- From My Life. The Memoirs of Richard Willstätter. New York: W.A. Benjamin, 1965. OCLC 612707312
