= Sears House (Staunton, Virginia) =

Historic house in Virginia, United States

- U.S. National Register of Historic Places
- Virginia Landmarks Register
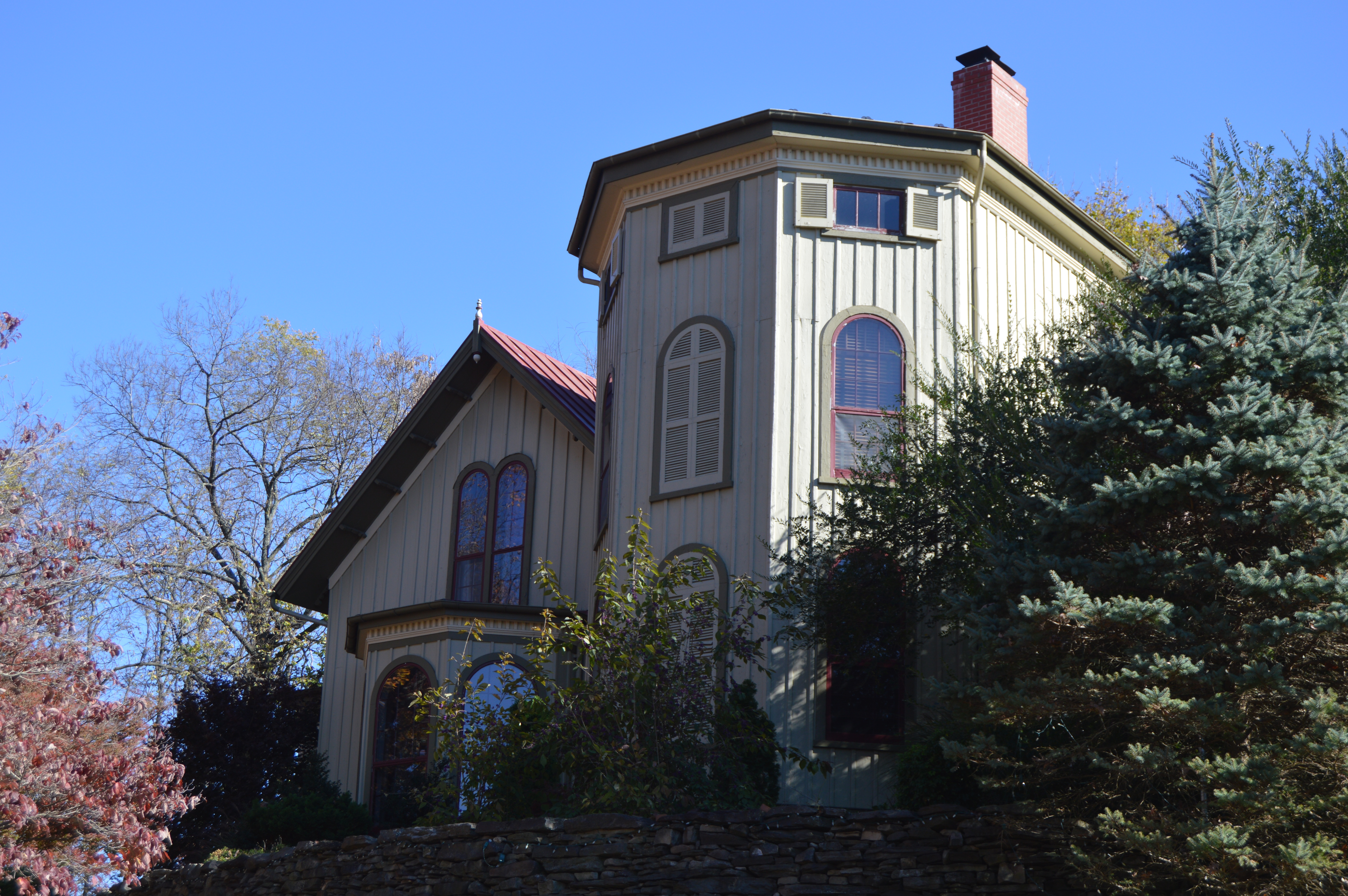
- Northern side of the house

- Location within Virginia Location within the United States
- Location: Sears Hill Rd. in Woodrow Wilson City Park, Staunton, Virginia
- Coordinates: 38°8′45″N 79°4′20″W
- Area: 9.9 acres (4.0 ha)
- Built: c. 1860
- NRHP reference No.: 72001530
- VLR No.: 132-0013

Significant dates
- Added to NRHP: February 23, 1972
- Designated VLR: November 16, 1971

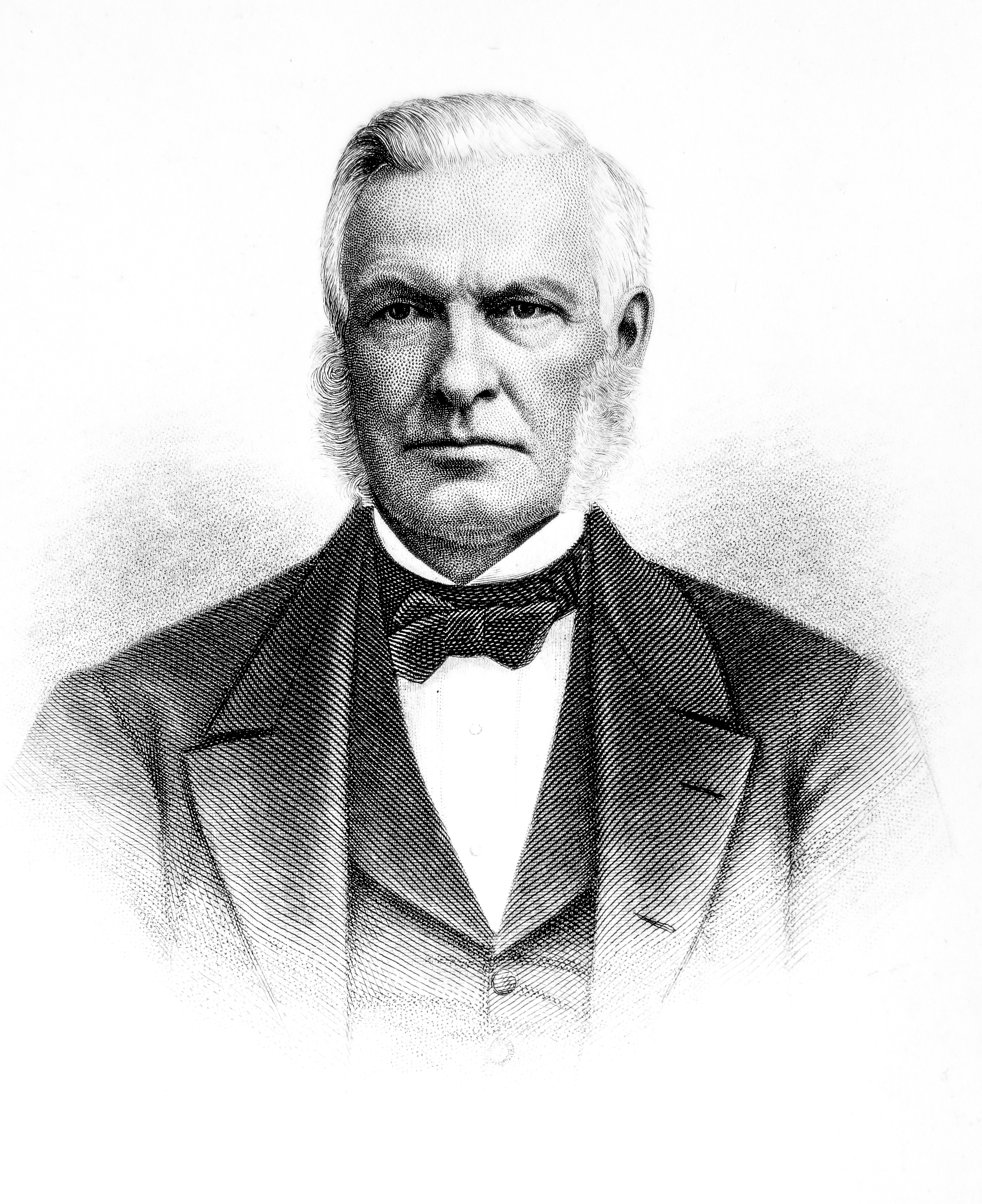
Barnas Sears

Sears House is a historic home located at Staunton, Virginia. It was built about 1860, and is a 1 1/2-story, frame dwelling representative of a small "bracketed cottage" popularized by Andrew Jackson Downing. It is sheathed with board-and-batten and is covered with a cross-gable roof. It features long, shallow-scrolled roof brackets, a three-bay arcaded front porch, and a three-story octagonal-ended tower covered by a shallow hipped roof with dentiled cornice. It was the home of Dr. Barnas Sears (1802-1880), a prominent educator, who owned and occupied the house from 1867 until his death.

The house was built by Col. Robert Lewis Madison, MD, and designed by his wife, Helen Banister Madison. Their son, Robert Lee Madison, founder and former president of Western Carolina University, in Cullowhee, North Carolina, was born there on February 17, 1867, shortly before the house was sold to Sears for $4,000.

It was added to the National Register of Historic Places in 1972.
