= Clarence Barbour =

President of Brown University

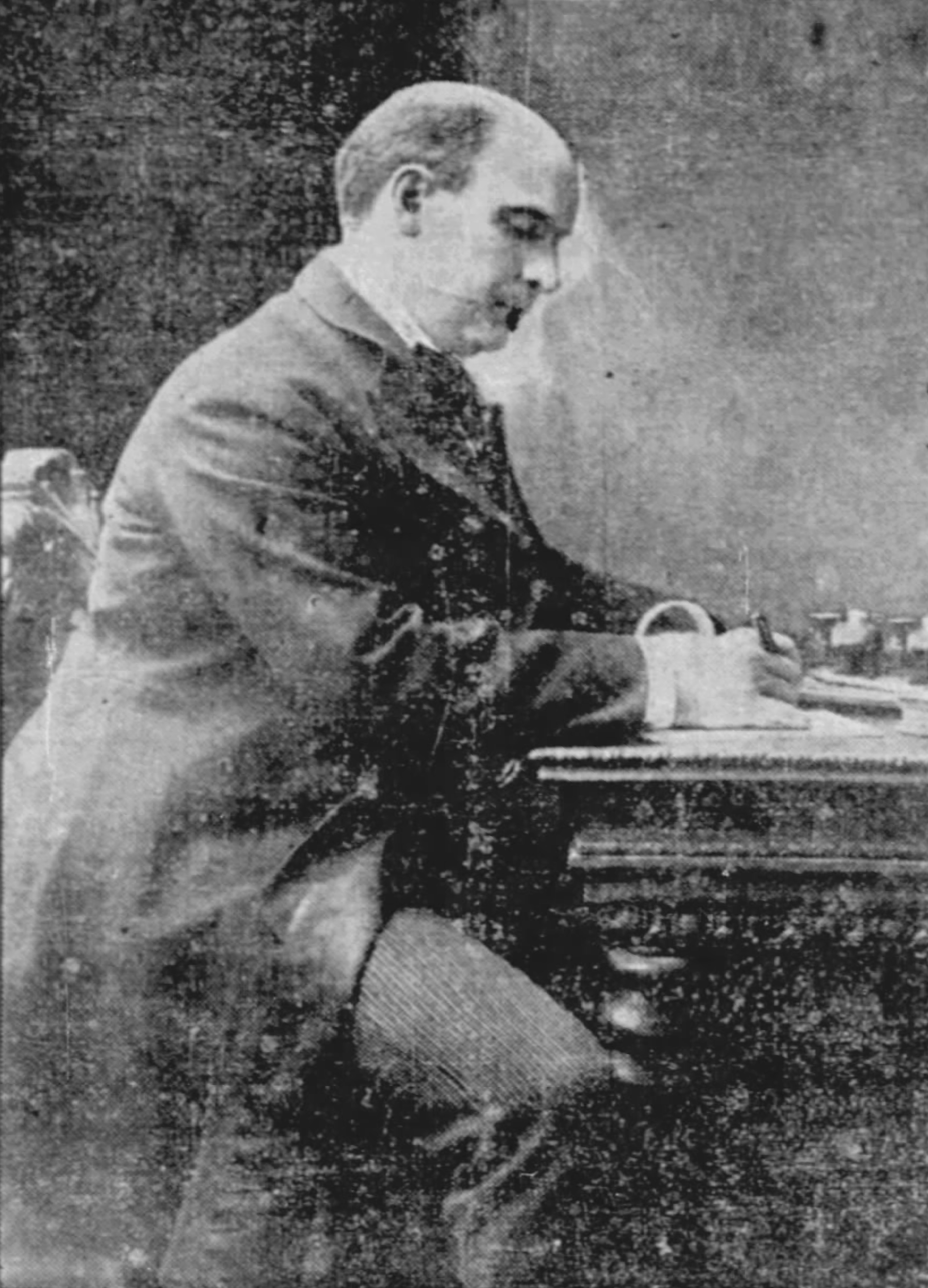

10th President of Brown University
- In office 1929–1937
- Preceded by: William Faunce
- Succeeded by: Henry Wriston

Personal details
- Born: April 21, 1867 Hartford, Connecticut, U.S.
- Died: January 16, 1937 (aged 69) Providence, Rhode Island, U.S.
- Resting place: North Burial Ground; Providence, Rhode Island, U.S.
- Spouse: Florence Newell
- Education: Brown University

Clarence Augustus Barbour (April 21, 1867 – January 16, 1937) was an American Baptist clergyman and educator most notable for having served as the president of Brown University. He and his wife, Florence, put together the tune from the hymn "Materna" by Samuel A. Ward and the poem "America the Beautiful" by Katherine Lee Bates to create the standard anthem we all love now. This was in 1904. People had fallen in love with the poem but always sang to a different tune.

== Biography ==
=== Early life ===
He was born on April 21, 1867, in Hartford, Connecticut. He graduated from Brown University in 1888.

=== Career ===
He served as the president of his alma mater, Brown University, from 1929 to 1936. He also served as president of the Rochester Theological Seminary for thirteen years. He was a member of the Laymen's Commission that produced "Re-Thinking Missions: A Laymen's Inquiry after One Hundred Years" (1932), which was a harsh critique of foreign missions.

His wife, Florence Newell Barbour, was a musician and composer.

=== Death ===
He died on January 16, 1937, in Providence, Rhode Island, at the age of 69, two weeks before his planned retirement from Brown.

== Selected works ==
- Barbour, Clarence A. (1910), Fellowship Hymns, New York: YMCA Press, OCLC 61651063
- Barbour, Clarence A. (1911), The Bible in the World of Today, New York: YMCA Press, OCLC 5580727
- Barbour, Clarence A. (1912), Making Religion Efficient, New York: YMCA Press, OCLC 5428960
- Barbour, Clarence A. (1917), The Service Song Book, New York: YMCA Press, OCLC 12175612
- Hocking, William Ernest, Re-Thinking Missions: A Laymen's Inquiry after One Hundred Years (1932) Harper & Brothers, New York City.

Academic offices
Preceded by Joseph W. A. Stewart (acting)	President of the Rochester Theological Seminary; 1915–1928	Office abolished
First	President of the Colgate Rochester Divinity School; 1928–1929	Succeeded by Albert W. Beaven
Preceded by William Faunce	President of Brown University; 1929–1937	Succeeded by Henry Wriston
