= Daniel Faunce =

American minister and writer (1829–1911)

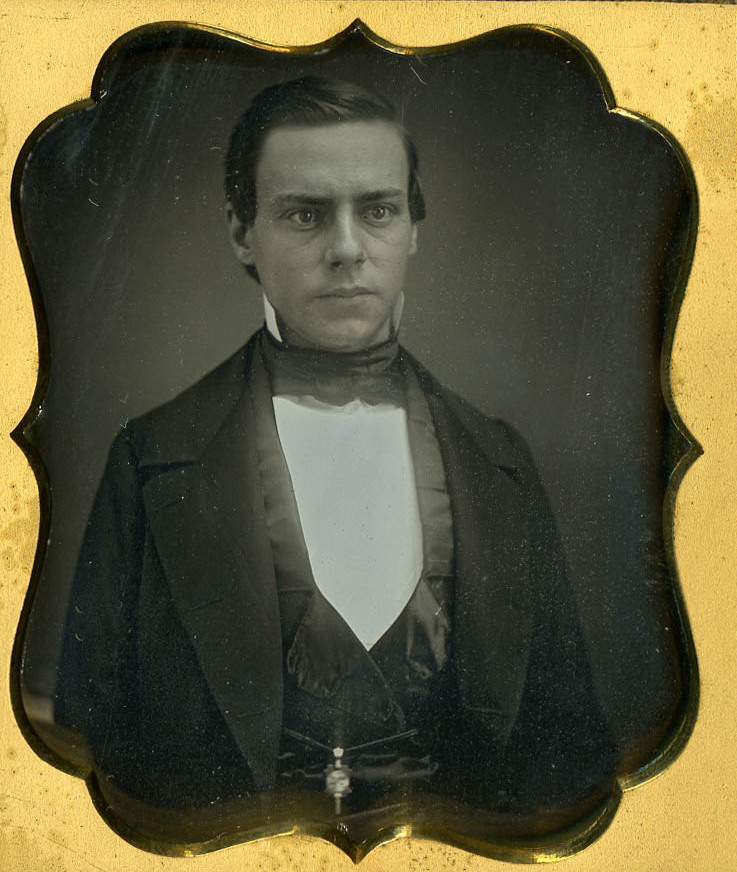
- Born: January 3, 1829; Plymouth, Massachusetts, U.S.
- Died: January 3, 1911 (aged 82); Providence, Rhode Island, U.S.
- Resting place: Pine Grove Cemetery; Lynn, Massachusetts, U.S.
- Education: Amherst College
- Occupation: Clergy

Daniel Worcester Faunce (January 3, 1829 – January 3, 1911) was an American clergyman and the father of William Faunce, born at Plymouth, Massachusetts to Peleg and Olive (Finney) Faunce.

Graduating from Amherst College in 1850, he then studied at the Newton Theological Institution, was ordained to the Baptist ministry in 1853, and thereafter held charges from 1853 to 1866 in Somerville, Worcester, and Malden — all in Massachusetts — in Concord, New Hampshire (1866–1875), Lynn, Massachusetts (1875–1881), Washington, D.C. (1881–1889), West Newton, Massachusetts (1889–1893), and Pawtucket, Rhode Island (1894–1899). He was a member of the board of managers of the American Baptist Missionary Union. His works include:

- Words and Works of Jesus (1873)
- Words and Acts of the Apostles (1874)
- The Christian in the World (1875)
- A Young Man's Difficulties with his Bible (1877)
- The Christian Experience (1880)
- Hours with a Sceptic (1889)
- Prayer as a Theory and a Fact (1890)
- Advent and Ascension (1893)
- Shall We Believe in Divine Providence? (1900)
- The Mature Man's Difficulties with his Bible (1908)

Faunce married Mary Parkhurst Perry, August 15, 1853. They had five children. After she died in 1888, he married a second time. He died on January 3, 1911, in Providence, Rhode Island, at the age of 82.
