= Silver Burdett =

American textbook publisher

- Status: Defunct
- Founded: 1888
- Defunct: 1999
- Country of origin: United States
- Publication types: Books
- Nonfiction topics: Music

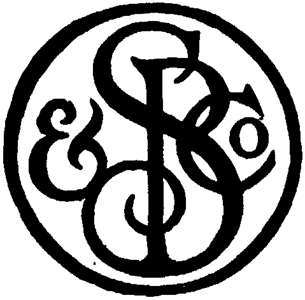
Silver, Burdett and Company logo, 1918

Silver Burdett was an American primary education textbook publishing imprint previously operated by Pearson Education, which is a division of media conglomerate Pearson PLC. The trademark was last owned by Savvas Learning Company.

== History ==
Silver Burdett first formed as a company in 1888 when Frank W. Burdett purchased a controlling interest in the textbook publishing company, Silver & Company. In 1962, it was acquired by Time Inc., and it became the distributor of Time-Life Books to schools and libraries. In 1965 it became the first division of the General Learning Corporation, a multi-million dollar collaboration between Time Inc. and General Electric. Simon & Schuster purchased it in 1986, and merged it with Ginn & Company, a leading el-hi (elementary school and high school) textbook publisher - which formed the imprint Silver Burdett & Ginn. In 1998, Pearson PLC acquired Simon & Schuster's educational businesses (which included Silver Burdett & Ginn) from S&S parent Viacom, and created Pearson Education.

== Termination ==
Pearson closed Silver Burdett in 1999. The Silver Burdett Ginn name persisted for some time as Silver Burdett Ginn Religion, a Catholic publishing division operated under Scott Foresman before it was sold to RCL Benziger in 2007 (which also acquired Benziger from McGraw-Hill in the same year). The trademark registration for Silver Burdett Ginn was transferred to Savvas Learning Company after Pearson sold its US K-12 education division in 2020 and lapsed in 2021.
