= Samuel G. Plantz =

American minister

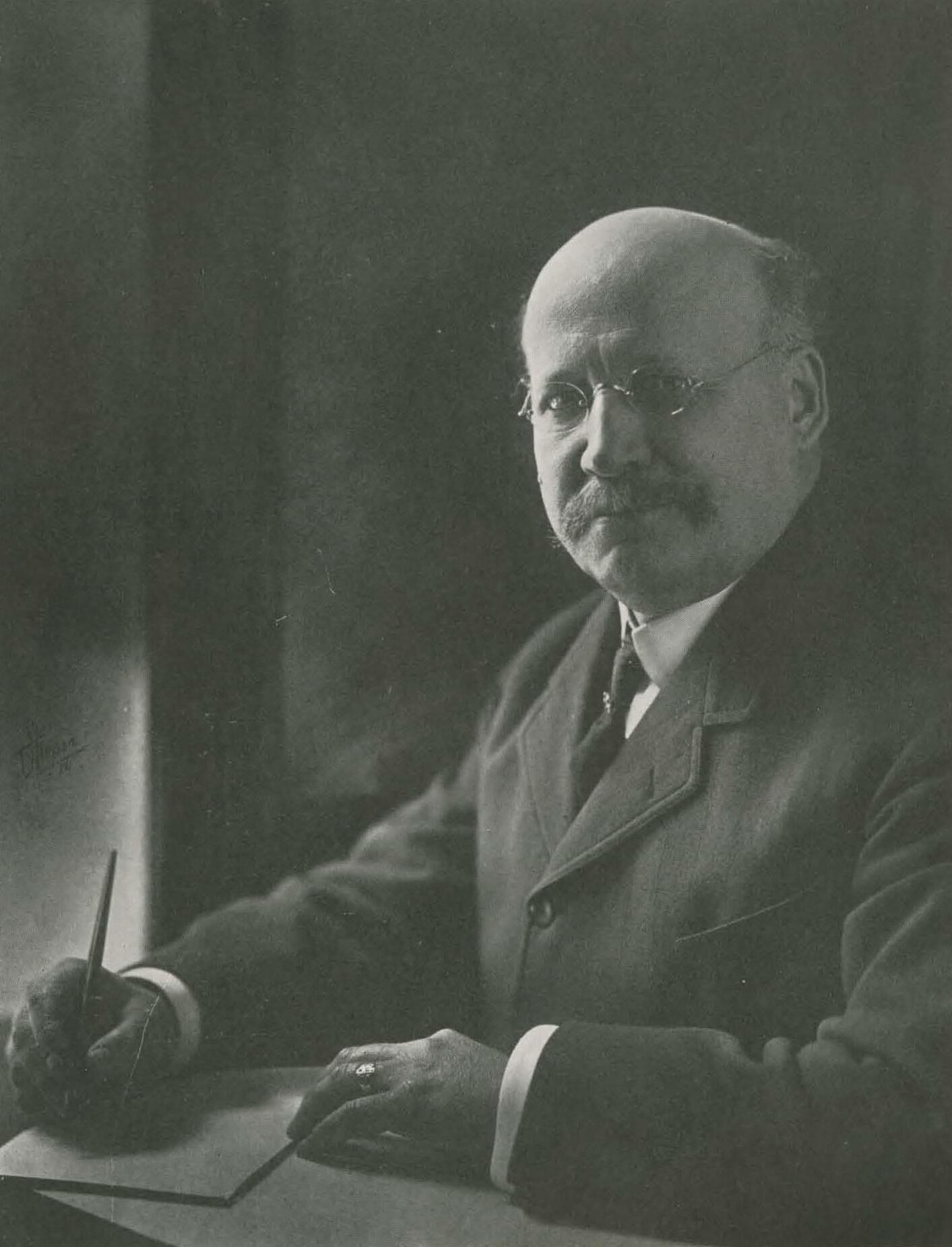
Plantz c. 1919

Samuel G. Plantz (June 13, 1859 – November 14, 1924) was a Methodist minister and seventh president of Lawrence University.

He was born in Gloversville, New York on June 13, 1859, second child of James and Elsie Ann (Stoller) Plantz. He was raised in Emerald Grove, Wisconsin. He attended Milton College, and received his Bachelor of Arts degree from Lawrence University in 1880. He was a student at Berlin University, 1890–91. He then went on to receive his Bachelor of Sacred Theology and Ph.D. degrees from the Boston University School of Theology in 1883.

Plantz became president of Lawrence University in 1894, and served until his death on November 14, 1924, in Sturgeon Bay. During his tenure, the student body increased from 200 to 800 and the number of faculty from nine to 68. Numerous campus buildings were also erected during his presidency, including the prominent chapel. Plantz Hall, built in 1961, is named for him.

Preceded by Charles Wesley Gallagher	President of Lawrence University; 1894–1924	Succeeded by Henry Merritt Wriston
