= List of presidents of Brown University =

From 1765 to the 1920s, the president was required by the University Charter to be of the Baptist denomination.

The following is a list of presidents of Brown University:

No.	Image	President	Class	Term start	Term end	Ref.
Presidents of the College of Rhode Island (1764–1804)
1		James Manning (Note: The College in the English Colony of Rhode Island and Providence Plantations was founded in Warren, (1765) and relocated to Providence (1770). Brown's current campus on College Hill is established with the construction of University Hall (1770). The college closed in December 1776 due to the American Revolution and reopened in September 1782.) (1738–1791)	–	1765	July 29, 1791 (Note: Died in office.)	
2		Jonathan Maxcy (Note: First alum to be president and youngest president in Brown's history; Maxcy's reputation as a skilled orator benefited the reputation of the fledgling college. Enrollment passed 100 students (1800).) (1768–1820)	1787	1792	1802	
Presidents of Brown University (1804–present)
3		Asa Messer (Note: The College of Rhode Island and Providence Plantations was renamed Brown University following a gift from Nicholas Brown, Jr (1804). A program in medical study was organized in 1811. The Messer administration was characterized by increasing unruliness and misbehavior of students.) (1769–1836)	1790	1802	1826	
4		Francis Wayland (Note: Wayland sought out to improve student discipline. Medical instruction was suspended (1827) following a dispute over a proposed residence requirement for medical professors. Brown established the third civilian engineering program in the country (1847). Wayland urged adoption of a broader curriculum (1850), laying the groundwork for the Open Curriculum.) (1796–1865)	–	1827	1855	
5		Barnas Sears (Note: Despite the Panic of 1857 and Civil War, Sears oversaw the construction of a new chemistry laboratory and an increase in the University's endowment. Entrance and degree requirements were made stricter, benefiting the reputation of the University. Sears was widely popular among students.) (1802–1880)	1825	1855	1867	
6		Alexis Caswell (Note: The University's financial assets grew by nearly 85%.Tuition, faculty salaries, and enrollment all increased.) (1799–1877)	1822	1868	1872	
7		Ezekiel Robinson (Note: Graduate study was instituted (1888–1889). Robinson (1878), Slater (1879), and Sayles Halls (1881) were constructed.) (1815–1894)	1838	1872	1889	
8		Elisha Andrews (Note: Enrollment more than doubled. The graduate program was expanded and the Women's College was founded (1891).) (1844–1917)	1870	1889	1898	
9		William Faunce (Note: Enrollment passed 1,000 (1915) and doubled to pass 2,000 (1925). The Women's College was renamed Pembroke College in Brown University (1928).) (1859–1930)	1880	1899	1929	
10		Clarence Barbour (Note: Last of long line of Baptist minister Presidents) (1867–1937)	1888	1929	January 16, 1937	
11		Henry Wriston (Note: First non-Baptist (Methodist) president and first president since Wayland to not be a Brown alumnus) (1889–1978)	–	1937	1955	
12		Barnaby Keeney (Note: Brown purchased the Dexter Asylum property.) (1914–1980)	–	1955	1966	
13		Ray Heffner (Note: Brown's New Curriculum was passed. Heffner resigned after only three years, stating "I have simply reached the conclusion that I do not enjoy being a university president.") (1925–2012)	–	1966	1969	
14		Donald Hornig (Note: Pembroke fully merged with the College of Brown University (1971). A medical program was re-established (1972).) (1920–2013)	–	1970	1976	
15		Howard Swearer (Note: Under Swearer's leadership, Brown advanced in rankings, saw a threefold increase in research grants, quadrupled its previously-dwindling endowment, and grew in popularity. The Watson Institute was founded as the Institute for International Studies (1986). Brown's athletic facilities expanded significantly with the construction of both the Olney-Margolies Athletic Center (1981) and the Pizzitola Sports Center (1988).) (1932–1991)	–	1977	1988	
16		Vartan Gregorian (Note: Vartan Gregorian was Brown's first foreign-born president. During his tenure, Brown saw fundraising success, with the University's endowment surpassing $1 billion. Applications increased, undergraduate scholarships doubled, and the University's reputation grew.) (1934–2021)	–	1989	1997	
interim		James R. Pomerantz	–	October 1, 1997	January 3, 1998	
17		Gordon Gee (Note: Plans were announced for a large biomedical sciences building requiring the sale of $80 million in bonds; funds were cut for a popular string quartet drawing criticism that Gee's vision is at odds with the University's liberal arts-oriented identity. Gee resigned abruptly after only two years in a move criticized by University leaders.) (1944–)	–	January 6, 1998	February 7, 2000 (Note: Resigned to lead Vanderbilt University.)	
interim		Sheila E. Blumstein (1944–)	–	February 9, 2000	June 30, 2001	
18		Ruth Simmons (Note: At the time of her appointment Simmons became Brown's first woman president and the first African-American president of an Ivy League university. In 2001, Time named Simmons America's best college president. The Sidney E. Frank Hall for Life Sciences (2006) and Granoff Center for the Creative Arts both opened (2011). Following a $100 million gift, the Medical School was renamed the Warren Alpert Medical School of Brown University (2007). The University opened a new medical campus in the Jewelry District (2011).) (1945–)	–	July 1, 2001	June 30, 2012	
19		Christina Paxson (Note: Christina Paxson is Brown's current president. During her tenure, Brown has established its School of Public Health, expanded the physical footprint of the School of Engineering, and completed a historically large fundraising campaign. The university has also undertaken a significant expansion of residential facilities, constructing its first new dormitories in 35 years.) (1960–)	–	July 1, 2012	present	

Table notes:
