= William Faunce =

American clergyman

The Reverend William Faunce
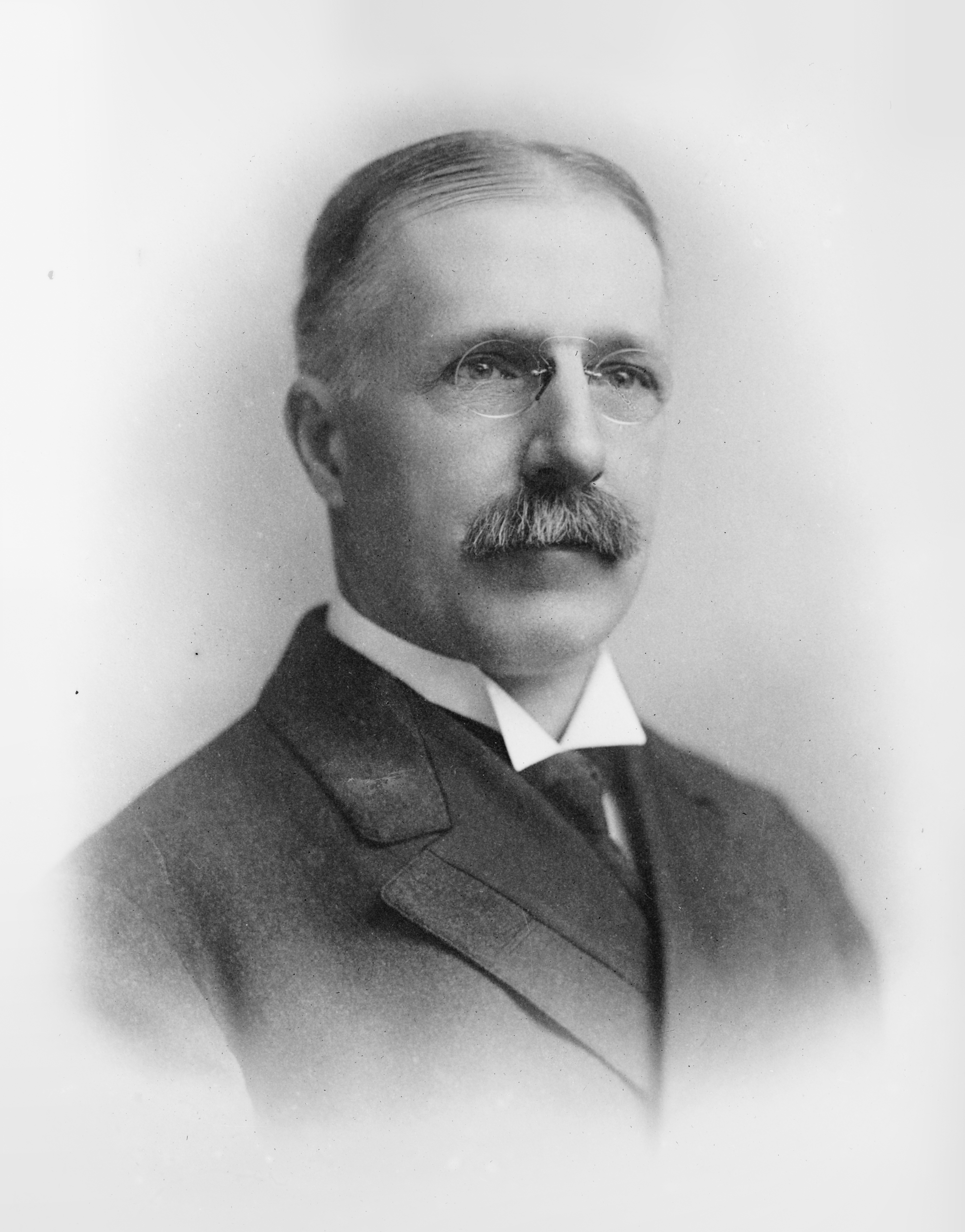

9th President of Brown University
- In office 1899–1929
- Preceded by: Elisha Andrews
- Succeeded by: Clarence Barbour

Personal details
- Born: William Herbert Perry Faunce; January 15, 1859 Worcester, Massachusetts, U.S.
- Died: January 31, 1930 (aged 71) Providence, Rhode Island, U.S.
- Resting place: Swan Point Cemetery, Providence, Rhode Island, U.S.
- Education: Brown University

William Herbert Perry Faunce (January 15, 1859 – January 31, 1930) was an American Baptist clergyman and educator.

== Biography ==
William Faunce was born at Worcester, Massachusetts. His father was clergyman Daniel Faunce. He graduated in 1880 at Brown University (where he then taught mathematics for a year), and at 1884 at Newton Theological Seminary, and from 1884 to 1889 was pastor of the State Street Baptist Church of Springfield, Massachusetts. From 1889 to 1899 he was pastor of the Fifth Avenue Baptist Church of New York City, New York, in 1896-97 he lectured in the Divinity School of the University of Chicago, and in 1898-99 he was a member of the board of resident preachers of Harvard University.

In 1899, he became president of Brown University; during his administration the endowment of the university was largely increased. Faunce was a guest preacher at Central Congregational Church in Providence, Rhode Island. He was Lyman Beecher lecturer at Yale University in 1907-08 and was prominent in the work of the Religious Education Association. His writings include numerous contributions, chiefly to religious periodicals, and the volumes The Educational Ideal in the Ministry (1909) and What Does Christianity Mean? (1912).

== Death ==
Faunce died on January 31, 1930, in Providence, Rhode Island, at the age of 71. Later that year, Brown's student center was renamed Faunce House in his honor, at the request of John D. Rockefeller Jr., who contributed $600,000 toward its renovation.

== Works ==
- The Educational Ideal in the Ministry (1908)
- What Does Christianity Mean? (1912)
- The Social Aspects of Foreign Missions (1914)
- The New Horizon of State and Church (1918)
- Religion and War (1918)
- Facing Life (1928)

Academic offices
Preceded by Elisha Andrews	President of Brown University; 1899–1929	Succeeded by Clarence Barbour
