= Francis Wayland =

American Baptist minister, educator and economist

The Reverend Francis Wayland
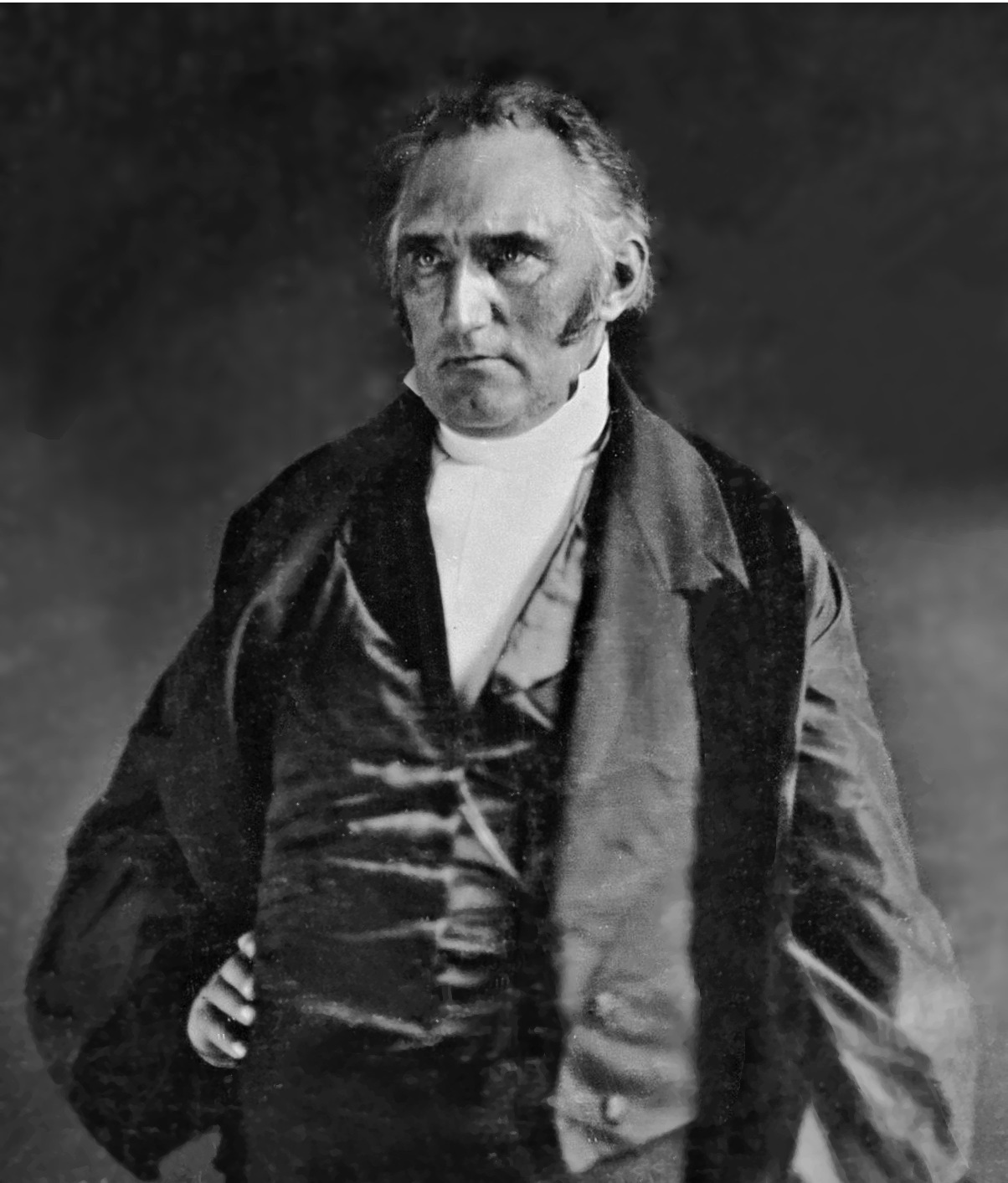
- Half plate daguerreotype

4th President of Brown University
- In office 1827–1855
- Preceded by: Asa Messer
- Succeeded by: Barnas Sears

Personal details
- Born: March 11, 1796 New York City, New York, U.S.
- Died: September 30, 1865 (aged 69) Providence, Rhode Island, U.S.
- Resting place: North Burial Ground; Providence, Rhode Island, U.S.
- Education: Union College

Francis Wayland (March 11, 1796 – September 30, 1865) was an American Baptist minister, educator and economist. He was president of Brown University and pastor of the First Baptist Church in America in Providence, Rhode Island. In Washington, D.C., Wayland Seminary was established in 1867, primarily to educate former slaves, and was named in his honor. (Note: In 1899, Wayland Seminary merged with another school to become the current Virginia Union University, at Richmond, Virginia.)

== Early life and family ==
Francis Wayland's father was an Englishman of the same name, who was also a Baptist pastor. Born in New York City in 1796, Wayland graduated from Union College in 1813 and studied medicine in Troy, under Dr. Ely Burritt and in New York City.

However, in 1816, he entered Andover Theological Seminary, where he was greatly influenced by Moses Stuart. He was too poor to conclude his course in theology, and in 1817-1821 was a tutor at Union College, to which, after five years as pastor of the First Baptist Church of Boston, he returned in 1826 as professor of natural philosophy.

He was one of the founders of Newton Theological Institution in 1825.

He was an early advocate of the temperance and anti-slavery causes, for many years was "inspector of the state prison and Providence county jail," president of the Prison Discipline Society, and active in prison reform and local charities. He was one of the "law and order" leaders during the "Dorr Rebellion" of 1842, and was called "the first citizen of Rhode Island."

One of the individuals that he supported, trained and encouraged was Leonard Black, author of The Life and Sufferings of Leonard Black, a Fugitive from Slavery who became a Baptist minister.

Wayland worked hard to prevent the local Baptist denominations from splitting into pro-slavery and anti-slavery factions, but ultimately failed in this attempt.

Wayland was elected a member of the American Philosophical Society in 1838 and the American Antiquarian Society in 1851.

== Brown presidency ==
In 1827 he became president of Brown University. In the twenty-eight years of his administration he gradually built up the college, improving academic discipline, formed a library and gave scientific studies a more prominent place. He also worked for higher educational ideals outside the college, writing text-books on ethics and economics, and promoting the free school system of Rhode Island and especially (1828) of Providence. His Thoughts on the Present Collegiate System in the United States (1842) and his Report to the Corporation of Brown University of 1850 pointed the way to educational reforms, particularly the introduction of industrial courses, which were only partially adopted in his lifetime.

Wayland's attempts to reform Brown's medical school were met with antagonism and resistance from the school's faculty and staff to the point where they resigned, and the medical program was eliminated.

Wayland was vividly remembered by members of the Brown community, including Charles T. Congdon and James B. Angell, who are quoted in the Encyclopedia Brunoniana.

Charles T. Congdon wrote in his Reminiscences of a Journalist (1880):

He was disobeyed with fear and trembling, and the boldest did not care to encounter his frown. He was majestic in manner, and could assume, if he pleased, a Rhadamanthine severity. It was a calamity to be called into that awful presence; and no student, of whatever character, ever made the least pretence of not being frightened at the summons. ... However loosely our tongues might wag, we thoroughly respected and even reverenced the president; and upon public occasions, when he put on his academic gown and cap, we were rather proud of his imposing appearance. ... In his later days, I have been told he exhibited marked urbanity and sweetness of disposition. Certainly there were small traces of either when any undergraduate was detected in an act of meanness or a flagrant violation of the university statutes. He had a heavy foot for a student’s door when it was not promptly opened after his official knock.

President of the University of Michigan James B. Angell Class of 1849, who wrote in Memories of Brown:

The discipline of the college was wholly in his hands. In administering it he was stern, at times imperious. But no graduate of his time ever failed to gain from him higher ideals of duty or lasting impulses to a noble and strenuous life. He said so many wise things to us and uttered them in so pithy and sententious a style that one could never forget them. I presume that my experience is like that of others, when I say that hardly a week of my life has passed in which I have not recalled some of his apt sayings and to my great advantage. Is there any better proof than that of the power of a teacher over his pupils?

He resigned the presidency of Brown in 1855, and served from 1857 to 1858 as pastor of the historic First Baptist Church in America, in Providence.

== Role in the development of public libraries ==
Wayland was a long time vocal advocate for libraries. His donation to the town of Wayland, Massachusetts, in 1851 for the establishment of a public library was the catalyst for legislation in Massachusetts allowing towns to establish libraries.

== Published work ==
Besides several volumes of sermons and addresses and the volumes already mentioned, he published:

- The Elements of Moral Science. New York: Cooke and Co. 1835. (repeatedly revised and translated into foreign languages)
- The Elements of Political Economy. New York: Leavitt, Lord. 1837. in which he advocated free trade
- The Limitations of Human Responsibility. Boston: Gould, Kendall & Lincoln. 1838.
- Richard Fuller; Francis Wayland (1860) [1845]. Domestic Slavery Considered as a Scriptural Institution (Rev. ed.). New York: Sheldon Lamport & Blakeman. [a debate with Rev. Richard Fuller of South Carolina]
- A Memoir of Harriet Ware: First Superintendent of the Children's Home, in the City of Providence. Providence: G. H. Whitney. 1850. Harriet Ware founded the Children's Friend Society
- A Memoir of the Life and Labors of the Rev. Adoniram Judson. Vol. I. Boston: Phillips, Sampson, and Company. 1853.
- A Memoir of the Life and Labors of the Rev. Adoniram Judson. Vol. II. Boston: Phillips, Sampson, and Company. 1853. Adoniram Judson was a missionary to Burma
- Elements of Intellectual Philosophy (1854)
- Notes on the Principles and Practices of Baptist Churches (1857)
- Letters on the Ministry of the Gospel (1863)
- a brief Memoir of Thomas Chalmers (1864).

Other works:

- The Duties of an American Citizen: Two Discourses. Boston: James Loring. 1825.
- Wayland, Francis (1834). The Moral Dignity of the Missionary Enterprise, a sermon. Derby.
- A Discourse: Delivered at the Dedication of Manning Hall. Providence: Marshall, Brown. 1835.
- Thoughts on the Present Collegiate System in the United States. Boston: Gould, Kendall & Lincoln. 1842.
- "Review:Thoughts on the Present Collegiate System in the United States". 55 (117). The North American Review. 1842: 302–43. JSTOR 25104445.
- University Sermons: Sermons Delivered in the Chapel of Brown University (3 ed.). Boston: Gould and Lincoln. 1854.
- Dr. Wayland on the Moral and Religious Aspects of the Nebraska Bill. Speech at Providence, R. I., March 7. Rochester, NY: W. N. Sage. 1854.
- Sermons to the Churches. New York: Sheldon, Blakeman. 1858.
- Francis Wayland III; H. L. Wayland (1867). A Memoir of the Life and Labors of Francis Wayland: Late President of Brown University. Vol. I. New York: Sheldon and Company.
- Francis Wayland III; H. L. Wayland (1867). A Memoir of the Life and Labors of Francis Wayland: Late President of Brown University. Vol. II. New York: Sheldon and Company.

== Legacy ==
The town of Wayland, Massachusetts was named in his honor. Wayland Seminary in Washington D.C., a predecessor of Virginia Union University was named for him. Wayland Academy in Beaver Dam, Wisconsin was also named in his honor in 1855. The Wayland Day lectures at Keio University in Tokyo, Japan, were named in honor of Wayland, whose writings had a lasting effect on the founder of the oldest university in Japan.

== Prominent son ==
His son Francis Wayland III (1826-1904) was lieutenant-governor of Connecticut from 1869–1870, and became a professor and Dean of the Yale Law School.

== Notes ==
Academic offices
Preceded by Asa Messer	President of Brown University; 1827–1855	Succeeded by Barnas Sears
