= TAPPI =

TAPPI logo

TAPPI is a registered not-for-profit, international Non-Governmental Organization of about 14,000 member engineers, scientists, managers, academics and others involved in the areas of pulp, and paper. In addition to pulp and paper, the TAPPI membership includes some allied areas of packaging (such as corrugated fiberboard, flexible packaging, lamination, adhesives, coatings and extrusion).

It was founded in 1915 as the Technical Association of the Pulp and Paper Industry.

TAPPI provides a forum for the professionals involved in the industry. It publishes articles, standards, and books, conducts events for peer-reviewed information relevant to the industry and offers scholarships.

Peer-reviewed journals published by TAPPI include:

- Journal of Pulp and Paper Science
- TAPPI Journal
- until 2018 - The Journal of Engineered Fibers and Fabrics.

The TAPPI website serves as a focal point for the members' access to knowledge and networks. TAPPI also serves as a major contributor to world standards involving paper and is a member of ANSI (American National Standards Institute).
