= William Chaney =

American historian

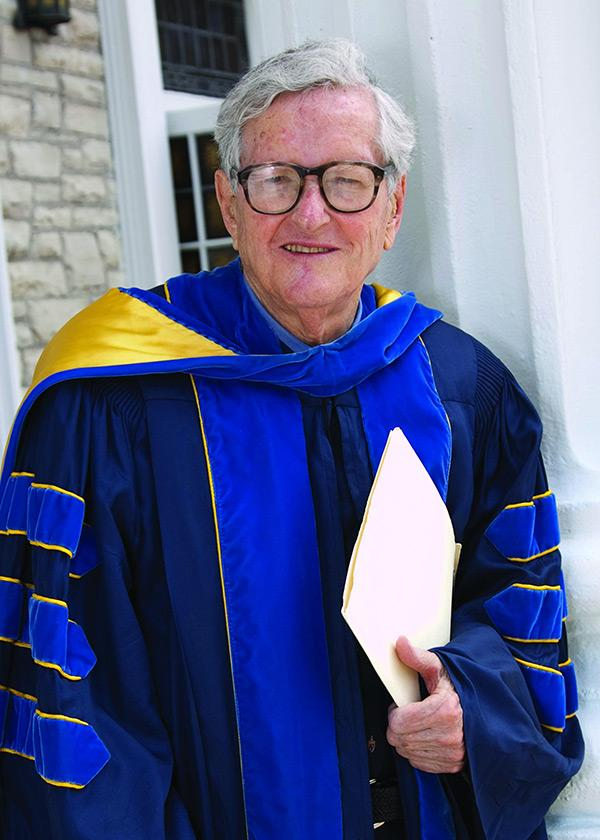
- Chaney in 2010
- Born: William Albert Chaney; December 23, 1922; Lodi, California, U.S.
- Died: March 13, 2013 (aged 90); Appleton, Wisconsin, U.S.
- Education: College of the Pacific; University of California, Berkeley (AB, PhD)
- Occupation: Historian
- Years active: 1952–2013
- Notable work: The Cult of Kingship in Anglo-Saxon England (registration required) (1970)

William Albert Chaney (December 23, 1922 – March 13, 2013) was an American historian of Anglo-Saxon England. Chaney spent his career at Lawrence University, where he taught from 1952 until his death; he held the George McKendree Steele endowed chair in history from 1962 until his official retirement in 1999, and was chair of the history department from 1968 to 1971. Chaney's studies focused on the conversion from paganism to Christianity and sacral kingship. His work culminated in his 1970 book, The Cult of Kingship in Anglo-Saxon England: The Transition from Paganism to Christianity.

Chaney was born in California and, at age 16, graduated from high school as valedictorian of his class. He completed both his Bachelor of Arts and Ph.D. at the University of California, Berkeley. Chaney was awarded two fellowships from Berkeley, and made a fellow of the Harvard Society of Fellows. The awards allowed him to spend time at Harvard and Princeton, and in Europe—the start to what would become 49 trips to the continent over the course of his career. As a 29 year old in 1952, Chaney began teaching at Lawrence. He said later that "I thought I would stay two or three years to see what a liberal arts college was like", but then "fell in love with the place", and never left.

Chaney was a popular presence on campus; he was Lawrence's second-longest-serving professor. A "Chaney course" was considered a rite of passage for many students, and, by the time of his retirement, 80% of all living alumni had passed through the college during his tenure. For more than four decades, Chaney hosted a "salon" three or four days a week at his apartment whereby students would gather for conversation and classical music. He was known as an engaging speaker, and gave scores of lectures at Lawrence and in the broader community.

== Early life and education ==
William Albert Chaney, who went by "Bill", was born in Lodi, California, on December 23, 1922. His mother, Esther Bowen Chaney, was from Ashland, Nebraska, and his father, Horace P. Chaney, from Monrovia, California. An older brother, Robert H. Chaney, was born in 1919. Their father died suddenly in 1925, when William Chaney was two years old, and his brother six. The brothers descended from what one colleague described as "southerners who had consistently backed the wrong horse in the great conflicts of American history"; during one conversation, when William Chaney asked his grandmother which president she was speaking of, she replied "Bill, you surely know that I'm talking about Jefferson Davis. He's the only president we've ever had."

Chaney later claimed that his interest in the Middle Ages started early in life, and that he was reading Walter Scott when his peers were reading children's books. (Note: In 1971 Lawrence would hold a Sir Walter Scott Festival; Chaney introduced the keynote speaker, Scott scholar Alexander Welsh.) He graduated as valedictorian of his class at Lodi Union High School in 1939, aged 16. After matriculating at the College of the Pacific he transferred to the University of California, Berkeley. He was admitted into the honor society Phi Beta Kappa as a senior, (Note: Shortly into his first term at Lawrence, Chaney co-hosted an initiation for new members of the society. In 1960, he delivered a lecture for the Phi Beta Kappa lecture series, inaugurated at the university in 1952, in 1969 he served as the series' coordinator, and in 1983 he delivered the lecture for the 30th anniversary of the series.) and completed his Bachelor of Arts in 1943, majoring in medieval history. Chaney then began working on his master's degree there while working as a teacher's assistant, and in 1944 was granted a fellowship in the history department.

In 1947, while working on his Ph.D. at Berkeley, Chaney was awarded the Sigmund Martin Heller traveling fellowship by the university, to spend a year working towards his degree at Harvard and Princeton Universities. His mother traveled with Chaney to Cambridge, where she spent the year; Chaney's brother was at Harvard Medical School at the time. In 1949, Chaney, having returned to live in Berkeley again, was made a fellow of the Harvard Society of Fellows. He was recommended for the fellowship by Maurice Bowra, whom Chaney had met while traveling in Europe on a Berkeley fellowship. The distinction came with three years of room and board, along with traveling expenses and $1,500 annually (equivalent to $20,000 in 2025). In September, Chaney left for Harvard, where he stayed at Dunster House.

Chaney ultimately completed his Ph.D. at Berkeley in 1951, under Ernst Kantorowicz's advisement. (Note: Kantorowicz would receive an honorary degree from Lawrence College in 1959.) His thesis was titled The Cult of Kingship in Anglo-Saxon England: The Transition from Paganism to Christianity.

== Career ==
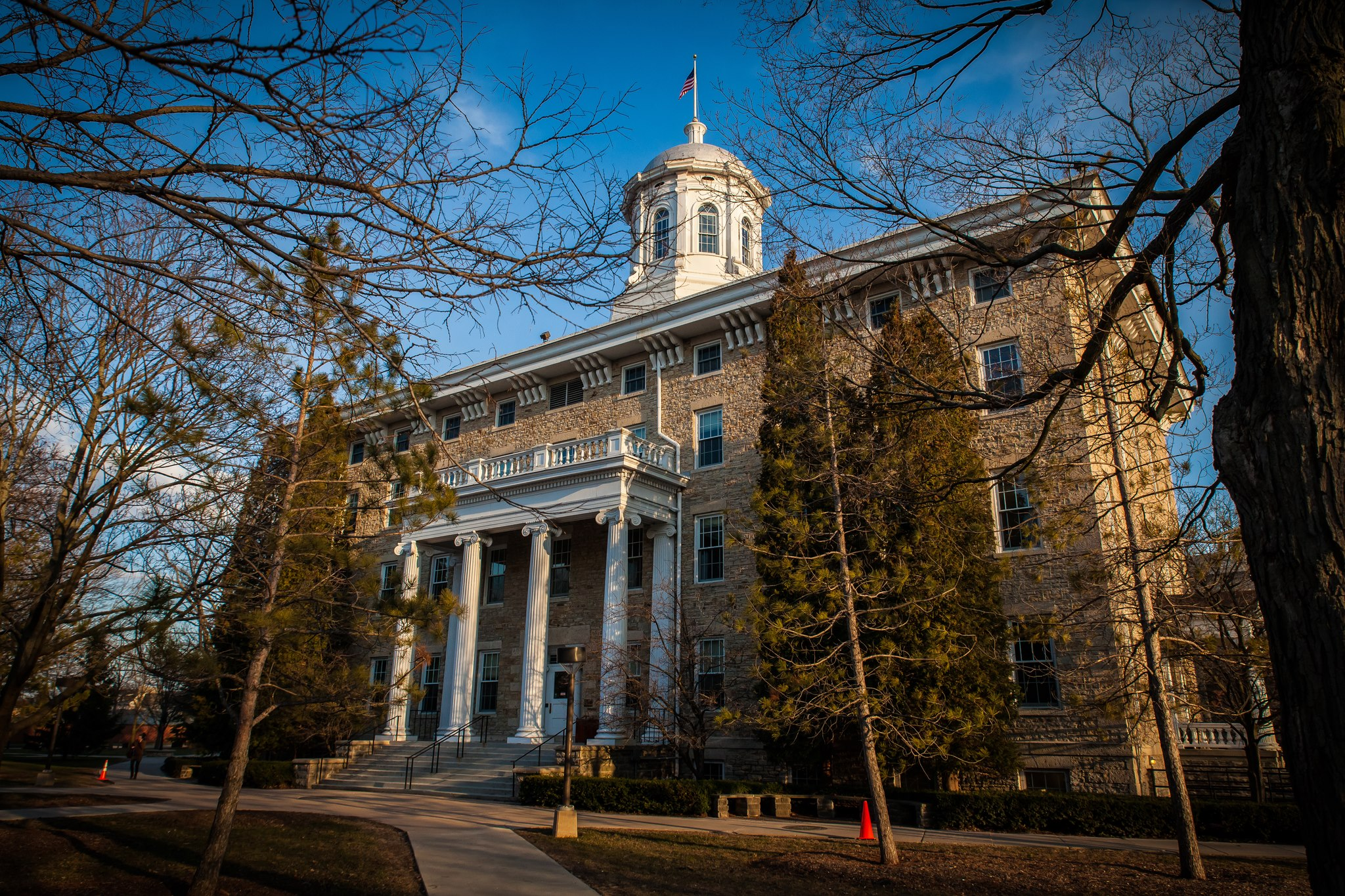
Main Hall, where Chaney maintained his third-floor corner office

In 1952, Chaney was appointed to a post at Lawrence University (then Lawrence College (Note: College became University in 1964, when Lawrence College consolidated with Milwaukee-Downer College. At the time, Chaney remarked "As Czar Nicholas II said when word was brought to him that the Revolution of 1905 had broken out in the capital, 'Dear Me! What interesting times we live in!' As a member of the faculty, I am grateful for the increased opportunities this presents to Lawrence College to continue its major task. It is an historic milestone which allows both distinguished advance to Lawrence and continuity to Milwaukee-Downer's own educational role.")) in Appleton, Wisconsin. He started in the fall term, with his mother again coming along and living with him, and soon began greeting new students in turn. In 1954, Chaney started teaching the course "a history of western civilization", and organized a four-day medieval festival at the college, which included two lectures by him. Starting in 1956, Chaney became the college's representative for the Woodrow Wilson National Fellowship Foundation, which sought to recruit promising college graduates for academic careers. (Note: By 1968, the university had produced 51 winners and 19 honorable mentions.) He also became the representative of the Rhodes Scholarship program at Lawrence. Chaney was promoted to associate professor in June 1958, and spent that summer as a visiting professor at Michigan State University. During a leave of absence from 1959 to 1960, Chaney spent 15 months in Europe—mostly at Oxford, with further time spent consulting manuscripts at Cambridge, the British Museum, and church and library archives throughout Britain, Heidelberg, Vienna, Spain, and Greece. Chaney was named the George McKendree Steele endowed chair in history in 1962, and made a full professor in May 1966. He took another sabbatical leave of absence from 1966 to 1967, (Note: As a "native Californian", Chaney said that he took all of his sabbaticals over the winter term, so he could "flee".) with a grant from the American Council of Learned Societies, to work at Oxford; much of his time was spent at the Bodleian Library, where he conducted research in support of a forthcoming book, provisionally entitled "Medieval Kingship". From 1968 to 1971 Chaney was the chair of the history department, then from 1971 to 1972 spent a year abroad at Lawrence's London Centre, which had been opened the year before. He spent two more years there over the course of his career: from 1986 to 1987, and 1992 to 1993. (Note: One assignment that Chaney would give, a student later recalled, was to pick a town, and write about its history without using a library. "Chaney said if one really wanted to learn the history of a place, then talk with the ladies that put the flowers on the altar of the local church. Of course, he was right." "Chaney's genius was to get students out into the community, meeting English people and experiencing their society.")

Chaney's primary research topic was Anglo-Saxon England, particularly the conversion from paganism to Christianity, and sacral kingship. Over the course of his career he took 49 trips to Europe, and by 1985, he claimed to have spent twice as much time at Oxford as an undergraduate. (Note: By February 1962, Chaney had made four research trips to Europe and spent significant time at Oxford, including a June 14 to September 1, 1956, trip—traveling on the SS Ryndam and SS Nieuw Amsterdam—where he attended the Three Choirs Festival and the Canterbury Festival, and his 1959–1960 leave of absence spent in England, Spain, and Greece. He made another trip that summer, and made his tenth trip to Oxford for his 1966–1967 leave of absence. Another trip was made in the summer of 1985, in addition to Chaney's 1971 to 1972, 1986 to 1987, and 1992 to 1993, stints at the London Centre. Chaney made another trip to England, his 32nd, in 1997. Chaney wished to make one more trip to make an even 50, but was prevented by failing health; he began to subscribe to rambling magazines instead, reading the descriptions as if going for walks in the English countryside in his mind. Chaney came to know Kallistos Ware through his time at Oxford, and in 1998 arranged for him to speak at Lawrence.) This research culminated in his 1970 book The Cult of Kingship in Anglo-Saxon England: The Transition from Paganism to Christianity. (Note: Though the book was published in 1970, Chaney had been working on it for some time; in 1962, the Oshkosh Daily Northwestern and the Twin City News-Record reported that Chaney "has just finished a book on Anglo-Saxon kingship". Excerpts from the book were also reprinted in 1979.) Chaney published many other works, including the widely cited 1962 article Grendel and the Gifstol: a Legal View of Monsters. He also gave numerous lectures, including throughout the wider community; The Oshkosh Northwestern termed him a "personable speaker" who was "well known throughout the Fox River Valley", and the Twin City News-Record described him as "[a] popular speaker ... because of his spritel[y] presentation of what could be boring facts of ancient history."

Chaney was a popular presence on campus, and an institution; one of the school's deans stated that 30% of its students considered a "Chaney course" to be a "must", and, by the time of his retirement, 80% of all living alumni had passed through the college during his tenure. A gifted and lively lecturer, Chaney was also readily available to his students, including after graduation. Commenting that upon arriving at Lawrence in 1952 "I thought I would stay two or three years to see what a liberal arts college was like", Chaney said he "fell in love with the place. There was such a sense of community." Starting in the late 1950s and lasting for more than 40 years, Chaney hosted a "salon" at his apartment, just off campus, three or four days a week; students would gather for conversation, classical music, and—depending on age—cream sherry or Dr Pepper. (Note: Chaney co-hosted the salon with Elisabeth Koffka, until her 1968 retirement. Koffka came up with the name "salon", which Chaney called an "unfortunate name, I think, because it sounds so pretentious".) He guided many students to graduate school, whether in history or other subjects, and stayed in touch with them—if largely by letter, as Chaney, who self-deprecatingly referred to himself as a "wave of the past", was by 1996 one of only two Lawrence professors who still lacked a computer in his office. Chaney would also teach courses geared towards adults, including summer seminars—such as on "The Vikings", "Viking Sagas", or "King Arthur's Britain", that were open to anyone aged 18 or older—as well as similar courses during a summer program known as Elderhostel, and several seminars, such as "The Arts as a Mirror of Society" and "King Arthur's Britain", taught during the school year.

In May 1995, former students planted the "Chaney Oak", a tree from England, in sight of Chaney's corner office on the third floor of Main Hall. Two years later, Chaney marked his 45th year at Lawrence, surpassing the record held by Hiram A. Jones, who taught Latin at the university from 1854 until dying in his classroom in 1898; the university declared a "Chaney Day", and rang the Main Hall bell 45 times.

Chaney officially retired on July 13, 1999, the day Lawrence marked its 150th commencement ceremony, and was awarded an honorary Master of Arts, ad eundem—turning the tables on Chaney, who as faculty marshal was typically the one to hood those awarded honorary degrees. (Note: Chaney had become faculty marshal for convocation by 1976.) He delivered a lecture entitled "Last Words", on the topic "If you were to give a final message to the students, what would you say?" Chaney continued to teach two courses a year, however, to maintain his Main Hall office, and to take annual research trips to England, Malta, and Greece. "I don't look at it as stopping what I'm doing", Chaney said at the time. "I look at it as continuing but having more time for other aspects. I'll take off my lecturing hat and put on my research/publishing hat." In 2002 he sat for a recorded interview with two students from the class of 1957, with excerpts published in Lawrence's magazine, and the tapes and transcriptions placed in the university's archives.

== Honors ==
From 1962 to 1999 Chaney held the George McKendree Steele endowed chair in history, and from 1968 to 1971 he was the chair of the history department. He was appointed a Fellow of the Royal Society of Arts in 1977, and was affiliated with the American Historical Association, the Modern Language Association, the American Society of Church History, the Conference on British Studies, the American Association of University Professors, and Phi Beta Kappa. In 1966–1967 was made a grantee in the American Council of Learned Societies, and in 1971 he was named an Outstanding Educator of America. In 1973, he was awarded the Edward and Rosa Uhrig Award for Excellent Teaching, given to a Lawrence faculty member "to give tangible recognition of outstanding performance in the actual teaching process, and for leadership in the quest to insure that students reach their full development as individual human beings and as future leaders of our society". Shortly before his retirement, Chaney was named to "Who's Who Among America's Teachers, 1998". On his 88th birthday, the university established the "William A. Chaney Fund for Excellence in History", with grants to students pursuing significant research.

=== William A. Chaney Lectureship ===
In 2002, Lawrence University began the William A. Chaney Lectureship series, honoring Chaney's retirement by hosting speakers in the humanities to talk on areas, such as medieval history, art history, and musicology and poetry, that Chaney was interested in. The following chart contains a partial list of these lectures.

Date	Speaker	Lecture	Ref
2002 (October 23)	Giles Constable	"Women and Religious Life in the Twelfth Century"	
2004 (May 27)	Jeffrey Hamburger	"The Medieval Work of Art: Wherein the 'Work'? Wherein the 'Art'?"	
2005 (October 20)	Lawrence Nees	"The Career of Godescalc, Artist at the Court of Charlemagne"	
2008 (April 16)	Susan McClary	"The Dragon Cart: The Femme-Fatale in 17th-Century French Opera"	
2010 (October 19)	Jane Tibbetts Schulenburg	"Female Piety, Relics and Sacred Space ca. 500–1150"	
2012 (November 9)	Keith Michael Baker	"Jean-Paul Marat: Prophet of Terror"	
2017 (January 11)	Anne Harris	"Entangled Ecologies: Community, Identity and the Modern Future of the Medieval Past"	
2018 (February 8)	Edgar Francis	"How to Study a Magic Book (When You Didn't Get into Hogwarts)"	

== Personal life ==
Chaney once described his political views as "a cross between divine right monarchist and libertarian". Though not politically active, Chaney made an exception during the Vietnam War era to march in the streets, for what he termed "the only time in my life". He loved classical music, and would joke that he did not like anything written after 1791. Chaney incorporated classical music into the salon he hosted; loving the obscure and to teach students to think outside the box, he enjoyed playing works by composers such as Johann Sebastian Bach's lesser-known son, Johann Christian Bach, and what Chaney termed "the three great Ks"—Koželuch, Kuhlau, and Krumpholz—a riff on "the three great Bs". (Note: Chaney also participated in musical events in the area, such as reading lessons as part of the "Festival of Nine Lessons and Carols", narrating the Lawrence's Concert Choir and Chamber Singers' concert, "The British are Coming", and featuring in a performance preview by the medieval vocal group Anonymous 4.)

Chaney never married. He had a cat, named Grendel, which he described as "the most pampered cat in town". When Grendel once ran away when a cat-sitting student left the door open, Chaney, a colleague later recalled, spent "a small fortune" taking out ads in The Post-Crescent; the ads offered an "[i]ncredibly vast reward" for her return. After nearly a year passed and Chaney had given up hope, he returned to his house to find Grendel awaiting him.

Chaney died on March 13, 2013, at his home in Appleton, Wisconsin—215 East Kimball Street, which he had rented for 60 years. Lawrence University held a memorial service for Chaney at its Memorial Chapel on May 18.

== Publications ==
In addition to his book The Cult of Kingship in Anglo-Saxon England, Chaney wrote numerous journal articles, reviews, and encyclopedia articles, including eleven articles in the New Catholic Encyclopedia alone. Chaney's output measured more than 100 publications by 1985; by his death these included more than 70 articles and 25 reviews.

=== Books ===
- Chaney, William A. (1970). The Cult of Kingship in Anglo-Saxon England: The Transition from Paganism to Christianity. Manchester: Manchester University Press.

- Excepts published as Chaney, William A. (1979). "The Conversion of the Germans". In Chodorow, Stanley (ed.). The Other Side of Western Civilization: Readings in Everyday Life. Vol. I (2nd ed.). New York: Harcourt Brace Jovanovich, Inc. pp. 62–69. ISBN 0-15-567648-2. LCCN 78-60215.

=== Articles ===
- Chaney, William A. (1959). "The Historical Development of Secular Educational Philosophy With an Apology for Its Use in the Present Day". Papers and Studies – the Institute for Christian Learning. 2. Evanston, Illinois: Christ the King Foundation: 3–14. ISSN 0443-3351.
- ——— (July 1960). "Paganism to Christianity in Anglo-Saxon England". Harvard Theological Review. LIII (3). Cambridge, Massachusetts: Harvard University Press: 197–217. doi:10.1017/S0017816000027012. S2CID 162030224.
- ——— (April 1962a). "Aethelberht's Code and the King's Number". The American Journal of Legal History. 6 (2). Philadelphia, Pennsylvania: American Society for Legal History: 151–177. doi:10.2307/844151. JSTOR 4230655.
- ——— (Spring 1962b). "A Louisiana Planter in the Gold Rush". Louisiana History. III (2). Baton Rouge, Louisiana: Louisiana Historical Association: 133–144. JSTOR 4230655.
- ——— (December 1962c). "Grendel and the Gifstol: A Legal View of Monsters". PMLA. LXXVII (5). Modern Language Association: 513–520. doi:10.2307/460400. JSTOR 460400. S2CID 163473440.
- ——— (September 1963). "Anglo-Saxon Church Dues: A Study in Historical Continuity". Church History. XXXII (3). American Society of Church History: 268–277. doi:10.2307/3162773. JSTOR 3162773. S2CID 162622763.
- ——— (May 1965). "The Economics of Ruler-Cult in Anglo-Saxon Law". The Journal of British Studies. IV (2). Hartford, Connecticut: The Conference on British Studies: 1–17. doi:10.1086/385497. JSTOR 175143. S2CID 145342583.
- ——— (Autumn 1967). "The Royal Role in the Conversion of England". A Journal of Church and State. IX (3). J. M. Dawson Studies in Church and State of Baylor University: 317–331. doi:10.1093/jcs/9.3.317. JSTOR 23913732.

=== Reviews ===
- Chaney, William A. (January 1964). "Review of The Festival of Lughnasa: A Study of the Survival of the Celtic Festival of the Beginning of Harvest, by Máire MacNeill". Speculum. XXXIX (1). The Mediaeval Academy of America: 188–191. doi:10.2307/2850164. JSTOR 2850164.
- ——— (January 1966). "Review of Myth and Religion of the North: The Religion of Ancient Scandinavia, by E. O. G. Turville-Petre". Speculum. XLI (1). The Mediaeval Academy of America: 183–186. doi:10.2307/2851891. JSTOR 2851891.
- ——— (January 1966). "Review of The Fifth-Century Invasions South of the Thames, by Vera I. Evison". The American Historical Review. LXXI (2). American Historical Association: 528–530. doi:10.1086/ahr/71.2.528-a.
- ——— (January 1967). "Review of Old Ireland, edited by Robert McNally". The American Historical Review. LXXII (2). American Historical Association: 593–594. doi:10.1086/ahr/72.2.593.
- ——— (October 1967). "Review of The Church in Early Irish Society, by Kathleen Hughes". The American Historical Review. LXXIII (1). American Historical Association: 113–114. doi:10.1086/ahr/73.1.113.
- ——— (January 1968). "Review of The Guilt of the Templars, edited by Gershon Legman". Speculum. XLIII (1). The Mediaeval Academy of America: 174–176. doi:10.2307/2854828. JSTOR 2847623.
- ——— (February 1969). "Review of A History of Anglo-Latin Literature, 597–1066. Volume I, 597–740, by W. F. Bolton". The American Historical Review. LXXIV (3). American Historical Association: 962–963. doi:10.1086/ahr/74.3.962.
- ——— (April 1969). "Review of The Picts, by Isabel Henderson". Speculum. XLIV (2). The Mediaeval Academy of America: 295–298. doi:10.2307/2847623. JSTOR 2847623.
- ——— (February 1970). "Review of King Alfred & Boethius: An Analysis of the Old English Version of the Consolation of Philosophy, by F. Anne Payne". The American Historical Review. LXXV (3). American Historical Association: 830. doi:10.1086/ahr/75.3.830.
- ——— (December 1970). "Review of Bede's Ecclesiastical History of the English People, edited by Bertram Colgrave and R. A. B. Mynors". The American Historical Review. LXXV (7). American Historical Association: 2027. doi:10.1086/ahr/75.7.2027.
- ——— (January 1971). "Review of Arthur and his Time: Britain in the Dark Ages, by Jack Lindsay". Archaeology. 24 (1). New York: Archaeological Institute of America: 86, 88. JSTOR 41674267.
- ——— (September 1972). "Review of Edward the Confessor, by Frank Barlow". The Annals of the American Academy of Political and Social Science. 403. The American Academy of Political and Social Science: 185–186. doi:10.1177/000271627240300138. JSTOR 1039511. LCCN 72-85688. S2CID 143935359.
- ——— (September 1973). "Review of Law and Society in the Visigothic Kingdom, by P. D. King". Church History. 42 (3). American Society of Church History: 422–423. doi:10.2307/3164406. JSTOR 3164406. S2CID 162009490.
- ——— (September 1973). "Review of Church and State in the Middle Ages, by Bennett D. Hill". Church History. 42 (3). American Society of Church History: 424. doi:10.2307/3164408. JSTOR 3164408. S2CID 162329443.
- ——— (October 1974). "Review of The Coming of Christianity to England, by Henry Mayr-Harting". The Catholic Historical Review. LX (3). American Catholic Historical Association: 475–476. JSTOR 25019599.
- ——— (January 1975). "Review of Early Germanic Kingship in England and on the Continent by J. M. Wallace-Hadrill". Speculum. L (1). The Mediaeval Academy of America: 163–167. doi:10.2307/2856540. JSTOR 2856540.
- ——— (April 1975). "Review of Königsgedanke und Königtum bei den Angelsachsen: Bis zur Mitte des 9. Jahrhunderts, by Hanna Vollrath-Reichelt". The American Historical Review. 80 (2). American Historical Association: 381–382. doi:10.1086/ahr/80.2.381-a.
- ——— (October 1977). "Review of Die heiligen Könige bei den Angelsachsen und den skandinavischen Völkern. Königsheiliger und Königshaus, by Erich Hoffmann". Speculum. LII (4). The Mediaeval Academy of America: 991–993. doi:10.2307/2855424. JSTOR 2855424.
- ——— (April 1978). "Review of Northumbria in the Days of Bede, by Peter Hunter Blair". The Catholic Historical Review. LXIV (2). American Catholic Historical Association: 259–260. JSTOR 25020321.
- ——— (March 1980). "Review of Anglo-Saxon England 7, edited by Peter Clemoes". Church History. 49 (1). American Society of Church History: 101. doi:10.2307/3164667. JSTOR 3164667. S2CID 162489588.
- ——— (December 1980). "Review of Anglo-Saxon England 8, edited by Peter Clemoes". Church History. 49 (4). American Society of Church History: 483–484. doi:10.2307/3164860. JSTOR 3164860. S2CID 162940662.
- ——— (October 1982). "Review of Rites and Religions of the Anglo-Saxons, by Gale R. Owen". The American Historical Review. 87 (4). American Historical Association: 1068. doi:10.1086/ahr/87.4.1068.
- ——— (April 1984). "Review of The Literature of Penance in Anglo-Saxon England, by Allen J. Frantzen". The American Historical Review. 89 (2). American Historical Association: 417–418. doi:10.1086/ahr/89.2.417.
- ——— (April 1985). "Review of The Governance of Anglo-Saxon England, 500–1087, by H. R. Loyn". The American Historical Review. 90 (2). American Historical Association: 399–400. doi:10.1086/ahr/90.2.399-a.
- ——— (June 1986). "Review of Gildas: New Approaches, edited by Michael Lapidge and David Dumville". The American Historical Review. 91 (3). American Historical Association: 641–642. doi:10.1086/ahr/91.3.641-a.
- ——— (June 1988). "Review of The Origins of England, 410–600, by Martyn J. Whittock". The American Historical Review. 93 (3). American Historical Association: 676–677. doi:10.1086/ahr/93.3.676.
- ——— (Winter 1990). "Review of Migration and Mythmaking in Anglo-Saxon England, by Nicholas Howe". Albion. 22 (4). North American Conference on British Studies: 655–656. doi:10.2307/4051394. JSTOR 4051394.
- ——— (July 1991). "Review of The Royal Saints of Anglo-Saxon England: A Study of West Saxon and East Anglian Cults, by Susan J. Ridyard". Speculum. 66 (3). The Medieval Academy of America: 684–686. doi:10.2307/2864277. JSTOR 2864277.
- ——— (April 1996). "Review of Conquest, Anarchy, and Lordship: Yorkshire, 1066–1154, by Paul Dalton". The American Historical Review. 101 (2). American Historical Association: 468. doi:10.1086/ahr/101.2.468.
- ——— (January 1997). "Review of The Waltham Chronicle: An Account of the Discovery of Our Holy Cross at Montacute and Its Conveyance to Waltham, edited by Leslie Watkiss and Marjorie Chibnall". Speculum. 72 (1). The Medieval Academy of America: 237–238. doi:10.2307/2865945. JSTOR 2865945.
- ——— (June 1997). "Review of Bede: On the Temple, by Seán Connolly". Church History. 66 (2). American Society of Church History: 324. doi:10.2307/3170675. JSTOR 3170675. S2CID 161353977.
- ——— (June 1997). "Review of The Living Stream: Holy Wells in Historical Context, by James Rattue". Church History. 66 (2). American Society of Church History: 431–432. doi:10.2307/3170752. JSTOR 3170752. S2CID 161189929.
- ——— (Spring 2001). "Review of Restoration and Reform 1153–1165: Recovery from Civil War in England, by Graeme J. White". The Journal of Interdisciplinary History. XXXI (4). MIT Press: 624–625. doi:10.1162/jinh.2001.31.4.624. JSTOR 206868. S2CID 142232431.

=== Other ===
- Chaney, William A. (March 28, 1966). "Dr. Chaney's Lecture". People's Forum. Green Bay Press-Gazette. Vol. LI, no. 270. Green Bay, Wisconsin. p. 4 – via Newspapers.com.

- Response to Abel, Barbara (March 13, 1966). "Catholic-Run Schools Termed 'Second Rate'". Green Bay Press-Gazette. Vol. LI, no. 255. Green Bay, Wisconsin. p. A-3 – via Newspapers.com.; and to Keefe, Anselm M. (March 21, 1966). "Religion and Science". People's Forum. Green Bay Press-Gazette. Vol. LI, no. 263. Green Bay, Wisconsin. p. 4 – via Newspapers.com.. See also Long, Brideen (March 24, 1966). "Religion and Teaching". People's Forum. Green Bay Press-Gazette. Vol. LI, no. 266. Green Bay, Wisconsin. p. 4 – via Newspapers.com..

- ——— (1959). "Eighth Century". The Encyclopedia Americana. Vol. X. New York: Americana Corporation. pp. 36–39. LCCN 59-6519.

- Published in subsequent (and possibly earlier) editions, such as ——— (2005). "Eighth Century". Encyclopedia Americana. Vol. 10 (International ed.). Danbury, Connecticut: Scholastic Library Publishing, Inc. pp. 84–87. ISBN 0-7172-0138-4.

- ——— (1981). "Eric the Red". The World Book Encyclopedia. Vol. 6. Chicago: World Book–Childcraft International, Inc. p. 270. ISBN 0-7166-0081-1. LCCN 80-50324.

- Published in subsequent (and possibly earlier) editions, such as ——— (1994). "Eric the Red". The World Book Encyclopedia. Vol. 6. Chicago: World Book, Inc. p. 350. ISBN 0-7166-0094-3. LCCN 93-60768.

- Whitelock, Dorothy & Chaney, William A. (2003). "United Kingdom: Anglo-Saxon England". The New Encyclopaedia Britannica. The New Encyclopedia Britannica. Vol. 29 (15th ed.). Chicago: Encyclopædia Britannica, Inc. pp. 28–34. ISBN 0-85229-961-3. LCCN 2002113989.

- Published in subsequent (and possibly earlier) editions, such as Whitelock, Dorothy & Chaney, William A. (2007). "United Kingdom: Anglo-Saxon England". The New Encyclopaedia Britannica. The New Encyclopedia Britannica. Vol. 29 (15th ed.). Chicago: Encyclopædia Britannica, Inc. pp. 28–34. ISBN 978-1-59339-292-5. LCCN 2006921233.

- Chaney, William A. (2003). "Aelfric Grammaticus". In Marthaler, Berard (ed.). New Catholic Encyclopedia: Baa-Cam. New Catholic Encyclopedia. Vol. 1 (2nd ed.). Detroit, Michigan: Thomson Gale. p. 136. ISBN 0-7876-4005-0.
- ——— (2003). "Aelfric of Canterbury, St.". In Marthaler, Berard (ed.). New Catholic Encyclopedia: Baa-Cam. New Catholic Encyclopedia. Vol. 1 (2nd ed.). Detroit, Michigan: Thomson Gale. pp. 136–137. ISBN 0-7876-4005-0.
- ——— (2003). "Alphege of Winchester, St.". In Marthaler, Berard (ed.). New Catholic Encyclopedia: Baa-Cam. New Catholic Encyclopedia. Vol. 1 (2nd ed.). Detroit, Michigan: Thomson Gale. pp. 306–307. ISBN 0-7876-4005-0.
- ——— (2003). "Ealdred (Aldred) of York". In Marthaler, Berard (ed.). New Catholic Encyclopedia: Ead-Fre. New Catholic Encyclopedia. Vol. 5 (2nd ed.). Detroit, Michigan: Thomson Gale. p. 1. ISBN 0-7876-4009-3.
- ——— (2003). "Ethelhard (Aethelheard) of Canterbury". In Marthaler, Berard (ed.). New Catholic Encyclopedia: Ead-Fre. New Catholic Encyclopedia. Vol. 5 (2nd ed.). Detroit, Michigan: Thomson Gale. p. 386. ISBN 0-7876-4009-3.
- ——— (2003). "Ethelnoth of Canterbury, St.". In Marthaler, Berard (ed.). New Catholic Encyclopedia: Ead-Fre. New Catholic Encyclopedia. Vol. 5 (2nd ed.). Detroit, Michigan: Thomson Gale. pp. 386–387. ISBN 0-7876-4009-3.
- ——— (2003). "Ethelwold of Winchester, St.". In Marthaler, Berard (ed.). New Catholic Encyclopedia: Ead-Fre. New Catholic Encyclopedia. Vol. 5 (2nd ed.). Detroit, Michigan: Thomson Gale. pp. 387–388. ISBN 0-7876-4009-3.
- ——— (2003). "Grimbald, St.". In Marthaler, Berard (ed.). New Catholic Encyclopedia: Fri-Hoh. New Catholic Encyclopedia. Vol. 6 (2nd ed.). Detroit, Michigan: Thomson Gale. pp. 533–534. ISBN 0-7876-4010-7.
- ——— (2003). "Oswald of York, St.". In Marthaler, Berard (ed.). New Catholic Encyclopedia. Vol. 10 (2nd ed.). Detroit, Michigan: Thomson Gale. p. 708. ISBN 0-7876-4014-X.
- ——— (2003). "Plegmund of Canterbury". In Marthaler, Berard (ed.). New Catholic Encyclopedia: Pau-Red. New Catholic Encyclopedia. Vol. 11 (2nd ed.). Detroit, Michigan: Thomson Gale. pp. 418–419. ISBN 0-7876-4015-8.
- ——— (2003). "Whitby, Abbey of". In Marthaler, Berard (ed.). New Catholic Encyclopedia: Thi-Zwi. New Catholic Encyclopedia. Vol. 14 (2nd ed.). Detroit, Michigan: Thomson Gale. pp. 699–701. ISBN 0-7876-4018-2.

== Bibliography ==
- Chaney, William A. (May 18, 2010). William Chaney – A Lawrence Legacy. Lawrence University.
- "Degrees Conferred: The Degree of Doctor of Philosophy Upon". The Ninety-Ninth Commencement. Berkeley, California: University of California, Berkeley. 1962. pp. 21–27.
- "Fellowships and Graduate Scholarships 1947–1948". University of California Register, 1946–1947, with Announcements for 1947–1948. Vol. II. Berkeley, California: University of California Press. 1948. pp. 119–127.
- Harris, Christine, ed. (2012). The Ruby Jubilee Chronicle: Forty Years of Lawrence University London Centre Memories. Appleton, Wisconsin: Lawrence University.
- Mayr-Harting, Henry (2013). "Letter from Henry Mayr-Harting". Lawrence University.
- "Memorial Tributes: Professor William A. Chaney" (PDF). Lawrence University. May 18, 2013.
- Professor William A. Chaney Memorial – May 18, 2013. Lawrence University. May 18, 2010.
- Spear, David S.; Schulenburg, Jane Tibbetts & Hittle, Michael (November 2013). "In Memoriam: William A. Chaney (1922–2013)". Perspectives on History. American Historical Association.
