= Richard Warch =

American minister and academic (1939–2013)

Richard March
- Born: August 4, 1939
- Died: September 14, 2013 (aged 74)
- Other names: Rik
- Years active: 1968-2004
- Known for: 14th President of Lawrence University

Richard Warch (August 4, 1939 – September 14, 2013) was an American professor, ordained minister and academic. He served as the 14th president of Lawrence University.

== Early life ==
Warch was raised in Ho-Ho-Kus, New Jersey. He received his bachelor's degree in history from Williams College in 1961. He studied theology at the University of Edinburgh in Scotland and earned a Bachelor of Divinity degree from the Yale Divinity School in 1964 and a Ph.D. in American studies from Yale University in 1968.

== Career ==
From 1968 to 1977, Warch was a member of the faculty in the history and American studies departments at Yale University, and served as associate dean in his last year.

In the fall of 1977, he served as vice president for academic affairs and professor of history at Lawrence University. He became president of the school in 1979.

In June 1999, Warch was named to the executive committee of the Annapolis Group, an association of more than 100 of America's leading liberal arts colleges. In the 1987 study, "The Effective College President," a two-year project funded by the Exxon Education Foundation, he was named one of the nation's top 100 college presidents.

He is the author of the book School of the Prophets: Yale College, 1710–1740, co-edited the volume John Brown in the Prentice-Hall Great Lives Observed Series, and has addressed a wide variety of issues facing higher education in numerous published articles, reviews, and commentaries.

His tenure as president at Lawrence University was marked by an improvement in the school's academic reputation, building projects, and an emphasis on the school's liberal arts tradition.

== Retirement ==
Warch retired from the office of president of Lawrence University effective July 1, 2004. After retirement, he and his wife, Margot, moved to Ellison Bay in Wisconsin's Door County. On September 14, 2013, Warch died of cancer.

Preceded by Thomas S. Smith	President of Lawrence University	Succeeded by Jill Beck
