= Laurie Carter =

University president

17th President of Lawrence University
- Incumbent
- Assumed office July 1, 2021
- Preceded by: Mark Burstein

17th President of Shippensburg University of Pennsylvania
- In office May 18, 2017 – June 30, 2021
- Preceded by: George Harpster
- Succeeded by: Charles Patterson

Personal details
- Education: Clarion University of Pennsylvania (BS); William Paterson University (MA); Rutgers University (JD)

Laurie Aleta Carter is the 17th president of Lawrence University, a position she began in July 2021. She is Lawrence University's first BIPOC president. She has also served as president of Shippensburg University of Pennsylvania.

== Early life and education ==
Carter grew up in Rutherford, New Jersey with a father who worked in a chemical plant and a mother who stayed home with Carter and her siblings. She graduated from Hackensack High School in 1980. She credits her mother, Harriet, with inspiring her interest in the arts. Carter received her undergraduate degree in communications from Clarion University of Pennsylvania, where she was captain of the track and field team. She went on to earn an M.A in communications from William Paterson University in 1987 and a J.D. from Rutgers University in 1993.

== Career ==
Carter began her career in higher education as a way to pay for graduate school. She worked as a residence hall director at William Paterson College and director of residence life at Fairleigh Dickinson College while studying for her master's degree.

Carter was hired to be the Director of Student affairs at the Juilliard School in 1988, and spent twenty-five years there eventually becoming their first chief legal officer. During her time there, she launched the school's legal department and jazz studies program, taught on the liberal arts and graduate faculty, launched diversity initiatives, and eventually attained the roles of Vice President and General Counsel.

In 2013, she left Juilliard for a position at The New Jersey Performing Arts Center where she remained until 2014. She went on to join Eastern Kentucky University as Executive Vice President and University Counsel in 2014. She was appointed President of Shippensburg University of Pennsylvania on May 18, 2017. Before leaving Shippensburg, she described herself as a "student centered president" who was proudest of how she led the university through the first year of the COVID-19 pandemic.

On March 4, 2021 it was announced that Carter would be taking over as president of Lawrence University; she is the first Black president of the university. She replaced Mark Burstein. She had also been a finalist in the 2021 search for a president at Ramapo College in New Jersey.

== Awards ==
Carter was presented with the Clarion University Distinguished Alumni Award in 2007, and was inducted into the Clarion University Hall of Fame in 2018. She was named one of 25 Outstanding Women in Higher Education by the magazine Diverse: Issues in Higher Education in 2021.

== Personal life ==
Carter is married to Gary Robinson, a police detective in the Bergen County, New Jersey prosecutor's office. The couple has one son.
