= Thomas S. Smith =

Thomas S. Smith may refer to:

- Thomas S. Smith (educator) (1921–2004), 13th president of Lawrence University
- Thomas S. Smith (politician) (1917–2002), American politician
- Thomas Sercombe Smith (1858–1937), British civil servant and judge
- Thomas Southwood Smith (1788–1861), English physician
