= Lawrence University =

Private college and conservatory in Appleton, Wisconsin, US

- Former names: Lawrence College (1913–1964); Lawrence Institute (1847–1849)
- Motto: Light! More Light! Veritas est lux.
- Motto in English: "Truth is Light"
- Type: Private liberal arts college
- Established: 1847; 179 years ago
- Academic affiliations: Oberlin Group; CLAC; Annapolis Group; Associated Colleges of the Midwest; Space-grant
- Endowment: $456.6 million (2025)
- President: Laurie Carter
- Students: 1,465 (fall 2023)
- Location: Appleton, Wisconsin, United States; 44°15′40″N 88°24′00″W
- Campus: Urban: 84 acres (34 ha) Björklunden: 425 acres (172 ha)
- Nickname: Vikings
- Sporting affiliations: NCAA Division III – Midwest Conference
- Website: lawrence.edu

Lawrence University is a private liberal arts college and conservatory of music in Appleton, Wisconsin, United States. Founded in 1847, its first classes were held on November 12, 1849. Lawrence was the second college in the U.S. to be founded as a coeducational institution.

== History ==
Lawrence's first president, William Harkness Sampson, founded the school with Henry R. Colman, using $10,000 provided by philanthropist Amos Adams Lawrence, and matched by the Methodist church. Both founders were ordained Methodist ministers, but Lawrence was Episcopalian. The school was originally named Lawrence Institute of Wisconsin in its 1847 charter from the Wisconsin Territorial Legislature, but the name was changed to Lawrence University before classes began in November 1849. Its oldest extant building, Main Hall, was built in 1853. Lawrence University was the second college to be founded as a coeducational institution in the country.

Lawrence's first period of major growth came during the thirty-year tenure (1894–1924) of alumnus Samuel G. Plantz as president, when the student body quadrupled, from 200 to 800.

From 1913 until 1964, it was named Lawrence College, to emphasize its small size and liberal arts education focus. The name returned to Lawrence University when it merged with Milwaukee-Downer College. The state of Wisconsin then purchased the Milwaukee-Downer property and buildings to expand the campus of the University of Wisconsin–Milwaukee. Initially, the university designated two entities: Lawrence College for Men and Downer College for Women. This separation has not lasted in any material form, though degrees are still conferred "on the recommendation of the Faculty of Lawrence and Downer Colleges" and the university by-laws still make the distinction. The traditions and heritage of Milwaukee-Downer are woven into the Appleton campus, from the grove of hawthorn trees (called Hawthornden) between Brokaw and Colman halls, to the sundial on the back of Main Hall, to the bestowing upon each class a class color and banner.

The Lawrence Conservatory of Music, usually referred to as "the Con", was founded in 1874. Lawrence offers three degrees: a Bachelor of Arts, a Bachelor of Music and a Bachelor of Musical Arts. It also offers a five-year dual degree program, where students can receive both B.A. and B.Mus. degrees.

The Institute of Paper Chemistry (later renamed the Institute of Paper Science and Technology) was founded in 1929 as a collaboration between the University and local paper manufacturers. The Institute, whose campus was built across from Lawrence's Alexander Gymnasium, offered master's and doctoral degrees. In 1989, the Institute moved to the Atlanta, Georgia campus of the Georgia Institute of Technology.

First-year Studies (formerly named Freshman Studies) at Lawrence is a mandatory one-term class, in which all students study the same selected 11 classic works of literature, art, and music, the list varying from year to year. President Nathan M. Pusey is credited with initiating the program in 1945, although Professor Waples chaired the Freshman Studies Committee and was responsible for implementing the program. The program continues to this day, despite being temporarily suspended in 1975 and shorted from two terms to one in 2024.

=== Presidents ===
- 1849–1853 William Harkness Sampson, principal
- 1853–1859 Edward Cooke
- 1859–1865 Russell Zelotes Mason
- 1865–1879 George McKendree Steele
- 1879–1889 Elias DeWitt Huntley
- 1883–1889 Bradford Paul Raymond
- 1889–1893 Charles Wesley Gallagher
- 1893–1894 L. Wesley Underwood, acting president
- 1894–1924 Samuel G. Plantz
- 1925–1937 Henry Merritt Wriston
- 1937–1943 Thomas Nichols Barrows
- 1944–1953 Nathan Marsh Pusey
- 1954–1963 Douglas Maitland Knight
- 1963–1969 Curtis William Tarr
- 1969–1979 Thomas S. Smith
- 1979–2004 Richard Warch
- 2004–2013 Jill Beck
- 2013–2021 Mark Burstein
- 2021–present Laurie Carter

== Campus ==
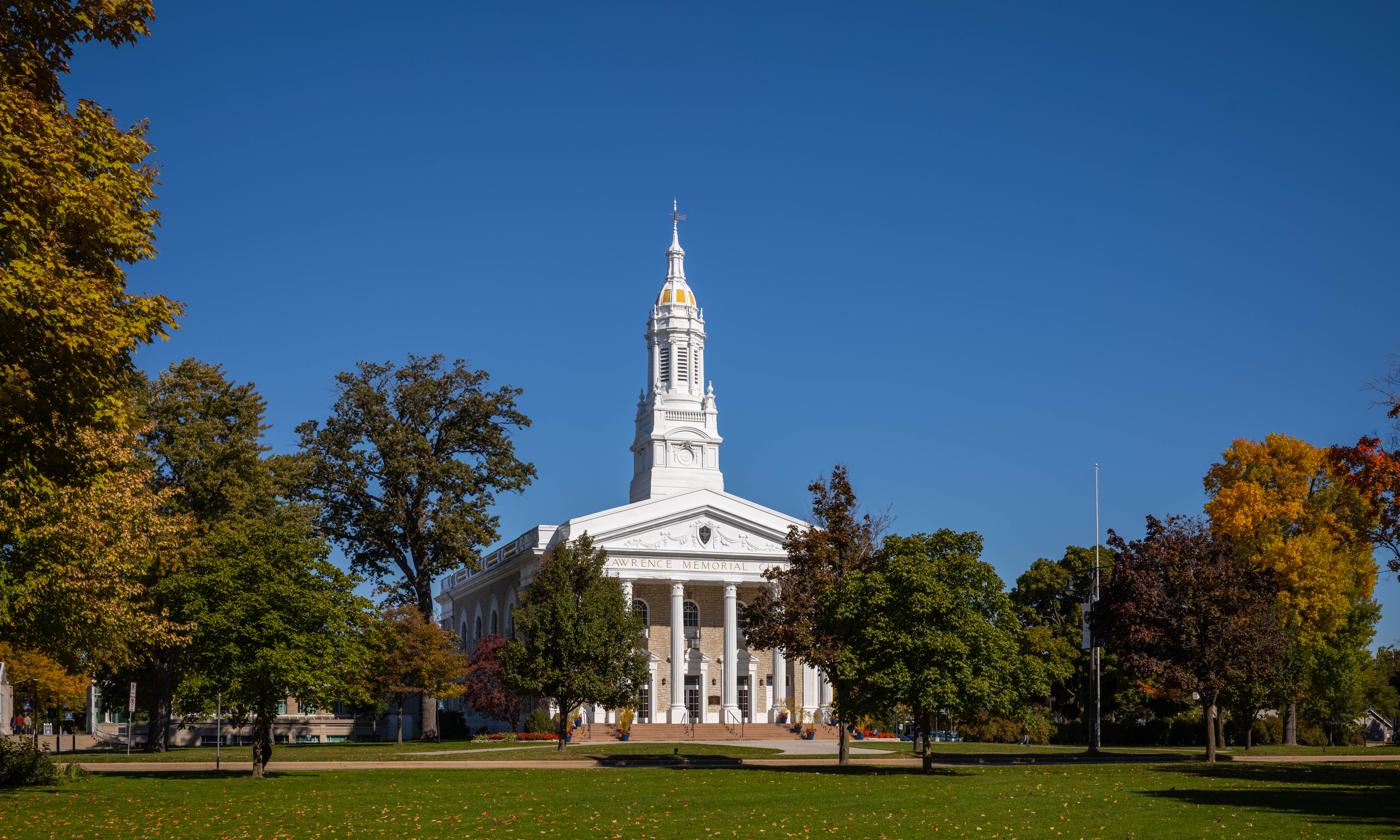
Lawrence University Memorial Chapel

The 84-acre (34 ha) campus is located in downtown Appleton, divided into two parts by the Fox River. The academic campus is on the north shore of the river, and the major athletic facilities (including the 5,000-seat Banta Bowl) are on the southeast shore. Lawrence also has a 425-acre (1.7 km^{2}) northern estate called Björklunden (full name: Björklunden vid sjön), which serves as a site for retreats, seminars, concerts, and theatrical performances. Donald and Winifred Boynton of Highland Park, Illinois, donated the property in Door County, Wisconsin to Lawrence in 1963.

In 2009, Lawrence opened the Richard and Margot Warch Campus Center, a gathering place for students, faculty, staff, alumni, and guests from the Fox Cities community. The 107,000-square-foot (9,900 m^{2}) building is situated on the Fox River on the site of the former Hulburt House.

== Academics ==
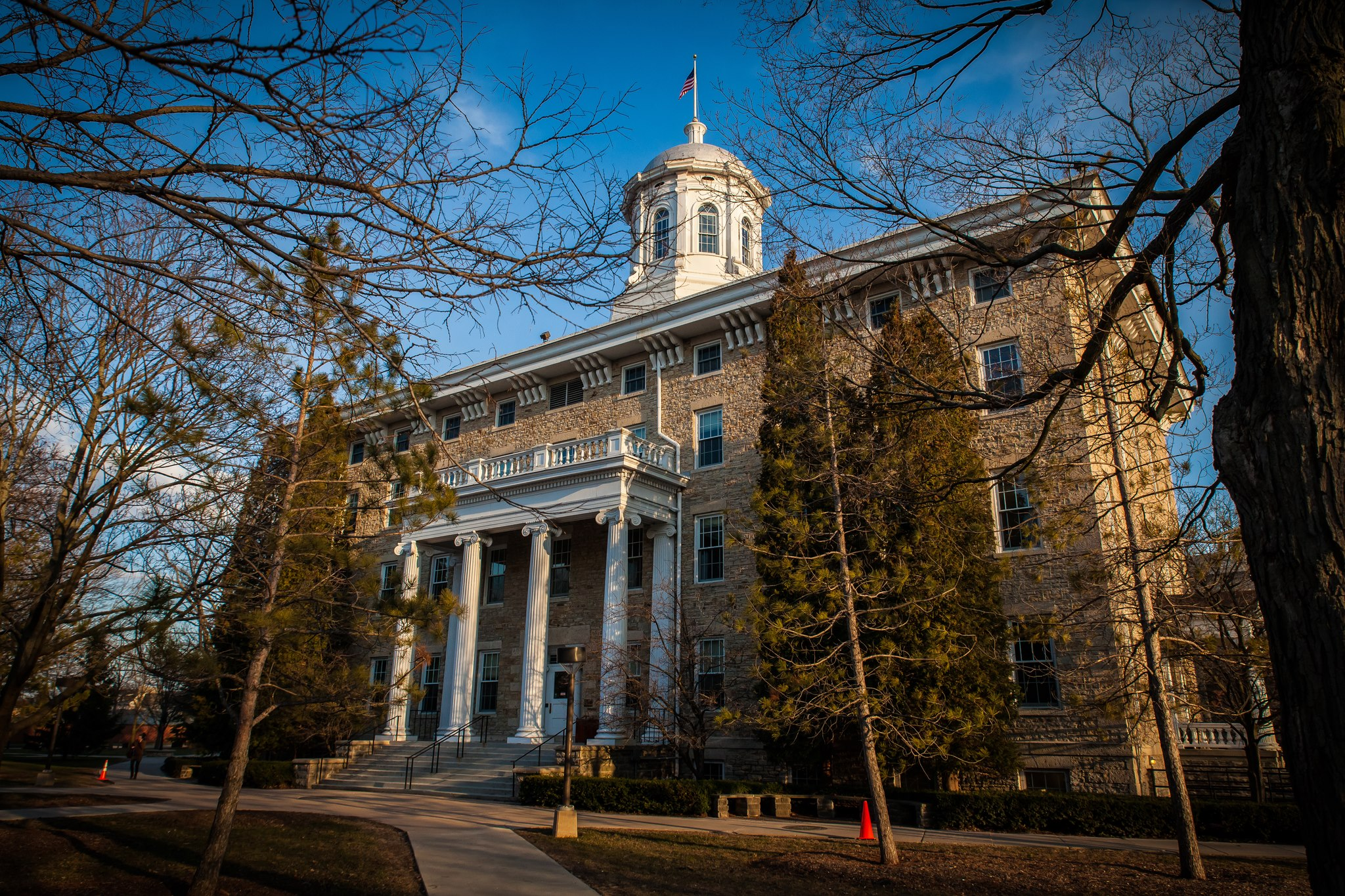
Main Hall, built in 1853, was the second building on the Lawrence campus and is listed on the National Register of Historic Places.

The student/faculty ratio at Lawrence is 9:1. The college offers majors in most of the liberal arts. The school also offers the option of interdisciplinary areas of study and allows students to design their own majors. Lawrence grants Bachelor of Arts and Bachelor of Music degrees, with a double degree possible. Lawrence offers a number of cooperative degree programs in areas such as engineering, health sciences and environmental studies.

All students are required to take First-Year Studies during their first trimester, which introduces students to broad areas of study and provides a common academic experience for the college. Known as Freshman Studies until 2021, the program was established in 1945, and aside from a brief interruption in the mid-1970s, it has remained a consistent fixture of the school's liberal arts curriculum. Lawrence's First-Year Studies program focuses on a mixture of Great Books and more contemporary, influential works, which include non-fiction books, fiction books, and various other types of works, such as paintings, photographs, musical recordings, and the periodic table of the elements. Readings are replaced every few years, with the exception of Plato's Republic, which was included in the list from 1945 until the program was revised in 2024.

=== Rankings and reputation ===
In the 2025 U.S. News & World Report college rankings, Lawrence University was ranked 69th (tied) of 211 liberal arts colleges nationwide. Lawrence was ranked 85th in the national liberal arts colleges and 12th in Pell Grant performance in Washington Monthly's rankings in 2024.

== Student life ==
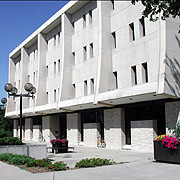
Seeley G. Mudd Library

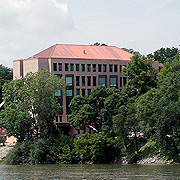
Hiett Hall dormitory

Lawrence enrolls about 1,500 students. The total enrollment in academic year 2010–11 was 1,566 students, the largest student body in Lawrence University's history. Over 75% of the students identify as white, about 12% are international students, and about 25% of students study in the conservatory of music. In the fall of 2014, a quarter of the incoming class were domestic students of color.

Lawrence students have been named Rhodes Scholars seven times. Since 1976, 57 students and nine faculty have received Fulbright Scholarships. Since 1969, 73 students have been named Watson Fellows.

=== Traditions ===
At the beginning of every academic year in September, incoming freshmen arrive a week before returning students to partake in Welcome Week. During Welcome Week, various activities are planned in order to help the incoming class get to know one another and to help them acclimate to college life. During the first night of Welcome Week, students and their parents attend the President's Welcome, which concludes with the traditional matriculation handshake, where every member of the incoming class shakes hands and exchanges words with the university's president.

During the fall term, the on-campus fraternity Beta Theta Pi hosts the annual Beach Bash. For this event, the brothers of ΒθΠ shovel approximately 14 tons of sand into the fraternity house basement, and install a boardwalk and a lifeguard station that doubles as a DJ booth.This tradition was skipped in 2020, due to the COVID-19 pandemic and has not been revived since.

During spring term, Lawrence hosts a music festival, LU-aroo (a play on words on the popular music festival Bonnaroo). Held on the quad, the festival features many talented student bands, both from the college and the conservatory. In 2016, the musician The Tallest Man on Earth played at the festival.

An on-campus bar, the Viking Room (VR), serves as a beloved campus lounge within the basement of the Memorial Hall classroom building. Professors and other senior university personnel frequently serve as guest bartenders, and "VR tokens" are commonly distributed during campus events or when bartering to exchange for drinks at the bar. Students of drinking age customize a numbered tankard that is stored in the VR and is reused by the individual each time they order a drink. Upon graduation, some students take their mugs home with them.

A two-ton granite boulder known simply as "The Rock" has long been a totem for the student body. It has been carved with several class years (most prominently the class of 1895, who first brought the stone to campus), painted and re-painted, stolen, buried, and dumped into the Fox River. From the mid-1960s until 1983, it was buried behind Plantz Hall. It went missing again in 1998, returning to campus in 2017.

=== Media ===
The campus newspaper, The Lawrentian, comes out once per week while school is in session. Although it is student operated, it receives university funding through the Lawrence University Community Council (LUCC), Lawrence's student government. It was first published in May 1884 by a committee representing four literary societies at Lawrence University: the Philalathean, and Phoenix ("gentlemen's societies"); and the Athena and Lawrean ("ladies' societies"). Prior to The Lawrentian, the Phoenix Society had published a newspaper called The Collegian from 1867 to 1878, while the Philalathean and Athena societies published The Neoterian from 1876 to 1878. The two newspapers were merged as The Collegian and Neoterian in 1878, and was reorganized as The Lawrentian in 1884.

Lawrence has a radio station, WLFM, initially operated from 1955 (broadcasting beginning in 1956) through 2005. After 2005 the station was converted to radio broadcast and operated until 2021. In October 2025, a new online WLFM was purchased and has since continued operation.

== Athletics ==
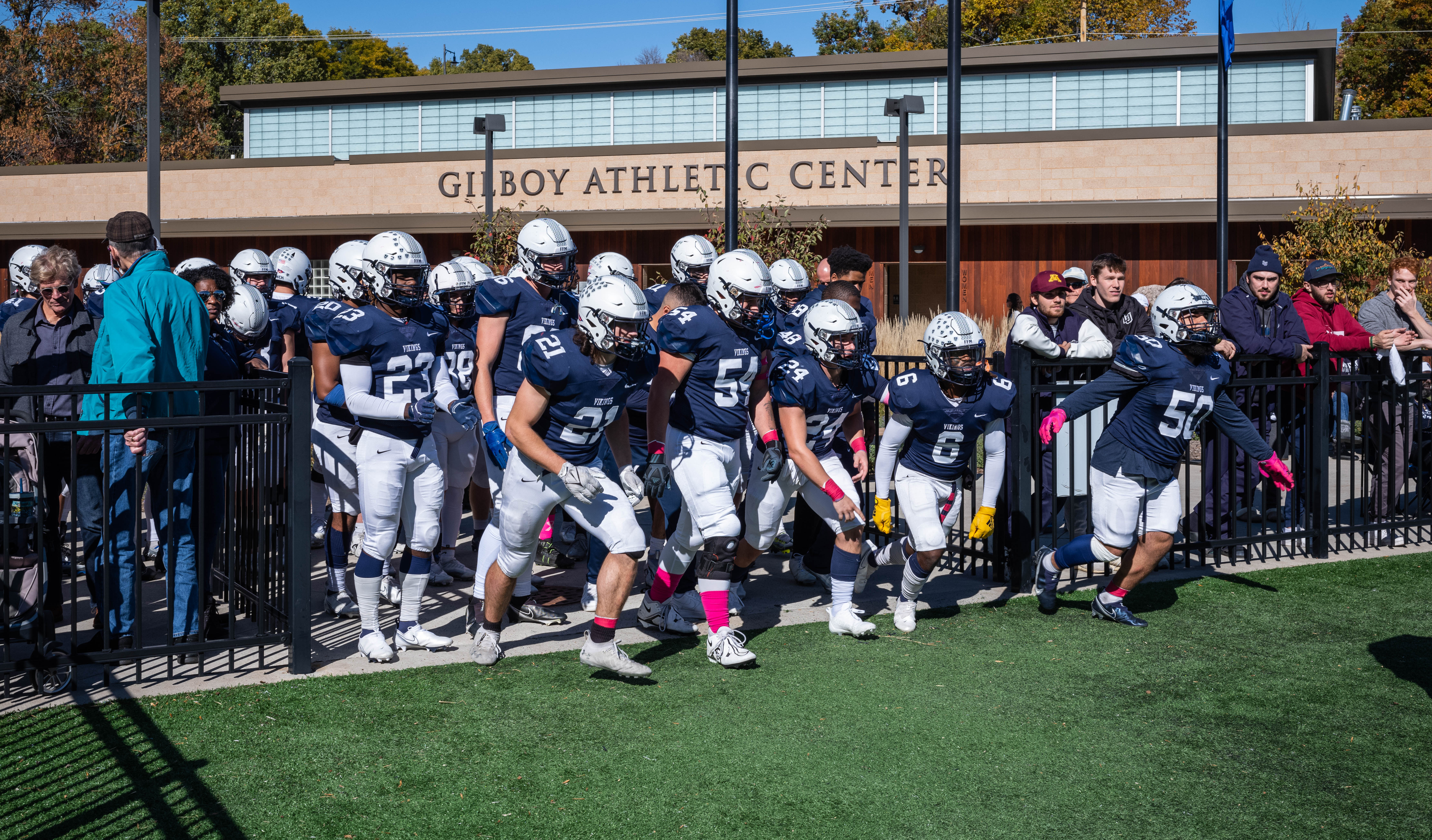
Lawrence Vikings homecoming football game

Lawrence University's intercollegiate athletic teams, known as the Lawrence Vikings since 1926, compete in the Midwest Conference and Northern Collegiate Hockey Association (hockey only) in NCAA Division III. Men's sports include baseball, basketball, cross country, fencing, football, golf, ice hockey, soccer, swimming & diving, tennis, and track & field; women's sports include basketball, cross country, fencing, golf, soccer, softball, swimming & diving, tennis, track & field, and volleyball. The university's venues include the Banta Bowl, Alexander Gymnasium, and Whiting Field. The fight song is "Go, Lawrence, Go".

In 2005–06, the men's basketball team was ranked first in Division III for much of the season, after starting the season unranked. The Vikings were the only undefeated team in all divisions of college basketball for the last six weeks of the season, ending with a record of 25–1. Star forward Chris Braier won the Josten's Award as the top player in the country for both playing ability and community service. Coach John Tharp was named Division III Midwest Coach of the Year. Beginning in 2004, Lawrence qualified for the Division III national tournament in five of the next six years (2004, 2005, 2006, 2008, 2009). Their best result was in 2004, advancing to the quarterfinals (Elite 8), but fell to eventual national champion Wisconsin–Stevens Point by a point in overtime at Tacoma, Washington.

In 2021, Lawrence unveiled a new athletics logo, featuring a Viking ship incorporating the antelope from the crest on the Lawrence coat of arms. This replaced the longstanding previous Viking logo with variations utilized by many other organizations, notably including the Minnesota Vikings. In 2022, the Vikings debuted a new mascot, an antelope named Blu.

== Notable faculty ==
- Marcia Bjornerud, structural geologist and author
- William Chaney, historian
- Richard N. Current, historian
- Emanuel Gerechter, rabbi
- Estelí Gomez, soprano
- John Holiday, opera singer, music professor
- Peter N. Peregrine, anthropologist and archaeologist
- William H. Riker, political scientist
- Charles B. Schudson, judge
- Fred Sturm, jazz composer and musician
- Arthur Thrall, artist
- Harry Dexter White, economist, Soviet informant

== Notable alumni ==
- James Sibree Anderson, Wisconsin state representative
- Martha Bablitch, judge of the Wisconsin Court of Appeals
- John Miller Baer, 1909, congressman from North Dakota
- William Baer, assistant attorney general for the Antitrust Division
- Melvin Baldwin, congressman from Minnesota
- Charles A. Barnard, Wisconsin state representative
- Sam Barry, college basketball and baseball coach (attended)
- Myrt Basing, NFL player
- Jennifer Baumgardner, 1992, feminist writer and activist
- Lisle Blackbourn, 1925, NFL head coach
- Champ Boettcher, NFL player
- Thomas Boyd, Wisconsin state representative
- Alexander Brazeau, Wisconsin state representative
- Webster E. Brown, congressman from Wisconsin (attended)
- Bonnie Bryant, 1968, author of children's books
- Louis B. Butler Jr., 1973, associate justice of the Wisconsin Supreme Court
- Thomas Callaway, actor and interior designer
- Robert A. Collins, Wisconsin state representative
- Julia Colman (1828–1909), temperance educator, activist, editor, writer
- Susan M. Crawford, 1987, justice of the Wisconsin Supreme Court
- Charles Rankin Deniston, Wisconsin state representative
- James Dinsdale, Wisconsin state representative
- William Diver, 1942, linguist and founder of the Columbia School of Linguistics
- Pawo Choyning Dorji, 2006, filmmaker and photographer
- William Draheim, Wisconsin state senator
- Paul Driessen, 1970, author and lobbyist
- Dale Duesing, 1967, operatic baritone
- Siri Engberg, curator, Walker Art Center
- Cynthia Estlund, 1978, law professor and author
- Edna Ferber, author and playwright (attended)
- James A. Frear, congressman from Wisconsin (attended)
- Earle W. Fricker, Wisconsin state representative
- William Fuller, 1975, poet and senior vice president and chief fiduciary officer of Northern Trust Corporation
- Dominic Fumusa, 1991, actor
- John Rankin Gamble, 1872, congressman from South Dakota
- Robert J. Gamble, 1874, congressman from South Dakota
- Ed Glick, NFL player (attended)
- Walter Samuel Goodland, governor of Wisconsin (attended)
- Suzanne Graff, actress
- Michael P. Hammond, 1954, chairman of the National Endowment for the Arts
- Lorena Hickok, confidante of Eleanor Roosevelt (attended)
- John Holdridge, 1977, nationally recognized death penalty lawyer
- Earnest Hooton, 1903, physical anthropologist
- John D. Huber, Columbia University political scientist
- Thomas R. Hudd, congressman from Wisconsin (attended)
- Frank W. Humphrey, 1881, Wisconsin state representative
- Bruce Iglauer, founder of Alligator Records
- Lester Johnson, congressman from Wisconsin
- Zachary Scot Johnson, 2001, singer-songwriter and creator of Thesongadayproject
- Jeffrey Jones, 1968, actor, sex offender
- Ben Joravsky, newspaper columnist, author
- Scott Klug, 1975, former congressman from Wisconsin
- Peter Kolkay, bassoonist
- Eddie Kotal, National Football League player
- Takakazu Kuriyama, Japanese ambassador to the United States (attended)
- Barbara Lawton, 1987, lieutenant governor of Wisconsin (2001–2011)
- Fred Lerdahl, 1965, composer and music theorist
- John A. Luke Jr., 1971, CEO of MeadWestvaco
- Harry N. MacLean, 1964, true crime author
- Momodu Maligie, 2004, minister of Water Resources for Sierra Leone
- William H. Markham, Wisconsin state senator
- James H. McGillan, mayor of Green Bay, Wisconsin
- James Merrell, 1975, professor of history at Vassar College
- John S. Mills, U.S. Air Force major general
- Terry Moran, 1982, chief White House correspondent for ABC News
- David Mulford, 1969, United States ambassador to India (2004–2009)
- William F. Nash, Wisconsin state senator
- George Allen Neeves, Wisconsin state representative
- Tom Neff, 1975, CEO and founder of the Documentary Channel
- Justus Henry Nelson, missionary in the Amazon (attended)
- Garth Neustadter, 2011 Emmy winner, Outstanding Music Composition for a Series
- Angelia Thurston Newman, poet, author, lecturer
- Roger Nicoll, 1963, neuroscientist at UCSF
- Jessica Nelson North, 1917, author
- Arnold C. Otto, Wisconsin state representative
- Rip Owens, NFL player (attended)
- Alice Peacock, 1992 singer-songwriter
- Charles Pettibone, Wisconsin state senator
- Cindy Regal, 2001, experimental physicist
- Scott Reppert, 1983, player for Lawrence's football team
- Eben Eugene Rexford, author of works on gardening (attended)
- Carl W. Riddick, member of the U.S. House of Representatives from the Second District of Montana
- Josh Sawyer, video game designer at Obsidian Entertainment
- Melvin H. Schlytter, Wisconsin state representative
- Campbell Scott, 1983, actor
- Michael Shurtleff, 1942, casting director, author
- Eric Simonson, 1982, Oscar-winning writer and director
- Red Smith, 1926, MLB player, NFL player and assistant coach, head coach of the Georgetown Hoyas football team and Wisconsin Badgers football team
- Anil Singh, 1980, associate justice of New York Supreme Court, Appellate Division
- Janet Steiger, 1961, chairman of the Federal Trade Commission
- Thomas A. Steitz, 1962, Sterling Professor of Molecular Biophysics and Biochemistry at Yale University, 2009 Nobel Prize in Chemistry laureate
- Heidi Stober, 2000, operatic soprano
- W. D. Storey, 1857, judge and district attorney in Santa Cruz County, California
- Fred Sturm, 1973, jazz composer and arranger
- William T. Sullivan, Wisconsin state representative
- Gladys Taber (1899–1980), author
- Anton R. Valukas, 1965, U.S. attorney, author of the Valukas Report
- Madhuri Vijay, 2009, novelist, author of The Far Field
- James Franklin Ware, 1871, legislator
- William Warner, U.S. senator from Missouri (attended)
- Iva Bigelow Weaver, soprano and music educator based in Milwaukee
- Alexander B. Whitman, Wisconsin state senator
- George W. Wolff, Wisconsin state representative and senator
- Tom Zoellner, 1991, author, journalist
- Al Zupek, 1944, NFL player

== See also ==
- List of NCAA fencing schools
