= Björklunden =

Coordinates: 45°2′19″N 87°7′42″W

Björklunden vid Sjön
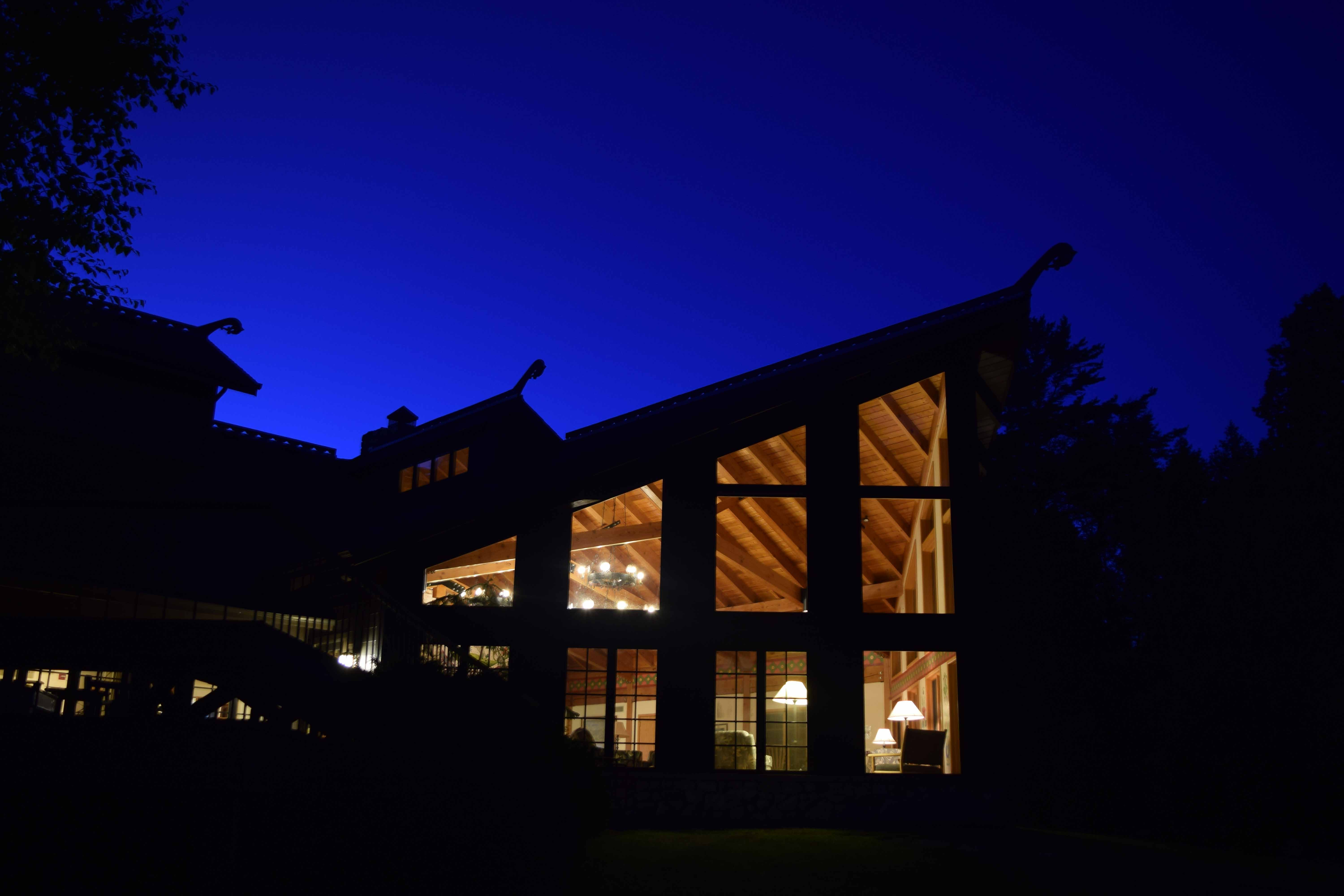
- Björklunden Lodge at Night
- Established: 1928
- Location: Baileys Harbor, Wisconsin, United States
- Affiliations: Lawrence University
- Website: https://www.lawrence.edu/bjorklunden

Björklunden (/biˈjɔːrklʌndən/, Swedish: [ˈbjœ̂rkˌlɵndɛn]; in full: Björklunden Vid Sjön Swedish for 'the birch grove by the lake') is the northern campus of Lawrence University. The 425-acre (172 ha) estate is on Lake Michigan in Door County, Wisconsin, just south of Baileys Harbor. The landscape covers meadows, woods, and over a mile of Lake Michigan shoreline.

Lawrence faculty and students attend seminars and retreats during the academic term. During the summer, Lawrence holds week-long adult continuing education courses. All of these courses and retreats take advantage of Björklunden's natural situation and landscape. Recitals and concerts also occur and are free and open to the public. Almost 1,400 students and faculty members from 65 groups attended 30 separate programs during the 2004–05 academic year.

Donald and Winifred Boynton of Highland Park, Illinois, bequeathed the estate to Lawrence University in 1963. At the time, the buildings on the estate included a main lodge and a stave church the Boyntons handcrafted from 1939 to 1947, including 41 frescoes and carved-wood furnishings. The rustic wooden chapel is a popular site for weddings during the summer.

Fire destroyed the main lodge in 1993. The new lodge opened in 1996, much larger and more modern, but with elements retaining the Norwegian heritage of the estate.

The University signed an agreement with the Door County Land Trust in 2016 to protect 305 of the site's 441 acres from future development. The land is primarily boreal forest occurring far south of its normal range.

== Gallery ==
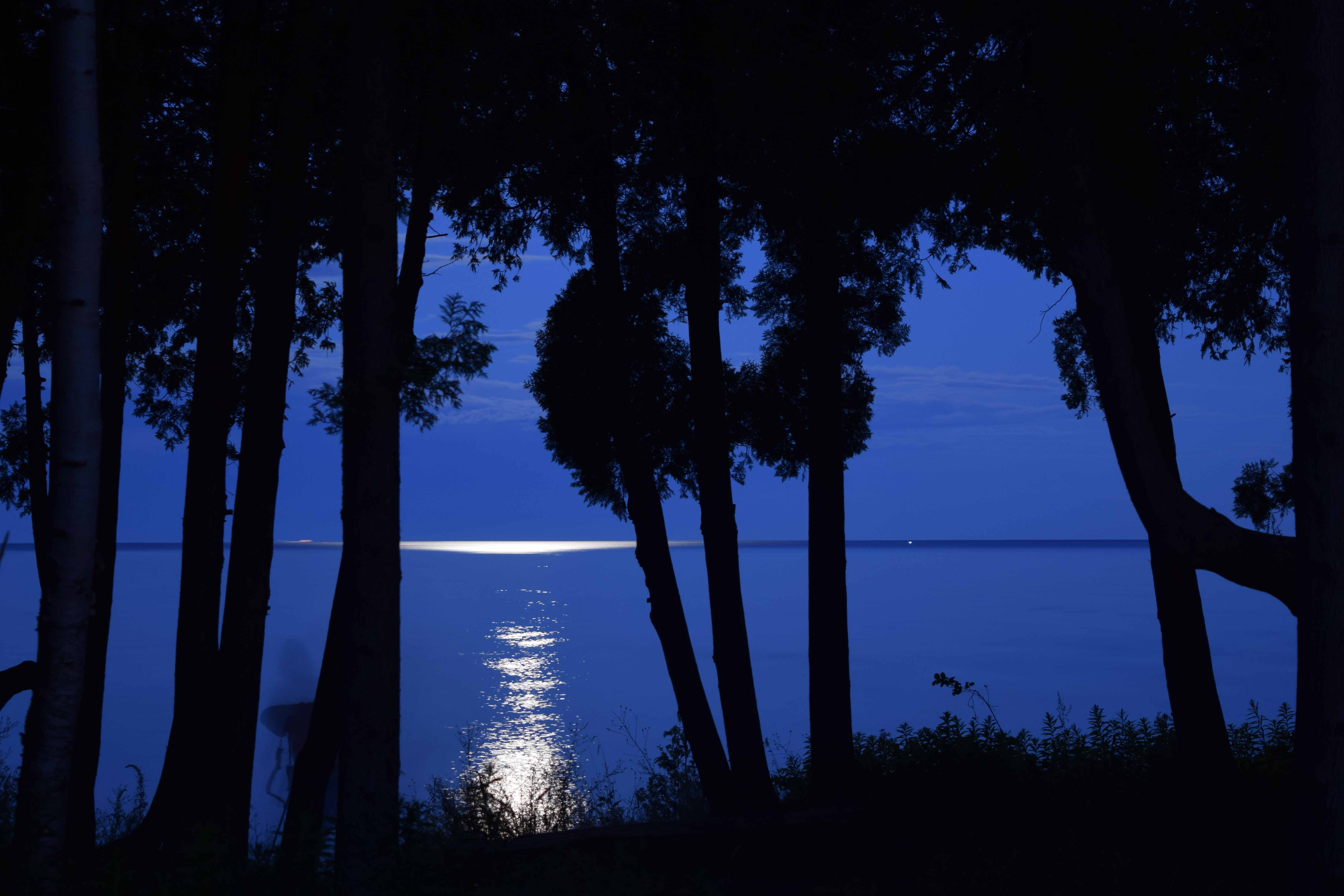
Night photo of moon light on peaceful Lake Michigan

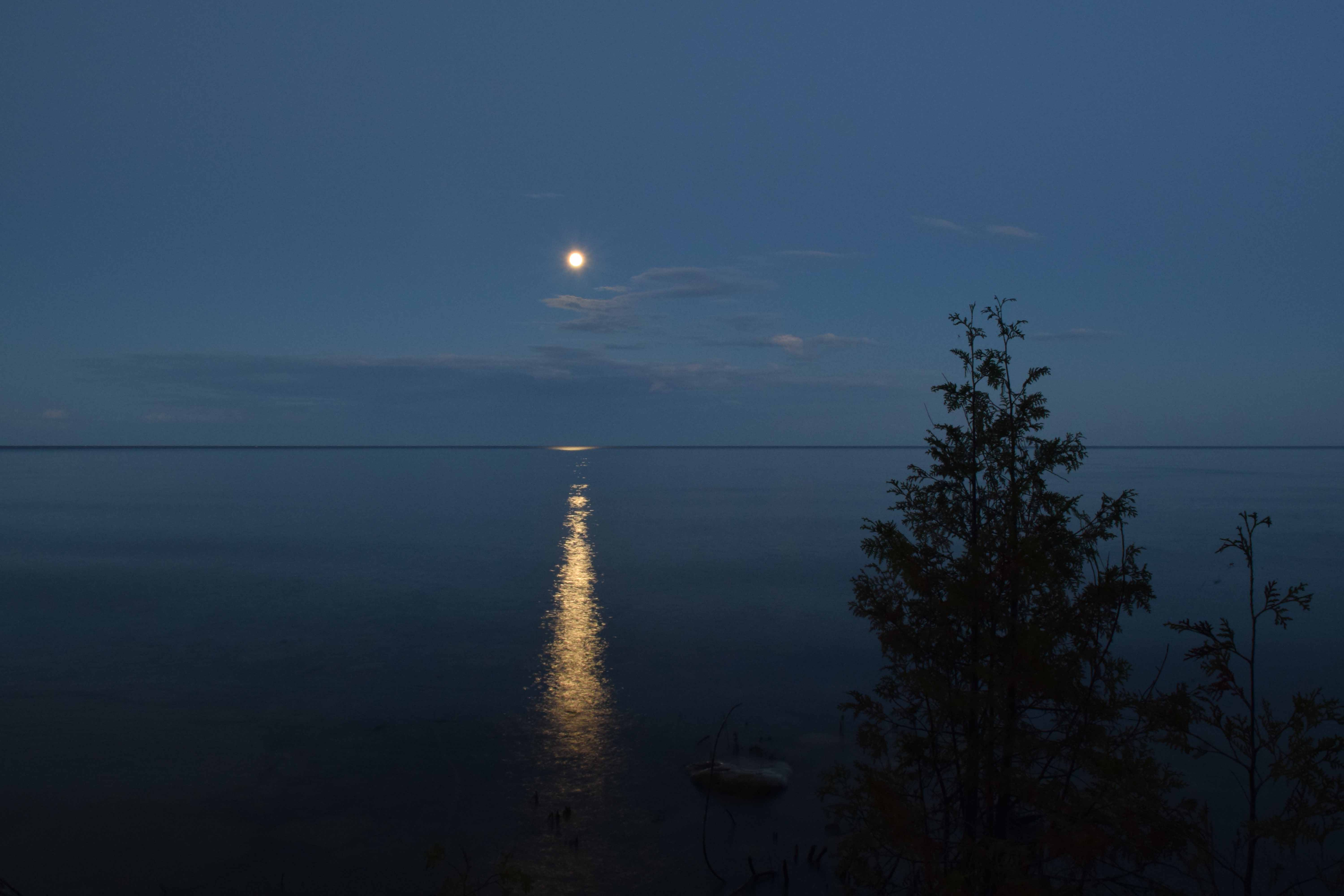
Moonrise over Lake Michigan

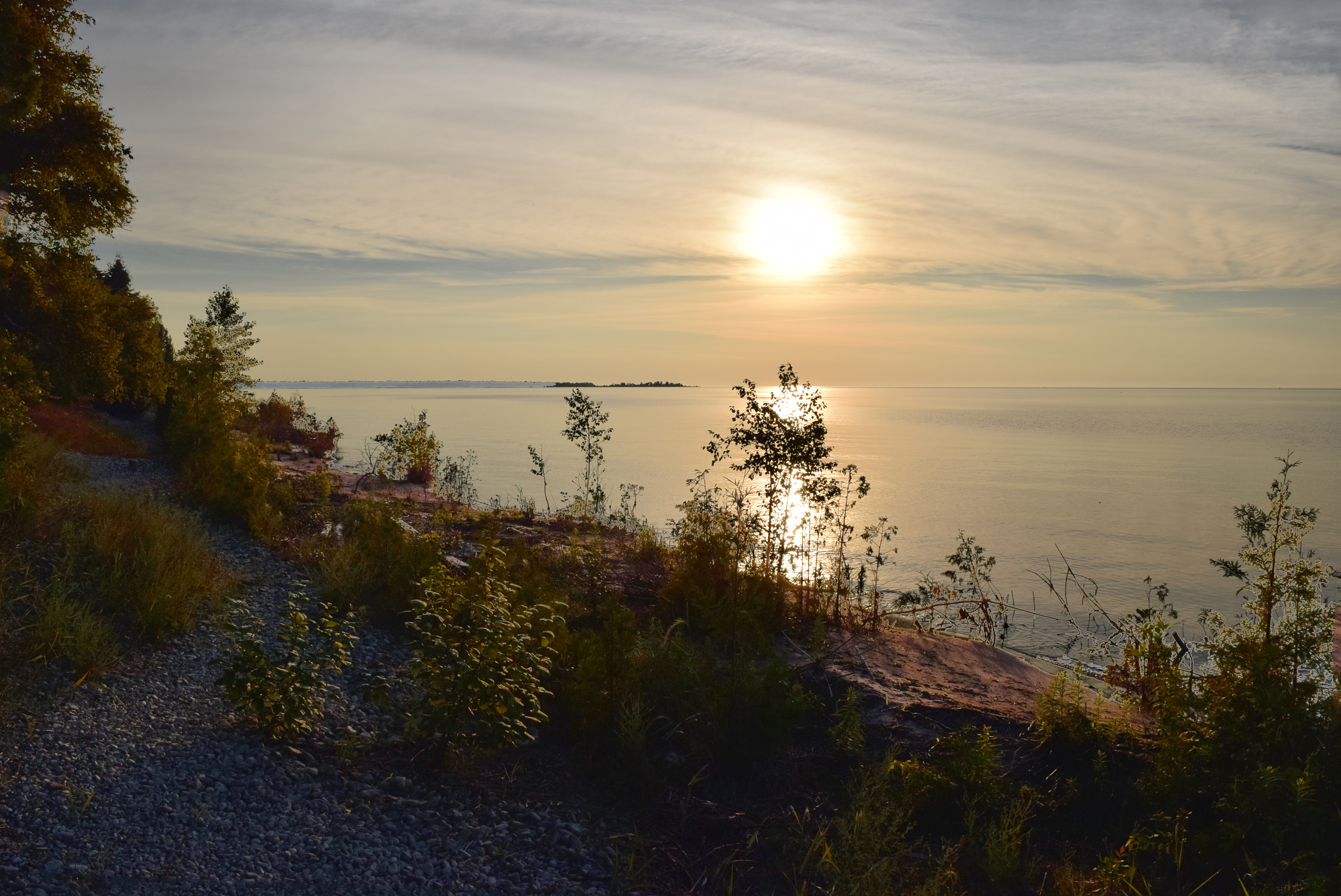
Morning view of Lake Michigan

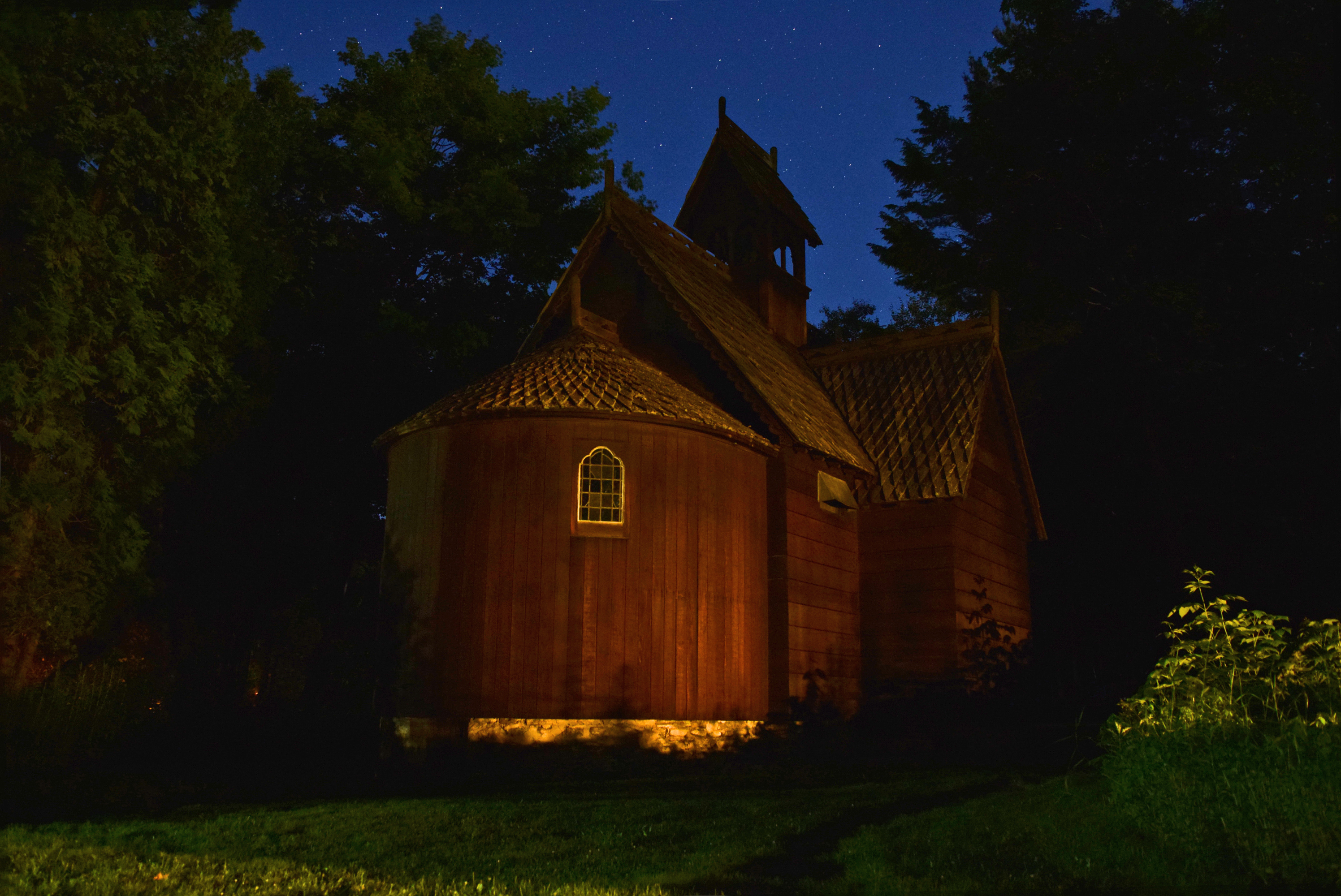
Chapel at Bjorklunden

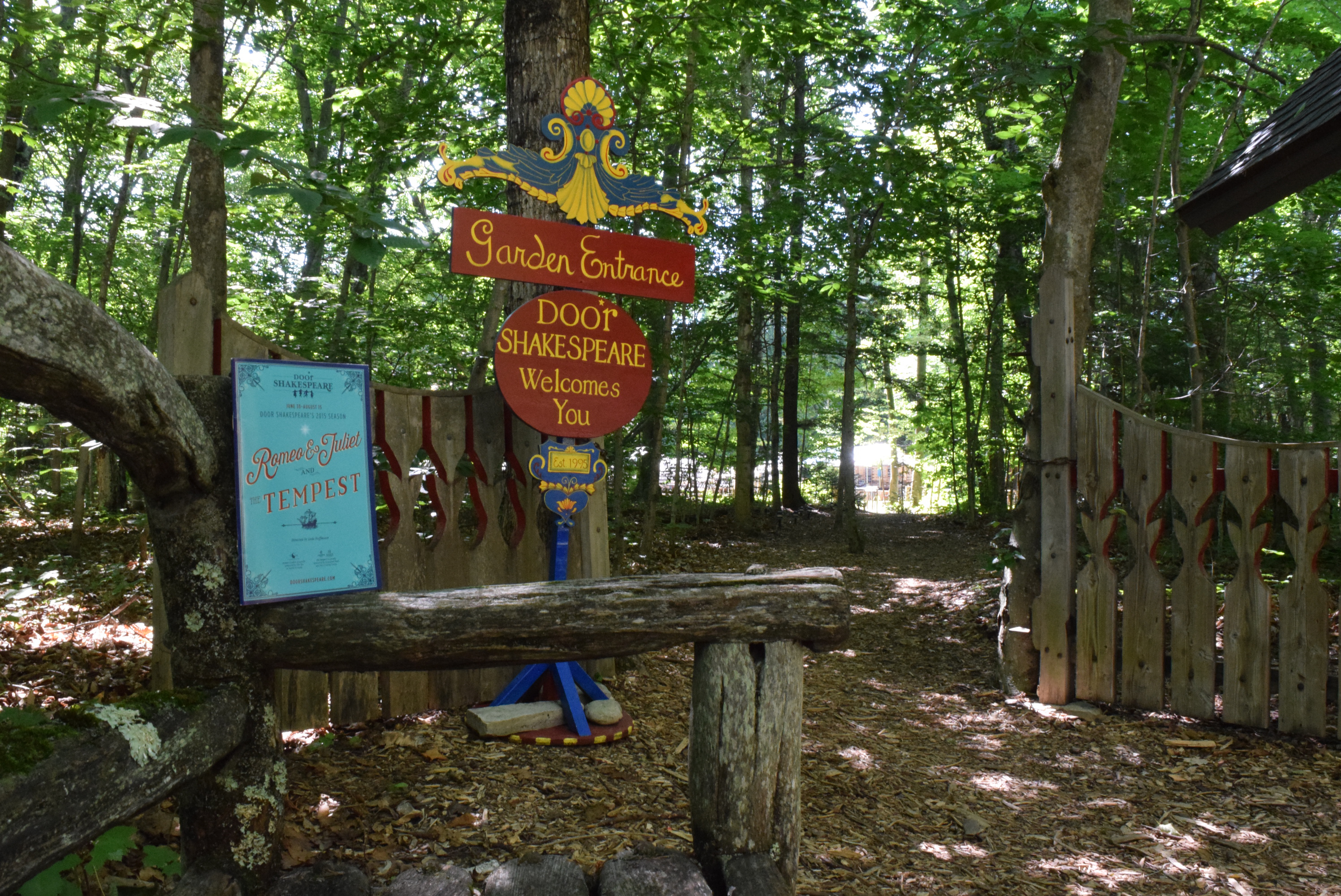
Door Shakespeare - Theater
