= Rip Owens =

American football player (1894–1970)

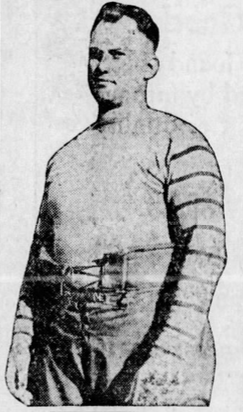
- Owens with the Packers

Profile
- Position: Guard

Personal information
- Born: December 9, 1894; Hebron, Wisconsin, U.S.
- Died: August 22, 1970 (aged 75); Appleton, Wisconsin, U.S.
- Listed height: 5 ft 10 in (1.78 m)
- Listed weight: 220 lb (100 kg)

Career information
- College: Lawrence (1913–1915); Nebraska (Unknown)

Career history
- Green Bay Packers (1922)

Career statistics
- Games played: 3
- Games started: 2
- Stats at Pro Football Reference

Ralph B. "Rip" Owens (December 9, 1894 – August 22, 1970) was an American professional football guard. He played college football for the Lawrence Vikings and Nebraska Cornhuskers and later played one season in the National Football League (NFL) for the Green Bay Packers. After his football career, he worked for the American Can Company.

== Early life ==
Owens was born on December 9, 1894, in Hebron, Wisconsin. Pro Football Reference lists him as having attended Waukegan High School, although one article in The Post-Crescent identified Owens as being "of Ft. Atkinson". He first attended Lawrence University in Wisconsin, where he started at left guard for the Lawrence Vikings as a freshman in 1913.

Owens also served as a placekicker and was named to Lawrence coach Mark Catlin's all-state team for the 1913 season. The paper described him as "only a freshman, but [he] is a powerful man on both offense and defense. Several times during the season he broke through the line and blocked punts. As a place kicker he distinguished himself and tied the Lawrence record if not the secondary college record." He helped Lawrence win the Wisconsin and Illinois collegiate championship, kicking three extra points in the deciding 30–0 win over Carroll.

Owens then won a varsity letter at Lawrence in 1914. He was named an all-state selection again by Catlin and was described in The Post-Crescent as "by far the best guard in the conference and his work in every game of the season stands out so prominently that little need be said about it." In 1915, he helped Lawrence to the state title game and saw action at quarterback, in addition to guard, repeating as an all-state performer. He had left Lawrence by the 1916 season. He later enrolled at the University of Nebraska–Lincoln where he played his last season of college football for the Nebraska Cornhuskers.

Owens served in World War I in the United States Army overseas, being ranked a second lieutenant.

== Professional career ==
Owens signed to play professional football in 1922 with the Green Bay Packers of the National Football League (NFL). He became the joint-second Lawrence Viking ever to play in the NFL, along with Ed Glick who also played for Green Bay in 1922. Prior to joining the Packers, he worked in a steel mill in Waukegan, Illinois. The Green Bay Press-Gazette described him as a "corking good guard ... Owens goes over 200 pounds and [is] as hard as a rock ... For a man of his weight Owens gets over the ground rapidly and often is down the field as fast as the ends on punts." The paper also described him as one of the "greatest line men in professional football," and he was noted as one of the Packers who was "shining brightly" in the team's 19–14 loss to the Rock Island Independents. He ended up appearing in three games for the Packers in the 1922 season, two as a starter, as they compiled a record of 4–3–3, seventh in the NFL. He did not return to the team in 1923.

During his football career, Owens was nicknamed "Rip", "Zip", or "Brick".

== Personal life and death ==
Owens married Josephine Gehrmann in 1917, and had three daughters and a son. After his lone year with the Packers, he moved to Waukegan, Illinois, where he began working for the American Can Company in 1925. He worked there until 1959 and later moved with his wife to Lakeview, Arkansas, in 1968. A freemason, he was a member of the American Legion, Bull Shoals United Methodist Church and the American Association of Retired Persons (AARP). He died in Appleton, Wisconsin, on August 22, 1970, at the age of 75, after having suffered a heart attack while visiting family.
