= Jill Beck =

American academic administrator

15th President of Lawrence University
- In office July 2004 – July 2013
- Succeeded by: Mark Burstein

Personal details
- Born: 1949 (age 76–77) Worcester, Massachusetts, U.S.
- Education: Clark University (BA); McGill University (MA); City University of New York (PhD)

Jill Beck (born 1949) is an American dancer, scholar, administrator and educator. She served as the 15th president of Lawrence University from July 2004 to 2013. On February 2, 2012, Beck announced her intention to retire, and was succeeded by Mark Burstein.

== Early life and education ==
A native of Worcester, Massachusetts, Beck received a B.A. in philosophy and art history from Clark University, an M.A. in history and music from McGill University, and a Ph.D. in theatre history and criticism from the City University of New York.

Preceded by Richard Warch	President of Lawrence University	Succeeded by Mark Burstein
