= William Fuller (poet) =

American poet (born 1953)

- Born: 1953 (age 72–73); Barrington, Illinois, U.S.
- Education: Lawrence University; University of Virginia (PhD)
- Occupation: Poet

William Fuller (born 1953) is a U.S. poet born in Barrington, Illinois. He received his bachelor's degree magna cum laude in English from Lawrence University in 1975. In 1983, Fuller received a Ph.D. in English from the University of Virginia, writing his dissertation on Sir Thomas Browne.

He published his first full-length book, byt, with the Oakland, CA-based publisher O Books in 1989. Some of Fuller's other books include The Sugar Borders (1993), Aether (1998), Sadly (2003), Watchword (2006), Three Replies (2008), and Hallucination (2011).

Some of Fuller's chapbook publications include The Coal Jealousies (1987), The Central Reader (1998), Three Poems (2000), Roll (2000), Avoid Activity (2003), Dry Land (2007), and Three Replies (2008). A biographical note published in Sadly calls attention to Fuller's twenty years of employment at The Northern Trust Corporation of Chicago, where he is senior vice president and chief fiduciary officer.

== Selected bibliography ==
- byt (1989) (Scalapino's Press, O books)
- Sadly (2003) (Chicago: Flood Editions) ISBN 978-0-9710059-7-6
- Watchword(2006) (Chicago, IL: Flood Editions) ISBN 978-0-9746902-9-2
- Dry Land (2007)(Cambridge, UK: Equipage)
- Three Replies (2009)(London, UK: Barque) ISBN 1-903488-62-2 OCLC 432328238
- Hallucination (2011) (Chicago, IL: Flood Editions) ISBN 978-0-9819520-7-9
