= Momodu Maligie =

Sierra Leonean politician

Momodu Maligi

Sierra Leone's Minister of Water Resources
- Incumbent
- Assumed office January 16, 2013

Personal details
- Born: 28 November 1981 (age 44) Bonthe District, Sierra Leone
- Party: All People's Congress (APC)
- Education: Lawrence University, Valparaiso University

Momodu Maligi is a Sierra Leonean politician and former Minister of Water Resources for Sierra Leone. At thirty two years old, he became the youngest Sierra Leonean cabinet minister in President Ernest Bai Koroma's cabinet.

He was chosen as Water Resources Minister by Sierra Leone's president, Ernest Bai Koroma in his second term cabinet in early January; and was approved by the Sierra Leone House of Parliament on January 11, 2013. He was sworn in as Sierra Leone's Minister of Water Resources on January 16, 2013 at State House in the capital Freetown.

Maligi received his bachelor's degree in Government and International Relations from Lawrence University in Appleton, Wisconsin in the United States and a master's degree in International Commerce and Public Policy from Valparaiso University in Indiana, United States.

After graduating from Lawrence University, Maligi earned a graduate degree and subsequently returned to Sierra Leone with hopes of rebuilding his homeland, now at peace after ten years of intense fighting. Maligi was employed as a Managing Consultant in the United States. Recognizing the complexities of the problems facing his country, Maligi spent the next decade gaining experience in the main sectors of the country's economy, namely mining, government, small business, and banking. He was a Senior Manager at the Sierra Leone's National Social Security and Insurance Trust Customer Service and was also the Head of Corporate Global Banking of the Standard Chartered Bank in Freetown. Maligi is a native of Bonthe District in Southern Sierra Leone and a member of the All People's Congress (APC).
