= New Catholic Encyclopedia =

English-language reference work

- Cover of the NCE 2nd edition
- Author: Catholic University of America
- Genre: Encyclopedia
- Publisher: McGraw Hill
- Publication date: 1967
- Publication place: United States
- ISBN: 9780787640194
- Preceded by: Catholic Encyclopedia

The New Catholic Encyclopedia (NCE) is a multi-volume reference work on Roman Catholic history and belief edited by the faculty of the Catholic University of America in Washington, D.C. The NCE was originally published in 1967 by McGraw-Hill in New York City. A second edition, which discarded articles more reminiscent of a general encyclopedia, was published in 2002.

Like the original Catholic Encyclopedia, published from 1907 to 1914, the NCE was meant to be a standard library reference work for clergy, laity, students, teachers, librarians, journalists, and general readers interested in the history, doctrine, practices, and people of the Roman Catholic faith. The 1967 edition added more general and expanded articles on science, education, and the liberal arts plus ecumenism, reflecting the Second Vatican Council of 1962–65. The 2002 edition was listed as one of the academic periodical Library Journal's recommended "Best Reference Sources" for 2003.

== First edition ==
The original Catholic Encyclopedia was published between 1907 and 1914, first by the Robert Appleton Company, and then by its successor The Encyclopedic Press Inc. Supplements to the Catholic Encyclopedia were published in 1922 and in 1958.

In 1960 the Catholic University of America, in collaboration with McGraw-Hill, began work on an entirely new encyclopedia. In 1967, the New Catholic Encyclopedia (NCE1) was published in 15 volumes. Alphabetic supplemental volumes appeared in 1974, 1979, 1989, and 1996.

== Jubilee Volume ==
In 2001, in collaboration with the Catholic University of America, Gale Publishing, a subsidiary of the Thomson Corporation, published a Jubilee Volume: The Wojtyła Years, which focuses on the pontificate of Pope John Paul II and included thematic essays that covered the person, his work, and pontificate in two parts:

1. From the Poland of Karol Wojtyła to the World of John Paul II — Thematic Essays
2. John Paul II and His Pontificate

The second part offers various sections (e.g. "Magisterial Documents", "People and Places, Institutions and Events"), the content for each of which is arranged with entries in alphabetical order.

At times listed as volume 20 of NCE1, it was envisioned by the editor "not so much as a supplement to the original edition as a propaedia, a preamble, to the revised edition of the NCE", which was to follow a year later. Some of the material of the Jubilee Volume appeared in later supplements, notably the 2010 supplement to NCE2.

== Second edition ==
The second edition of the New Catholic Encyclopedia (NCE2) incorporated material from the original first edition of 1967 and its supplements of the 1970s, 1980s and 1990s, along with further additions and revisions. It was published in 2002 by Gale Publishing in 14 volumes, with a fifteenth volume consisting of a cumulative index to the entire encyclopedia. Supplemental volumes later appeared for this second edition.

In addition to the hundreds of new signed articles on a wide variety of topics, the 2002 edition also featured biographies of contemporary religious figures; thousands of photographs, maps and illustrations; and some updated bibliographical citations. The photographs remained printed in black and white.

The original volumes of NCE2 are:

- Volume 1: A–Azt.
- Volume 2: Baa–Cam.
- Volume 3: Cam–Col.
- Volume 4: Com–Dyn.
- Volume 5: Ead–Fre.
- Volume 6: Fri–Hoh.
- Volume 7: Hol–Jub.
- Volume 8: Jud–Lyo.
- Volume 9: Mab–Mor.
- Volume 10: Mos–Pat.
- Volume 11: Pau–Red.
- Volume 12: Ref–Sep.
- Volume 13: Seq–The.
- Volume 14: Thi–Zwi.
- Volume 15: Index.

=== Reviews ===
NCE2 received mixed reviews. While applauding the effort, reviewers found the updating to be spotty, for example, many bibliographies were not updated, new notable buildings were omitted, and important new research results were not included. In addition, a large number of articles and 3.5 million words that appeared in NCE1 were omitted entirely. An editor, Berard Marthaler, said that the reduction in size "had to be done with a meat cleaver, not a scalpel." Controversial subjects were, to some extent, avoided in the second edition; for example, as Jan Malcheski and Herman Sutter both noted in their reviews, an article from the 1996 NCE1 supplement on pedophilia was omitted in the NCE2. The tone of the multi-author work was also variable, from older, scholarly articles such as the one on "Aristotle", to those pitched for a more general audience such as the article on "Joy".

=== Supplementation for the second edition ===
In the summer of 2006, the publisher Gale and the Catholic University of America Press developed a plan for ongoing updating of the second edition in print and electronic (eBook) formats. The plan indicated a special focus on the United States. The planned new entries included biographies as well as articles on movements, organizations, documents and ideas that are either Catholic or of special interest to Catholics.

The first of these New Catholic Encyclopedia supplemental volumes, Supplement 2009, was published electronically in June 2009 and in print in November 2009. It focused on the theme of "Science and the Church", and contained new articles like ones on Charles Darwin and Sigmund Freud. It also updated the articles on the Catholic Church in each of the fifty states, as well as the 33 US archdiocese articles. It contains a much updated bibliography. Most of the editors now belong to Catholic institutions other than the Catholic University of America.

Supplement 2010, published in June 2010, focused on the theme "Church in Modern History", with particular emphasis on World War II and thereafter. It included about 200 entries on people beatified or canonized since 2003. Most of the beatified were new entries, while most of the saints were revisions of previous articles, although overall the 2010 supplement had more new entries than revised (updated) ones.

Supplement 2011 focused on the theme "Church and the Arts and Music"; among its new articles were one on the sex abuse crisis and one on Pope Benedict XVI, as well as new entries on St. Mary Helen McKillop (1842–1907) and St. Andre Bessette (1845–1937).

"Ethics and Philosophy" was the theme for the 2012–2013 supplement.

== See also ==
- Catholic Encyclopedia (1914)
