= Mark Burstein (academic administrator) =

16th President of Lawrence University

16th President of Lawrence University
- In office July 1, 2013 – July 1, 2021
- Preceded by: Jill Beck
- Succeeded by: Laurie Carter

Personal details
- Education: Vassar College (AB); University of Pennsylvania (MBA)

Mark Burstein is an American academic administrator who served as the 16th president of Lawrence University. He took office on July 1, 2013, succeeding Jill Beck. Burstein previously served as an Executive Vice President at Princeton University from 2004 to 2013.

== Early life and education ==
Raised in Cedar Grove, New Jersey, Burstein graduated from Cedar Grove High School in 1979 and was an active member of the Young Judaea organization.

Burstein received a Bachelor of Arts degree as a history and independent studies at Vassar College in 1984, where he was awarded the Catlin Prize for outstanding contribution to the college community. He received a Master of Business Administration degree from the Wharton School of the University of Pennsylvania.

== Career ==
Burstein began his career in public services, banking and consulting. He held positions at the New York City Department of Sanitation, Bear Stearns, and the Center for Applied Research. He also served on the New York City Mayor's Applied Sciences Advisory Board. He was the chair of directors of the national political action committee LGBTQ Victory Fund from 2008 to 2010.

Prior to assuming his role at Princeton University, Burstein worked at Columbia University, where he was the Vice President for Facilities Management, Vice President for Student Services, and acting Vice President for Human Resources.

In September 2020, Burstein announced that he would retire as president of Lawrence University at the end of the 2020–2021 school year. Burstein and his husband cited his desire to return to the East Coast to be closer to their parents.

== Personal life ==
Burstein married David Calle in November 2009. Calle is businessman and graduate of the University of Pennsylvania and MIT Sloan School of Management.
