= Main Hall (Lawrence University) =

- Main Hall, Lawrence University
- U.S. National Register of Historic Places
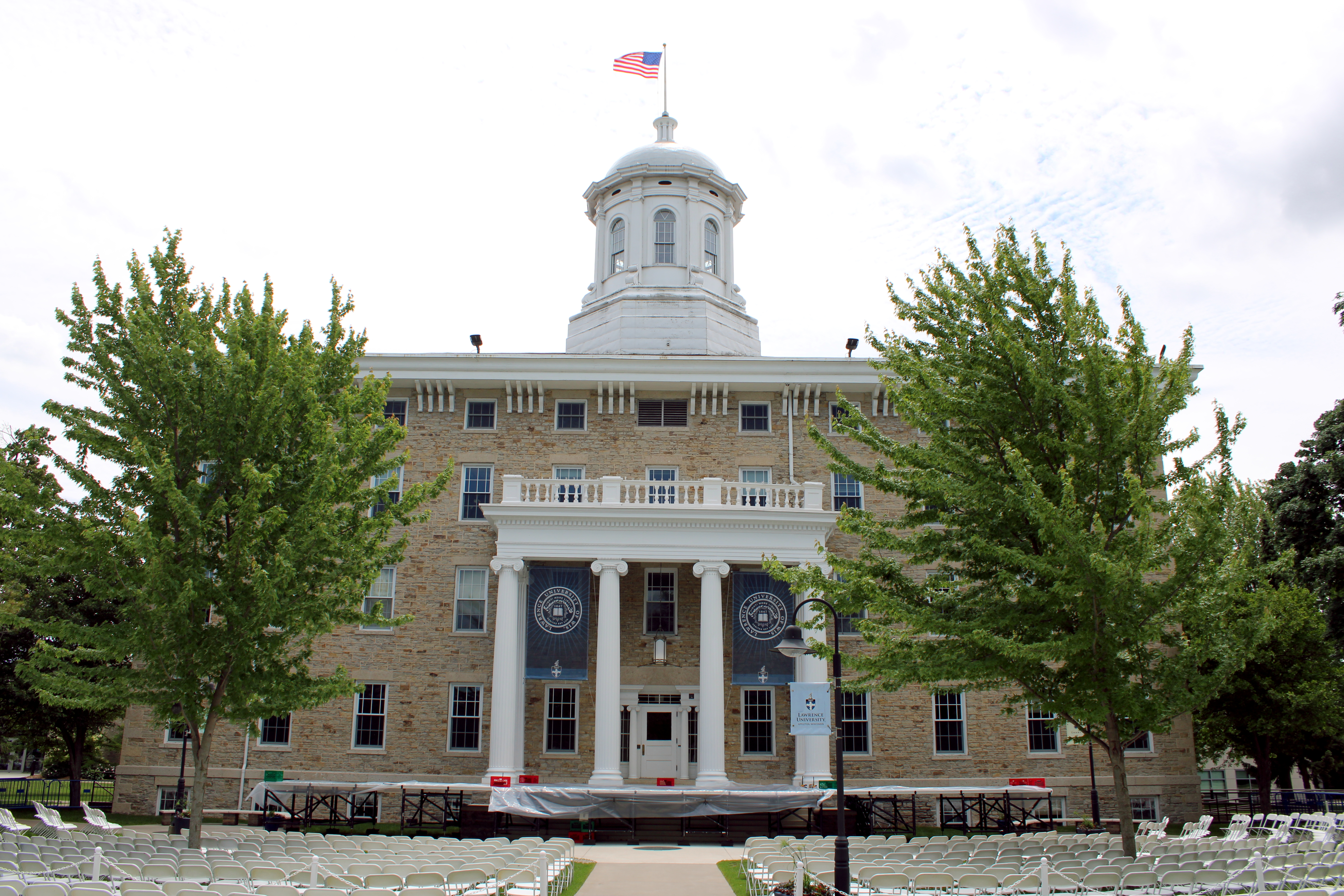

- Location within Wisconsin Location within the United States
- Location: 501 E. College Ave., Appleton, Outagamie County, Wisconsin
- Coordinates: 44°15′39″N 88°23′58″W
- Area: less than one acre
- Built: 1853
- Architect: Peter Williamson
- Architectural style: Classical revival
- NRHP reference No.: 74000113
- Added to NRHP: January 18, 1974

Main Hall is an academic building on the campus of Lawrence University in Appleton, Wisconsin. Constructed in 1853, it was listed on the National Register of Historic Places in 1974.

Main Hall was the second building on the Lawrence campus, after the long-demolished Lawrence Institute building erected in 1848. Funding for the building came from the sale of $100 "perpetual scholarships" to Lawrence College. It is constructed of stone from local limestone quarries, with a dome made from wood and hand-hewed beams from local sawmills. When it was first built, Main Hall housed a library, chapel, classrooms, housing for men, and offices for faculty and administration.

The building was known in the early twentieth century as "Recitation Hall." It was remodeled in 1938, 1941, the 1970s, and 1999. A sundial from Milwaukee-Downer College was added to the back of the building after that institution merged with Lawrence in 1964. As of 2010, it held classrooms and offices for classics, languages, history, philosophy, and religious studies departments, as well as a student commons and a faculty lounge.
