= Thomas S. Smith (educator) =

President of Lawrence University (1921–2004)

Thomas S. Smith (1921–2004) served as the 13th president of Lawrence University in Appleton, Wisconsin from 1969 to 1979.

Smith came to Lawrence from Ohio University, where he had spent two years as provost, assuming the president's office on July 1, 1969. He presided over the college until his retirement on August 31, 1979.

He led the college during one of the more difficult periods in its recent history. Student unrest over the Vietnam War and civil rights activism, as well as pressure from the student body for more of a voice in matters of academic and student life, required delicate and decisive leadership. When Smith arrived on campus in 1969, his first faculty meeting was disrupted by students protesting U.S. involvement in the Vietnam War.

During the 1970s, the college, along with American higher education in general, faced an extended period of fiscal austerity, necessitating difficult decisions and the retrenchment of faculty, staff, and administration.

Among the milestones of his presidency were the completion of a major capital campaign, the opening of the Seeley G. Mudd Library in 1975, the strengthening of the university endowment, an extensive administrative reorganization involving academic affairs, admissions, development and student life, improvements in the curriculum and the renovations of Sage and Ormsby Halls.

"Tom was a quiet and unassuming man, yet forceful and straightforward in his dealings and interactions with others," recalled Richard Warch, who succeeded Smith as Lawrence University president in 1979. "I had the privilege of serving with him for the last two years of his tenure (as vice president of academic affairs) and counted him a friend and mentor and admired him as a man of principle and honor."

In 1972, President Richard Nixon appointed Smith to the President's Committee on the National Medal of Science, the selection committee for the prestigious awards for distinguished contributions in physical, biological, mathematics, or engineering sciences. The following year, Wisconsin Governor Patrick Lucey appointed Smith chairman of the newly created State Ethics Board, a position he still held when he left Lawrence.

Smith also served on the boards of the National Association of Independent Colleges and Universities and Independent College Funds of America, Inc.

After leaving Lawrence, Smith served as executive director of the Lakeshore Consortium in Support of the Arts, an organization promoting increased awareness of, participation in, and contributions to an enhanced environment for arts activities in the Fox River Valley. He maintained a commitment to liberal education in retirement remaining active with the Waupaca-based Winchester Academy, encouraging it to foster its historic focus on the liberal arts and sciences and music.

Born February 8, 1921, Smith was one of 10 children—five of whom survived infancy—born to a Hubbard, Ohio steelworker and his wife. He attended Kenyon College on a full tuition scholarship and graduated magna cum laude in 1947, earning a Bachelor of Arts degree in physics. He earned a Ph.D. in physics at Ohio State University in 1952.

Later that same year, Smith began his academic career as an assistant professor of physics at Ohio University in Athens, Ohio. In 1961, he was appointed an assistant to the president of Ohio University. From 1962 to 1967, he served as vice president for academic affairs and was named provost in 1967.
