= Austrian Americans =

Americans of Austrian birth or descent

Austrian Americans Österreichamerikaner
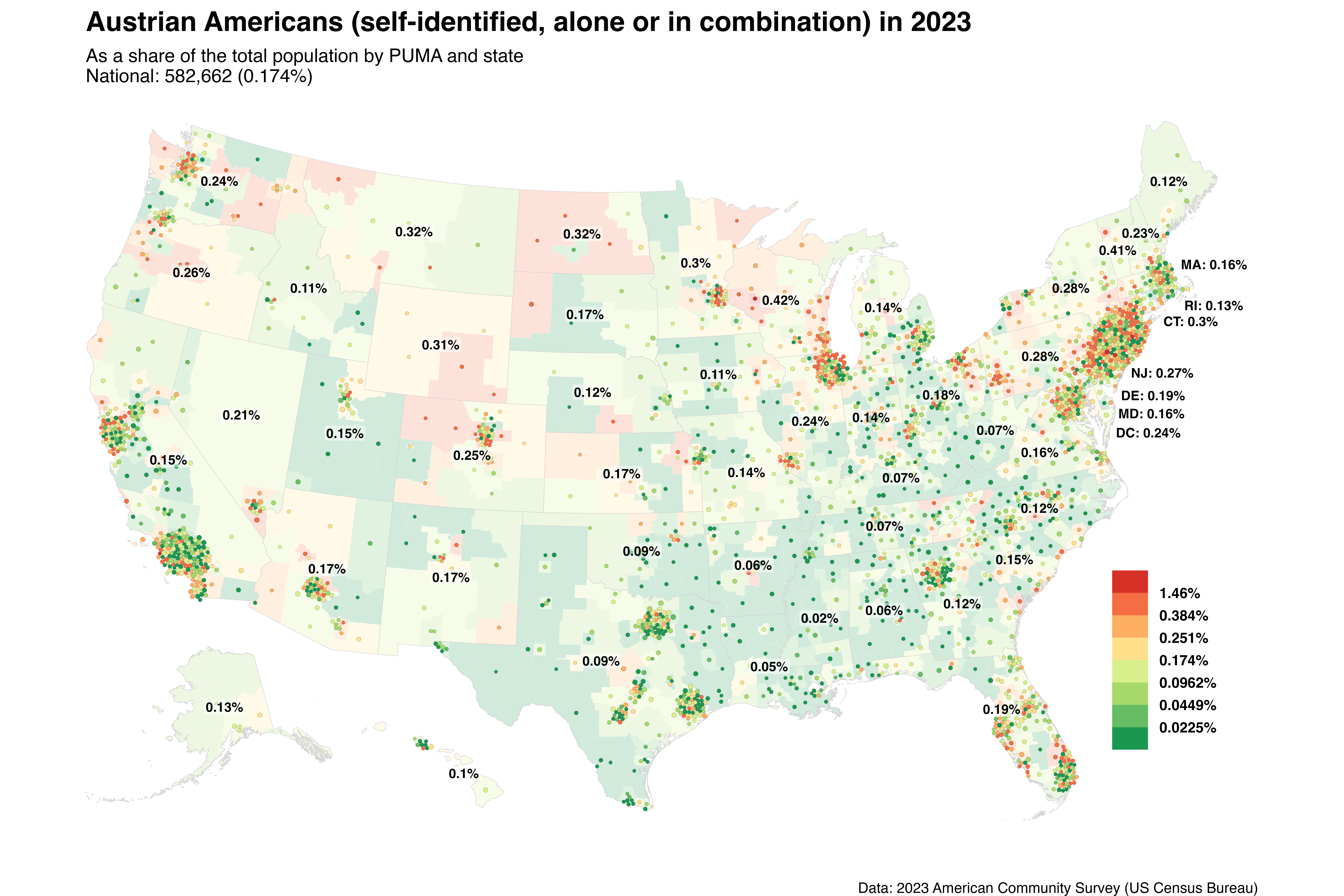

Total population
- 575,672 (2024)

Regions with significant populations
- New York, California, Pennsylvania, Ohio, Florida, Illinois, Wisconsin, New Jersey, Connecticut, Kansas, Texas, Oregon, Georgia

Languages
- Austrian German, American English

Religion
- Roman Catholic, Protestant; Jewish and other minorities

Related ethnic groups
- Dutch Americans; German Americans; Swiss Americans; German diasporas

Austrian Americans (German: Österreichamerikaner, pronounced [ˈøːstɐraɪçameriˌkaːnɐ]) are Americans of Austrian descent, chiefly German-speaking Catholics and Jews. According to the 2000 U.S. census, there were 735,128 Americans of full or partial Austrian descent, accounting for 0.3% of the population. The true figure is difficult to pin down given the fluid borders and successive political reorganizations of the Habsburg monarchy and Central Europe, which at times included the multi-ethnic Austrian Empire and Austria-Hungary.

The states with the largest Austrian American populations are New York (93,083), California (84,959), Pennsylvania (58,002, most of them in the Lehigh Valley), Florida (54,214), New Jersey (45,154), and Ohio (27,017). Many Americans of German, Czech, Polish, Slovak, Slovene, Croatian, and Ukrainian descent can also trace their ancestry to former Habsburg territories, meaning the population figures for Austrian Americans likely represents an undercount. These regions were major sources of immigrants to the United States before World War I, and their inhabitants often assimilated into larger immigrant and ethnic communities throughout the U.S.

== History ==
Austrian workers at iron mines in Minnesota, 1911

The Archduchy of Austria never held any colonies in the Americas. Austrian migration to the U.S. probably started in the 18th century, when a group of 50 families from the city of Salzburg migrated to the newly founded Province of Georgia. Having a Protestant background, the Salzburg Protestants migrated because of Catholic repression in their country. They established their own community in Ebenezer, Georgia, in 1734. President Bill Clinton proclaimed September 26, 1997, as Austrian American Day and cited the Salzburgers' contributions to American history.

The Revolutions of 1848 in the Austrian Empire drove many of the intellectuals who had led the uprisings into exile, with a significant number settling in the United States. These "Forty-Eighters" tended to settle in large cities of the Northeastern United States and Midwestern United States. A number became active in the American abolitionist movement.

From around the 1870s until the outbreak of World War I in 1914, Austrians emigrated in large numbers to the U.S. Over two million people from Austria-Hungary immigrated to the United States throughout the 19th century, though because of the empire's multi-ethnic status, it is difficult to determine how many of these immigrants were ethnic Austrians. Over 275,000 Austrian Americans lived in the United States by 1900. Austria-Hungary was also one of six countries to send more than a million immigrants to the U.S. within a single decade, arriving at roughly two million between 1900 and 1909 alone. World War I caused diplomatic relations between the United States and the Austro-Hungarian Empire to be terminated on April 8, 1917, which resulted in a dramatic decrease in Austrian immigration to the United States.

Following the Anschluss, the annexation of Austria into Nazi Germany in 1938, large numbers of Austrians migrated to the United States, most of whom were Jewish Austrians fleeing the Nazi persecution. By 1941, some 29,000 Jewish Austrians had emigrated to the United States. Most of them were doctors, lawyers, architects and artists, including composers, writers and stage and film directors). After World War II ended, some further 40,000 Austrians emigrated to the United States in the period 1945–1960.

Since the 1960s, Austrian immigration has been very limited, owing to Austria's high levels of development and political freedom. According to the 1990 United States census, 948,558 people identified their origins in Austria. Most of the present-day immigrants who currently live in the U.S. who were born in Austria identify themselves as being of Austrian ancestry, but the percentage who identify themselves as being of German ancestry is larger than the one expected on the basis of the opinion polls in Austria.

According to the United States Census Bureau, in 2015, there were 26,603 individuals living in the U.S. born in Austria who identified themselves as being of Austrian ancestry. By contrast, in the same year, there were 6,200 individuals living in the U.S. born in Austria who identified themselves as being of German ancestry. Most of the immigrants from South Tyrol, an Italian province formerly part of the Austrian Empire, identify themselves as being of German rather than Austrian ancestry. According to the Census Bureau, in 2015, there were 365 individuals living in the U.S. born in Italy who identified themselves as being of Austrian ancestry. By contrast, in the same year, there were 1,040 individuals living in the U.S. born in Italy who identified themselves as being of German ancestry.

== Culture ==
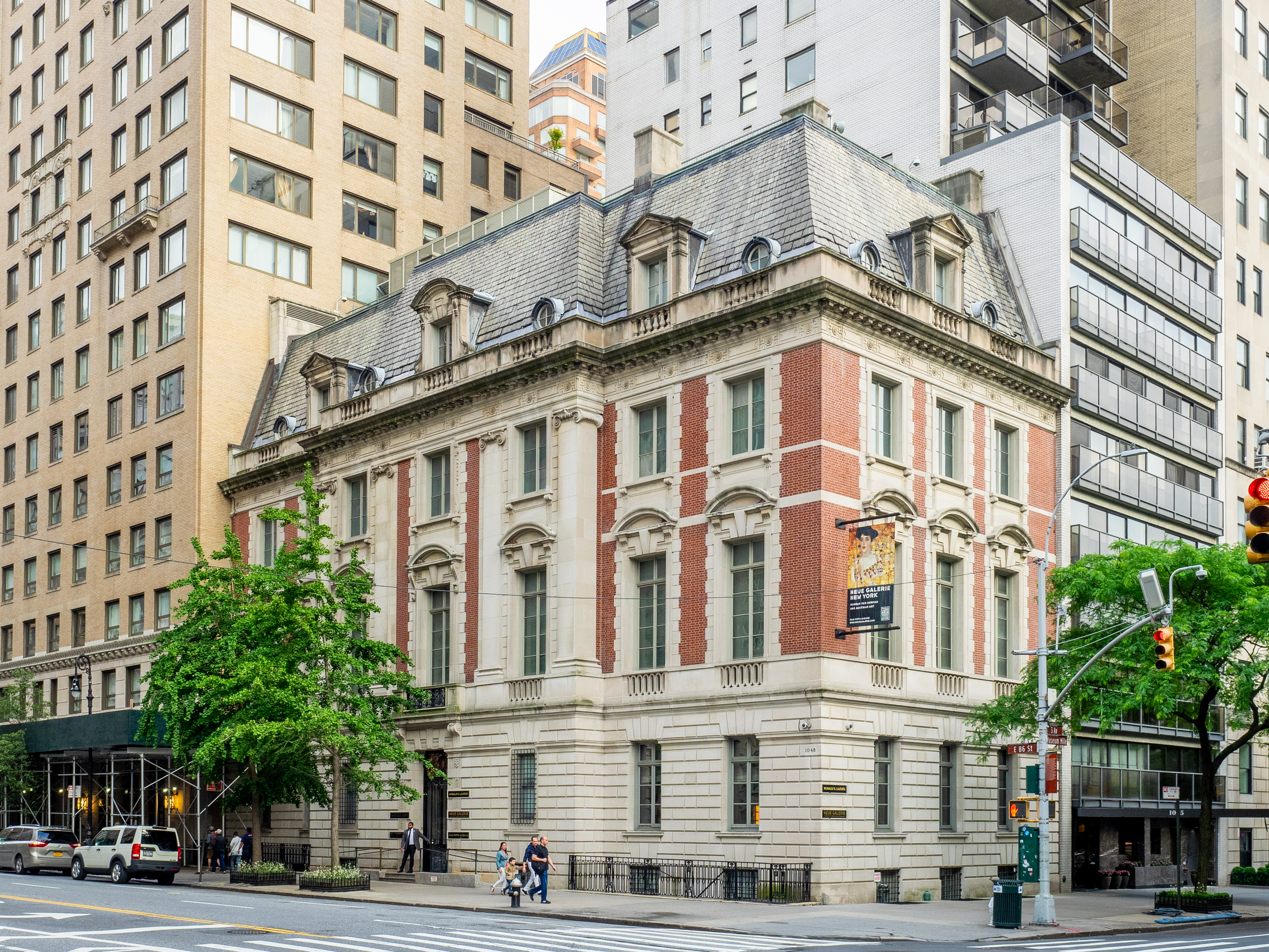
The Neue Galerie New York is a museum of early-20th century German and Austrian art and design on the Upper East Side of Manhattan.

Austrian immigrants adapted quickly to American society because the Austro-Hungarian Empire had also been a melting pot of many cultures and languages. On the other hand, despite the rejection that Austrians feel toward the behavior of the Germans, regarded by Austrians as less tolerants and cosmopolitans, they have suffered the same damages and discrimination that German immigrants have faced in the United States. They were considered by Americans to be the same because of their language and both world wars.

The emigration of religious groups from Austria to the United States, especially the Jews from Vienna after 1938, has also contributed to strengthen religious variety in the United States. Isidor Bush (1822–98) emigrated from Vienna in 1849 and became a leading Jewish citizen of the city of St. Louis and the state of Missouri through his business ventures, religious work, and political activities. His vineyards were famous and profitable.

== Austrian-American communities in the United States ==
The U.S. communities with the highest percentage of self-professed Austrian Americans are:

Top U.S. communities by Austrian American Population
	Percentage	Community	State
1	12.10%	Waterville	Wisconsin
2	10.60%	Coplay	Pennsylvania
3	9.20%	Durand	Wisconsin
4	5.20%	Rock Creek	Wisconsin
4	5.20%	Northampton	Pennsylvania
5	4.50%	Allen Township	Pennsylvania
6	4.40%	Drammen	Wisconsin
7	4.30%	Palenville	New York
8	4.20%	Great Neck Plaza	New York
8	4.20%	Upper Nazareth Township	Pennsylvania
8	4.20%	Schuylkill Township	Pennsylvania
9	4.10%	Noble Township	Indiana
10	4.00%	Highland Beach	Florida
10	4.00%	Mondovi	Wisconsin
11	3.90%	North Catasauqua	Pennsylvania
11	3.80%	Russell Gardens	New York
12	3.70%	Washington Township	Kansas
13	3.60%	Whitehall Township	Pennsylvania
13	3.60%	Arma	Kansas
13	3.60%	Tuscarawas	Ohio
14	3.30%	Hewlett Harbor	New York
14	3.30%	East Union Township	Pennsylvania
14	3.30%	Indian Hills	Colorado
15	3.20%	Ellis	Kansas
15	3.20%	Harbor Isle	New York

=== U.S. communities with the most residents born in Austria ===
The U.S. communities where born Austrians make up more than 1% of the total population are:

1. Hillside Lake, New York 1.4%
2. Redway, California 1.3%
3. Black Diamond, Florida 1.2%
4. Smallwood, New York 1.2%
5. Highland Beach, Florida 1.2%
6. Cordova, Maryland 1.2%
7. Keystone, Colorado 1.2%
8. North Lynbrook, New York 1.1%
9. Cedar Glen Lakes, New Jersey 1.1%
10. Center City, Minnesota 1.1%
11. Scotts Corners, New York 1.0%
12. Killington, Vermont 1.0%
13. Lexington, New York 1.0%
14. Tuxedo Park, New York 1.0%

== Notable people ==
=== Entertainment ===
- Woody Allen (born Allan Stewart Konigsberg) – actor, director, screenwriter, comedian, author, playwright, and musician
- Gabrielle Anwar – actress
- Bea Arthur (born Bernice Franke), actress, comedienne, and singer
- Adele Astaire (born Adele Austerlitz) – dancer, actress, sister of Fred Astaire
- Fred Astaire (born Frederick Austerlitz) – dancer, actor
- Sean Astin – actor
- Roseanne Barr, actress, comedian, writer, and producer
- Roger Bart, actor and singer.
- David Benioff (born David Friedman), writer and producer.
- Bibi Besch – actress
- Theodore Bikel – actor, singer, musician
- Peter Bogdanovich – director, writer, actor, producer, critic and film historian
- Abigail Breslin, actress
- Spencer Breslin, actor and songwriter.
- Albert Brooks (born Albert Lawrence Einstein), actor, director, and screenwriter
- Pauline Chalamet, American-French actress and producer
- Timothée Hal Chalamet, French-American actor and film producer
- Hans Conried – actor
- Ricardo Cortez (born Jacob Krantz) – silent film actor, of Austrian Jewish descent
- Stanley Cortez (born Stanislaus Kranz) – cinematographer
- Bryan Cranston, actor.
- Billy Crystal – actor, comedian, and filmmaker
- Robert von Dassanowsky – academic, writer and film producer
- Alden Ehrenreich, actor
- Norman Fell (born Norman Feld), actor of film and television
- Max Fleischer – animator
- Richard Fleischer – director, son of Max Fleischer
- Zsa Zsa Gabor, Hungarian-American socialite and actress
- Teri Garr – actress, comedian, dancer and voice artist
- Jeff Goldblum – actor and musician
- Alex Hafner – actor
- Colin Hanks, actor and filmmaker.
- Mark Harmon – actor
- Kurt Kasznar (born Kurt Servischer) – Austrian-born American actor
- Larry King (born Lawrence Zeiger), author, radio host and television host
- Stanley Kubrick – director, producer, screenwriter, and photographer
- Hedy Lamarr (born Hedwig Kiesler) – actress, inventor, and producer; from an Austrian Jewish family
- Martin Landau, actor.
- Elissa Landi – actress
- Fritz Lang – director
- Jennifer Jason Leigh, actress
- Lotte Lenya (born Karoline Blamauer) – actress, singer and diseuse
- Peter Lorre (born László Löwenstein) – actor
- Joe Manganiello – actor, grandmother was of Austrian descent
- Julianna Margulies, actress
- Samantha Mathis – actress, daughter of Bibi Besch
- T.J. Miller, stand-up comedian, actor, producer, and screenwriter
- Zero Mostel, actor, comedian, and singer
- Paul Muni (born Frederich Meier Weisenfreund) – actor
- Arthur Murray (born Moses Teichman) – dancer, entrepreneur
- Suzanne Pleshette, actress
- Natalie Portman (born Natalie Hershlag) – actress, born to a Jewish family, some of whom came from Austria
- Otto Preminger – director
- Carl Reiner, actor, author, comedian, director and screenwriter
- Leah Remini – actress, mother has Austrian Jewish descent
- Don Rickles – actor and comedian, of Jewish descent
- Tanya Roberts (born Victoria Blum), actress
- Eli Roth, film director, screenwriter, producer, and actor
- Lionel Royce (born Leon Moriz Reiss), actor of stage and screen
- Fritzi Scheff – actress
- Joseph Schildkraut – actor
- Arnold Schwarzenegger – actor and 38th Governor of California
- Patrick Schwarzenegger – actor, son of Arnold, brother of Katherine Schwarzenegger
- Amanda Setton, actress.
- Harry Shearer – actor
- Lilia Skala (born Lilia Sofer) – actress
- Walter Slezak – actor
- Howard Stern, broadcaster and media personality.
- Eric Stonestreet – actor, original family name before World War I was Steingassner
- Edgar G. Ulmer – director
- Erich von Stroheim – director
- Josef von Sternberg – director
- Tessa Gräfin von Walderdorff – American socialite, writer, and actress who is a member of the Austrian noble family Walderdorff
- Johnny Weissmuller, Johann Peter Weißmüller (Johnny Weissmüller) - actor ("Tarzan")
- Billy Wilder (born Samuel Wilder) – director, of Jewish descent
- Shelley Winters (born Shirley Schrift) – actress, of Jewish descent
- Elijah Wood – actor
- Ian Ziering, actor
- Fred Zinnemann – director

=== Music ===
- Walter Arlen (born Walter Aptowitzer) – composer, music critic at the Los Angeles Times
- Elmer Bernstein – composer and conductor
- Hal David, lyricist
- Arthur Fiedler, conductor
- G-Eazy (born 1989) – rapper
- Marvin Hamlisch, composer and conductor
- James Horner, film composer and conductor
- Erich Wolfgang Korngold – composer and conductor
- Erich Leinsdorf (born Erich Landauer) – conductor
- Bobby Schayer – musician
- Arnold Schoenberg – composer, of Jewish descent
- Max Steiner – composer
- Richard Stöhr (born Richard Stern), composer, music author, and teacher.
- Nita Strauss – rock guitarist
- Georg Ludwig von Trapp – headed the Austrian singing family portrayed in The Sound of Music. His exploits at sea in World War I earned him numerous decorations.
- Agathe von Trapp – eldest daughter of Baron Georg von Trapp and Agathe Whitehead von Trapp, The von Trapp Family from The Sound of Music
- Maria F. von Trapp – second-oldest daughter of Baron Georg von Trapp and Agathe Whitehead von Trapp, The von Trapp Family from The Sound of Music
- Werner von Trapp – second-oldest son of Georg Ritter von Trapp and Agathe Whitehead von Trapp, The von Trapp Family from The Sound of Music
- Joe Zawinul – jazz pianist

=== Arts & literature ===
- Maria Altmann – art collector
- Gustav Bergmann – philosopher
- Bela Borsodi – photographer
- Art Buchwald, humorist
- Eric de Kolb – painter and designer
- Felix de Weldon – sculptor, best known for the Marine Corps War Memorial
- Victor Gruen – architect and designer of shopping malls
- Raul Hillberg – author, political scientist and historian, who is widely considered to be one of the world's preeminent scholars of the Holocaust
- Jerry Iger – famed American cartoonist, founder of Eisner & Iger, an industry trailblazer during the Golden Age of Comics; born to an Austrian-Jewish family in New York City and Bob Iger's paternal great-uncle
- Otto Kallir (born Otto Nirenstein), art historian, author, publisher, and gallerist.
- David Karfunkle – painter, muralist
- Greta Kempton – artist
- Joseph Keppler – cartoonist, best known for the illustrated magazine Puck
- Jack Kirby – cartoon artist
- Vivian Maier – street photographer
- Eric Kandel – neuroscientist
- Gerda Lerner (née Kronstein), historian and woman's history author
- Richard Neutra – architect
- Frederick Burr Opper – cartoonist
- Sylvia Plath – poet, mother of Austrian descent
- Katherine Schwarzenegger – author, daughter of Arnold Schwarzenegger, sister of Patrick Schwarzenegger
- Franz Werfel, novelist, playwright, and poet

=== Journalism ===
- Gene Siskel – critic, journalist
- Michael Smerconish – CNN journalist
- Matthew Winter – journalist

=== Science and medicine ===
==== Economics ====
- Alexander Gerschenkron, economic historian and professor at Harvard University
- Friedrich von Hayek – Austrian-born economist and philosopher
- Ludwig Heinrich Edler von Mises – economist, philosopher, author and classical liberal
- Joseph Warkany – pediatrician

==== Medicine ====
- Godfrey Edward Arnold – medical doctor and researcher
- Karl Landsteiner – biologist and physician, best known for having distinguished the main blood groups
- Ignatz Leo Nascher – doctor and gerontologist

==== Physics ====
- Heinz von Foerster – scientist combining physics and philosophy, originator of Second-order cybernetics
- Wolfgang Pauli – theoretical physicist and pioneer of quantum physics, received the Nobel Prize in Physics.
- Victor Frederick Weisskopf – physicist of Jewish descent. During World War II, he worked at Los Alamos on the Manhattan Project to develop the atomic bomb, and later campaigned against the proliferation of nuclear weapons; medal received in 1979

==== Psychology ====
- Bruno Bettelheim – child psychologist, psychoanalyst and concentration camp survivor
- Ernest Dichter, psychologist and marketing expert known as the "father of motivational research".
- Heinz Kohut, psychoanalyst best known for his development of self psychology
- Walter Mischel – psychologist specializing in personality theory and social psychology; professor at Columbia University
- Wilhelm Reich – psychiatrist
- Paul Watzlawick – psychologist, communications theorist, and philosopher

==== Sociology ====
- Peter L. Berger – sociologist
- Peter Blau, sociologist and theorist.
- Paul Lazarsfeld, sociologist and mathematician; founder of Columbia University's Bureau of Applied Social Research
- Alfred Schütz – philosopher/sociologist

==== Other ====
- Carl Djerassi – chemist, novelist, and playwright
- Irene Fischer, mathematician and geodesist.
- Kurt Gödel – logician, mathematician, philosopher
- Hans Holzer – paranormal researcher and author

=== Law ===
- Felix Frankfurter – U.S. Supreme Court Justice
- Ruth Bader Ginsburg – U.S. Supreme Court Justice
- Fred F. Herzog – only Jewish judge in Austria between the world wars, he fled to America and became Dean of two different law schools
- Hans Kelsen – jurist
- Richard Posner, legal scholar and judge on the U.S. Court of Appeals for the Seventh Circuit

=== Politics ===
- Victor L. Berger – socialist politician and journalist
- Barbara Boxer (née Levy), US Senator and member of the US House of Representatives
- Dagmar Braun Celeste, former First Lady of Ohio
- Henry Ellenbogen – U.S. Congressman from Pennsylvania
- John Kerry – politician, current United States Special Presidential
  Envoy for Climate, former Senator from Massachusetts, U.S. presidential candidate of 2004 (D), former U.S. Secretary of State
- Joseph Lieberman, US senator
- Jacky Rosen (née Spekto), US senator and member of the House of Representatives
- Chuck Schumer, US senator
- Arthur Schneier, rabbi and human rights activist
- Kurt von Schuschnigg – Austrofascist politician and Austrian federal Chancellor 1936-1938 and professor of political sciences at St. Louis University 1948-1967
- Ernst Florian Winter – diplomat

=== Business and technology ===
- Edward Bernays – Austrian-American pioneer in public relations, referred to in his obituary as "the father of public relations".
- Michael Eisner – media executive, successive CEO of Paramount Pictures and the Walt Disney Company
- Anselm Franz – pioneering turbojet engineer, designer of the Jumo 004 and Lycoming T53 engines
- Joseph Gerber, inventor and businessman.
- Bob Iger – longtime CEO of the Walt Disney Company, who oversaw a fourfold increase in its market capitalization; born in New York City to a Jewish family, in particular an Austrian-Jewish father
- Travis Kalanick – founder, Uber Technologies; born in California to a family of Jewish-Austrian and Slovak-Austrian extraction
- Dylan Lauren, businesswoman
- Ernst Mahler – chemist and industrialist
- Jillian Michaels, fitness expert, nutritionist, businesswoman, media personality, and author.
- Roy Niederhoffer, hedge fund manager
- Wolfgang Puck – celebrity chef, restaurateur
- Martin Roscheisen – entrepreneur
- Howard Schultz, CEO of Starbucks
- Lewis Strauss. government official, businessman, philanthropist, and naval officer
- Elisha Wiesel, businessman and hedge fund manager.

=== Sports ===
==== American football ====
- Toni Fritsch - NFL player
- Mark Herzlich, sports commentator and former NFL football linebacker
- Joe Theismann – NFL quarterback, Super Bowl XVII champion

==== Baseball ====
- Richard von Foregger, Major League Baseball player
- Corey Kluber – Major League Baseball pitcher, 2014 Cy Young pitcher
- Mose Solomon ("Rabbi of Swat") – Major League Baseball player, of Jewish descent

==== Swimming ====
- Hedy Bienenfeld, also known after marriage as Hedy Wertheimer, Olympic swimmer
- Andrea Murez, Olympic swimmer
- Otto Wahle, Austrian-American Olympic medalist swimmer

==== Other ====
- Benny Feilhaber, professional soccer player
- Alfred Guth, water polo player, swimmer, and Olympic modern pentathlete.
- Sylven Landesberg, American-Israeli-Austrian professional basketball player
- Samuel Mosberg, Olympic champion boxer
- Joe Schilling – kickboxer
- Frank Spellman, machinist, photographer, and Olympic champion weightlifter.
- Eliot Teltscher – top-10 tennis player
- Ken Uston – blackjack player, strategist, and author
- Gunther - professional wrestler signed to WWE

== See also ==
- Austria–United States relations
- European American
- German Americans
- Swiss Americans
- Czech Texan
- Hyphenated American
- Journal of Austrian-American History
