= Robert von Dassanowsky =

American academic, producer, film and cultural historian (1965–2023)

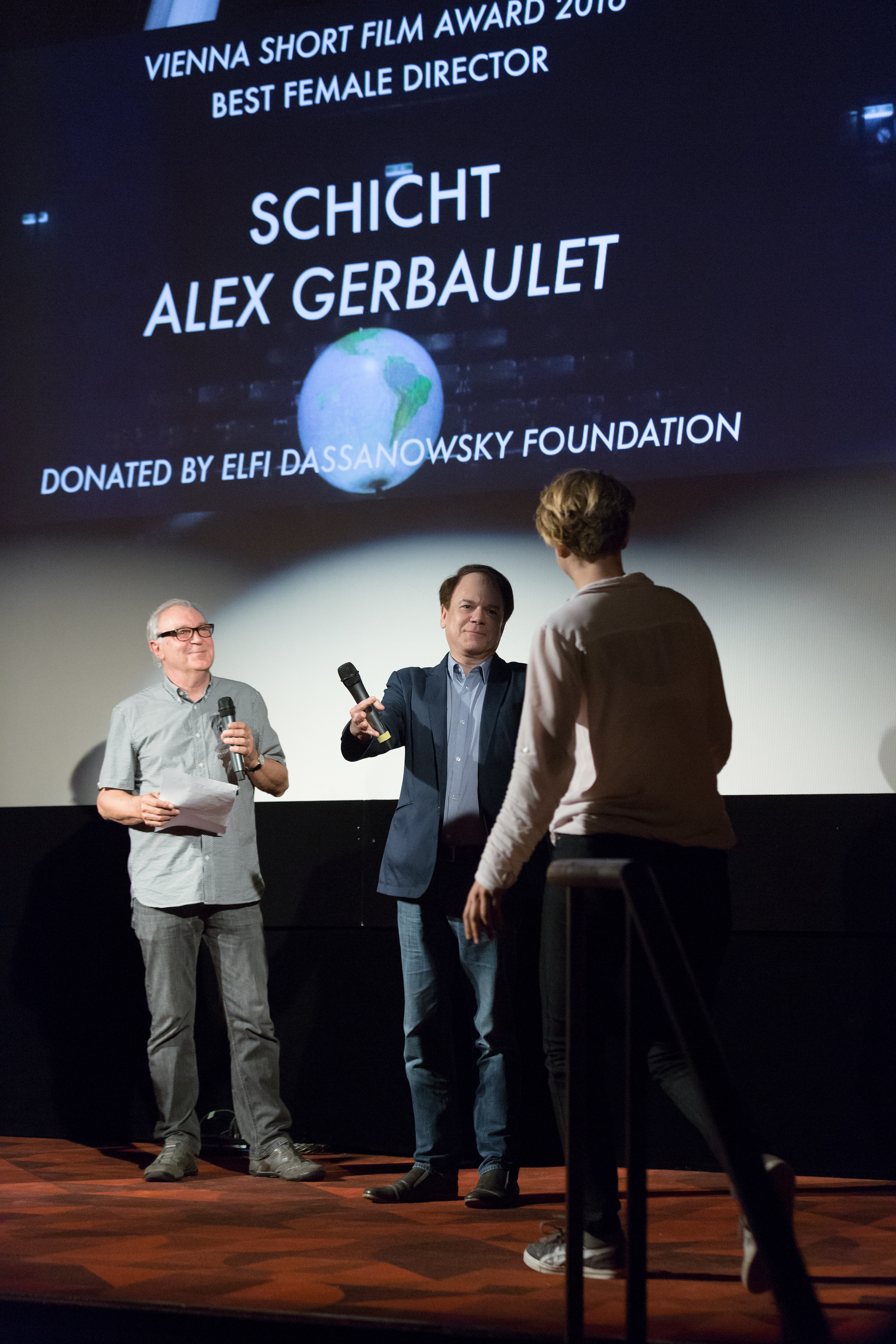
Dassanowsky (center) at Vienna Independent Shorts 2016

Robert von Dassanowsky FRHistS, FRSA (January 28, 1965 – October 10, 2023) was an Austrian-American academic, writer, film and cultural historian, and producer. He was usually known as Robert Dassanowsky.

== Education, career and publications ==
Dassanowsky was born in New York City on January 28, 1965 to Austrian-American pioneering film studio founder and musician Elfi von Dassanowsky. A student of the American Academy of Dramatic Arts and a graduate of UCLA (MA, PhD), where he also served as Visiting Professor of German, Dassanowsky was a widely published academician, independent film producer, playwright, and had written for television. He held dual American and Austrian citizenship.

Dassanowsky was named CU Distinguished Professor of Film and Austrian Studies by the University of Colorado System in November 2020. He was professor of German and Visual and Performing Arts, and founding director of film studies at the University of Colorado at Colorado Springs since 1993, and became particularly known for his influential scholarly work on Austrian author Alexander Lernet-Holenia, German filmmaker and photographer Leni Riefenstahl, and on Austrian and Central European film. He served as Adjunct Professor of Media Communication at Webster University Vienna and was an Affiliate Faculty of the Global Center for Advanced Studies (GCAS) New York since 2017 and member of the Board of Directors of the GCAS Research Institute Dublin since 2019.

Dassanowsky was founding president of the Colorado chapter of PEN and was a founding Vice President of the Austrian American Film Association (AAFA). Additionally, he was the Contributing Editor of the Gale Encyclopedia of Multicultural America, a Contributing Advisor to the International Dictionary of Films and Filmmakers, contributor to The Greenwood Encyclopedia of World Popular Cultures, and was the author of Austrian Cinema: A History (2005), the first English language survey of this national cinema. Among his other publications is a collection of essays on New Austrian Film edited with Oliver C. Speck (2011), edited collections on Hugo von Hofmannsthal's play Der Schwierige (Iudicium 2011), Quentin Tarantino's Inglourious Basterds: Manipulations of Metafilm (Continuum 2012), and on World Film Locations: Vienna (Intellect 2012). His study, Screening Transcendence: Film Under Austrofascism and the Hollywood Hope 1933–1938, was published by Indiana University Press in May 2018.

He served on several editorial and advisory boards of literary publications in the U.S., Canada, Austria and Poland, including Osiris, Rampike, Poetry Salzburg Review, Journal of Austrian Studies, Colloquia Germanica, Studia Germanica Posnaniensia of the Adam Mickiewicz University in Poznań and the Journal of Austrian-American History. In addition to publications in scholarly journals he was also a contributor to Senses of Cinema, Bright Lights Film Journal and The Vienna Review. His Telegrams from the Metropole: Selected Poems 1980–1998 received a Pushcart Prize nomination in 2000. His poetry book Soft Mayhem was published in 2010 (Poetry Salzburg). The English translation of Austrian playwright Felix Mitterer's treatment of the life of Nazi resister Jägerstätter by Gregor Thuswaldner and Dassanowsky (University of New Orleans Press 2015) received its American staged dramatic reading premiere under the direction of Guy Ben-Aharon at the Austrian Cultural Forum New York in December 2016. He authored over ninety articles and essays in book collections, journals, and periodicals.

== Producer and media appearances ==
Like his mother Elfi von Dassanowsky, he was also active as an independent producer and head of the Colorado/Vienna based Belvedere Film production company. His Belvedere Film projects included the documentary on aesthete Felix Pfeifle Felix Austria! a.k.a. The Archduke and Herbert Hinkel (2013) directed by Christine Beebe (in which he also appears), the dramatic shorts Menschen (2012) and The Retreat (2010), the feature film Wilson Chance (2005), and the award-winning Semmelweis (2001). Felix Austria! premiered at the 2013 Hot Docs Festival.

As an independent, he served as associate producer of Dog Eat Dog (2012) a comedy short with Zachary Quinto directed by Sian Heder, of Curt Hahn's dramatic feature Deadline with Eric Roberts (2012), of Mark Devendorf and Mauricio Chernovetzky's Styria a.k.a. Angels of Darkness based on Sheridan Le Fanu's gothic novel Carmilla starring Stephen Rea and Eleanor Tomlinson (2014), and of the feature biopic The Creep Behind the Camera directed by Pete Schuermann (2014). He was a producer of Brad Osborne and Eric Vale's independent mystery thriller feature, Chariot (2014), and produced Ally Acker's interview documentary on women in cinema history, Reel Herstory: The Real Story of Reel Women with Jodie Foster (2014). He was associate producer on the award-winning Canadian feature, Before Anything You Say (2016) directed by Shelagh Carter with cinematography by Ousama Rawi; producer on Matthias Greuling's Austrian documentary regarding author Thomas Bernhard, Der Bauer zu Nathal with Sunnyi Melles and Nicholas Ofczarek (2018), and associate producer and historical adviser on the biographical documentary feature, Paul Henreid: Beyond Victor Laszlo, directed by the Austro-Hollywood actor's daughter, Monika Henreid. The latter project remains in progress. Following, he co-produced the feature documentary on the German-Austrian-American performer, poet, filmmaker, artist and member of the Beat Generation, Ruth Weiss, directed by Thomas Antonic: One More Step West is the Sea: Ruth Weiss (2021).

== Affiliations, awards and foundation work ==
Dassanowsky was a member of Mensa (U.S.A.) and the Sacred Military Constantinian Order of Saint George (Spanish branch). He was named the Carnegie Foundation/CASE U.S. Professor of the Year for Colorado in 2004, and decorated by the Austrian president in 2005 with the Decoration of Honour in Silver for Services to the Republic of Austria. Dassanowsky received the University of Colorado, Colorado Springs Outstanding Teacher Award in 2001, the Chancellor's Award in 2006, and the Faculty Award for Excellence in Research in 2013. He was elected Fellow of the Royal Historical Society in 2007, and of the Royal Society of Arts in 2010. A member of the European Academy of Sciences and Arts since 2001, he was appointed to serve as one of the three U.S. delegates to the Academy in 2009. In 2012 Dassanowsky was appointed member of the European Society Coudenhove-Kalergi, which furthers the work and image of the founder of the Paneuropean Movement and he joined the board of advisors for the Salzburg Institute of Religion, Culture and the Arts in 2014 and the Board of the American Friends of the Documentation Center of Austrian Resistance (DÖW) in 2016.

He was a member of the Academy of Austrian Film and a voting member of the European Film Academy. Dassanowsky was elected vice president of the Austrian Studies Association or ASA in 2010, which he and then organization president David Luft (Oregon State University) transitioned from the Modern Austrian Literature and Culture Association in 2010–12. He served as ASA president from 2012 – 2014. The Botstiber Institute for Austrian-American Studies (BIAAS) awarded Dassanowsky a research grant for 2014–15, and he presented the Seventh Annual Botstiber Lecture on Austrian-American Affairs at the Austrian Embassy in Washington DC on May 29, 2015. He was the recipient of the University of Colorado's 2015 Thomas Jefferson Award and was named an Ethics Fellow by the Daniels Fund Ethics Initiative (DFEI) Collegiate Program for 2020 – 2021. From 2008, he was the director of the Elfi von Dassanowsky Foundation, established in memory of his mother. In addition to various other grants, the Foundation annually sponsors the juried Elfi Dassanowsky Prize (1,000 Euros) for a work by a female filmmaker, which was first presented to Norwegian artist Inger Lise Hansen for Parallax (2009) at the Vienna Independent Shorts Film Festival in June 2010.

Dassanowsky's death was announced by the University of Colorado, Colorado Springs on October 12, 2023, two days after his death from undisclosed causes at age 58.

== See also ==
- List of Austrian writers
