= University of Pennsylvania Press =

Books publisher

- Parent company: University of Pennsylvania
- Status: Active
- Founded: March 26, 1890; 136 years ago
- Country of origin: United States
- Headquarters location: 3819 Chestnut Street, Philadelphia, Pennsylvania, U.S.
- Distribution: Hopkins Fulfillment Services (the Americas); Scholarly Book Services (Canada); Combined Academic Publishers (Europe, Asia, Africa, Australasia)
- Publication types: Books, magazine, journals
- Official website: www.pennpress.org

The University of Pennsylvania Press (also known as Penn Press) is a university press affiliated with the University of Pennsylvania, a private, Ivy League university in Philadelphia, Pennsylvania.

== History ==
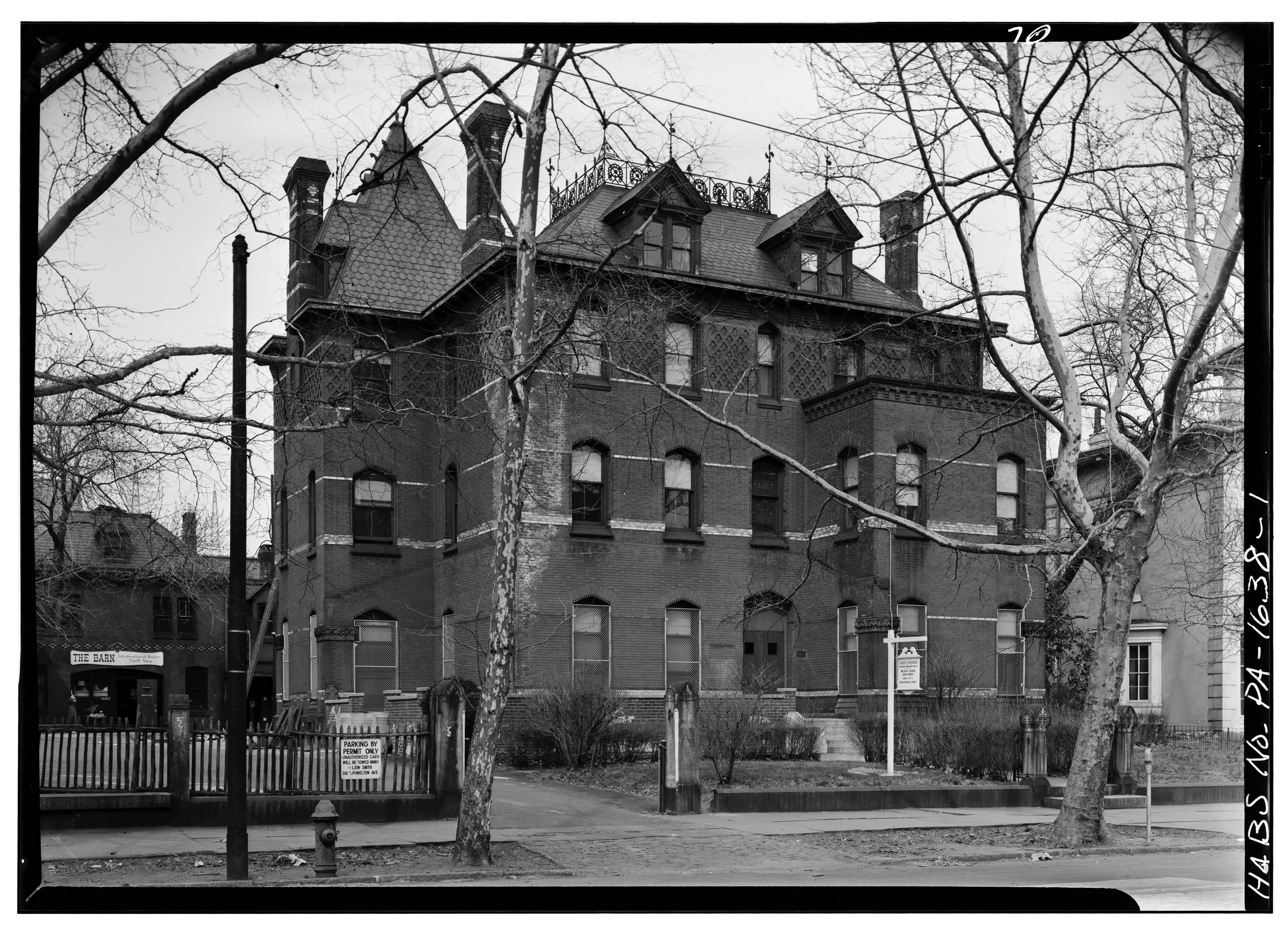
The Potts House at 3905 Spruce Street in Philadelphia. A mid-nineteenth century villa, it served as home of the Press from 2005 to 2025

The press was originally incorporated with by the Pennsylvania state government on March 26, 1890, and the imprint of the University of Pennsylvania Press first appeared on publications in the 1890s, among the earliest such imprints in America. One of the press's first book publications, published in 1899, was The Philadelphia Negro: A Social Study, written by black reformer, scholar, and social critic W. E. B. Du Bois.

University of Pennsylvania Press has an active backlist of roughly 2,000 titles and an annual output of upward of 120 new books in a focused editorial program. It focuses heavily on publishing works related to American history and culture, ancient, medieval, and Renaissance studies, anthropology, landscape architecture, studio arts, human rights, Jewish studies, and political science. The press also publishes 27 peer-reviewed academic journals, mostly in the humanities, and the magazine Dissent.

As of July 2023, Wharton School Press is an imprint of University of Pennsylvania Press.

The University of Pennsylvania Press, Inc. is a nonprofit Pennsylvania corporation wholly owned by the University of Pennsylvania, which maintains nonprofit tax status under Section 501(c)(3) of the United States Code.

From 2005 until 2025, the University of Pennsylvania Press was based at 3905 Spruce Street in Philadelphia, known as the Potts House, built by the Wilson Brothers & Company architecture firm in 1876. The house previously served as both the headquarters of International House Philadelphia and WXPN. As of 2026, the Press is housed in the Saint Leonard's Court building on Chestnut Street, which it shares with several other Penn departments and administrative offices.

== See also ==
- List of English-language book publishing companies
- List of university presses
- Journal of Austrian-American History
