= Wolner =

Wølner or Wolner is a rare Norwegian surname that originated in Germany. The Norwegian Wolners main ancestor are Jacob Wølner that migrated to Kongsberg in Norway on order of the King of Norway and the Emperor of Germany to help with the Kongsberg silver mines.

Today the most of American Wolners come from the Norwegian name Wølner. The most Wolners now live in the U.S. and Canada, and most of them have ancestors from Norway after some of the Norwegian Wolners migrated to North America around the start of the 20th century.

- Jan Wølner, Norwegian composer, see Melodi Grand Prix
- Stefan Wolner, Austrian filmmaker, see Vienna Independent Shorts
