= Elfi von Dassanowsky =

Austrian-born pianist, soprano, film producer (1924–2007)

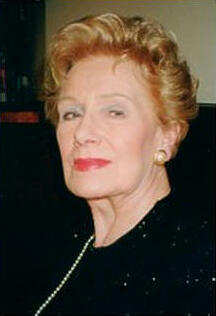
- Elfi von Dassanowsky, 2000
- Born: Elfriede Maria Elisabeth Charlotte Dassanowsky; February 2, 1924; Vienna, Austria
- Died: October 2, 2007 (aged 83); Los Angeles, California, U.S.
- Citizenship: Austrian; American
- Occupations: Film producer, opera singer, pianist, educator
- Years active: 1942–2007

Elfriede "Elfi" von Dassanowsky (February 2, 1924 – October 2, 2007) was an Austrian-born American singer, pianist, and film producer.

== Early life ==
Elfi von Dassanowsky (also known as Elfi Dassanowsky or Elfriede Dassanowsky) was born Elfriede Maria Elisabeth Charlotte Dassanowsky in Vienna, the daughter of Franz Leopold von Dassanowsky, a civil servant in the Austrian Trade Ministry, and Anna (née Grünwald). A piano prodigy at the age of 5, Elfi attended the Vienna Institute of the Blessed Virgin Mary (known as the "Institut der Englischen Fräulein") and became at age 15, the youngest woman admitted to Vienna's Academy of Music and Performing Arts to that date as the protégé of concert pianist, Emil von Sauer. While a student, film director Karl Hartl chose her to instruct Curd Jürgens in piano, so that he could play the instrument on screen in Hartl's Mozart biopic and a Willi Forst musical, Operetta. But Dassanowsky's studies and early career were halted for extended labor service when she rejected membership in Nazi organizations. The powerful UFA Studio in Berlin offered her a film contract in late 1944, which she also declined.

== Career ==
In 1946, von Dassanowsky made her opera debut as Susanna in Mozart's The Marriage of Figaro at the Stadttheater St. Pölten and created in concerts for the Allied High Command.

Dassanowsky remains one of the few women in film history, and at age 22 one of the youngest, to co-found a film studio, Belvedere-Film, the first new studio facility in postwar Vienna. With senior partners August Diglas and Emmerich Hanus, the studio created such German-language classics as Die Glücksmühle (The Mill of Happiness, 1946), Dr. Rosin (1949), and Märchen vom Glück (Kiss Me, Casanova, 1949), and gave Gunther Philipp and Nadja Tiller their first screen roles.

Dassanowsky starred in operas, operettas, theatrical dramas and comedies, helped initiate several theater groups, was announcer for Allied Forces Broadcasting and the BBC, toured West Germany in a one-woman-show and gave master classes in voice and piano.

During this period, Dassanowsky also modeled exclusively for Austrian painter Franz Xaver Wolf (1896–1990), whose work featuring her image is now in museum and private collections.

Through art director Federico Pallavicini, Dassanowsky encouraged an issue of the short-lived American magazine, Flair (edited by Fleur Cowles) to cover the arts in postwar Vienna, and modeled for the planned edition, but the publication folded before print. An expert in the Paderewski piano technique, her musical pedagogy continued in the 1950s in Canada and New York, where she also married and had a son and daughter.

At this time Dassanowsky turned to design and created a prototype for woman's leather day coat, which is now in the collection of the Museum of Applied Arts, Vienna. She divorced in the late 1970s and although she never remarried, she was briefly linked with author and actor, Prince Heinrich Starhemberg (aka Henry Gregor, 1934–1997) in the mid 1990s until his death.

In Hollywood in the 1960s, she resisted becoming a trendy Euro-starlet and preferred to remain behind the camera as a vocal coach for director/producer Otto Preminger. In 1962, she became a naturalized citizen of the United States. A successful Los Angeles businesswoman, in 1999, she re-established Belvedere-Film as a Los Angeles/Vienna-based production company with her son, Robert. She was executive producer of the award-winning dramatic short film, Semmelweis (2001), the spy-comedy, Wilson Chance (2005), and several works in progress at the time of her death, including the documentary Felix Austria! aka The Archduke and Herbert Hinkel (2013), and a screen adaptation (with her son) of the antiwar Austrian novel, Mars im Widder by Alexander Lernet-Holenia.

Recognized internationally for her work as a pioneering woman in film production and as a multi-talent in postwar Austrian arts and culture, von Dassanowsky is the only Austrian woman to receive the Women's International Center's Living Legacy Award, and has been honored with the UNESCO Mozart Medal, the Decoration of Merit in Gold for Services to the Republic of Austria, the French Ordre des Arts et des Lettres, the Austrian Film Archive's Lifetime Achievement Medal, by the State of California and the cities of Vienna and Los Angeles, where von Dassanowsky lived since 1962. Additionally, she is reported to have been nominated for the honorary Right Livelihood Award in the late 1990s.

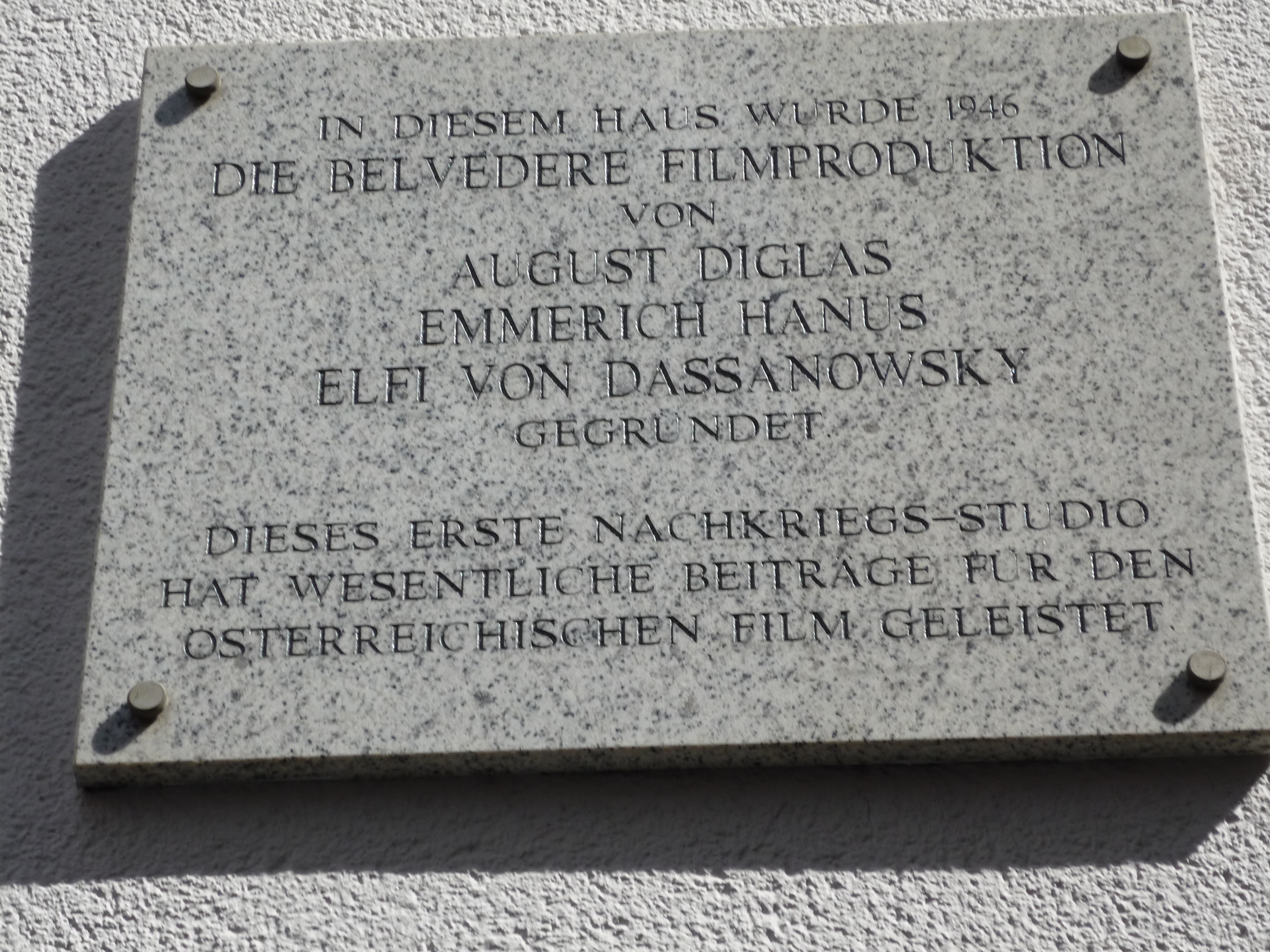
Belvedere-Film Studio plaque, Vienna

== Death ==
While in Kona, Hawaii, in July 2007, Dassanowsky suffered a life-threatening embolism. She was flown to Queens Hospital in Honolulu and part of her left leg had to be amputated. She was reported to be recovering well in rehabilitation in Los Angeles and was expected to continue her efforts in film production as well as arts and UNESCO promotion. According to news reports, amputee celebrity Heather Mills (Lady McCartney) took a personal interest in her rehabilitation. However, Dassanowsky died October 2, 2007, in Los Angeles of heart failure. She was interred in a grave of honor (German: Ehrengrab) at the Vienna Central Cemetery on July 25, 2008.

== Foundation and posthumous recognition ==
In November 2007, the planned establishment of the Elfi von Dassanowsky Foundation was announced in Vienna. It would continue the pioneering and creative spirit of the late artist by developing awards and grants for emerging women filmmakers. The first phase of this project was complete in late January 2009, when the Elfi von Dassanowsky Fund initiated its program of charitable contributions to non-profit organizations in the U.S. and Europe.

The Elfi von Dassanowsky Rose (a tea-rose – floribunda hybrid) also known as the "Elfi" was created by Brad Jalbert of Canada in 2009. It was included in the Peggy Rockefeller Rose Garden at the New York Botanical Garden in Spring 2013.

The first Elfi von Dassanowsky Prize for work by female filmmakers was presented to Norwegian artist Inger Lise Hansen for Parallax (2009) at the Vienna Independent Shorts Film Festival in June 2010.

A minor planet/asteroid, 4495 Dassanowsky, discovered in 1988 by Japanese astronomers Masaru Arai and Hiroshi Mori, was named in her honor in 2014.

She was named an Honorary Member of the Association of Austrian Film Producers (AAFP) posthumously in September 2018.
