= Günter Bischof =

Austrian-American historian

Günter Bischof (born 6 October 1953) is an Austrian-American historian and university professor. A specialist in 20th century diplomatic history, and a graduate of University of New Orleans, Innsbruck University and Harvard University, he is a Marshall Plan Professor of History at the University of New Orleans. He also serves on the editorial board of the Journal of Austrian-American History.
