= Austrian Studies Association =

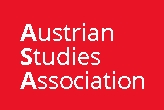
- Formation: 1961
- Type: Professional association
- Legal status: 501 (c) (3)
- Location: United States
- Members: 400
- President: Michael Burri
- Website: www.austrian-studies.org

The Austrian Studies Association or ASA (formerly the Modern Austrian Literature and Culture Association or MALCA, with its journal Modern Austrian Literature) continues traditions started in 1961 (originally the International Arthur Schnitzler Research Association), as the only North American association devoted to scholarship on all aspects of Austrian and Austrian-associated cultural life and history from the eighteenth century to the present.

The association publishes a quarterly scholarly journal, the Journal of Austrian Studies and holds an international annual spring conference, organized around a theme with open sessions. Its other activities include organizing scholarly panels for the annual conventions of the Modern Language Association, the German Studies Association, and at other national and international conferences. Current news and resources of interest are included on its website and distributed through its list-serv, Twitter account, and Facebook page. The Austrian Studies Association is a member of the American Council of Learned Societies.

== Recent history ==
From 1971 through 1999, prior to its incarnation as the Modern Austrian Literature and Culture Association in 2000, the journal Modern Austrian Literature hosted annual conferences at the University of California, Riverside (UCR) under the auspices of editor and UCR German Studies professor/chair Donald G. Daviau and secretary-treasurer Jorun Johns (California State University, San Bernardino), publisher of Ariadne Press, the California-based scholarly publication house for Austrian critical studies and works in translation. The ASA originated in a referendum held in early 2011, when MALCA's membership voted to change the association's name and to retitle its journal as the Journal of Austrian Studies. These changes acknowledge what has long been the association's identity: an interdisciplinary organization that welcomes all eras and disciplines of Austrian studies at its conferences and in its journal, including scholarship on the cultures of Austria's earlier political forms (Holy Roman Empire, Austrian Empire, and Austria-Hungary) and scholarship that acknowledges this region's historical multi-ethnic, multilingual, and transcultural identities and their legacies in the present.

As of 1 January 2010, the ASA/MALCA also assumed the role heretofore played by the American Grillparzer Society as liaison to the Austrian Grillparzer Gesellschaft, located in Vienna and the sponsor of conferences and a yearbook. The revision of the association and its publication was initiated by former presidents David Luft (Oregon State University) (2010–12) and Robert Dassanowsky (University of Colorado, Colorado Springs) (2012–14), together with Imke Meyer (2014–16), Craig Decker (2016-2017) and Gregor Thuswaldner (2017-2020). Early board members of the ASA included Bruno Walter and Olga Schnitzler, with Heinrich Schnitzler serving as the first vice president. The current president of the ASA (2020-2022) is Michael Burri.

== Honorary Members ==
As of 2014, the ASA has granted honorary membership to the following prominent Austrian artistic and cultural figures as well as museum directors: Ruth Beckermann, Valie Export, Lilian Faschinger, Paul Harather, Josef Haslinger, Peter Henisch, Agnes Husslein-Arco, Elfriede Jelinek, Barbara Neuwirth, Hans Raimund, Goetz Spielmann, Peter Rosei, Peter Tscherkassky, Matti Bunzl, Michael Loebenstein, Christoph Thun-Hohenstein.

== Recent Conferences ==
MALCA/ASA conferences have been held at the following venues since the turn of century: 1999 and 2001: Lafayette College, Easton, PA; 2002: University of Pennsylvania, Philadelphia, PA; 2004: Rice University, Houston, TX; 2005: University of Montana, Missoula, MT; 2006: Wake Forest University, Winston-Salem, NC; 2007: University of Alberta, Edmonton, Canada; 2008: University of Washington, Seattle, WA; 2009: Emory University, Atlanta, GA; 2010: University of Vienna, Austria; 2011: Washington & Jefferson College, Washington, PA; 2012: California State University, Long Beach, CA; 2013: University of Waterloo, Canada; 2014: AT&T Conference Center and University of Texas, Austin, TX; 2015: University of Michigan, Dearborn, MI; 2016: University of Vienna/Elfriede Jelinek Research Center, Vienna, Austria; 2017: University of Illinois at Chicago; 2018: University of Vermont, Burlington, VT; 2019: Bowling Green State University, Ohio; 2021: Adam Mickiewicz University, Poznań, Poland, and 2022 Center Austria at the University of New Orleans.

The Jutta Landa Travel Fund (named after Austrian scholar Jutta Landa McLaughlin, 1945–2003, University of California, Los Angeles). The Austrian Cultural Forum New York, the Austrian Marshall Plan Foundation, and the Botstiber Institute for Austrian-American Studies have provided travel assistance to graduate students and post-doctoral scholars attending association events.

== Journal of Austrian Studies ==
The Journal of Austrian Studies, produced and distributed by the University of Nebraska Press, is a peer-reviewed, interdisciplinary quarterly that publishes scholarly articles and book reviews on all aspects of the history and culture of Austria and the former Habsburg territories. It is the flagship publication of the Austrian Studies Association and contains contributions in German and English from leading international scholars in the field of Austrian studies.

The journal highlights scholarly work that draws on innovative methodologies and new ways of viewing Austrian history and culture. The journal was renamed in 2012 to reflect the increasing scope and diversity of its scholarship, and appeared previously for nearly a half century as Modern Austrian Literature and, prior to that, The Journal of the International Arthur Schnitzler Research Association.

Its current editors are Todd Herzog (University of Cincinnati) and Hillary Hope Herzog (University of Kentucky), who complete their term in 2020, to be followed by Peter Meilaender (Houghton College) and Anita McChesney (Texas Tech University). The book review editor is Joseph W. Moser (West Chester University), and the editorial board includes prominent Austrianists and Germanists from the U.S., UK, Canada, Austria, and Germany, who represent a variety of area studies. The Max Kade Foundation funds an annual Max Kade Prize for Best Article published in the journal, awarded at the conference of the ASA. The winner of the $1500 award is identified from among the articles published in the journal that year, based on a poll of the editorial board.

== See also ==
- Austria
- Austrian Culture
- Austrian Literature
- Austrian Cinema
- History of Austria
- Journal of Austrian-American History
- Music of Austria
