= Gary B. Cohen =

American historian (born 1948)

Gary Bennett Cohen (born 26 October 1948) is an American historian.

== Life ==
Gary B. Cohen studied at the University of Southern California (B.A., 1970) and Princeton University (M.A., 1972; Ph.D., 1975). Between 1976 and 2001, he worked at the University of Oklahoma. Since 2001, he has been working at the University of Minnesota. Between 2010 and 2013, he was the chair of the Department of History, University of Minnesota. He focuses on social development, ethnic group relations, and education in Austria and the Czech lands in the 19th and 20th centuries. Cohen is also interested in modern European Jewish history and ethnic minorities in modern Europe. He also serves on the editorial board of the Journal of Austrian-American History.

== Works ==
- The Politics of Ethnic Survival: Germans in Prague, 1861-1914 (Princeton University Press, 1981). Second revised edition, 2006.
- Education and Middle-Class Society in Imperial Austria, 1848-1918 (Purdue University Press, 1996)
