= Eric de Kolb =

Austrian artist (1916–2001)

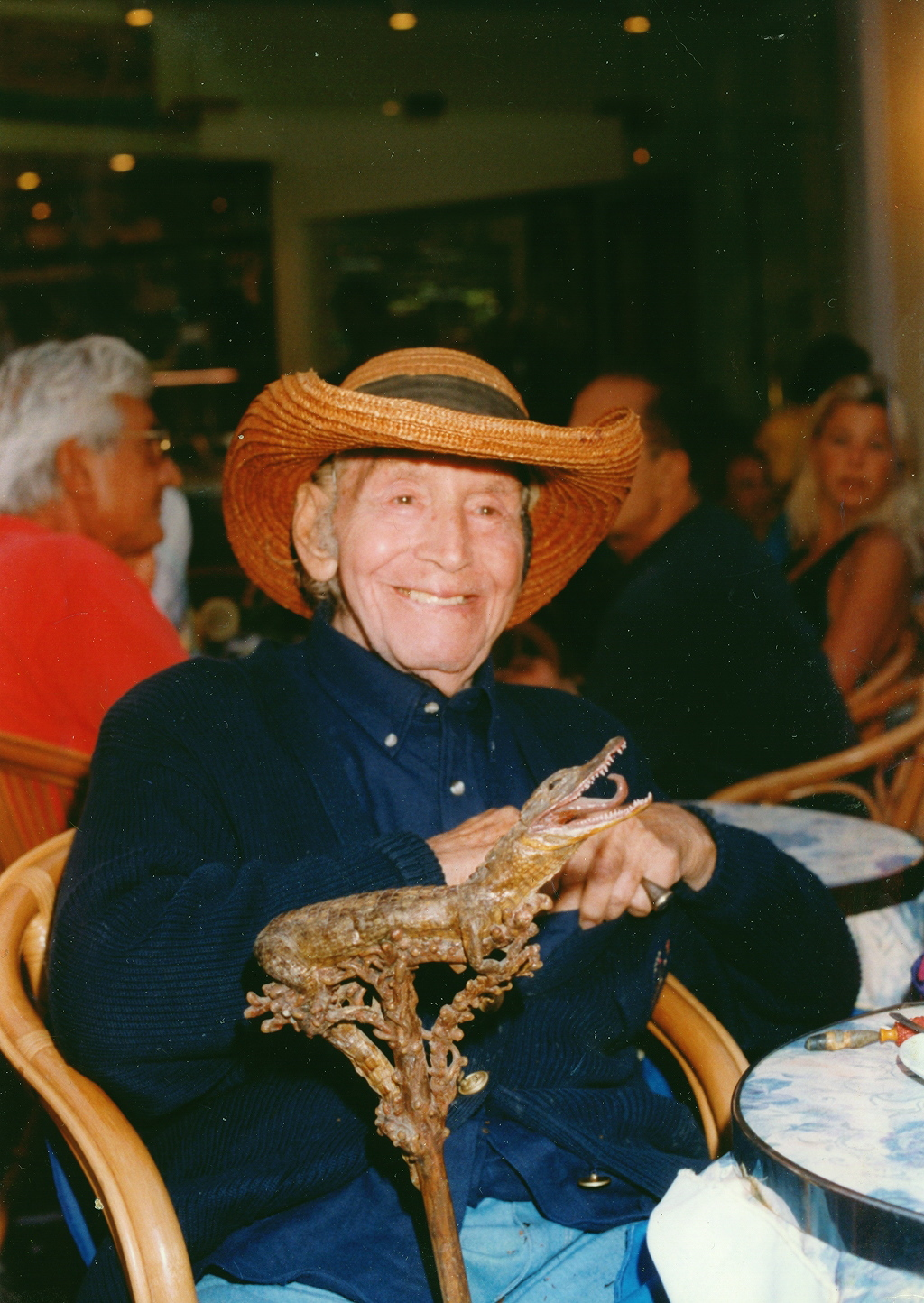
- Eric de Kolb in Capri. The cane he is holding is one of his many original designer canes.
- Born: Eric de Kolb-Wartenberg; March 10, 1916; Vienna
- Died: April 14, 2001 (aged 85); New York City
- Education: The Academy of Arts in Vienna, Ecole des Beaux Arts
- Known for: Painting Sculpture Fashion Design
- Title: Baron
- Movement: Surrealism

Eric de Kolb (March 10, 1916 – April 14, 2001) was an Austrian-born surrealistic artist, painter, sculptor, jewelry and fashion designer, commercial artist, and package designer. He was born in Vienna in 1916 and died in New York City in 2001. His artistic skills were diverse; his surrealistic paintings were created in a vast array of styles, and his mini sculptures were created in many different styles and materials.

Eric de Kolb and his wife had homes in New York City and on the Isle of Capri.

== Life ==
Eric de Kolb (Baron Eric de Kolb-Wartenberg) grew up in an aristocratic Viennese family. Both his father and grandfather were art collectors. Eric de Kolb became a well-known artist, famous for his fashion designs, jewelry designs, miniature sculptures, paintings, and commercial art packaging.

== Career ==
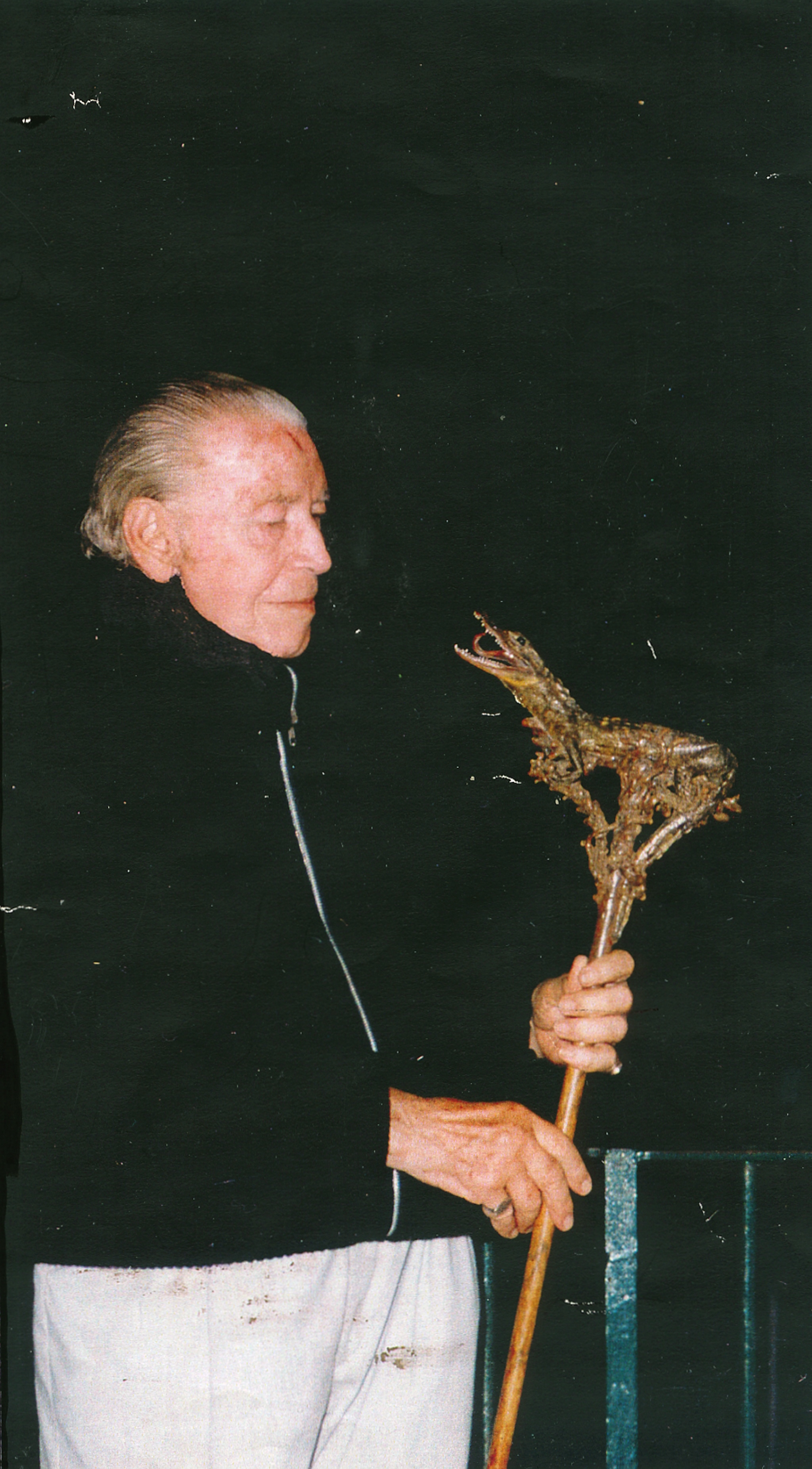
Eric de Kolb

De Kolb began designing when he was 5 or 6. His father had ordered an artist to paint a scene on the ceiling. Young de Kolb decided to draw something that he knew would look much better. He made designs of Poseidon and mermaids and showed them to his father. His father decided to give him art lessons. His first teacher was Otto Koening, a famous sculptor who was 80 years old at that time and had a long white beard. He told de Kolb "You make my portrait and I'll make yours." When de Kolb finished the portrait, Koening said, "Wonderful, you have talent." De Kolb studied with Koening until Koening's death, four years later.

Koenig had recommended his student to the Rector of The Academy of Arts in Vienna. Later de Kolb studied at The Ecole des Beaux Arts in Paris. In World War II he served with the French Marines as a lieutenant. Even in service he designed clothes for such fashion greats as Lucien Lelong, Balenciaga, Elsa Schiaparelli, and others. He said, "When I was demobilized, I couldn't believe that France had lost the war. It was like the husband whose wife was unfaithful — he's always the last to know."

The US Embassy in Paris gave de Kolb an interim passport and US Visa, and he sailed to the USA to design dresses for a New York department store. In this he was unsuccessful. "In France, a designer is something completely different from the designers here. In France, a designer does nothing but sketch and drape. I am not a pattern maker. In this country cutters are used to taking clothes apart and cutting directly from the pieces. I could find no cutters to make patterns from my design. There was just no such animals around, so I said to the head of the department store, "Look Sir, it makes no sense for me to stay and take the money from your pocket. And so I left."

Later, de Kolb founded a firm of industrial designers (Eric de Kolb Designers, 20 East 53rd Street, New York, NY) that packaged cosmetics for Helena Rubinstein, Coty, Schiaparelli, and other great names in the loveliness industry. He won a package-designing Oscar three times for his work, which he said, "...should be beautiful, appetizing and make customers buy the product, but never fool people." He also created package designs for the Fuller Brush Company.

Eric de Kolb is the original creator and designer of many fashions and commercial packaging. Some of these designs are: footie pajamas with booties and snap opening for diaper change; four-dimensional perfume bottle (perfume in a glass nude figurine); four-dimensional unbreakable dispenser/bottle (milk or honey in a Teddy Bear figurine); rubber coated unbreakable spray bottle for the shower.

De Kolb was a sculptor and a collector of ancient art. The Metropolitan Museum of Art offered a tour of his home to see his collection on February 20, 1970. Eric had a showing of jewelry pieces ranging in value from $20,000 to $40,000 (Aztec Jewelry). The jewelry was unwearable because of the softness of 24kt gold. De Kolb was asked to sculpt replicas of his ancient jewelry and statue collection. He used the "cie perdue" or lost wax process, in which a tiny wax sculpture is converted to a clay form mold. The mold is heated until the wax flows out, and then filled with 14kt gold. The mold is broken to release the piece, with the result that each cast piece is one of a kind.

When de Kolb was approached by Bonwit Teller to sell his gold ancient art replica jewelry pieces, he imported Italian craftsmen. De Kolb modeled each piece like a sculptor. Prices for the pieces ranged from $50 to $390.

On behalf of the Eric de Kolb Collection, major department stores presented full page ads in major newspapers throughout the United States and Italy. Eric de Kolb made many personal appearances. Women's Wear Daily said: "Eric de Kolb designer jewelry collection with Persian, Pre-Columbian, Greek and Etruscan influences based on his own extensive collection of Romanesa, Madonnas, early Greek and Etruscan bronzes, and African sculptures. 14kt gold with 24kt overlay for ancient gold effect".

Eric de Kolb is also noted for his design of night clubs and Riviera villas.

In New York City, Eric de Kolb owned the Gallery d' Hautbarr. Throughout the 1960s and 1970s, the famous Bodley Gallery in New York City became a major showcase for Eric de Kolb's work. De Kolb was hailed by critics as a modern Cellini for his one-man show of miniature sculptures at the Kleeman Gallery.

De Kolb married his first wife Louise Christine in 1940. In 1983 he married Elvira Esterhazy (Elvira Alexandra Maria Lucia Isabella Rudolphine (b.Vienna 13 Apr 1929); m. New York 1 Dec 1983 Eric de Kolb-Wartenberg).

Eric de Kolb was commissioned by Pope John Paul II to paint "The Miracles of St. Anthony" when he went to Padua and Brazil.

He gave gifts to the Snite Museum of Art. His paintings were also on display there.

== Books ==
Eric de Kolb's books include: African Sooth Sayers and Ashanti Gold Weights and a book written with Katherine Oak Quinn on African art.

== Awards and Mentions ==
- The Marquis Who's Who Publications Bureau.
- Biographical records in "Who's Who in the East 17th Edition" for individuals "who have demonstrated outstanding abilities in their field."
- Two-time winner of the Welsh Award for Commercial Design.
- World's Who's Who in Commerce & Industry - 13th Edition 1964-65 - Page 311.
- Who's Who in American Art 1966 - Page 107.
- Who's Who in American Art 1973 - Page 177-178.

== Death ==
Eric de Kolb died in 2001, of complications during a simple cataract surgery.

== Sources ==
- Full Page deKolb Designer Jewelry Ads and Newspaper Articles
- NY Times, Sunday 2/15/1970 – Bonwitt Teller – Gold Jewelry
- Women's Wear Daily Tuesday 2/17/1970 - Bonwitt Teller – Gold Jewelry
- Detroit Free Press – 6/14/1976 – Hudson's Dept. Store
- Newspaper – No Name or Date – Coplans
- Manhattan East Newspaper – Tuesday 5/26/1970
- The Atlanta Constitution – 11/28/1970
- NY Times – No Date – Bonwitt Tellers
- Women's Wear Daily – 1970
- Philadelphia Inquirer – 3/8/1970 – Bonwitt Tellers
- St. Louis Globe – Democrat – 11/3/1970 Stix, Baer, & Fuller
- St. Louis Post Dispatch 1970
- NY Times -10/24/1970 – Tiffany & Co.
- Dayton Daily News – Sunday 11/29/1970 – Rike's Dept. Store
- Atlantic Journal – Wednesday 12/2/1970 – Rich's Dept. Store
- Rochester Democrat & Chronicle – Sunday 12/6/1970 – Rike's Dept. Store
- Spettacolli – Giornale D' Italia – 1970
- Martedi – 12/2/1970
- Newspaper Roma
- NY Times – Thursday 3/4/1971 – Bloomingdales
- Detroit Free Press – 3/21/71 – Hudson Dept. Store
- Columbus Dispatch – Sunday 5/16/1971 – Lazarus
- Columbus Dispatch -5/14/71
- Los Angeles Times – Tuesday 10/19/71 – Bullocks Wilshire
- Houston Post – Wednesday 11/16/1971
- Atlanta Journal – Wednesday 11/24/71
- New York Post – 1971 – Gallery D' Hautebarr – Amulets and Talisman.
- Palm Beach Post Times – Sunday 2/20/72 – Jordan Marsh
- Miami Herald – 2/20/72 – Jordan Marsh
- Fort Lauderdale News and Sun Sentinel 2/20/72 – Jordan Marsh
- Fort Lauderdale News and Sun Sentinel 3/6/72 – Jordan Marsh
- Houston Post – 4/6/72 – Talisman Collection – Foley's
- Houston Chronicle – 4/4/72
- Houston Post – 4/4/72
- Detroit Free Press 1972
- Atlanta Constitution – 5/11/72 – Rich's
- Worth Side News – 5/11/72
- St. Antonio's Express 9/17/72
- Miami Herald – 11/28/72
- Atlantis Constitution – 12/1/72
