= Bela Borsodi =

Austrian photographer (born 1966)

Bela Borsodi (born 1966) is an Austrian still life photographer based in New York City.

== Biography ==
Bela Borsodi was born in Vienna in 1966 and has lived and worked in New York City since the early 1990s. He studied fine art and graphic design with a great interest in psychology but often incorporated photography in his projects. When his friends started working at magazines and asked him to take photographs for them, Borsodi became more interested in photography. This led to an early career as a photographer where he shot portraits, reportage, and some fashion for editorials in Austria and Germany.

== Style ==
Through combining aspects of fine art, graphic design, craft, and psychology, his work offers a surreal imagery that makes clothing and accessories 3-dimensional.

Borsodi says of his work “I love making things and putting things in an unusual context incorporating various visual languages coming from art and graphic design–eroticism is also a fascination of me that I love exploring".

== Commercial work ==
Bela Borsodi’s work has appeared in publications such as V Magazine, Vogue, Wallpaper Magazine, and Another Magazine. He has worked with fashion brands such as Uniqlo, Baume et Mercier Watches, Hermès, and Selfridges.

== Controversy ==
His “Foot Fetish” story for V Magazine received much publicity, both negative and positive. He was attacked by feminist groups while his photos sparked new discussions on how the female body is sexualized and objectified in fashion and in art.

== Collections ==
Two of his collaborative works with Stefan Sagmeister are included in the Cooper-Hewitt Design Museum at the Smithsonian.
