= Journal of Austrian-American History =

- Discipline: Cultural studies, history, political science
- Language: English
- Edited by: Michael Burri

Publication details
- History: 2017–present
- Publisher: Penn State University Press (United States)
- Frequency: Biannual
- Open access: Open Access
- License: CC-BY-NC-ND
- Impact factor: 0.116 (2025)

Standard abbreviations
- ISO 4: J. Austrian-Am. Hist.

Indexing
- ISSN: 2475-0905 (print); 2475-0913 (web)
- LCCN: 2016209652
- OCLC no.: 964078930

Links
- Journal homepage

The Journal of Austrian-American History is a biannual, open access, peer-reviewed scholarly journal published by Pennsylvania State University Press, and the flagship publication of the Botstiber Institute for Austrian-American Studies.

The journal publishes new research, review essays, and other materials of significance that explore the historic relationship between the United States and Austria, including the lands of the historic Habsburg empire. A current index of published articles is available.

Content is interdisciplinary and emphasizes transatlantic exchange, across the fields of historical, political science, economics, law, and cultural studies.

The Journal is covered in the Scopus abstract and citation database, in the MLA Bibliography, and it is included in ERIH PLUS and Open Alex indexes, as well as in the Directory of Open Access Journals. Its Q3 2025 Scopus impact factor is 0.116, with a rising three-year average. The journal is indexed and accessible via the digital library of the Scholarly Publishing Collective at Duke University Press.

== Austrian-American relations ==
By the mid-eighteenth century and the period of the American revolution, the Austrian-American relationship had already become significant. Transatlantic trade had begun between the Austrian-controlled port of Trieste and Philadelphia, while by the 1780s, the imperial court established the first Austrian representative in the Americas, Baron de Beelen-Bertholff, as a trade envoy.

In 1820, appointed by Emperor Francis II, Alois von Lederer became the first Austrian Consul General to the United States. By 1829, with the blessing of Klemens von Metternich, Austrian religious and entrepreneurial elites had established the Leopoldine Society, a missionary endeavor founded to support Catholics in the United States, though in its early years, the Society devoted some of its greatest attention to Anishinaabe groups and Indigenous Peoples of the Upper Midwest.

Beyond the Leopoldine Society, the Habsburg encounter with Native America remains an object of contemporary scholarly engagement in a number of publications, with focal points including Native American plumes in Vienna festival culture of the before 1700, the visualization of the Native American and the Roma in Austrian interwar art and popular culture, and cultural artifacts acquired from Indigenous peoples now held as part of the North American collection at the Weltmuseum, the principal ethnographic museum in Vienna.

During the American Civil War, Habsburg elites, such as Charles Frederick de Loosey, the Austrian consul in New York, finessed a balance among U.S., Austrian, and Mexican interests. Meanwhile, immigrants from across Austria-Hungary, who carried with them their own multilayered ethnic, national, religious and other identities, had begun to shape everyday life in the fields of media and commerce, popular and high culture, and more.

The First World War reconfigured Austrian-American relations, not least through the postwar redrawing of Austro-Hungarian borders and the financial reconstruction of the First Austrian Republic. But inasmuch as the U.S. Senate had rejected the Treaty of Versailles, the process of reaching a U.S.-Austrian peace took a circuitous and prolonged path. These latter developments represent only a few of the highlights in a twentieth-century characterized by a series of bilateral milestones in political, economic, and diplomatic relations between the two countries.

A central feature of the Austrian-American relationship is the movement of people between the two countries. Immigrants and refugees from Austria and the historic Habsburg region have contributed significantly in American achievements in the arts, culture, and sciences, even as these trailblazers have been described as "silent invaders." Indeed, there is scarcely any period in North American history, where these "silent invaders" have not made their presence felt across broad swathes of North American life, with their impact on design and pedagogy representing additional fields where scholarly research has just begun.

The consequences of economic hardship in the 1920s, together with political instability, and most notably, the lethal persecution of Jews in the wake of the 1938 Anschluss with Nazi Germany forced those Austrians who could to leave the country. Frederike Maria Beer-Monti, the only person painted by both Gustav Klimt and Egon Schiele in full-length portraits, managed the Artists' Gallery in New York. Graphic designer, artist, and author, Lisl Weil developed a style of drawing that adapted Viennese traditions for high-end American fashion publications, and she collaborated with the Little Orchestra Society, making live drawings with charcoal on a large white canvas while the orchestra performed The Socerer's Apprentice. Meanwhile, Austrian political elites, languishing in a New York exile, plotted their triumphant return to a postwar and post-National Socialist Austria.

Nevertheless, with few exceptions, as when the U.S. Justice Department prevented Austrian president Kurt Waldheim from entering the United States, American public opinion has only occasionally registered the Austrian National Socialist past. Following the Second World War, images, tropes—and not least, revenue—generated by the tourism industry did much to promote symbols of natural beauty, Alpine purity, and culture, and delivered a comforting, if forgetful, new gloss to the Austrian nation brand. For its part, the entertainment industry largely continues to reshuffle episodes in Austrian-American history, via familiar tropes of imperial Austria, the Cold War, "Coca-Colonization", and more.

== Published volumes ==
The Journal of Austrian-American History publishes articles representing the full diversity of scholarship on the Austrian-American relationship. The first volume, which appeared in 2017, included articles on Hungarian migrant marriages in the United States, a study of Austrian and Dustbowl refugees, as they appear in Hollywood cinema, and an assessment of Hip hop, Malcolm X, and Muslim activism in Austria. The volume that followed featured a special issue on migration from Central Europe, together with articles on the ties between the industrialist and arts patron Walter Paepcke, the Hungarian artist László Moholy-Nagy, and an emerging Bauhaus sensibility in Chicago, among others.

The Journal has also presented archival research foregrounding the correspondence of prominent Habsburg-Americans, with articles devoted to John R. Palandech, the well-known immigrant publisher, politician, and entrepreneur in Chicago, as well as an essay by Walter D. Kamphoefner on language and loyalty among German Americans during World War I. Oral histories of American diplomatic personnel stationed in Vienna from 1945–55, recorded by the Association for Diplomatic Studies and Training, have also been published.

Transatlantic cultural relations remain a continuing focus of Journal contributions. The 2020 volume included an investigation of Vienna and the British-American film production, The Third Man, as a locus classicus for postwar espionage, while the 2021 volume presented five essays devoted to "Americans in Vienna 1945-1955." The 2022 special issue highlighted "Musical Diplomacy in Austrian-American Relations."

The 2022 journal special issue also featured a review by Günter Bischof of Allied post-World War II occupation and nation-building, and its lessons for the future. That same volume included a special issue on "Austrian Children and Youth Fleeing Nazi Austria," with four contributions, ranging from an essay on Ernst Papanek to an article on intracategorical complexity in the memoirs of young Jewish Austrian emigrants to the United States.

Following the 2023 collection of essays devoted to the Hungarian-American scholar István Deák, the 2024 issue of the Journal presented new research on the United States and the development tourism in Austria, together with collection of articles on Central European Religious Initiatives in 19th Century America." In 2025, the Journal published a special issue on "Austrian Women Artists and Transatlantic Exchange in Design and Pedagogy," together with research on László Frank, the postwar Hungarian prophet of anti-Americanism who spent the war years in Shanghai exile. The 2026 issue featured, several contributions devoted to the Japanese-American photographer Yoichi Okamoto, whose influence remain lodged in the images he captured of the newly-reborn Austrian Republic after 1945.

== Editorial board ==
The editorial board of the Journal of Austrian-American History is composed of Austrian history scholars in Israel, the United States, and in Europe, including Siegfried Beer, Peter Becker, Günter Bischof, Gary B. Cohen, Olivia Florek, Farid Hafez, Christian Karner, Nathan Marcus, Anita McChesney, Britta McEwen, Martin Nedbal, Nicole M. Phelps, Dominique Reill, Julia Secklehner, Robert Schuett, Janis Staggs, and Jonathan Singerton. Journal editor is Michael Burri.

== See also ==
- Austrian Americans
- Austrian Studies Association
- Foreign relations of the United States
- Foreign relations of Austria
- Transatlantic relations
