= Vienna Shorts =

Annual film festival held in Vienna, Austria

- Location: Vienna, Austria
- Website: www.viennashorts.com

Vienna Shorts (formerly known as VIS Vienna Independent Shorts) is an international short film festival held annually in May in Vienna. It is the largest short film festival in Austria.

== History ==
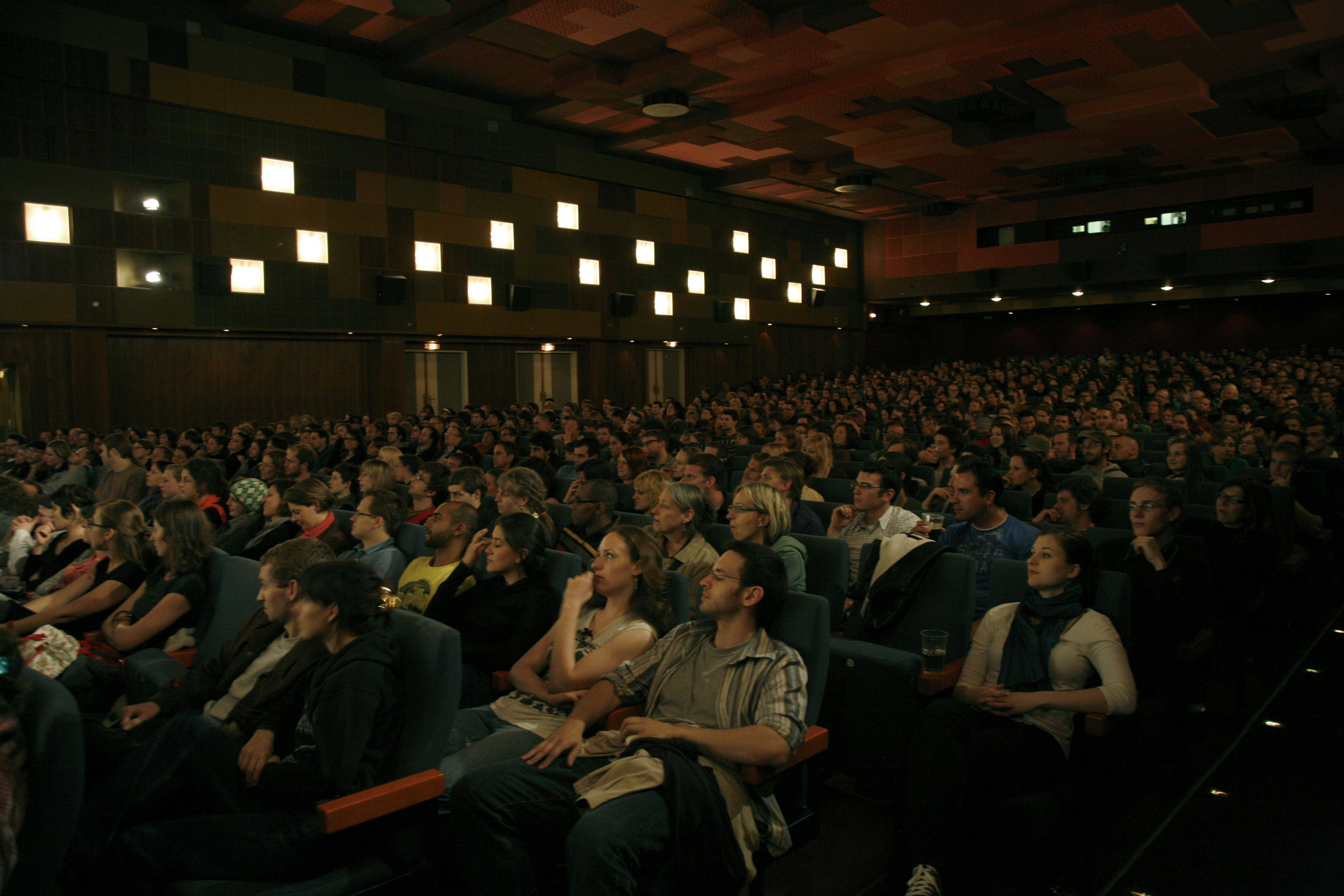
Festival opening 2009 at the Gartenbaukino

Vienna Independent Shorts was held in 2004 for the first time. Several Viennese institutions active in the promotion of short films arranged one day of the one-week event. The festival program consisted of 125 short films. Among the venues that have been used continuously since the first festival edition are the Top Kino and the Reformed Church.

Since 2005, the festival is hosted the Independent Cinema Association which was founded by the organizers of the first festival edition. For the first time an international competition with 64 films was held. Annually recurring festival events, which were introduced in 2005, are a retrospective of the University of Applied Arts Vienna and a Kino Kabaret.

The festival edition of 2006 included 83 films in international competition. A retrospective was dedicated to Austrian director Mara Mattuschka and short films from Southeast Europe were given a special focus. The film reel of the 26 single films of The Mozart-Minute, which was produced on the occasion of the 250th birthday of Mozart, celebrated its Vienna premiere at the festival. In 2006, venues outside of Vienna – in Dornbirn, Graz and Innsbruck – were also used for festival screenings.

In 2007, a Panorama section with Austrian short films was added to the international competition for the first time. 49 short films were part of the international competition, 23 films were presented in the Panorama section. There were also three retrospectives with short films by Paul Bush, Miranda July and Virgil Widrich. One of several guest programs was curated by the Ars Electronica. In the context of VIS on Tour Vienna Independent Shorts compiled film programs for the Vienna Festival, the Forum Stadtpark, Crossing Europe, the Diagonale, and others. Since 2007, the permanent festival office is located at the quartier21 of the Museumsquartier.

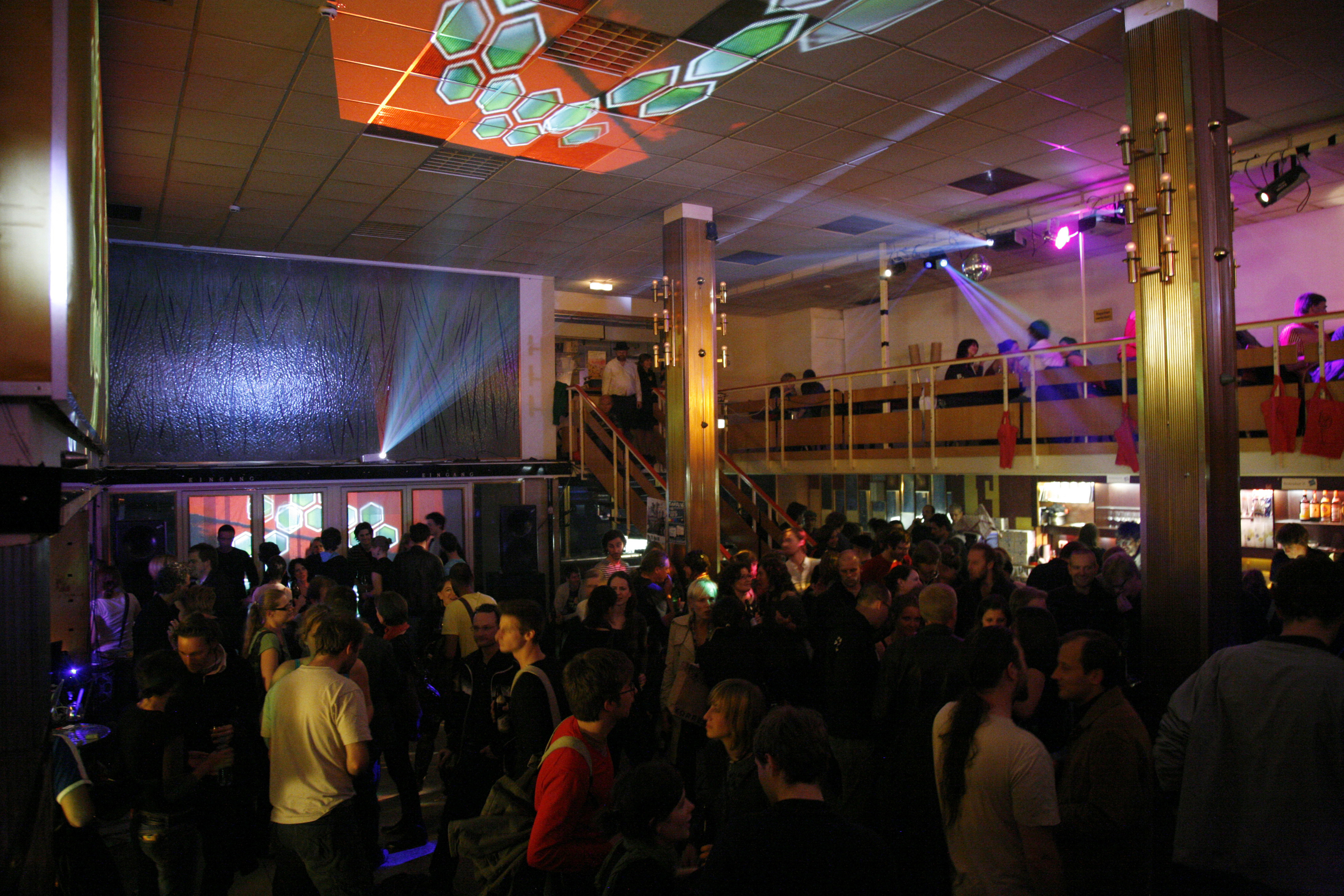
Opening party 2009

Vienna Independent Shorts 2008 was opened with the world premiere of Eleven Minutes at Vienna's Gartenbaukino with about 1100 guests attending. The Austrian-Swiss anthology film was produced on the occasion of the UEFA Euro 2008 taking place in both countries. Switzerland was given a special focus, including a film program by the Baden Fantoche Animation Film Festival. Forza Bastia, a rarely shown documentary film by Jacques Tati, was screened in the context of an emphasis on films dealing with association football. Retrospectives devoted to Chantal Akerman, Hubert Sielecki and Jerzy Kucia were also presented at the festival. In addition to twenty special and guest programs there were 47 films in international competition and 33 films in the Panorama section.

311 short films were presented during the sixth edition of Vienna Independent Shorts in 2009, including 44 films in international competition. 1129 films from 54 countries were submitted. Major thematic focuses were the memory of the years 1939 (the outbreak of World War II) and 1989 (the fall of the Berlin Wall) as well as the United States and Russia. Retrospectives were devoted to, inter alia, Ben Rivers, Norbert Pfaffenbichler and Lotte Schreiber, and the California Institute of the Arts.

The 2010 VIS Festival was held at seven screening locations in Vienna and two new competitions in the category of international narrative and documentary short film were added: Animation Avantgarde and a national competition that awarded the country's first Austrian Short Film Award. Over 1800 international films were submitted for the festival which had "Dance and Rhythm" as its general thematic focus. The music-based events were presented in cooperation with Radio FM4 and the sixpackfilm distribution firm. Max Hattler and Noriko Okaku premiered their VIS-commissioned audiovisual performance "Resc(O)re 192010". Filmmaker Adnan Popović created the year's popular trailer. Retrospectives on the works Miranda Pennell and Thomas Draschan were presented and the independent Vienna broadcast channel Octo as well as the Austrian national network ORF offered lengthy television coverage on the festival.

Max Hattler created the festival trailer for VIS 2011.

== Award winners ==
Awards winner 2005
Golden Shorts – Audience Award	Stefan Wolner (Austria): Balls
Award winners 2006
Golden Shorts – Audience Award	Alexis Ferrebeuf (France): Mort à l'écran
DocuZone Austria Short Film Award	Markus Oberndorfer (Austria): Untitled_in_Case_No_1
diemelange Short Film Award	Björn Kämmerer (Austria): Escalator
Award winners 2007
Vienna Short Film Award	Marc Schaus (Belgium): Quelque chose en O
ray Audience Award	Astrid Rieger (Germany): Apple On a Tree / Mammal
3 Short Film Awards	Johanna Moder (Austria): Her mit dem schönen Leben SI.SI. Klocker (Austria): Laura. Was Sie schon immer über Telefonsex wissen wollten Iris Blauensteiner (Austria): Suture
Award winners 2008
Vienna Short Film Award	Alina Rudnitskaya (Russia): Kak stat stervoi (Vixen Academy)
ray Audience Award	Radu Jude (Romania): Lampa cu caciula (The Tube With a Hat)
Hoanzl Audience Awards	Umut Dag (Austria): Todesnachrichten Katharina Swoboda (Austria): Transition; Sasha Pirker (Austria): John Lautner, The Desert Hot Springs Motel; Bernhard Hetzenauer (Austria): Wann habe ich aufgehört, dir meine Träume zu erzählen?
Hubert Sielecki Prize	Michael Wirthig (Austria): Inside 1014
Award winners 2009
Vienna Short Film Award	Asitha Ameresekere (UK): 14
ray Audience Award	Sasha Pirker (Austria): Angelica Fuentes, The Schindler House
Hoanzl Audience Award	Elizabeth Marre, Olivier Pont (France): Manon sur le bitume
Airbed Movie Award	Robert Pohle, Martin Hentze (Germany): Der Conny ihr Pony
Prix Très Chic	Carsten Strauch (Germany): Das grüne Schaf
Hubert Sielecki Prize	Adnan Popović (Austria): Walzerkönig
Award winners 2010
Vienna Short Film Award	Liza Johnson (USA): In the Air
ASIFA Austria Award	Joaquín Cociña, Cristóbal León, Niles Atallah (Chile): Lucía Joaquín Cociña, Cristóbal León, Niles Atallah (Chile): Luis
ASIFA Austria Award Special Mention	Max Hattler (Germany/UK): AANAATT
Austrian Short Film Award	Lisa Weber (Austria): Kommt ein Sonnenstrahl in die Tiefkühlabteilung und weicht alles auf
LG Audience Award	Chris Niemeyer (Switzerland): Las Pelotas
Skip Audience Award	Joaquín Cociña, Cristóbal León, Niles Atallah (Chile): Lucía
ray Audience Award	Robert Cambrinus (Austria/UK): Commentary
Elfi von Dassanowsky Prize	Inger Lise Hansen (Norway): Parallax
Airbed Movie Award	Katharine Pfiel, Marlene Rudy, Andreea Jebeleean, Barbara Wilding, Volker Buchgraber, Dominik Hart (Austria): Der Conny ihr Pony
Prix Très Chic	Florian Juri (Austria): Zerebrale Dichotomie
Award winners 2011
Vienna Short Film Award	Nicolas Provost (Belgium): Stardust
ASIFA Austria Award	David O'Reilly (Germany): The External World
Austrian Short Film Award	Peter Tscherkassky (Austria): Coming Attractions
Citroën Audience Award	Rungano Nyoni (Zambia): Mwansa the Great
Skip Audience Award	David O'Reilly (Germany): The External World
ray Audience Award	Christoph Schwarz (Austria): Supercargo
Elfi von Dassanowsky Prize	Annick Blanc (Canada): Au milieu de nulle part ailleurs
VAM New Talent Prize	Christoph Schwarz (Austria): Supercargo
Airbed Movie Award	Susi Sie (Germany): Float
Prix Très Chic	Erik Eriksson and Rune Eriksson (Norway): Standup Comedy On Mars, Hand of God and Norwegian Shorts With No Ending: The 50 Years Anniversary of Annecy Int. Animation Festival Edition
Award winners 2012
Vienna Short Film Award	Jan Czarlewski (Poland/Switzerland): L'Ambassadeur & moi
ASIFA Austria Award	Ruth Lingford (UK/USA): Little Deaths
Austrian Short Film Award	Gabriele Mathes (Austria): Flaschenpost
Jameson Whiskey Audience Award	Samuel Tilman (Belgium): Nuit blanche
Skip Audience Award	Marta Pajek (Poland): Sleepincord
ray Audience Award	Dinko Draganovic (Austria): Tatin Ponos
Elfi von Dassanowsky Prize	Ruth Lingford (UK/USA): Little Deaths
VAM New Talent Prize	Katharina Gruzei (Austria): Die Arbeiterinnen verlassen die Fabrik
Special Prize of the Vienna Film Academy	Patrick Vollrath (Austria): Dieser Film ist ein Zusammenschnitt von DV-Kassetten, die bei einer Online-Auktion versteigert wurden
Jury Prize -Night of the Light	Eva Chytilek (Austria): Einbruch der Nacht
Audience Prize -Night of the Light	Willi Kubica (Austria): Ein Fest der Kabel und Stecker
Award Winners 2013
Vienna Short Film Award	Fyzal Boulifa (Morocco/UK): The Curse
ray-Audience Award Fiction Documentary	Robert Cambrinus (Austria): I can't cry much louder than this
ASIFA Austria Award	Don Hertzfeldt (USA): It's such a beautiful day
Artist-in-Residence Grant	Mihai Grecu and Thibault Geize (France): Exland
ray-Audience Award Animation Avantgarde	Joseph Pierce (UK): The Pub
Elfi-von-Dassanowsky-Prize	Karolina Glusiec (UK): Velocity
Austrian Short Film Award	Ulrike Putzer and Matthias van Baaren (Austria): Hands up to Heaven
Youth Jury Award	Ulrike Kofler (Austria): We're flying
VAM- New Talent Prize	Kurdwin Ayub (Austria): Family Holidays
ray-Audience Award Austrian Competition	Ulrike Kofler (Austria): We're flying
Austrian Music Video Award	Daniel Moshel (Austria): Metube: August sings Carmen 'Habanera' (Music: August Schram)
Audience Award International Music Video	Alma Har'el (Israel): Fjögur Píanó (Music: Sigur Rós)
Jury Prize Night of the Light	Reinhold Bidner and Georg Hobmeier (Austria): Impulse
Audience Award Night of the Light	Gabriel Tempea (Austria): Joghurt mit Wachs
Prix Très Chic	Marion Pfaus (Germany): Vodka Diary
Award Winners 2014
Vienna Short Film Award	Aniela Gabryel (Poland): Leciec, nie leciec (To fly or not to fly)
Audience Award Fiction Documentary	Guido Hendrikx (Netherlands): Escort
ASIFA Austria Award	Michel Klöfkorn (Germany): x-x-xx--x--gewobenes Papier
Artist-in-Residence Grant	Atsushi Wada (Japan): Anomalies
Audience Award Animation Avantgarde	Réka Bucsi (Hungary): Symphony No. 42
Elfi-von-Dassanowsky-Prize	Jennifer Reeder (USA): A Million Miles Away
Austrian Short Film Award	Christina Perschon (Austria): Noema
Youth Jury Award	Christina Perschon (Austria): Noema
VAM-New Talent Prize	Iris Blauensteiner (Austria): Sweat
ray-Audience Award Austrian Competition	Christina Perschon (Austria): Noema
Austrian Music Video Award	Anton B. Pevny (Austria): Maschin (Music: Bilderbuch)
Audience Award International Music Video	Carl Roosens and Noémie Marsily (Belgium): Our Lights (Music: BRNS)
Best Student Film	Peter Brunner (Austria): Milk Teeth
Jury Prize Night of the Light	Lena Weiss (Austria): Gatos de luz
Audience Award Night of the Light	Lena Weiss (Austria): Gatos de luz
Prix Très Chic	Adrian Thiessen (Canada): The Auteurs of Christmas
Jennifer Reeder Christiana Perschon Lena Weiss Antonin B. Pevny Iris Blauensteiner
Award Winners 2015
Vienna Short Film Award	Fabian Kaiser (Switzerland): De Schnuuf (The Breath)
Audience Award Fiction Documentary	Morgan Knibbe (Netherlands): Shipwreck
ASIFA Austria Award	Rainer Kohlberger (Austria): Moon Blink
Artist-in-Residence Grant	Peter Millard (UK): Fruit Fruit
Audience Award Animation Avantgarde	Don Hertzfeldt (USA): World of Tomorrow
Elfi-von-Dassanowsky-Prize	Konstantina Kotzamani (Greece): Washingtonia
Austrian Short Film Award	Sebastian Brameshuber (Austria): Of Stains, Scrap & Tires
Youth Jury Award	Christoph Rainer (Austria): Pitter Patter goes my Heart
VAM-New Talent Prize	Jola Wieczorek (Austria): List do Polski (Letter to Poland)
Audience Award Austrian Competition	Christoph Schwarz (Austria): Beingwhale
Austrian Music Video Award	Stephanie Winter (Austria): Tristes Déserts - A robots tale (Music: August feat. Austrian Apparel)
Audience Award International Music Video	Hiro Murai (Japan): Never Catch me (Music: Flying Lotus)
Jury Prize Night of the Light	Nicola von Leffern and Jakob Carl Sauer (Austria): Mafi Kharaba
Audience Award Night of the Light	Georg Blume and Anna Hawliczek (Austria): Iguana Imperialista
Prix Très Chic	Ernst Palicek (Austria): Summer in Vienna (prod.By 08)
Benjamin Gruber, Daniel Ebner Rainer Kohlberger Jola Wieczorek Fabian Kaiser Peter Millard Nicola von Leffern

== See also ==
- List of film festivals in Europe
