= List of Denison University people =

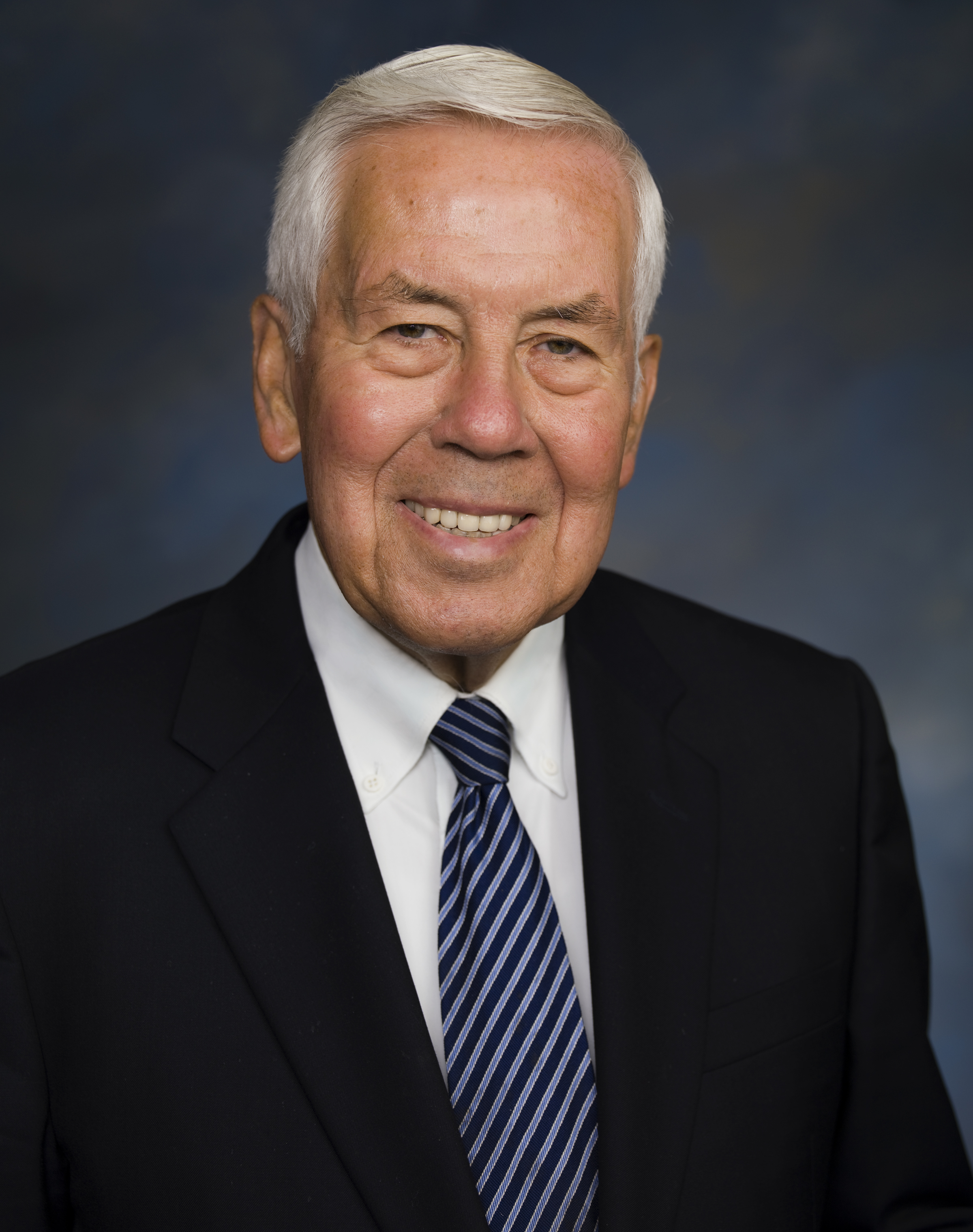
U.S. Senator Richard Lugar, class of 1954

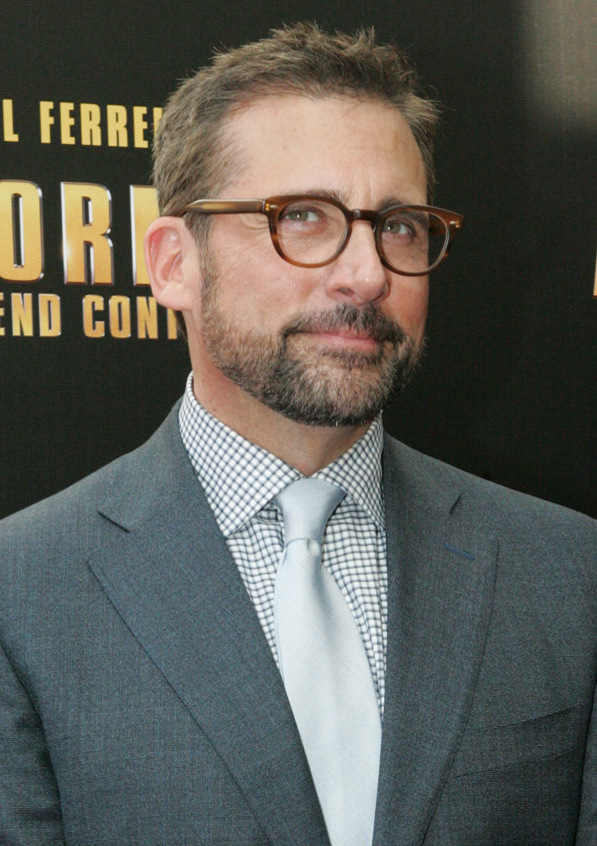
Actor Steve Carell, class of 1984

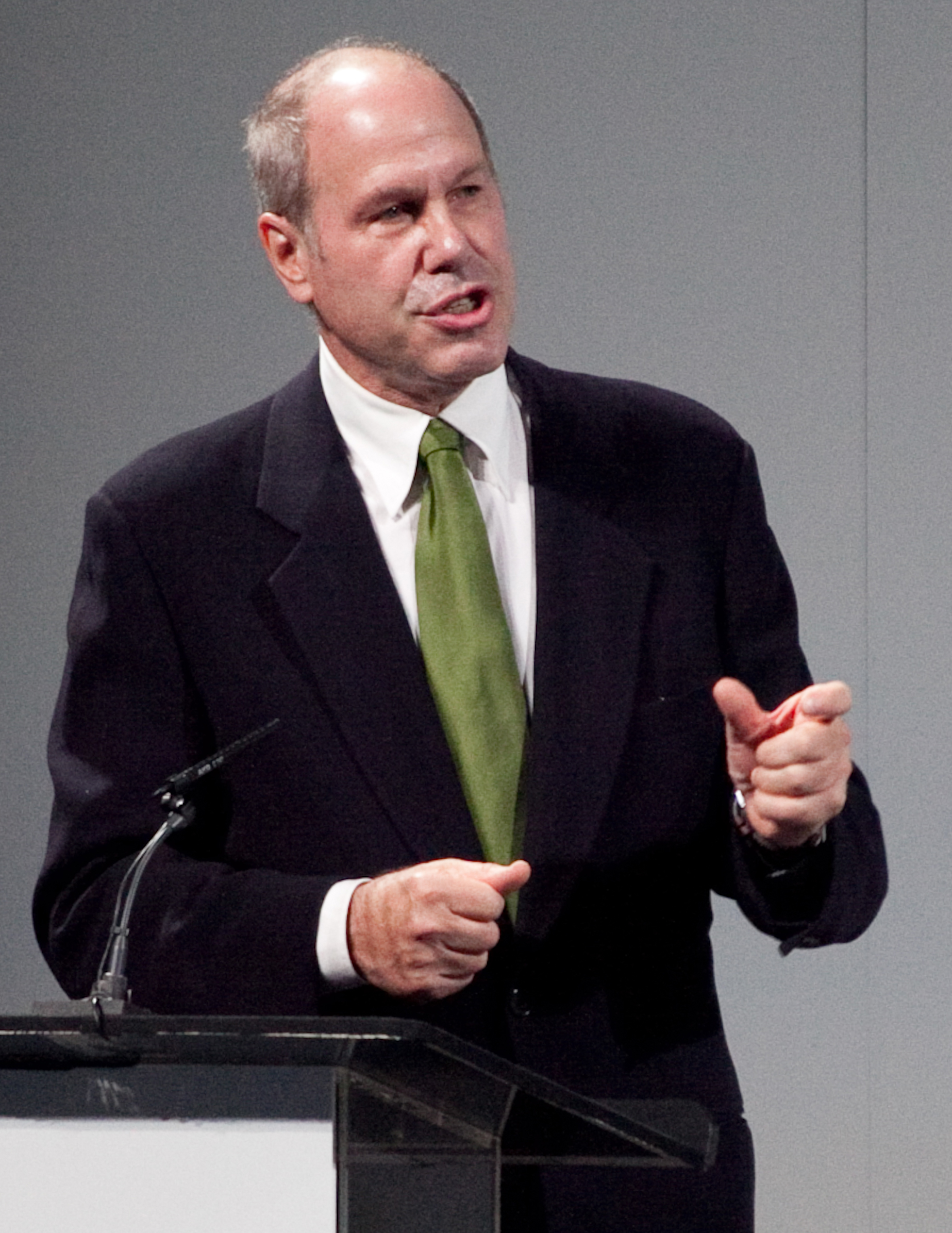
CEO of Disney Michael Eisner, class of 1964

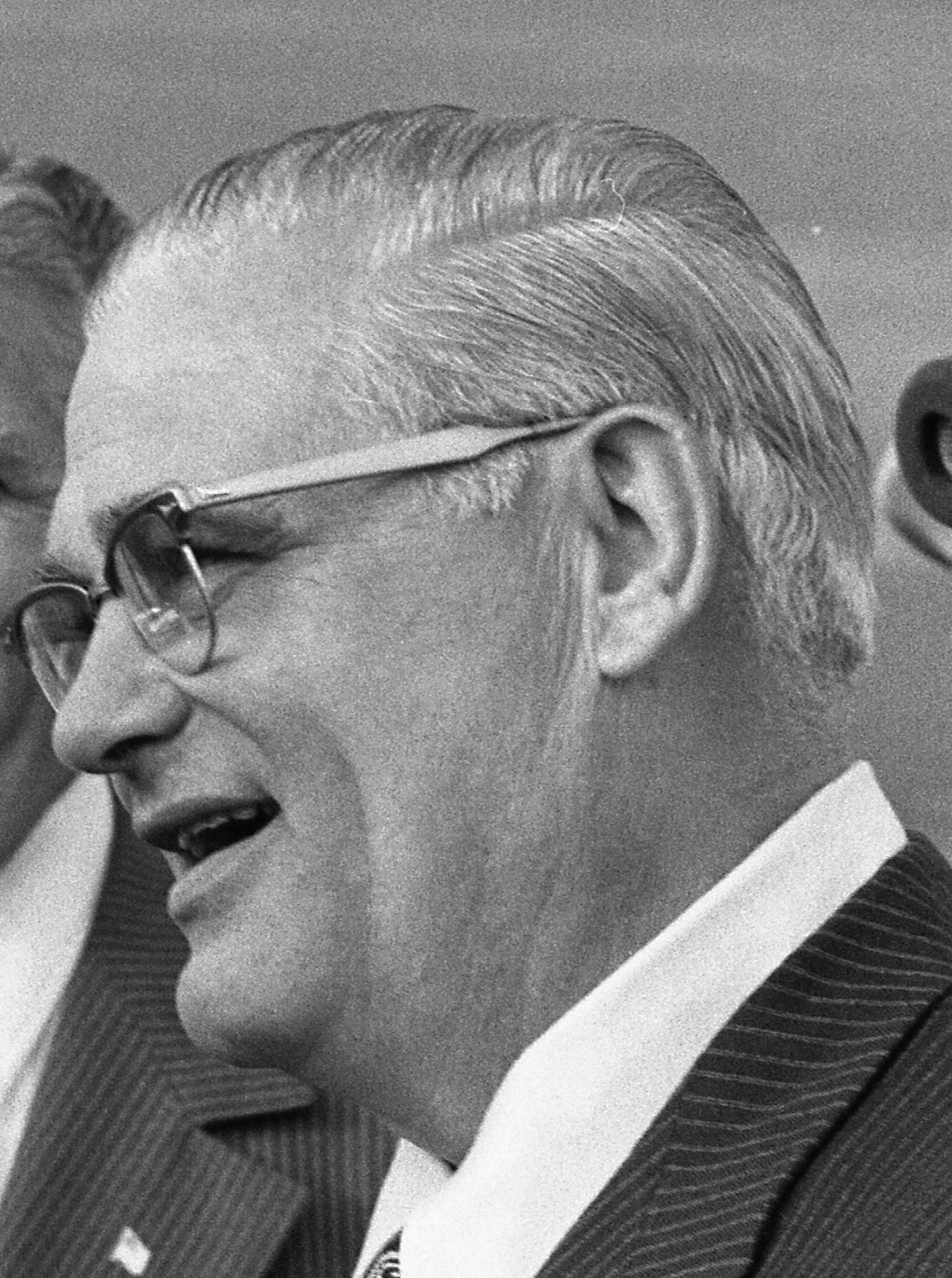
Hall of Fame football coach Woody Hayes, class of 1935

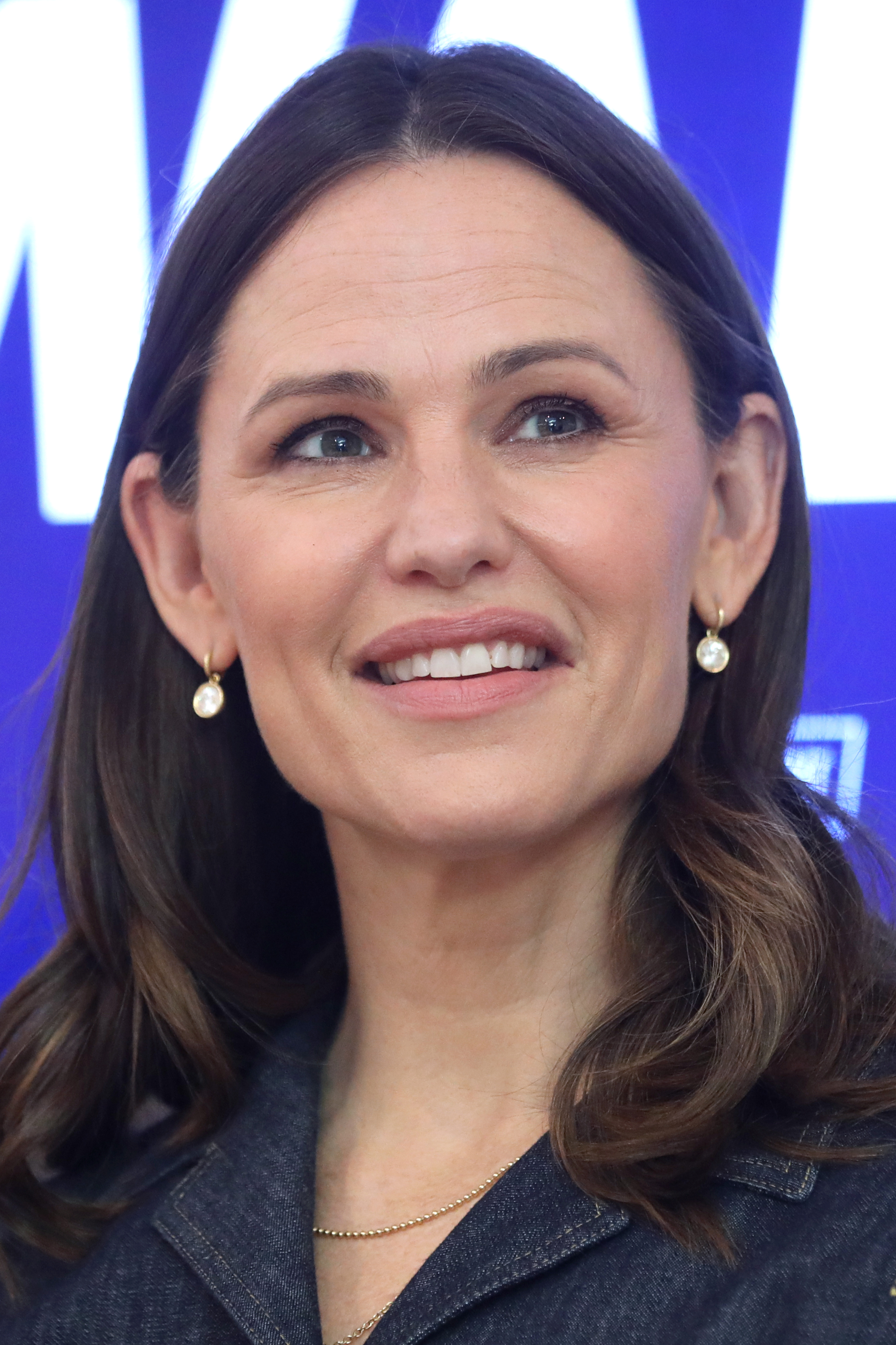
Actress Jennifer Garner, class of 1994

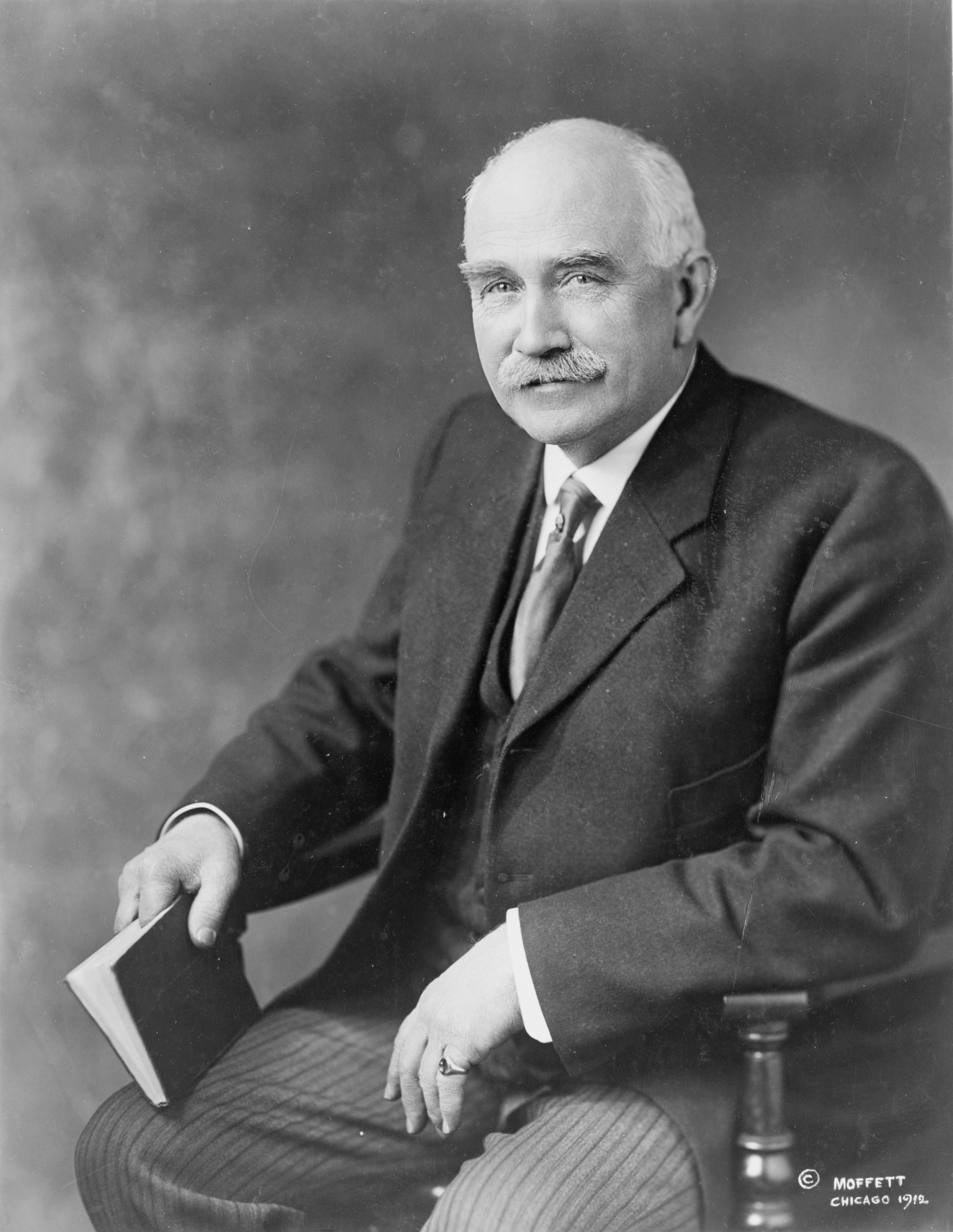
Judson Harmon, 45th governor of Ohio and 41st U.S. attorney general, class of 1866

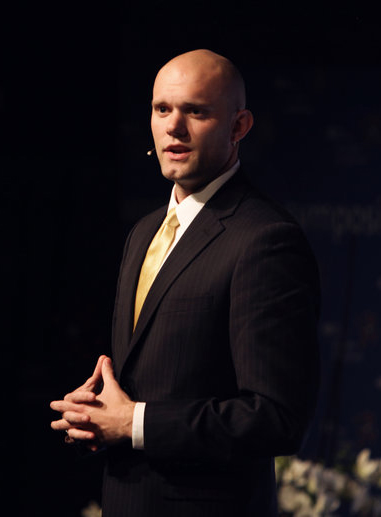
Best-selling author James Clear, class of 2008

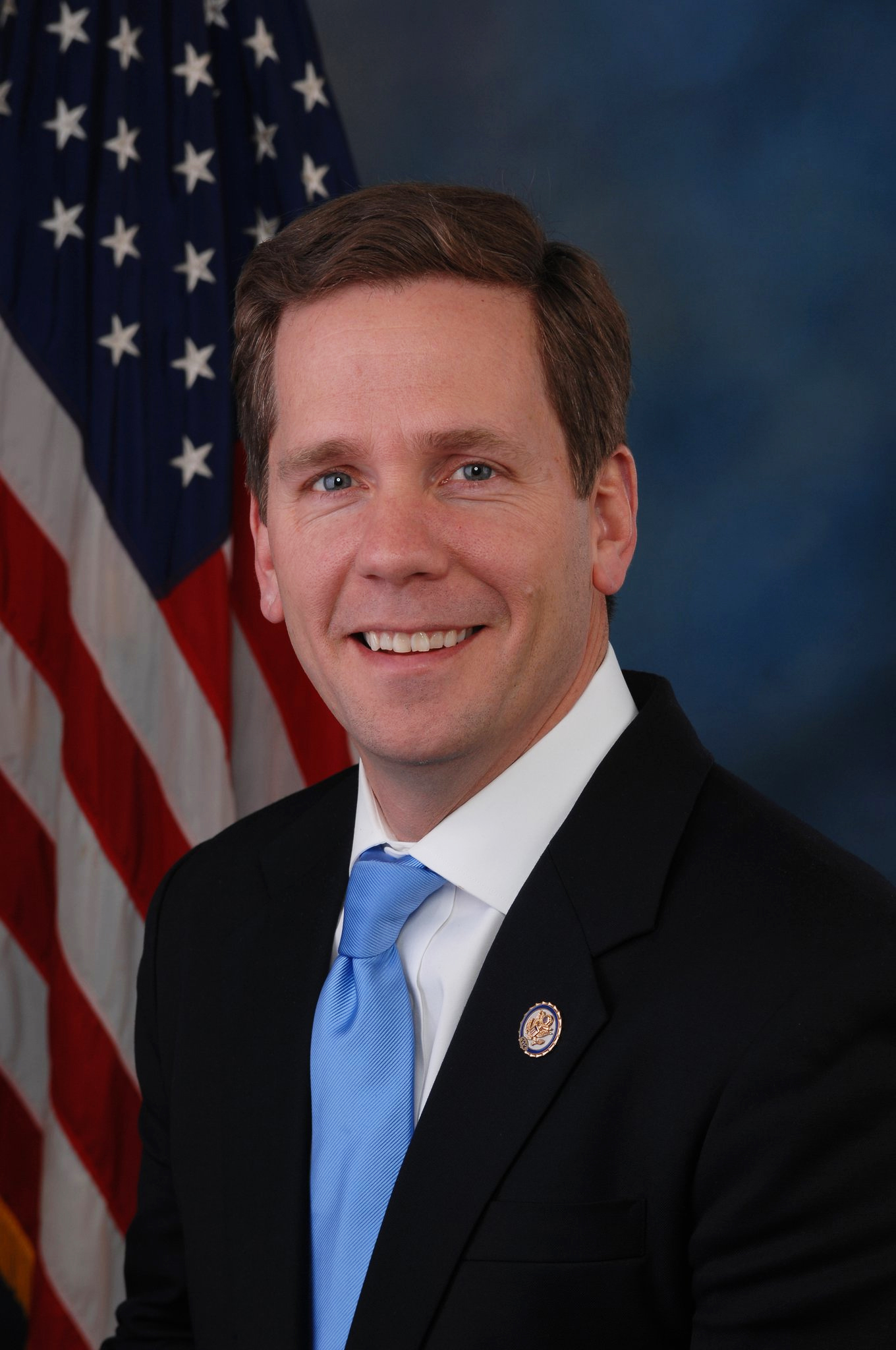
Congressman Bob Dold, class of 1991

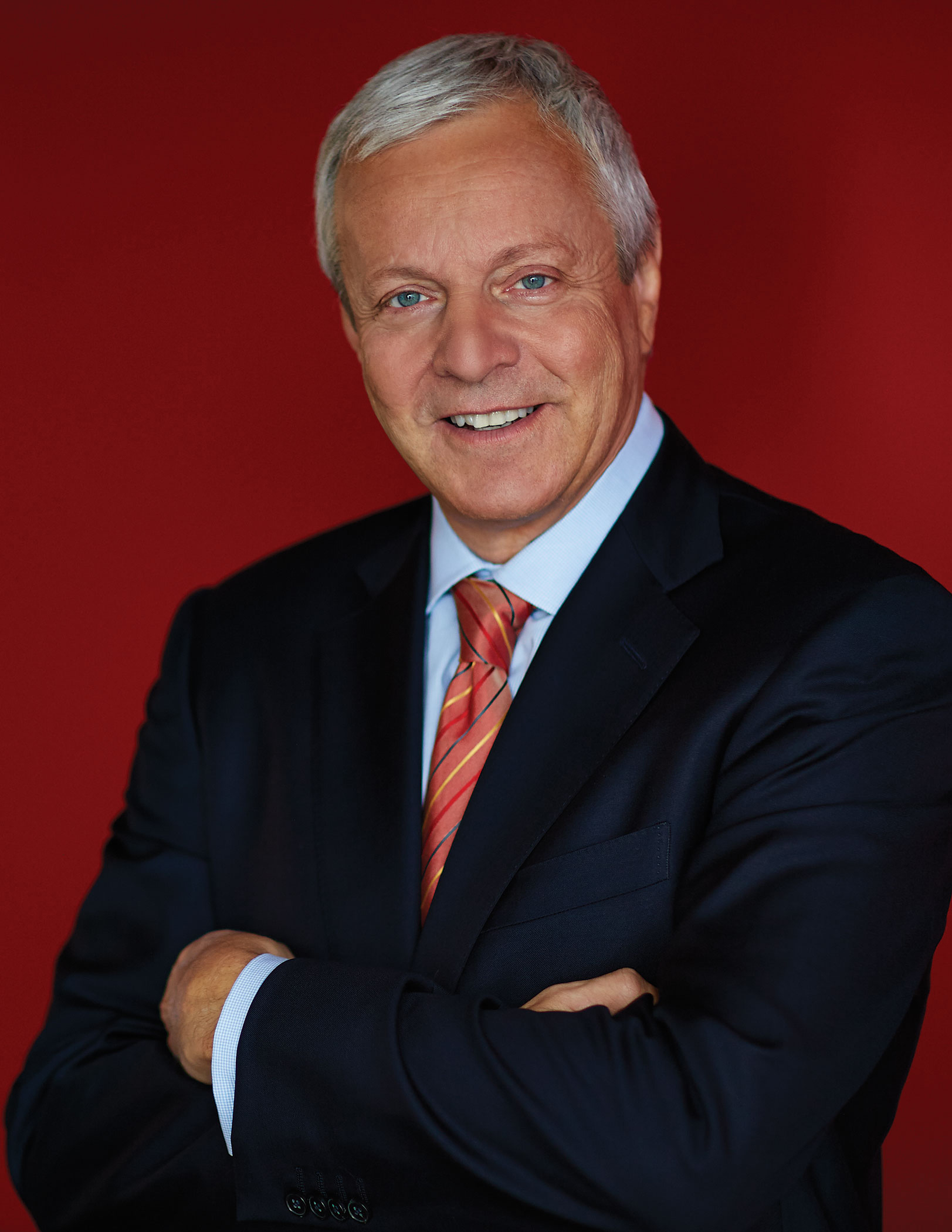
CEO of Burger King Brad Blum, class of 1976

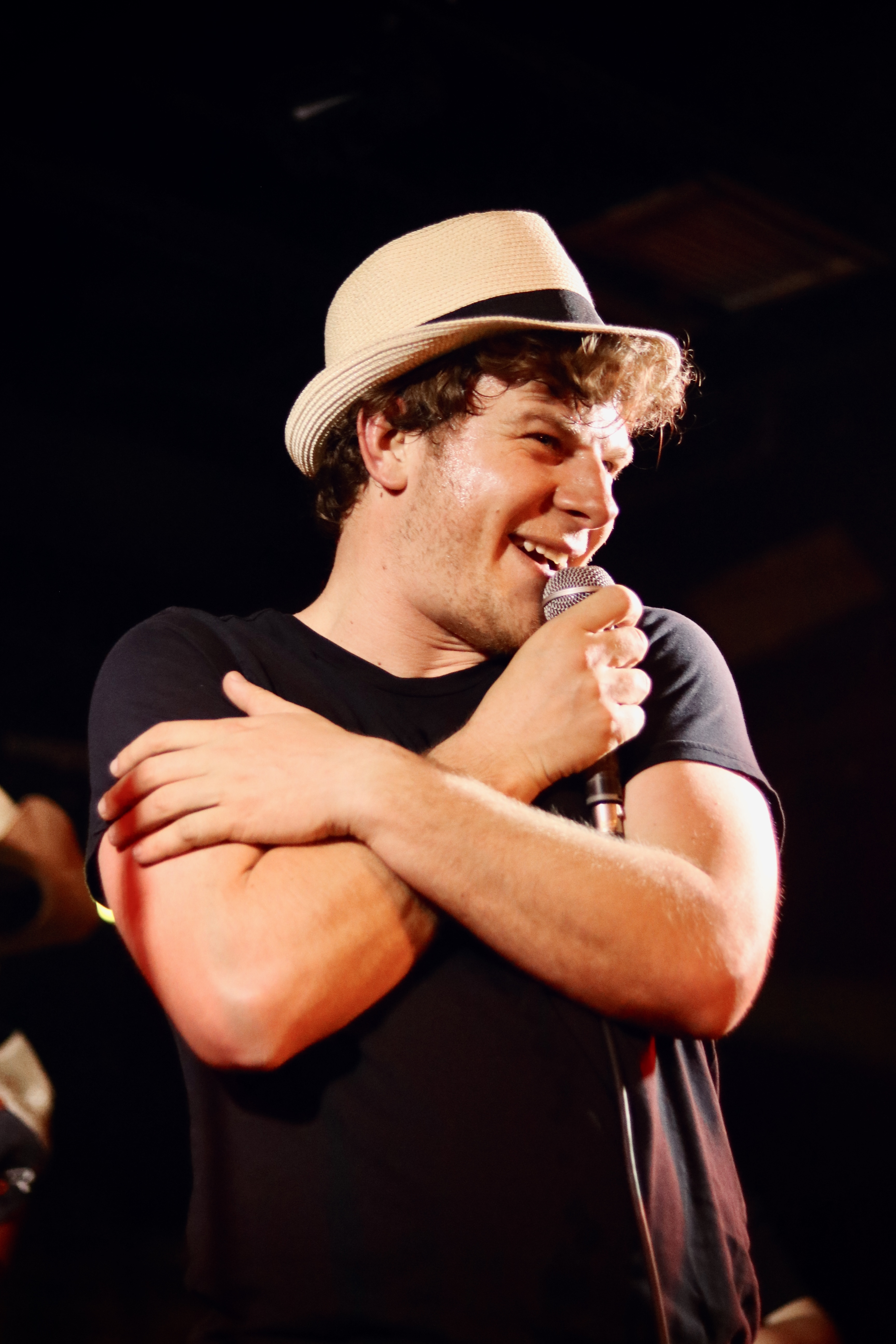
Comedian Kyle Gordon, class of 2014

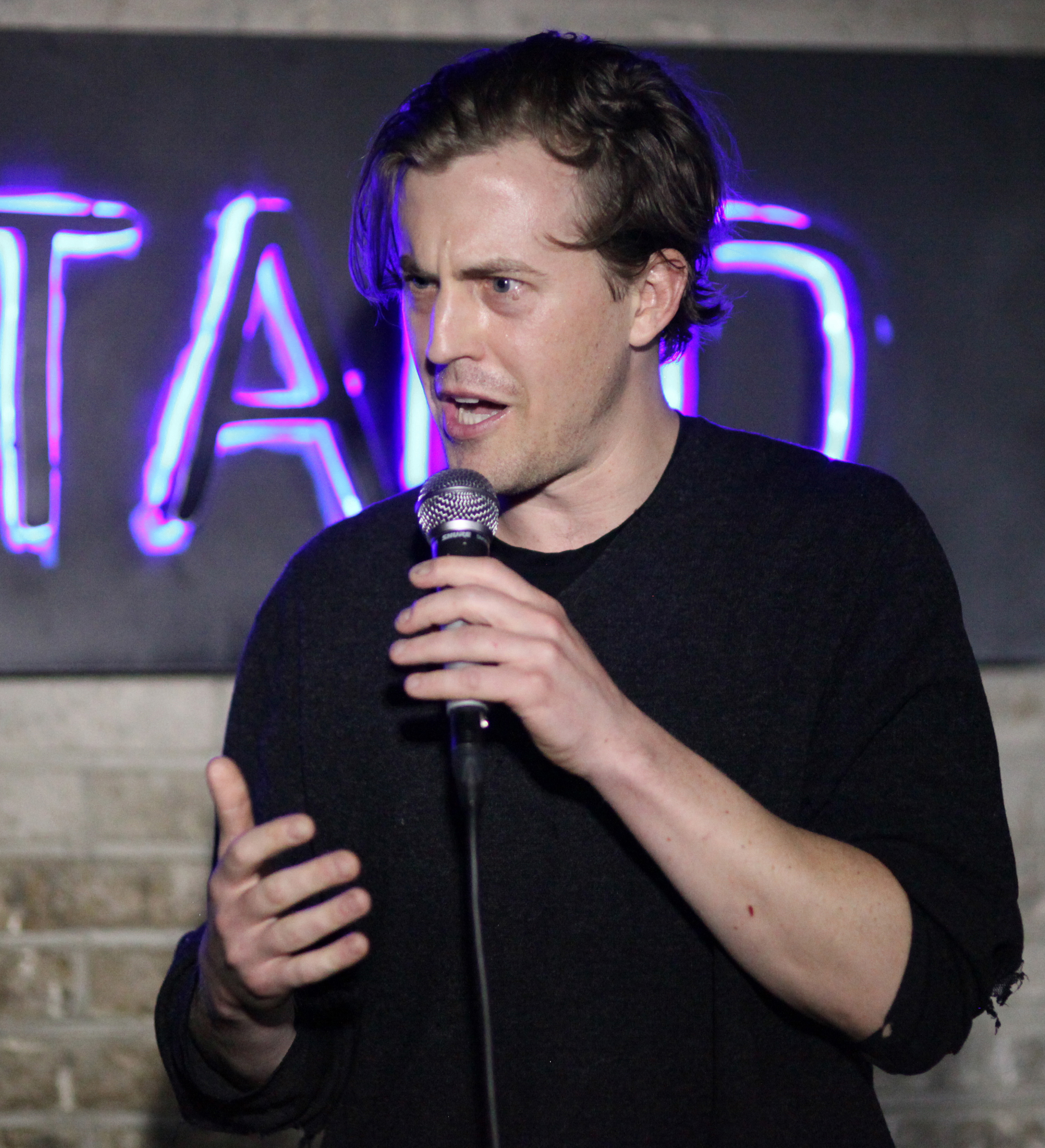
Actor Alex Moffat, class of 2004

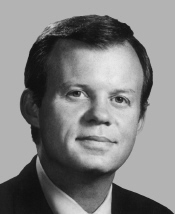
Ambassador and Congressman Tony P. Hall, class of 1964

Since Denison University in Granville, Ohio, was founded in 1831, there have been many individuals associated with Denison who are worthy of note including presidents of the university and alumni who have gone on to work in academia, business, arts and entertainment, government, literature, religion, science, and sports. In total, Denison has about 37,000 living alumni throughout the world.

Notable alumni include actors Steve Carell, Hal Holbrook, and Jennifer Garner; SNL comedian Alex Moffat; entertainer John Davidson; Hall of Fame college football coach Woody Hayes; ESPN president George Bodenheimer; Turner Broadcasting System Senior Vice President James Anderson; drag queen and LGBT activist Nina West, former member of Turkish Parliament and current consultant to The Coca-Cola Company Mehmet Cem Kozluformer; United States Senator Richard Lugar; Indy car racer Bobby Rahal; playwright Jeffrey Hatcher; artist Ned Bittinger; author Pam Houston, James Frey; former Disney Chairman and CEO Michael Eisner; criminologist and father of "evidence-based policing" Lawrence Sherman; former Ohio Attorney General Jim Petro; former Princeton University President William Bowen; folklorist, oral historian, author, and podcast host Douglas A. Boyd; professor of religion at Goucher College and theologian at the Washington National Cathedral Kelly Brown Douglas; Randolph Marshall Hollerith, dean of the Washington National Cathedral; and George Stibitz, one of the fathers of modern digital computing.

== Presidents of Denison University ==
The following persons have led Denison University as president since its founding in 1831:

No.	Image	President	Term start	Term end
1		John Pratt	1831	1837
2		Jonathan Going	1837	1844
3		Silas Bailey	1846	1852
4		Jeremiah Hall	1853	1863
5		Samson Talbot	1863	1873
6		Elisha Andrews	1875	1879
7		Alfred Owen	1879	1886
8		Galusha Anderson	1887	1889
9		Daniel B. Purinton	1890	1901
10		Emory W. Hunt	1901	1912
11		Clark W. Chamberlain	1913	1927
12		Avery A. Shaw	1927	1940
13		Kenneth I. Brown	1940	1950
14		A. Blair Knapp	1951	1968
15		Joel P. Smith	1969	1976
16		Robert C. Good	1976	1984
17		Andrew G. De Rocco	1984	1988
18		Michele Tolela Myers	1989	1998
19		Dale T. Knobel	1998	2013
20		Adam S. Weinberg	2013	Present

== Academia ==
- Cynthia Baum - clinical psychologist and academic administrator
- David H. Bayley - pioneer in policing research and former Distinguished Professor Emeritus, School of Criminal Justice, SUNY Albany
- William G. Bowen - former president of Princeton University, current president of the Andrew W. Mellon Foundation
- Douglas A. Boyd - folklorist, oral historian, podcast host, and author, current director of the Louie B. Nunn Center for Oral History
- Richard Brandt - professor of philosophy, Swarthmore College and University of Michigan
- Ernest DeWitt Burton - biblical scholar
- George Cressey - geographer, author, and academic
- Frederick German Detweiler - sociologist
- George Amos Dorsey - ethnographer
- August F. Foerste - geologist, paleontologist, and science teacher
- Lottie Estelle Granger - president, Iowa State Teachers' Association
- Stephen Holmes - Walter E. Meyer Professor of Law, New York University
- John S. Lowe - professor and expert in energy law
- Roger H. Martin - 14th president of Randolph-Macon College
- Jeffrey Masten - Shakespeare and sexuality studies scholar, Northwestern University; Guggenheim fellow
- Kirtley F. Mather - geologist; professor and department chairman at Harvard University; civil libertarian and author
- Francis W. Shepardson - historian with the University of Chicago, first director of the Illinois Department of Registration and Education, secretary and director of the Rosenwald Fund
- Thomas Skidmore - historian and scholar specialized in Brazilian history
- Maria Tatar - John L. Loeb Professor of Germanic Languages and Literatures; chair of the Committee on Degrees in Folklore and Mythology at Harvard University
- Stephen Tuttle - musicologist and former chairman of the department of music at the University of Virginia

== Arts and entertainment ==
- Ned Bittinger - portrait painter and illustrator
- Charlie Burg - singer-songwriter
- Steve Carell - screen and television actor
- Roe Conn - radio personality, WLS 890AM, Chicago
- Tom Cotter - comedian
- Franklin Cover - stage, screen and television actor
- John Davidson - stage and television actor; game show host, including Hollywood Squares
- Luke Ebbin - Grammy-nominated record producer, songwriter and composer
- Jennifer Garner - screen and television actress
- Kyle Gordon - comedian
- Jeffrey Hatcher - playwright and screenwriter
- Hal Holbrook - stage, screen and television actor, known for portrayal of Mark Twain
- John Jeffcoat - screenwriter and film director, known for Outsourced
- Ademir Kenović - film director and producer
- Andrew Levitt - drag queen known as Nina West
- Nancy Lynn - acrobatic pilot, killed in 2006 Culpeper Airfest crash
- Ann Magnuson - actress, performance artist, and nightclub performer
- John Malm Jr. - former manager of Trent Reznor and his band Nine Inch Nails
- Daniel Meyer - conductor and musical director
- Alex Moffat - actor and comedian
- P-Star (Priscilla Diaz) - rapper, actress, singer, model, director, DJ
- Hollis Resnik - singer and actress
- José Rivera - first Puerto Rican screenwriter to be nominated for an Academy Award
- John Schuck - screen, stage, and television actor
- Kurt Vincent - director of The Lost Arcade
- Nina West, drag queen

== Business ==
- Samuel Armacost - former president, director, and CEO of BankAmerica Corporation
- Joe Banner - president and CEO of the Cleveland Browns
- Brad Blum - former CEO of Burger King
- George Bodenheimer - executive chairman of ESPN; former president of ESPN and ABC Sports
- John Canning Jr. - chairman, Madison Dearborn Partners
- Mark Dalton - CEO of the Tudor Investment Corporation
- Edward Andrew Deeds - engineer, inventor and industrialist
- Michael Eisner - former chairman and CEO of the Walt Disney Company
- William Esrey - former chief executive of Sprint Corporation
- John V. Faraci - chairman and chief executive officer of International Paper
- Bill Giles - chairman and part owner of Major League Baseball's Philadelphia Phillies
- Mark Haines - co-anchor of CNBC’s Squawk on the Street
- Terry Jones - founder of Travelocity.com and Kayak.com

== Economics ==
- Claudia Sahm - economist; creator of the Sahm rule

== Government ==
- Richard B. Austin - judge, United States District Court for the Northern District of Illinois
- Ruth Sarles Benedict - anti-war activist, researcher and journalist
- John T. Chain Jr. - retired U.S. Air Force general
- Robert Dold - U.S. representative for Illinois's 10th congressional district
- Edmund Burke Fairfield - minister, educator, and politician, including 12th lieutenant governor of Michigan
- Carty Finkbeiner - former mayor of Toledo, Ohio
- Tony P. Hall - United States Ambassador to the United Nations Agencies for Food and Agriculture and United States representative from Ohio
- Andrew S. Hanen - judge, United States District Court for the Southern District of Texas
- Judson Harmon - 45th governor of Ohio and 41st United States Attorney General
- Leonard D. Heaton - former Surgeon General of the United States Army
- Edgar Winters Hillyer - judge, United States District Court for the District of Nevada
- Douglas Holtz-Eakin - former director of the Congressional Budget Office and former chief economic policy adviser to U.S. Senator John McCain's 2008 presidential campaign
- Randy Hopper - former member of the Wisconsin State Senate
- Sue W. Kelly - former member of the United States Congress from New York
- Robert W. Levering - former United States congressman
- Richard Lugar - United States senator from Indiana; on the board of trustees
- George McConnaughey - chairman of FCC
- Kenneth E. Melson - former ATF director
- Jim Petro - former Ohio attorney general
- Jane Pringle - member of the Maine House of Representatives
- Lewis A. Sachs - former US Assistant Secretary of the Treasury
- A. W. Sheldon - associate justice, Arizona Territorial Supreme Court
- Erastus B. Tyler - Union Army general in the American Civil War
- H. Clay Van Voorhis - former US congressman
- Ed Weber - former US congressman
- Yu Tsune-chi - Chinese ambassador to Italy and Spain, United Nations delegate who took part in the San Francisco Conference
- Allen Zollars - justice of the Indiana Supreme Court

== Literature ==
- James Clear - author and speaker about habits
- James Frey - screenwriter and author; A Million Little Pieces, featured by Oprah's Book Club
- Michael Glaser - Poet Laureate of Maryland
- Pam Houston - author, speaker, teacher
- Lauren Shakely - poet, editor, and publisher

== Religion ==
- Roger Ames - American Anglican bishop
- Edgar J. Goodspeed - liberal theologian
- Randolph Hollerith - dean of Washington National Cathedral
- James Madison Pendleton - 19th-century Baptist preacher, educator and theologian

== Science ==
- Homer Burton Adkins - organic chemist
- John Berton - computer graphics animator and visual effects supervisor
- William Ernest Castle - early American geneticist
- William E. Forsythe - physicist
- Jeff Kimpel - atmospheric scientist; director of the National Severe Storms Laboratory
- George Stibitz - scientist, early pioneer of computer science with Bell Labs

== Sports ==
- Dan Daub - Major League Baseball player, 1892–1897
- Woody Hayes - football coach of Ohio State, 1951–1978
- Ken Meyer - former head coach of the National Football League's San Francisco 49ers
- Johnny O'Connell - professional sports car racer
- Bobby Rahal - Indianapolis 500 champion
- John Robic - assistant men's basketball coach at the University of Kentucky
- Nate Schmidt - assistant men's basketball coach at Iowa State University
