= Terry Jones (disambiguation) =

Terry Jones (1942–2020) was a Welsh actor, comedian, director, historian and writer.

Terry Jones may also refer to:

== Arts, entertainment and media ==
- Terry Jones (i-D) (born 1945), British co-founder of i-D style magazine
- Terry Jones (journalist) (born 1948), Canadian sports writer
- Terry Jones (born 1970), American Christian singer and Point of Grace member
- Terry Jones, English metal singer and Pagan Altar member
- Terry Jones (born 1988), English actor professionally known as Finn Jones

== Sports ==
- Terry Jones (baseball) (born 1971), American baseball player
- Terry Jones (defensive tackle) (born 1956), American football player (fl. 1978–1984)
- Terry Jones (ice hockey) (born 1946), Canadian ice-hockey player
- Terry Jones (journalist) (born 1948), Canadian sports writer
- Terry Jones (racing driver) (born 1971), Canadian stock-car racer and businessman
- Terry Jones (tight end) (born 1979), American football player (starting 2005)

== Other people ==
- Terry Jones (businessman) (fl. 1970s–2020s), American founder of Travelocity.com
- Terry Jones (pastor) (born 1951), American Christian cleric
- Terry David Jones (1938–2014), Canadian politician and property developer
- Terry Jones (politician), member of the North Dakota House of Representatives
