= Oral History Metadata Synchronizer =

The Oral History Metadata Synchronizer (OHMS) is a web application designed to enhance online access to oral history interviews. OHMS was originally designed and created by the Louie B. Nunn Center for Oral History, University of Kentucky Libraries in 2008 for deployment through the Kentucky Digital Library. In 2011, the Louie B. Nunn Center for Oral History received a grant from the Institute for Museum and Library Services to make the system open source and free to use with interoperability and sustainability as the primary goals. According to the Nunn Center, "The primary purpose for OHMS is to empower users to more effectively and efficiently discover information in an oral history interview online by connecting the user from a search result to the corresponding moment in an interview."

OHMS is a two-part system which includes the web app (the back-end) and the viewer (user interface). The web application is used to prepare the oral history interview by embedding timecode into a transcript or creating a time-coded index of the interview, which is then viewable online in the OHMS Viewer, accessible from the archive's chosen content management system. "The programme enables researchers to search through an oral history recording using keywords, and to be taken to the exact moment that the keyword is spoken. It means researchers do not have to scroll through hours of tape or pages of transcript before finding the topic they are interested in."

The original version of OHMS synchronized transcribed text with time code in the audio/video, as well as providing a user map/viewer that connected search results of a transcript to the corresponding moments in the audio or video. OHMS designer Doug Boyd writes, "OHMS inexpensively and efficiently encodes transcripts of interviews and then connects the transcripts to the corresponding moments in the audio or video interview."

In 2011, the Nunn Center introduced the Interview Indexing Module which allows indexing or annotation of an interview that corresponds to time-code. In his article in the Chronicle of Higher Education, Brad Wolverton writes about Doug Boyd's work on OHMS: "Through his work as director of the Louie B. Nunn Center for Oral History he’s developed a method for indexing audio and video recordings, making it easy for researchers to call up precise words without having to listen to endless hours of tape." In the Fall of 2011, the Institute for Museum and Library Services awarded the Nunn Center a National Leadership Grant of$195,853 to further develop OHMS for open source distribution. OHMS is currently being developed and the grant initiative is working with project partners to implement the system beyond the University of Kentucky.

== OHMS Viewer Examples ==
OHMS Viewer: synchronized transcript

OHMS Viewer: interview index

OHMS Viewer: synchronized transcript + interview index

OHMS Viewer: bilingual (synchronized transcript + translation)

== Development Timeline ==
According to the Nunn Center's OHMS Website:

2005: Louie B. Nunn Center for Oral History and UK Libraries' Digital Program began digitization and online access to oral histories. Team: Eric Weig, Kathryn Lybarger, Kopana Terry

2008: Only 50 interviews uploaded using the manual system. UK Libraries Hires Dr. Doug Boyd as Director of the Louie B. Nunn Center for Oral History. Boyd and Weig design system, work with contract programmer Dr. Jack Schmidt to implement initial version of OHMS. Team: Doug Boyd, Eric Weig, Jack Schmidt.

2009: UK Libraries' programmer Dr. MLE Slone works with Boyd and Weig to further develop OHMS and prepare initial functional specification. Team: Doug Boyd, Eric Weig, MLE Slone.

2011: Nunn Center outsources development of OHMS to Artifex Technology Consulting. Rewrites code completely, adds Indexing Module, adds support for video. Team: Doug Boyd, Eric Weig, MLE Slone, Artifex Technology Consulting.

2011: Receives Grant from Institute for Museum and Library Services

2012: Programmer James Howard hired to develop OHMS and prepare for distribution. Team: Doug Boyd, Eric Weig, James Howard.

2013: OHMS application made accessible to grant partners. Team: Doug Boyd, Eric Weig, James Howard.

2014: OHMS Application and viewer updates include YouTube compatibility, major upgrades to the Interview Manager.
