= Elisha Andrews =

American economist (1844–1917)

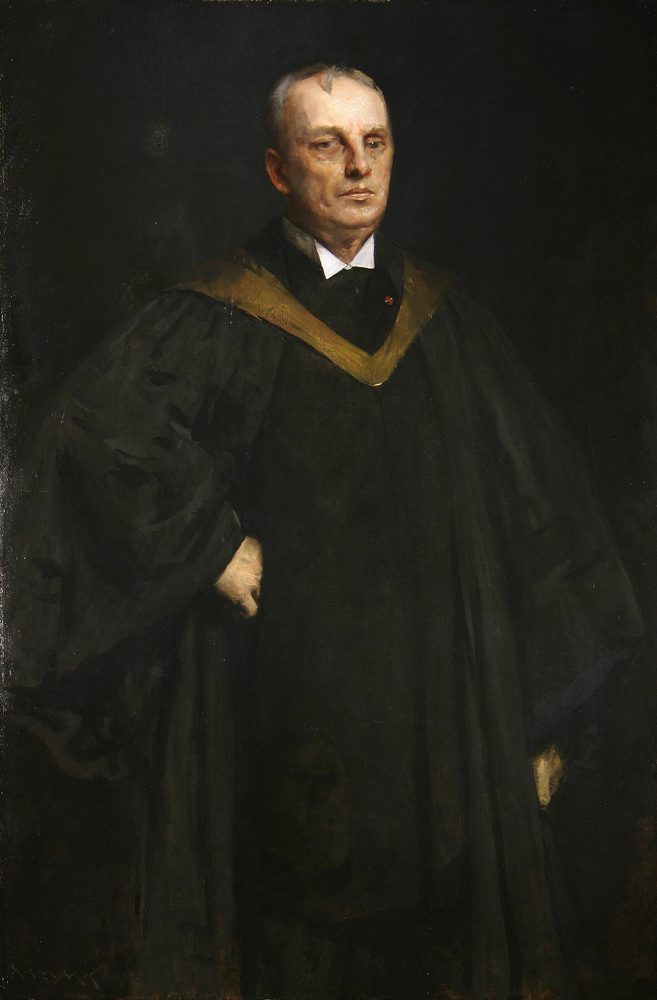
- Elisha Andrews, painted by William Merritt Chase

7th Chancellor of the University of Nebraska
- In office September 22, 1900 – November 6, 1908
- Preceded by: George Edwin MacLean
- Succeeded by: Samuel Avery

7th Superintendent of Chicago Public Schools
- In office 1898–1900
- Preceded by: Albert G. Lane
- Succeeded by: Edwin G. Cooley

8th President of Brown University
- In office 1889–1898
- Preceded by: Ezekiel Robinson
- Succeeded by: William Faunce

6th President of Denison University
- In office 1875–1879
- Preceded by: Samson Talbot
- Succeeded by: Alfred Owen

Personal details
- Born: January 10, 1844 Hinsdale, New Hampshire, US
- Died: October 30, 1917 (aged 73) Interlachen, Florida, US
- Education: Brown University

Military service
- Allegiance: (United States) United States; Union
- Branch/service: United States Army; Union Army
- Rank: Second Lieutenant
- Battles/wars: American Civil War

Elisha Benjamin Andrews (January 10, 1844 – October 30, 1917) was an American economist, soldier, and educator.

== Early life ==
Andrews was born in Hinsdale, New Hampshire.

== Career ==
He served in Connecticut regiments during the Civil War as a private and was later promoted through the ranks to 2nd lieutenant. He was wounded on August 24, 1865, at Petersburg.

Graduating from Brown University in 1870 and from the Newton Theological Institution in 1874, he preached for one year and then was president of Denison University from 1875 to 1879. He was professor of homiletics at Newton Theological Institution from 1879 to 1882; professor of history and political economy at Brown University from 1882 to 1888; professor of political economy and finance at Cornell University from 1888 to 1889; and he served as the president of Brown University from 1889 until 1898. He resigned as president of Brown in 1897 because of criticism by trustees of his advocacy of free silver but at that time withdrew his resignation. On February 1, 1890, he became a charter member and the organizing president of the Rhode Island Society of the Sons of the American Revolution (RISSAR). He was succeeded in that office later that year by John Nicholas Brown I. Ironically, although both Andrews and Brown were active in organizing the RISSAR, neither formally applied for membership in the organization.

In 1892, he was an American commissioner to the Brussels monetary conference and was a strong supporter of international bimetallism. He was also elected a member of the American Antiquarian Society in 1892.

He was the superintendent of schools for Chicago from 1898 to 1900, and then became chancellor of the University of Nebraska in 1900. He retired from academic life as chancellor emeritus of the University of Nebraska on January 1, 1909. He became a member of the corporation of Brown University in 1900 and was made president of the American Association of State Colleges and Universities in 1904.

Andrews died at his home in Interlachen, Florida, in 1917, aged 73.

== Publisher ==
Andrews published many college textbooks on history and economics, including:

- An Honest Dollar (1889; third edition, 1894)
- Wealth and Moral Law (1894)
- History of the United States (two volumes, 1894)
- History of the United States (six volumes, 1903–12)
- The History of the Last Quarter Century in the United States, 1870-95 (1896; revised under the title The United States in Our Own Time, 1903)

== Sources ==
- American National Biography, vol. 1, pp. 494–496.

Academic offices
Preceded by Ezekiel Robinson	President of Brown University; 1889–1898	Succeeded by William Faunce
