= Albert G. Lane =

Namesake of Chicago's Oldest and Largest High School

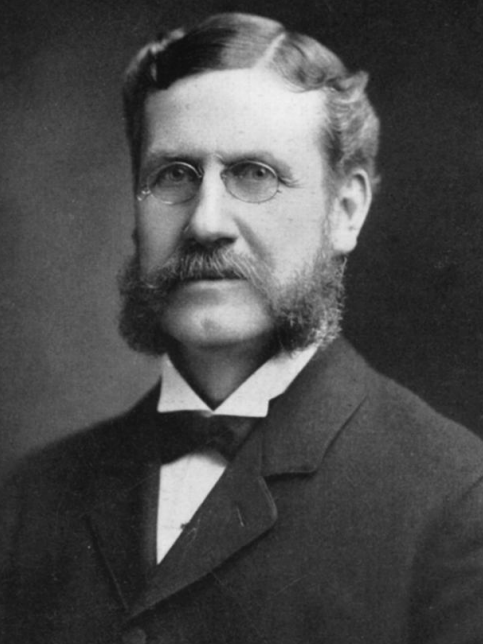

6th Superintendent of Chicago Public Schools
- In office December 1891 – July 13, 1898
- Preceded by: George C. Howland
- Succeeded by: Elisha Andrews

Cook County Superintendent of Public Instruction
- In office December 1877 – December 1891
- Preceded by: C. D. Plant
- Succeeded by: O.T. Bright
- In office December 1869 – December 1873
- Preceded by: John F. Eberhart
- Succeeded by: C. D. Plant

Personal details
- Born: March 15, 1841 Galewood, Illinois, US
- Died: August 22, 1906 (aged 65) Chicago, Illinois, US
- Resting place: Rosehill Cemetery
- Party: Republican
- Spouse: Frances Smallwood
- Children: 2
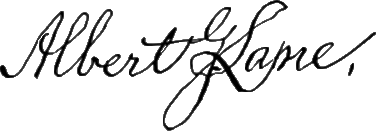
- Signature

Albert Grannis Lane (March 15, 1841 – August 22, 1906), was an American educator who served as superintendent of Chicago Public Schools, Cook County superintendent of public instruction, and president of the National Education Association.

Lane was a nationally respected educator, and was described in obituary articles in newspapers across the United States as, "one of the most widely known educators in the West".

== Early life ==
Lane was born on March 15, 1841, in Galewood, Illinois (an area later annexed by Chicago). Soon after his birth, his family moved into Chicago's city limits.

In 1858, Lane graduated in Chicago's first-ever high school graduating class from the city's first high school, Chicago High School.

== Principal of Franklin School ==
Upon his graduation from high school, at the age of 18, Lane was named principal of Franklin School. He is the youngest principal in the history of Chicago Public Schools. He served as principal for ten years, until 1868.

== Cook County superintendent of public instruction ==
Lane served two tenures as Cook County superintendent of public instruction. He served as a Republican. He was credited with making a number of innovations while in this position.

In 1869, Lane was first elected to the position.

Amid the panic of 1873, Franklin Bank, where he had deposited $33,000 of school funds, had failed. He sold off most of his personal property to help make up for this loss and continued to pay the school over the next nineteen years principal and interest amounting to $45,000 to make up for this financial loss which had occurred on his watch. Amid the political turbulence of 1873, Lane lost reelection, and left office as superintendent.

In the interregnum between his terms as county superintendent, Lane worked as a cashier at the Preston, Kean & Co's bank.

Lane again served as superintendent from 1877 through December 1891. He was elected in 1877. After, in order to move elections to even years, terms were shifted, the board formally elected Lane to serve a year-long term from 1881 until 1882. He won popular elections in 1882, 1886, and 1890.

The county superintendent was an ex officio member of the Cook County Board of Education. In this role, Lane was a key player in bringing in Francis Wayland Parker to lead the Cook County Normal School. In a matter of years, Parker's leadership elevated the institution to international prominence. Lane gave Parker his support, even amid challenging times.

Lane resigned as county superintendent in December 1891, in order to assume the position of superintendent of Chicago Public Schools.

== Superintendent of Chicago Public Schools ==
In December 1891, Lane began what became be a seven-year tenure as superintendent of Chicago Public Schools.

Lane found his tenure challenging, with city politicians regularly interfering with school affairs. Additionally, Lane's plans for the schools were greeted with a lack of support. During his challenging tenure, Lane's, previously strong, health began to decline.

== District superintendent of Chicago Public Schools ==
On July 13, 1898, the Chicago Board of Education voted to appoint President of Brown University Elisha Andrews as superintendent, instead of having Lane to continue as superintendent. However, they did vote to make Lane a district superintendent, which he accepted. He held this position until his death in August 1906.

== Other roles ==
In 1893, the National Education Association elected Lane as its president. Lane also served a tenure as president of the Illinois State Teachers' Association.

Lane served as a trustee of the YMCA.

== Personal life ==
In July 1878, Lane married Francis Smallwood. Together they had two children.

Lane was a Methodist.

=== Death ===
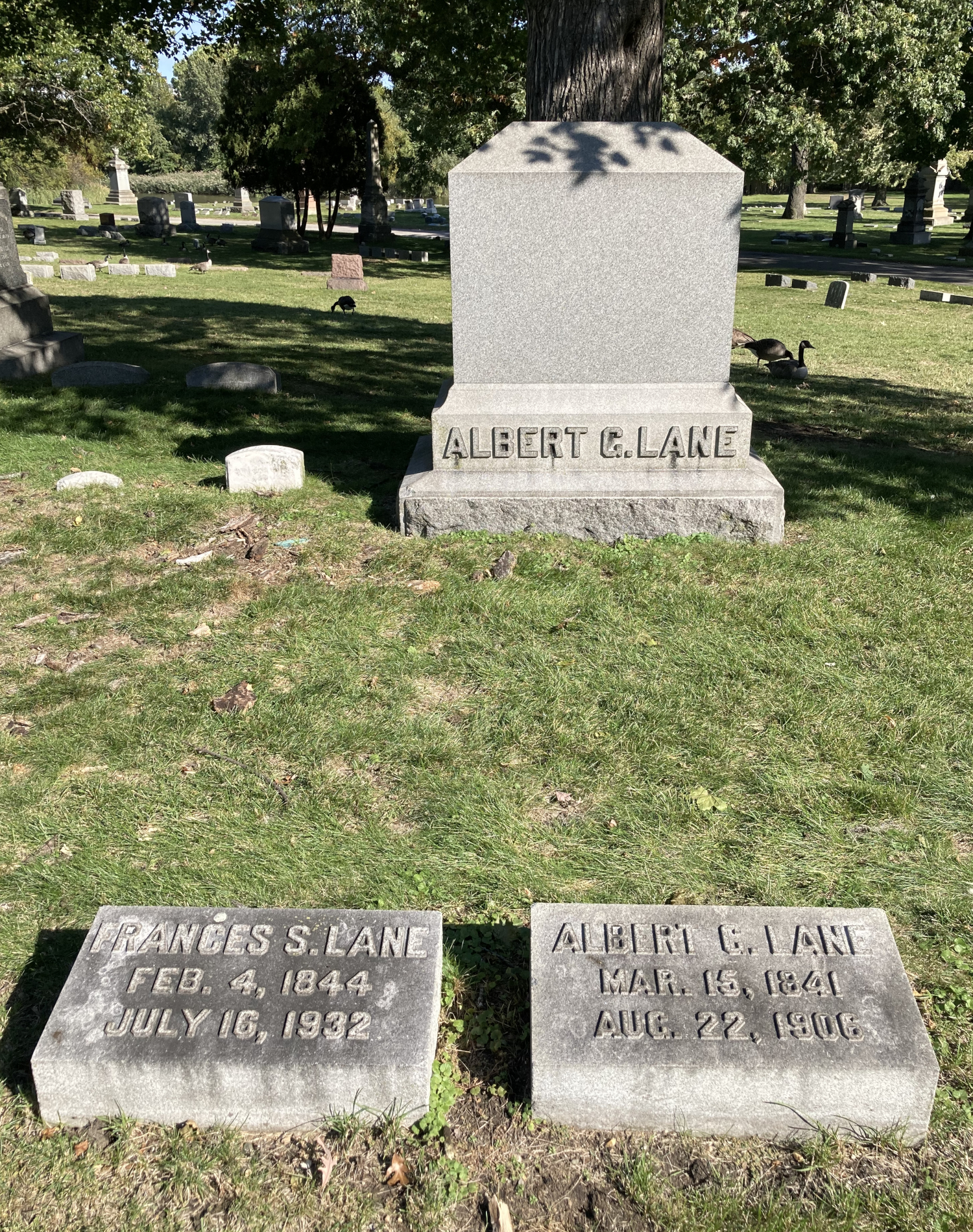
Lane's grave at Rosehill Cemetery

Having been in failing health for an extended period of time, Lane died at the age of 65 on August 22, 1906, at his Chicago residence. His death was attributed to nervous prostration, which was exacerbated by intense heat that the city was experiencing.

He was buried at Rosehill Cemetery.

== Legacy ==
Lane Tech College Prep High School, named for Lane, was founded to fulfill his vision of a large high school that would be dedicated to both providing students with hands-on experience in technical education and improving their academics.
