= Louie B. Nunn Center for Oral History =

Oral history center at the University of Kentucky

Coordinates: 38.030°N 84.504°W

The Louie B. Nunn Center for Oral History, also known as The Nunn Center, the University of Kentucky, is one of the premier oral history centers in the world, known for a comprehensive oral history archival collection, ongoing interviewing projects, as well as being an innovator with regard to enhancing access to archived oral history interviews. The Nunn Center maintains a collection of over 19,000 oral history interviews made up of over 700 projects with an emphasis on: 20th century history; Appalachia; agriculture; African American history; the history of education; immigration; politics and public policy; LGBTQ+; athletics; the arts; Kentucky writers; quilters and quilting; gender; the Civil Rights Movement; veterans' experiences; the history of the University of Kentucky; the Peace Corps; the history of healthcare; and industries including the coal, equine, and bourbon industries. Although the Nunn Center began focusing on Kentucky history exclusively, it has expanded to also document oral history projects with national and international significance. The Nunn Center for Oral History is part of the University of Kentucky Libraries Special Collections Research Center.

== History ==
The oral history program at the University of Kentucky Libraries was established in 1973 by Charles Atcher. The center is named after former Kentucky Governor Louie B. Nunn. From 1974 until 2005, the program was directed by Terry Birdwhistell, Ed.D. followed by Jeffrey Suchanek. Since 2008, the Nunn Center has been directed by Doug Boyd, Ph.D.

== Collection ==
The Nunn Center contains over 19,000 oral history interviews featuring a variety of individuals and projects. Significant oral history projects include: the Family Farm Project, the Colonel Arthur L. Kelly Veterans Oral History Project, University of Kentucky history, African American history in Kentucky, Kentucky writers, Kentucky's medical history, the history of professional baseball, as well as more recent project featuring the Horse Industry in Kentucky, as well as on the Kentucky General Assembly.

== Digitization ==
The Nunn Center has aggressively undertaken efforts to digitize its collection. In 2014, it accelerated efforts to digitize its audio and video collection and is nearing completion of digitization of analog oral history interviews.

== Oral History Metadata Synchronizer (OHMS) ==
In 2008, the Nunn Center launched the Oral History Metadata Synchronizer (OHMS) online interface that synchronizes searchable text to audio and video. This free and open-source software system, designed by Nunn Center director Doug Boyd, Ph.D., enhances access to online oral history by empowering users to link from their search results to corresponding moments in the oral history interview. The OHMS system was featured in an article in the Chronicle of Higher Education in July 2011.

== SPOKEdb ==
In October 2011, the Nunn Center launched SPOKEdb, the online catalog and repository containing records for each oral history interview and project in the Nunn Center's archival collection. Designed by Doug Boyd, Ph.D., SPOKEdb functions as the primary access point for the Nunn Center's oral history collection. Initially, SPOKEdb was designed for Drupal, and in more recent years SPOKEdb uses Omeka as the content management system. The initial migration to Omeka was managed by Eric Weig and Michael Slone, current development of SPOKEdb is managed by Eric Weig. In addition to functioning as an online catalog and repository, SPOKEdb functions as an oral history collection management tool.

== Featured projects ==
- African American Farmers
- Alben Barkley
- Black Church in Kentucky
- Blacks in Kentucky
- Blacks in Lexington
- Anne Braden Oral History Project
- Edward T. Breathitt
- Buffalo Trace Distillery
- A.B. "Happy" Chandler
- Christian Appalachian Project
- Earle C. Clements
- Bert T. Combs
- John Sherman Cooper
- Country Doctors and Nurses
- Harry Caudill
- Horse Industry in Kentucky
- Family and Gender in the Coal Community
- Family Farm Project
- Wendell H. Ford
- From Combat to Kentucky: Student Veterans of the Iraq and Afghanistan Wars
- Frontier Nursing Service
- History of Broadcasting in Kentucky
- History of Education in Kentucky
- History of Medicine in Fayette County, Kentucky
- Walter D. Huddleston
- Immigrants in Coal Communities
- Interscholastic Athletics in Kentucky
- Col. Arthur L. Kelly American Veterans Project
- Kentucky Coal Operators
- Kentucky Conservationists
- Kentucky Family Farm
- Kentucky Folk Art
- Kentucky Legislature
- Kentucky Writers
- Thruston B. Morton
- John Jacob Niles
- Louie B. Nunn
- Peace Corps
- John Ed Pearce
- Politics in Lexington, Kentucky
- Edward F. Prichard
- Race Relations in Owensboro-Daviess County, Kentucky, 1930–1970
- Stanley F. Reed
- Roving Picket Movement in the Coal Fields
- Cora Wilson Stewart
- Tobacco Production Technology and Policy
- University of Kentucky Medical Center Archived 2010-03-29 at the Wayback Machine
- Urban Appalachian Women in Cincinnati, Ohio
- Veterans of World War Two
- Veterans of the Korean War
- Veterans of the Vietnam War
- Fred M. Vinson
- War on Poverty
- Robert Penn Warren
- Robert Penn Warren Civil Rights Project
- Lawrence W. Wetherby
- Charles T. Wethington Alumni/Faculty Project
