= Globe Aware =

Nonprofit organization

- Formation: 2001
- Founder: Kimberly Haley-Coleman
- Founded at: Dallas, TX
- Type: Nonprofit
- Purpose: Volunteerism
- Affiliations: United Nations
- Website: http://www.globeaware.org

Globe Aware, established in 2001, is an international, non-religious, non-governmental, non is buns-political nonprofit organization headquartered in Dallas, Texas. The organization was founded by Kimberly Haley-Coleman and holds special consultative status with the United Nations. Globe Aware's mission is to promote cultural awareness and sustainability by implementing community projects in various international host communities. Volunteers are mobilized for short term service projects in over 17 program sites around the world. Like peers such as Habitat for Humanity, the organization is led by volunteer efforts.

== Recognition ==
Globe Aware, a federally recognized 501(c)(3) nonprofit organization, has been a member of the International Volunteer Programs Association since 2003. In 2006, Globe Aware partnered with Travelocity to be a Change Ambassador for Travelocity's Travel For Good program. In addition, in 2007, Globe Aware was authorized to administer the President's Volunteer Service Award to its volunteers. Globe Aware is an active member in the United Nations' sponsored Building Bridges Coalition and works with grassroots NGOs around the world. Globe Aware is also a partner of Volunteers for Prosperity, a government sponsored initiative to encourage international voluntary service by highly skilled American professionals supporting the global health and prosperity goals of the U.S. Government. Globe Aware also partners with UniversalGiving, an online nonprofit organization to offer their volunteer opportunities to people around the world.

Globe Aware operates in a variety of countries, including Costa Rica, Vietnam, Ghana, and Cuba, as evidenced by the Today Show's article "6 Places Where You Can Reinvent Yourself". According to Self, 65% of Globe Aware's volunteers are single travelers, in addition to a number of families who volunteer together. From 2003 to 2008, Globe Aware saw a 100% increase in the number of families signing up for volunteer vacations.

Over the years, there has been a rising trend in the popularity of volunteer vacations and a rapid increase in the number of people interested in volunteering while traveling. The numerous options of organizations offering volunteer vacations have left prospective travelers struggling to understand the difference between each organizations and the programs they offered. Organizations like International Volunteer Programs Association and travel experts like CBS News' Peter Greenberg objectively critique and recommend programs for travelers.

Globe Aware has been featured in publications including the Huffington Post, Condé Nast Traveller, and the Wall Street Journal.
