= Terry Jones (journalist) =

Canadian journalist and author

- Born: June 25, 1948 (age 78); Lacombe, Alberta, Canada
- Occupations: sports journalist, author
- Employer(s): Edmonton Sun (1982–present); Edmonton Journal (1967–1982)
- Spouse: Linda Jones
- Children: 3
- Awards: Elmer Ferguson Memorial Award, induction into the Hockey Hall of Fame, Alberta Sports Hall of Fame, Canadian Football Hall of Fame, Canadian Curling Hall of Fame

Terry Jones, nicknamed Large or Jonesy, (born June 25, 1948) is a Canadian journalist and author based in Edmonton, Alberta. He is currently a sports columnist with the Edmonton Sun.

Jones was born in Lacombe, Alberta in 1948. He began his sports journalism career when he was in Grade 7 when he wrote sports stories for the Lacombe Globe. He had a syndicated sports column by the time he was in Grade 9, on high school football, published in rural Alberta newspapers.

In Grade 10, Jones wrote for the Red Deer Advocate, a daily newspaper. In 1967, Jones began his career with the Edmonton Journal. He has covered the Edmonton Oilers from their World Hockey Association days to their present team. Jones also drew a cartoon of Snoopy from Peanuts for the first cover of the Journal's Saturday comics magazine in January 1978.

In 1982, Jones became sports columnist at the Edmonton Sun. During his career as a journalist, he has covered 16 Olympic Games (a Canadian journalism record), over 500 Stanley Cup Playoff games, over 37 Grey Cups, over 20 Super Bowl games, Briers, and countless Canada Cup and IIHF World Hockey Championships. Jones had also interviewed Joe DiMaggio, notorious for his media shyness, in the 1980s. He authored books on the career of Wayne Gretzky.

In 2011, Jones received the Elmer Ferguson Memorial Award. Upon this honour he was congratulated by, among many, the Edmonton Oilers and Hall of Famer Wayne Gretzky.

Other honours he received include Canadian Sports Media sportswriter of the year, and inductions into the Alberta Sports Hall of Fame (2002) and Canadian Football Hall of Fame (2002). He is the third Edmonton sports media member to earn a place in the Hockey Hall of Fame, joining Rod Phillips and Jim Matheson.

In 2012, he received a Lifetime Award, the Sports Media Canada George Gross Award for Career Achievement, from Sports Media Canada. He is also a recipient of the Dough Gilbert Award, Bell Memorial Award, Sun Media's ultimate journalism award in 2001, and the Doug Creighton Award for Editorial Excellence.

In 2020, Terry was accused of racism by then BC Lions general manager Ed Hervey.

He is married to Linda and has three children; a son, Shane (also a sports journalist), and twin daughters. He resides in Sherwood Park, Alberta.
