= Yu Tsune-chi =

Chinese diplomat

Yu Tsune-chi (Chinese: 于焌吉; pinyin: Yú Jùnjí; Wade–Giles: Yu Chun-chi; 1899 – February 25, 1968), also known as James T. C. Yu, was a Chinese diplomat. He served as the Chinese Ambassador to Italy and Spain.

== Biography ==
Yu was born in Zhili province in 1899. He graduated from Tianjin Nankai High School in 1918 and earned his Ph.B. and B.S. from Denison University in 1921. He then received his A.B. and M.A. from Columbia University in 1922. He also has a Sc.M. and Sc.D. from New York University, and a Ph.D. from Columbia. He then studied at the London School of Economics as a fellow, doing research in international law.

After returning to China, Yu joined the Ministry of Foreign Affairs of the Republic of China and served in the Wuhan and Nanjing Nationalist Governments. He also held posts in the Central Headquarters of the Kuomintang and the Judicial Yuan from 1928 to 1929.

Yu was made Consul General of the ROC at Havana in 1930, and Consul General at San Francisco in 1931. He was appointed First Secretary of the Chinese Legation at Washington, D.C. in 1931, before returning to Havana as Consul General and served in that role until 1935. He subsequently served as Consul General at New York City until 1945. He took part in the United Nations Conference on International Organization in 1945 as Assistant Secretary General of the Chinese Delegation.

In 1946, Yu was appointed Chinese Ambassador to Italy, serving in that role until 1966. He also concurrently served as Ambassador to Spain and alternate Chinese delegate to the United Nations and delegate to the International Labor Conference. Yu died in Taipei in 1968.
