= Roger H. Martin =

American educator

Roger Harry Martin
- Education: B.A. from Drew University; B.D. from Yale Divinity School; D.Phil. from Oxford University
- Occupation(s): President Emeritus of Randolph-Macon College, Executive Director of the British Schools and Universities Foundation
- Spouse: Susan Bradford Martin

Roger Martin (born 1943), also known as Rusty, served as the 14th president of Randolph-Macon College, an independent liberal arts college located in Ashland, Virginia, from July 1997 until January 2006.Today, he is president of Academic Collaborations Inc., a higher education consulting firm. He also serves as executive director of the British Schools and Universities Foundation in New York City.

== Education ==
Martin attended Denison University in Granville, Ohio before graduating from Drew University in Madison, New Jersey. He then received a B.D. from Yale Divinity School and the D.Phil. from Oxford University where he was a member of Lincoln College .

== Achievements and Honors ==
Martin has spent his entire adult life in higher education, serving institutions like Rensselaer Polytechnic Institute and New York University before going on to Middlebury College where he was assistant professor of history and assistant to the President from 1976 to 1980. From 1980 to 1986, he was Associate Dean of the Divinity School at Harvard University and Lecturer on British Church History. Then, for the next twenty years, he served as president and professor of history at two liberal arts colleges, Moravian College in Bethlehem, Pennsylvania from 1986 to 1997 and Randolph-Macon College in Ashland, Virginia from 1997 to 2006.

Martin is author of Racing Odysseus: A College President Becomes a Freshman Again (University of California Press: 2008) which tells the story of his six-month sabbatical at St. John's College, the Great Books School, in Annapolis, Maryland, in 2004 where he enrolled as a 61-year-old freshman. At St. John's he read Homer, Plato, Aeschylus, and Herodotus, and went out for crew, racing at the Head of the Occoquan with eight teenagers.

He is also the author of Off to College: A Guide for Parents (University of Chicago Press: 2015) which provides the parents of first-year college students with a comprehensive view of what their children will experience after leaving high school and home for college, and Brave Noises: Journal of a First-year College President (Amazon.com: 2015) which tells of the author's first year as a college president including how he got the job.

Dr. Martin is the recipient of honorary doctorates from Lehigh University, Moravian College, Drew University, Randolph-Macon College, and Morningside College.
