= Pam Houston =

American writer and academic

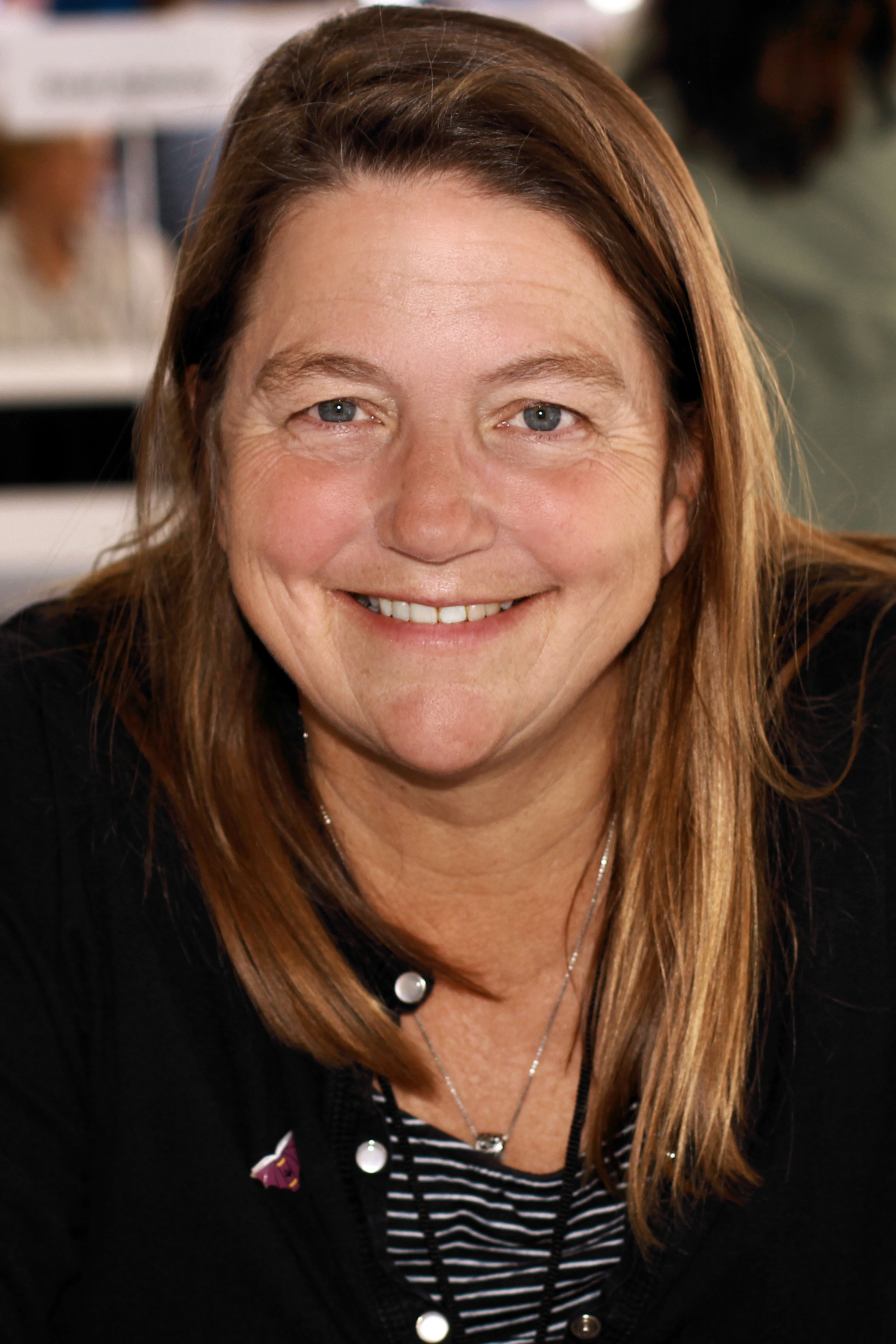
Houston at the 2019 Texas Book Festival

Pam Houston (born January 9, 1962, in Trenton, New Jersey) is an American author of short stories, novels and essays. She is best known for her first book, Cowboys Are My Weakness (1992), which has been translated into nine languages, and which won the 1993 Western States Book Award. Cowboys Are My Weakness was named a New York Times Notable Book in 1992.

Houston's stories have been selected for volumes of Best American Short Stories, The O. Henry Awards, The Pushcart Prize, and Best American Short Stories of the Century. She is a winner of the Western States Book Award, the WILLA award for contemporary fiction, and The Evil Companions Literary Award, and multiple teaching awards.

Major themes in Houston's work include relationships between men and women, the outdoors, animals and childhood trauma.

== Personal life ==
Houston was raised in Bethlehem, Pennsylvania. Her parents were an actress and a businessman. She attended Denison University in Ohio, graduating in 1983 with a BA in English. She held several odd jobs before entering a graduate program at the University of Utah. She took up an appointment as the Lois and Willard Mackey Chair in Creative Writing at Beloit College in the academic year 2002-2003. She currently teaches in the MFA program at U.C. Davis, and at the Institute of American Indian Arts in Santa Fe. She directs the nonprofit Writing By Writers which puts on non-university based writing conferences across the American West and in France. Houston currently lives on a ranch at 9,000' above sea level in Colorado, near the headwaters of the Rio Grande River.

== Books ==
- "Cowboys Are My Weakness". Paperback: 171 pages, Publisher: Washington Square Press (February 1, 1993), ISBN 978-0671793883
- "Waltzing the Cat". Paperback: 288 pages, Publisher: Washington Square Press; First Edition (September 1, 1999), ISBN 978-0671026370
- "A Little More About Me". Paperback: 304 pages, Publisher: Washington Square Press (October 1, 2000), ISBN 978-0743406338
- "Sight Hound: A Novel". Paperback: 352 pages, Publisher: W. W. Norton & Company; Reprint edition (January 17, 2006), ISBN 978-0393058178
- "Contents May Have Shifted: A Novel". Hardcover: 320 pages, Publisher: W. W. Norton & Company; 1 edition (February 6, 2012), ISBN 0393082652, ISBN 978-0393082654
- Deep Creek: Finding Hope in the High Country, Hardcover: 288 pages, Publisher: W. W. Norton & Company, (January 29, 2019) ISBN 978-0393241020

== Education and interests ==
B.A. (Denison University, Granville, Ohio) 1983; M.A., University of Utah, 1992; Creative writing (fiction, nonfiction and plays), modernism, contemporary fiction, the short story, wilderness literature
