= Brad Blum =

American businessman

Bradley Blum
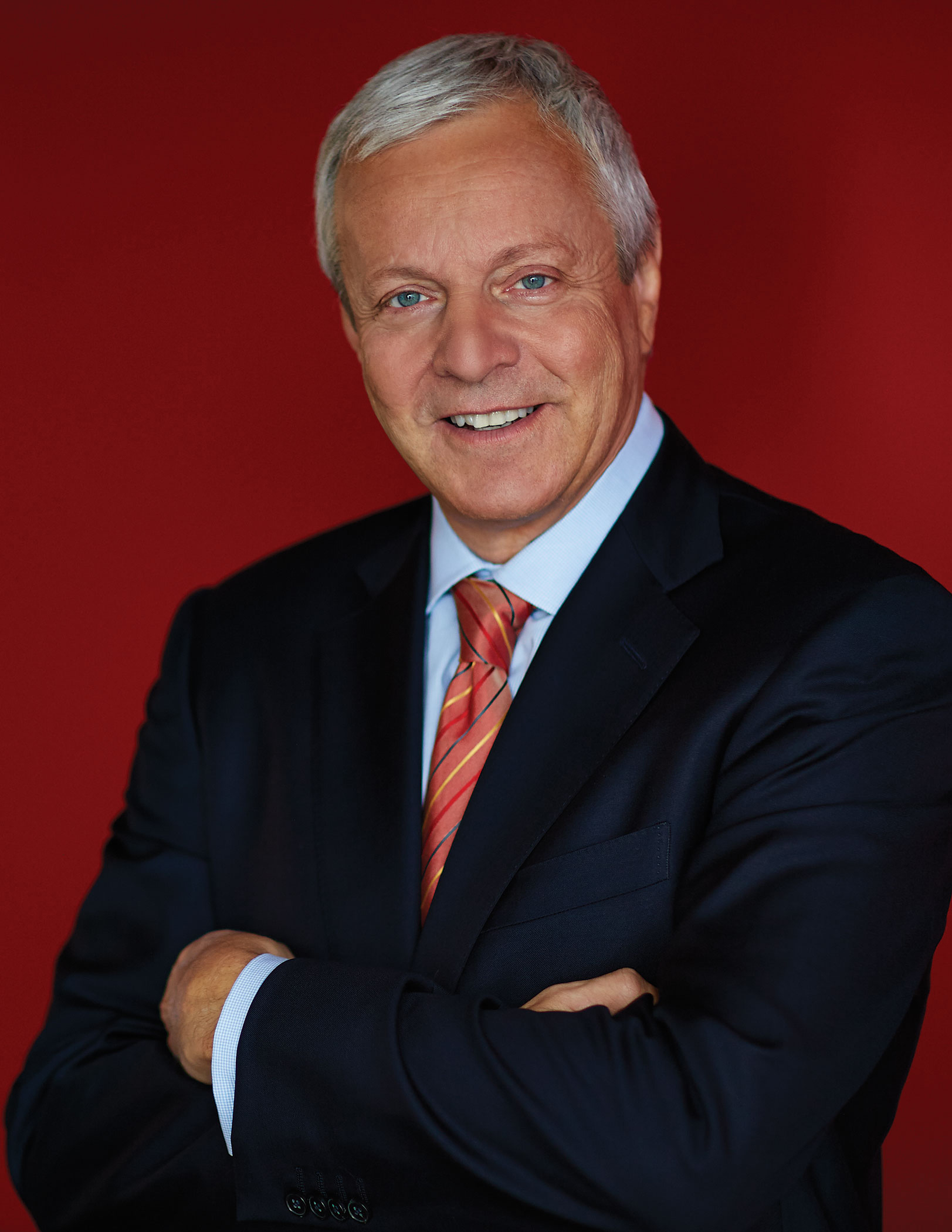
- Blum in 2014
- Born: 1953 (age 72–73)
- Education: Denison University (BA); Northwestern Kellogg Graduate School of Management (MBA)
- Title: Founder & CEO, Blum Enterprises; Former President, Olive Garden Italian Restaurants; Former CEO Burger King Corporation; Former CEO Romano’s Macaroni Grill; Founder and CEO FoodFirst Global Restaurants, Inc.
- Board member of: Director of Darden Restaurants; LEON Naturally Fast Food (UK)
- Awards: October 2000 - MUFSO (Multi-Unit Food Service Operators) Operator of the Year Award, Nation’s Restaurant News, October 2000; Nation’s Restaurant News Menu Masters Innovator of the Year (2010)

Bradley D. Blum (born 1953) is an American businessman. He is the co-owner of FoodFirst Global Restaurants. He was the founder, chairman and CEO of FoodFirst Global Restaurants, Inc., upon the establishment of the company in May 2018. Previously he was the CEO of Burger King from December 2002 to July 2, 2004. He joined the company from Darden Restaurants, where he had headed the Olive Garden unit, but left after only 18 months citing strategic differences with Burger King's board. Blum was the CEO of Romano's Macaroni Grill from December 2008 to July 2010. In 2013 Blum co-founded Five to Seven, a restaurant investment firm that focused on “Good Food for the Planet” based on several central tenets.

== Education ==
Blum graduated from Mariemont High School in 1972. Blum graduated from Denison University with a BA in economics and urban studies. He continued his formal education by earning an MBA in marketing and finance from Northwestern's J.L. Kellogg Graduate School of Management.

== Career ==
=== General Mills ===
After college, Blum worked with General Mills as a marketing executive. He worked at General Mills on both a national and international level.

Blum helped to lead a start-up company called "Cereal Partners Worldwide" (CPW) in Switzerland; they had partnered up with Nestlé for an equal interest in the company, 50/50. Cereal Partners Worldwide is a large international company with an annual turnover of about two billion US dollars. Blum is credited with putting the first female athlete on a Wheaties box (Mary Lou Retton), and with putting the first African American athlete on a Wheaties box (Walter Payton). Blum also invented a new cereal for General Mills: Cinnamon Toast Crunch.

=== Olive Garden ===
Starting in 1994, Blum left General Mills and joined Olive Garden as its executive vice president of marketing. He was later promoted to president. For the next eight years he oversaw Olive Garden's growth. Under Blum's leadership as the chief executive, Olive Garden achieved 57 consecutive quarters of same-restaurant sales increases, with continually increasing profits. The company's restaurant branch average increased by 67 percent during Blum's time there. In 2000, he won the MUFSO (Multi-Unit Foodservice Operators) Operator of the Year, a very high honor within the restaurant industry. In early 2002, he left Olive Garden.

=== Darden Restaurants ===
In March 2002, Blum was appointed vice chairman of Darden Restaurants, the parent company of the Olive Garden chain. He oversaw Olive Garden and served as acting president of Smokey Bones BBQ. Blum was responsible for quality assurance, purchasing, and distribution across all Darden-owned brands, including the global seafood supply for Red Lobster. He also evaluated emerging restaurant concepts for potential acquisitions.

=== Burger King ===
Blum was named the CEO of Burger King in late 2002, having been hired to turn the declining company around. He was hired after Diageo sold Burger King Corporation to the private equity group of Texas Pacific Group, Bain Capital, and Goldman Sachs. During his tenure at Burger King, Blum oversaw the company's improvement in its financial performance. In his first year, profits doubled and positive growth was trending; the average restaurant sales increased from a loss of 7% to a growth of 4%. This proved advantageous when the company initiated an IPO in 2006.

=== Romano's Macaroni Grill ===
In late 2008, Romano's Macaroni Grill was suffering declines in sales, profits, and market share of the casual dining industry, and hired Blum as its CEO. He oversaw a turnaround in the same-restaurant sales from an annual loss of 11% to a 3% profit. Macaroni Grill's change in fortunes was partially based on a complete revamp of the chain's menu, reorienting its cooking style on a more Mediterranean method of preparing and cooking food. In the first fifteen months, the changes to the menu not only improved the quality of the chain's products but also lowered its production costs. The caloric content of the products was reduced by 49% from the previous menu, along with a 59% reduction in fat and a 46% reduction in sodium. Blum's name for the change was called "Quality up, Costs down." As a result of these menu improvements, customer satisfaction rate for the chain grew. In May 2010, Nation's Restaurant News named Blum the Menu Master's Innovator of the Year in the restaurant industry for his accomplishments at Macaroni Grill.

=== Five to Seven ===
In 2013 Blum co-launched the investment vehicle Five to Seven with John Vincent. The goal of his work here was to invest in restaurants the would fall under the category of "Good Food for the Planet". Blum has stated that the central tenets of this are that the food is "exceptionally good tasting; remarkably good for you; a good everyday value; and good for the environment – plus you should feel good after eating it." Winter Park Magazine wrote of this work that, "Blum is a visionary whose business accomplishments have made him a legendary figure in the food industry. Now, he’s tackling a worsening national problem — the obesity and diabetes epidemics, caused in large part by the food we eat — using insider knowledge and the same passion that he brought to bear as a CEO in the business world."

=== FoodFirst Global Restaurants ===
Blum and Brazilian-based investment firm GP Investments, Ltd. formed FoodFirst Global Restaurants, Inc. and acquired its first brands, Brio Tuscan Grille™ (Brio) and Bravo Cucina Italiana™ (Bravo) on May 24, 2018. In early 2020, Blum resigned as chairman and CEO but remains a Co-Owner of the company.

== Personal life ==
Blum's hometown is Cincinnati, Ohio. His hobby is auto racing.
