= Travelocity =

Online travel agency

Travelocity.com
- Company type: Subsidiary
- Website type: Travel agency
- Founded: January 1996; 30 years ago
- Headquarters: Dallas, Texas, U.S.
- Industry: Travel
- Parent: Expedia Group
- Website: www.travelocity.com

Travelocity is an online travel agency owned by the American travel group Expedia Group. One of the pioneers of web-based disintermediation, Travelocity was the first website that allowed consumers the ability to purchase travel tickets without the help of a person. In addition to airfares, the site also permits consumers to book hotel rooms, rental cars, cruises and packaged vacations.

== History ==
=== Early history ===
Travelocity has origins to 1978 when American Airlines began offering travel agencies access to its electronic reservation system known as Sabre. In the mid-1980s, began offering it to consumers under the eAAsySabre brand name on both CompuServe and GEnie. The CEO of eAAsySabre was Kathy Misunas. Under the "Saabre" brand, it was a popular feature of online services such as Prodigy and America Online in the early 1990s.

Travelocity was officially created in 1995 as a joint venture between Worldview Systems Corporation and Sabre Corporation. The founding team at Worldview conceived of the idea in 1994 as an extension to their online travel database offering which had been distributed through Sabre, Bloomberg, AOL and many others. The founding team at Worldview joined with distribution partner Sabre in a 50-50 JV that resulted in the development and launch of Travelocity in 1995-1996. In 1996, Worldview's investors, Advance Publications and Ameritech, sold their stake in Travelocity to Sabre Corporation. It was run by long-time Sabre information technology executive Terry Jones.

Travelocity gained popularity after a 1999 partnership with AOL. In 2000, Sabre negotiated a merger of Travelocity with Preview Travel. The resulting company was listed on the NASDAQ stock exchange, with Sabre owning around 70% of the company.

In March 2002, Sabre reacquired all outstanding shares of the brand via a tender offer. Jones left the company shortly afterward, in May 2002. It also acquired last minute travel specialist Site59.com the same year. The CEO and founder of Site59, Michelle Peluso, joined Travelocity with the acquisition as senior vice president, product strategy and distribution. Peluso became Travelocity's COO in April 2003 and was then named president and chief executive officer of Travelocity in December 2003. Many members of Peluso's former management team at Site59 were appointed to senior management positions at Travelocity.

In 2004, Travelocity introduced an advertising campaign known as "Where Is My Gnome?". In 2005, Travelocity acquired lastminute.com for £577 million. The acquisition included allhotels.com, which was founded in 1997 by Richard Irwin, acquired by Online Travel Corporation (OTC) in 2002 for £1.4 million, and later acquired by lastminute.com in 2004.

In January 2009, CEO Michelle Peluso announced her resignation and was replaced by Sabre executive Hugh Jones. In April 2011, president and CEO Hugh Jones moved to a position at Sabre and Gilt Groupe president Carl Sparks was brought in as president and CEO of Travelocity. Sparks had been general manager of Hotels.com and was previously chief marketing officer of Expedia.

In December 2012, Travelocity sold Zuji to Webjet for $25 million. In June 2013, Travelocity Business, a corporate travel agency, was sold to Atlanta, Georgia-based BCD Travel. In August 2013, Expedia Inc. announced an agreement with Travelocity to power its United States and Canadian websites. In November 2013, Travelocity shut down its IgoUgo website.

In May 2014, CEO Carl Sparks stepped down as CEO of Travelocity. After the departure of Sparks, Roshan Mendis, President of Travelocity was named to manage operations of Travelocity's operations in the Americas, while Matthew Crummack, CEO of lastminute.com was named to manage operations in Europe. In December 2014, Travelocity sold lastminute.com to Swiss-based Bravofly Rumbo for £76 million.

=== 2015 to present; Ownership by Expedia ===
In January 2015, Sabre sold Travelocity to Expedia, Inc. for $280 million. The same year, it hired Assembly in New York to handle US media. Until then, media had been handled by Publics Groupe's Zenith Media. It also relaunched its Travel for Good program that offers a $5,000 grant for a selected volunteer to participate in volunteer travel programs with various nonprofit organizations, including Habitat for Humanity, Globe Aware, and the American Hiking Society.

In February 2016, Travelocity launched its Wander Wisely advertising campaign featuring the Roaming Gnome and "The Customer 1st Guarantee". The tagline was also changed from "Go and Smell the Roses" to "Wander Wisely". It has also been a longstanding sponsor of the American reality show The Amazing Race, sponsoring the series from the first season until season 34, when they were replaced by parent company Expedia.

== Controversies ==
=== Drop pricing; exclusion of surcharges ===
In July 2012, the United States Department of Transportation (DOT) fined Travelocity $180,000 after discovering that Travelocity's "flexible dates tool" did not always include fuel surcharges that were part of many international airfares, in violation of DOT rules requiring all carrier-imposed surcharges and fees to be included in every advertised fare. In addition, the DOT found that the customer was informed only on the final page before purchasing the ticket that some itineraries required a paper ticket with a minimum additional delivery fee of $29.95.

=== Cancellation of trips booked with promo code ===
In August 2012, Travelocity offered a $200 coupon code to attendees at the National Federation of the Blind annual conference in Dallas. After the NFB posted the code on Twitter without mentioning the attendee restriction, Travelocity re-tweeted it without noticing the error but deleted the tweet a day later. After some travel blogs and message boards re-posted the code, many ineligible travelers used the code. Travelocity responded by cancelling all trips of people that used the code who were not on the list of attendees at the NFB annual conference. This resulted in a barrage of complaints from customers.
