= Douglas A. Boyd =

American historian

Douglas A. Boyd is an oral historian, archivist, folklorist, musician, and author and currently directs the Louie B. Nunn Center for Oral History at the University of Kentucky. He graduated from Denison University with a B.A. in History and graduated from Indiana University Bloomington with an M.A. and Ph.D. in folklore. He is known for his work regarding oral history and digital technologies including his work designing and managing the OHMS system (Oral History Metadata Synchronizer). Recently served as executive producer of the documentary Kentucky Bourbon Tales: Distilling the Family Spirit, as well as the award-winning documentary Quest for the Perfect Bourbon: Voices of Buffalo Trace Distillery and is active in the Oral History Association, Society for American Archivists, and the American Folklore Society. Formerly, Boyd managed the digital program for the University of Alabama Libraries, directed the Kentucky Oral History Commission, and served as the senior archivist for the folklife and oral history collections at the Kentucky Historical Society. He is co-editor of Oral History and Digital Humanities: Voice, Access, and Engagement with Mary A. Larson. Boyd is also author of Crawfish Bottom: Recovering a Lost Kentucky Community which was published by University Press of Kentucky and was featured on C-Span's Book TV. He also regularly appears on the radio show Saving Stories]. He is also the producer/host of The Wisdom Project Podcast.

== Oral History and Digital Technology ==
Doug Boyd is a recognized national leader regarding oral history, preservation, archives and digital technologies Boyd served as project manager and co-editor for the Oral History in the Digital Age best practices initiative, served as keynote speaker for the Oral History Association's annual meeting in 2011. More recently Boyd leads the team that envisioned, designed and implemented the open source OHMS system that synchronizes text with audio and video online. He also recently launched and open-source, online oral history collection management database system called SPOKEdb. Additionally, he has produced short informational videos on YouTube regarding common digital recorders utilized by oral historians.

== Works and publications ==
- Glassie, Henry, and Doug Boyd. The Stars of Ballymenone: Stories, Songs and Instrumental Music from the North of Ireland. Bloomington: Indiana University Press, 2006. Boyd co-edited and produced the compact disc accompanying the book. ISBN 978-0-253-34717-6 OCLC 65646013
- Boyd, Doug. "Achieving the Promise of Oral History in a Digital Age." Ritchie, Donald A. The Oxford Handbook of Oral History. Oxford: Oxford University Press, 2011. pp. 285–302. ISBN 978-0-195-33955-0 OCLC 827753920
- Boyd, Douglas A. Crawfish Bottom: Recovering a Lost Kentucky Community. Lexington, Ky: University Press of Kentucky, 2011. ISBN 978-0-813-13408-6 OCLC 722842683
- Boyd, Douglas A., and Mary Larson. Oral History and Digital Humanities: Voice, Access, and Engagement. 2014. ISBN 978-1-1373-2202-9 OCLC 900722399
- Klotter, James C., Terry L. Birdwhistell, Douglas A. Boyd. Kentucky Remembered: An Oral History Series. Lexington, Kentucky: University Press of Kentucky. Various titles. OCLC 637503088
