= Terry Jones (businessman) =

Terry Jones is the founder and former CEO of Travelocity, chairman of Kayak.com, CIO of Sabre Inc., and motivational speaker. He has served on boards of Earthlink, Overture Services Corp Entrust, Inc, La Quinta Corporation, Vendare Media Smart Destinations, Boingo, Kenzie Academy, Luxury Link, Rearden Commerce, Switchfly. SonicWall, Crytica Security, Amgine, and was a special venture partner with General Catalyst Partners.

== Background ==
A graduate of Denison University in Granville, Ohio, Jones entered the travel industry in 1971 as a travel agent with Vega Travel in Chicago. He later served as vice president of Travel Advisors for five years, a company specializing in business travel to Eastern Europe and the USSR, with offices in Chicago and Moscow. Jones has served on boards for Earthlink, Overture Services Corp (until sold to Yahoo!), Entrust, Inc, La Quinta Corporation (until sold to Blackstone) and Vendare Media until the board size was reduced.

== Business History ==
In 1978, Jones began his career by joining Agency DataSystems a company selling accounting computers to travel agents. He served there as Vice President Sales and later VP of Product Development. The company was then sold to American Airlines, where Jones began a career at the airline. Jones then served as President Agency DataSystems, Vice President SABRE product development, Vice President Applications Development, President SABRE Computer Services and CIO SABRE Division. While he was serving as CIO of SABRE he assumed responsibility for EAASY SABRE which became Travelocity where he served as CEO till 2002 and took the company public for $1.2 Billion. He left Travelocity when the company was taken private and then was a co-founder of Kayak.com, where he served as chairman for eight years until it was sold to Priceline for $1.8 Billion. In 2014 he co-founded Wayblazer.com, a travel AI company where he served as Chairman till 2018.

== Current Activity ==
Jones lectures worldwide about innovation and building digital relationships in business and holds several patents. He serves on the board of directors of Luxury Link, Rearden Commerce and Smart Destinations. He is chairman of the board of Kayak.com, and is a special venture partner with General Catalyst Partners. Jones is also a consultant, in his company Essential Ideas.

In an April 2021 interview with Kent German, a Senior Managing Editor for CNET, Terry suggests COVID vaccination should not be kept private and likens vaccination status to that of someone having a disability stating, "If someone finds out my vaccination status, I'm not sure that's a bad thing."

== Philanthropy ==
Jones served as chairman of two non profits, The Lake Tahoe Shakespeare Foundation and The Camping and Education Foundation.

== See also ==
- Online travel agency
- Travel technology
- Eric Barbier (entrepreneur)
- Computer reservation system
