= Abramson =

Origin
- Meaning: Son of Abram

Other names
- Variant form: Abrahamson

Abramson is a variation of a patronymic surname, meaning "son of Abram (or Abraham)", the Biblical figure. Surnames like "Abramson" became particularly important in Jewish communities due to the pressures of assimilation and identification. In medieval Europe, Jewish families were often required by authorities to adopt fixed surnames for taxation and census purposes. This was especially true in the Austro-Hungarian Empire during the 18th century under Emperor Joseph II, who mandated the adoption of Germanic surnames by Jewish citizens.

It is most prevalent among American Jews. When Jewish families emigrated to English-speaking countries, especially during the late 19th and early 20th centuries, many adapted their surnames to conform to English spelling and pronunciation norms. "Abramson" became a natural Anglicized form, retaining its original meaning while adapting to English grammar.

People named "Abramson" include:

- Abraham Abramson (1752 or 1754–1811), Prussian coiner
- Adelina Veniaminovna Abramson (1917–2012), Argentine-born Russian translator
- Alexis R. Abramson (fl. 2000s–2020s), American mechanical engineer and dean of the Thayer School of Engineering at Dartmouth College
- Arthur S. Abramson (1925–2017), American linguist and speech scientist
- Arthur von Abramson (1854–?), Imperial Russian civil engineer
- David Abramson (fl. 1970s–2020s), Australian engineer
- Doris E. Abramson (died 2008), American professor, author, editor, and bookstore proprietor
- Edward Abramson (1920–2012), American politician who served in the New York State Assembly
- Frederick B. Abramson (1935–1991), African-American lawyer
- George Abramson (1903–1985), American football player
- Harold Alexander Abramson (1899–1980), American psychiatrist
- H. Norman Abramson (1926–2022), American engineer and scientist
- Henry Abramson (born 1963), dean of the Lander College of Arts and Sciences
- Herb Abramson (1916–1999), American record company executive and producer
- Ivan Abramson (1869–1934), Russian-born American director of silent films active in the 1910s and 1920s
- Jadwiga Abramson (1887–1944), Polish-born French child psychologist
- Jerry Abramson (born 1946), American politician and mayor of Louisville, Kentucky, United States
- Jesse Abramson (1904–1979), American sports writer
- Jill Abramson (born 1954), American journalist and managing editor of The New York Times
- John Abramson (fl. 1970s–2020s), American physician and Harvard Medical School professor
- Josh Abramson (born 1981), co-founder of CollegeHumor
- Kate Abramson (fl. 1990s–2020s), American philosophy professor
- Larry Abramson (born 1954), South African-born Israeli artist
- Lee Abramson (1970–2016), American musician and presidential candidate
- Leon Abramson (1925–1992), was an American jazz drummer
- Leslie Abramson (born c. 1944), American criminal defense attorney
- Leonard Abramson (1932–2026), American businessman and founder of U.S. Healthcare
- Lyn Yvonne Abramson (born 1950), American psychology professor
- Maria Entraigues-Abramson (fl. 2000s–2010s), Argentinian singer
- Marion Abramson (1905–1965), American civic leader
- Mark Abramson (1934–2007), American record producer
- Matanya Abramson (1920–2004), Israeli sculptor
- Max Abramson (born 1976), New Hampshire politician
- Nancy Abramson (fl. 2000s–2020s), first female president of the Cantors Assembly
- Neil Abramson (politician) (born 1967), American politician
- Neil Abramson (filmmaker) (born 1963), American filmmaker
- Norman Abramson (1932–2020), American engineer
- Paul R. Abramson (psychologist) (born 1949), American professor of psychology
- Paul R. Abramson (political scientist) (1937–2018), American political scientist
- Paul Abramson (politician) (1889–1976), Estonian politician
- Phil Abramson (1933–1987), American set decorator
- Rick Abramson (fl. 1960s–2020s), CEO and executive vice president of Delaware North
- Rochelle Abramson (fl. 1970s–2000s), American violinist
- Ronney Abramson (fl. 1970s–1980s), Canadian singer-songwriter
- Seth Abramson (born 1976), American professor, attorney, and author
- Todd Abramson (fl. 1980s–2020s), record label owner, booking agent and nightclub owner
- Traci Hunter Abramson (fl. 1980s–2020s), American mystery and suspense novelist

== See also ==
- Per Abramsen (born 1941), Dutch sculptor
- Joel Abromson (1938–2002), American politician
- Abramzon
