= Richard Plunz =

American architect, critic, and historian

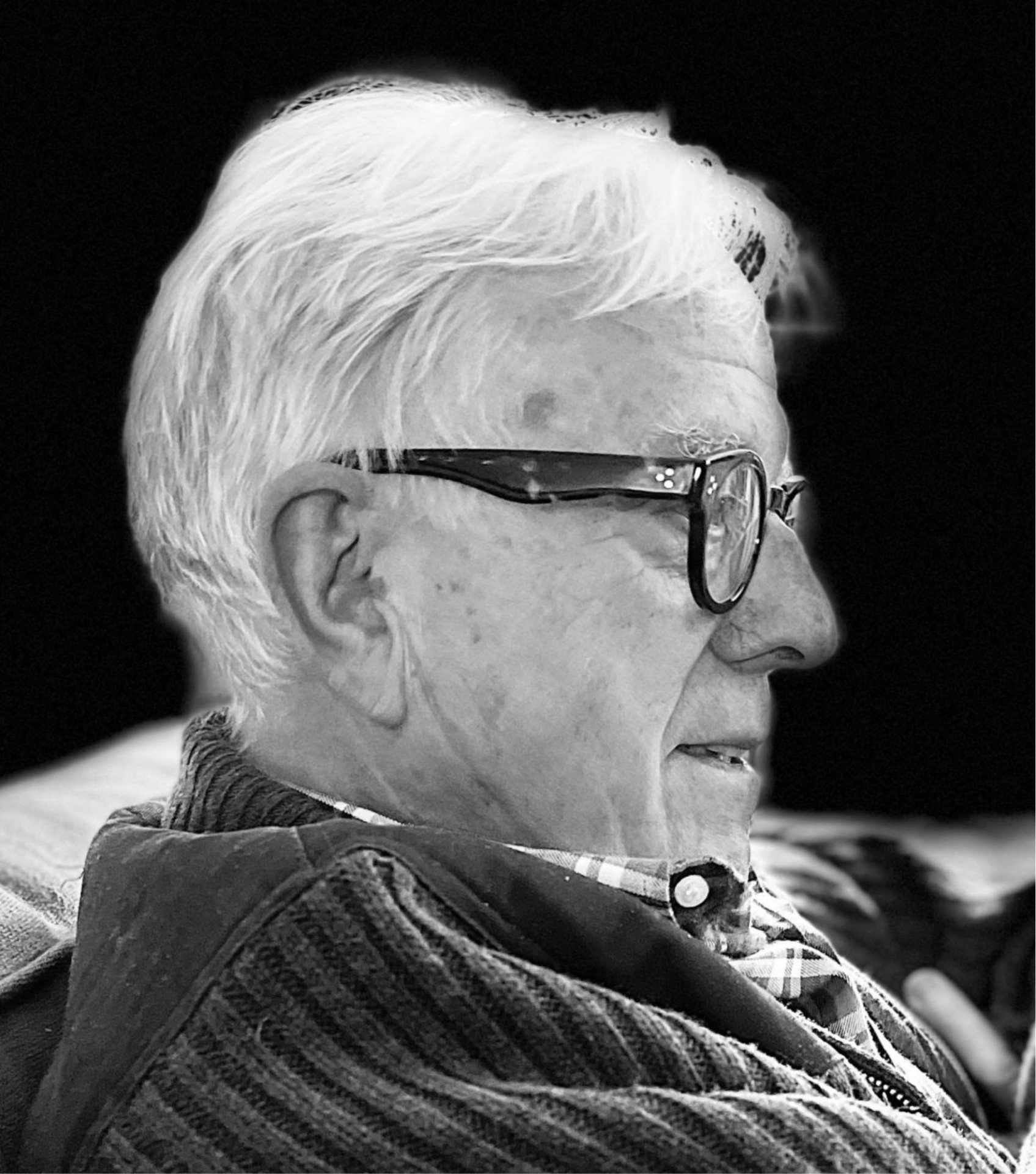
- Education: Rensselaer Polytechnic Institute
- Occupations: Architect; Author professor
- Notable work: A History of Housing in New York City (1990); Two Adirondack Hamlets in History (1999); Turgutreis 1974 (2016); City Riffs. Urbanism, Ecology, Place (2017); New York_Global: Critical Writings and Proposals 1970–2020 (2023)

Richard Plunz is an American architect, critic, and historian. He is professor emeritus of Architecture, Planning and Preservation at the Graduate School of Architecture, Planning and Preservation at Columbia University in the City of New York. He founded and was the director of the Urban Design Lab, a research unit of Columbia's Earth Institute, where he also served as professor.

== Education and career ==
Plunz studied architecture at Rensselaer Polytechnic Institute in Troy, New York, where he earned B.S. in engineering, BArch, and MArch degrees. There, and at Pennsylvania State University, he researched urban history and development and began developing field techniques related to the anthropology of building and people's relationship to the built environment.

He has taught at Columbia since 1973, and served as chair of the Division of Architecture and director of the post-professional Urban Design Program from 1992 to 2015. Plunz has also held visiting professor positions at the Catholic University of Leuven, in Flanders, and Polytechnic University of Turin, in Italy.

== Research and publications ==
Plunz has pursued research related to housing, urban history, anthropology, urban parametrics, and design. During the 1970s, he undertook anthropological field research in a series of major studies using digitized environmental modeling to help understand the divergent urban contexts of Mantua, in West Philadelphia, the frazione of San Leucio in southern Italy, and in the Adirondack High Peaks region in New York.

Other significant work includes a 40-year study in Turgutreis, Turkey, which documented the transformation of small villages into a modern city through the experiences of 15 families, and a Millennium Cities Initiative-developed strategic analysis of Accra, Ghana's Ga Mashie and Nima neighborhoods.

His A History of Housing in New York City tracks the city's housing developments from 1850 and was published in 1992, and republished in 2016 with new research and an introduction by urban historian Kenneth T. Jackson. Urban planner Peter Marcuse wrote of the book in a 1992 review, "For its wealth of information and description, for its humane perspective, and for the illumination it provides on the role of architecture in the shaping of housing in New York City over the decades, this is a most valuable book."

Plunz has published two anthologies of his writing on cities. In 2017 his City Riffs. Urbanism, Ecology, Place represented his experience of twenty-three years as Director of the Columbia University Master of Science in Architecture and Urban Design Program. His New York_Global: Critical Writings and Proposals 1970–2020 published in 2023 is a compilation of writings and projects primarily representing his teaching at Columbia. In his review of the book, the writer John Hill observed that "things that haven’t changed dramatically over this half-century jump to the fore, especially in the context of housing in NYC: housing and economic inequality are still big concerns, and tactics proposed decades ago…are now just seeing fruition."

== Awards ==
Plunz received the Andrew J Thomas Award from the American Institute of Architects for his pioneering work in housing.

== Bibliography ==
- San Leucio. Vitalità d'Una Tradizione. Traditions in Transition. Italian translation. Caserta: Frammenti edizioni, 2023. ISBN 978-88-947675-0-6
- New York_Global: Critical Writings and Proposals 1970–2020. Housing, Infrastructure, Pedagogy. Barcelona: Actar Publishers, 2023. ISBN 978-1-638400-93-6
- City Riffs. Urbanism, Ecology, Place. Zurich: Lars Müller, 2017. ISBN 978-3-03778-500-3
- A History of Housing in New York City. Tokyo: Kajima, 2005; New York: Columbia University Press, 1990, 2016. ISBN 978-0-231-17835-8, 978-0-231-54310-1
- Turgutreis 1974. (co-author with Suha Özkan). Istanbul: Literatür, 2016. ISBN 978-975-04-0706-2
- Urban Climate Change Crossroads (editor with Maria Paola Sutto). New York: UDL, 2008; Surrey: Ashgate, 2010. ISBN 978-1-4094-0078-3, 978-0-7546-9980-4
- Eco-Gowanus: Urban Remediation by Design (editor with Patricia Culligan). Columbia MSAUD New Urbanisms 8. 2007.
- The Urban Life World. Formation Perception Representation (editor with Peter Madsen). London: Routledge, 2002. ISBN 0-415-23177-9
- Two Adirondack Hamlets in History. Keene and Keene Valley (editor). Fleishmanns, New York: Purple Mountain Press, 1999. ISBN 1-930098-04-9
- Habiter New York. La Forme Institutionalisée de l'Habitat New Yorkais, 1850–1950. Liège, Belgium: Pierre Mardaga Editeur, 1982. ISBN 2-87009-172-9
- Design and the Public Good. Selected Writings, 1930–1980 by Serge Chermayeff (editor). Cambridge, Massachusetts: The MIT Press, 1982. ISBN 0-262-16088-9
- Housing Form and Public Policy in the United States (editor). New York: Praeger Publishers, 1980. ISBN 0-03-056839-0
- San Leucio. Vitalità d'Una Tradizione. Traditions in Transition. New York: George Wittenborn and Company, 1973. ISBN 0815006810
- Mantua Primer. Toward a Program for Environmental Change. Baltimore: United States Public Health Service, November, 1970. LCCN 79-606719
