= Raymond Kennedy (novelist) =

American novelist

- Born: March 3, 1934; Wilbraham, Massachusetts, U.S.
- Died: February 18, 2008 (aged 73); New York City, U.S.
- Education: University of Massachusetts Amherst
- Occupations: Novelist, professor
- Writing career
- Period: 1963–2003
- Genre: Literary fiction

Raymond Kennedy (March 3, 1934 – February 18, 2008) was an American novelist.

== Background ==
Raymond Kennedy was born in Wilbraham, Massachusetts to James Patrick Kennedy and Orise Belanger and was the youngest of three brothers. Kennedy spent his formative years in Belchertown and Holyoke. He would later set many of his books in the region.

== Career ==
After serving in the United States Army, Kennedy returned home and, under the G.I. Bill, studied at the University of Massachusetts Amherst, graduating in 1960 with a degree in English. While there, he studied under the poets Ted Hughes and Joseph Langland, as well as writing teachers Bob Tucker and Doris Abramson. Shortly after graduating, Kennedy moved to New York City's Greenwich Village. In the 1960s and 1970s, he worked as a staff editor, first for Collier's Encyclopedia and later for the Encyclopedia Americana. In 1982, he joined the faculty of Columbia University, where he taught creative writing until his retirement in 2006.

== Legacy ==
Kennedy's archives are maintained at Boston University's Howard Gotlieb Archival Research Center and are open to the public.

== Literary works ==
His novels include:

- My Father's Orchard (1963)
- Good Night, Jupiter (1970)
- A Private Station (1972)
- Columbine (1981)
- The Flower of the Republic (1983)
- Lulu Incognito (1988)
- Ride a Cockhorse (1991)
- The Bitterest Age (1994)
- The Romance of Eleanor Gray (2003)
