= Therapy speak =

Misuse of psychology terms

Therapy speak is the incorrect use of terminology which is frequently used in psychotherapy and mental health. It tends to be linguistically prescriptive and formal in tone.

Therapy speak is related to psychobabble and buzzwords. It is vulnerable to miscommunication and relationship damage as a result of the speaker not fully understanding the terms they are using, as well as using the words in a weaponized or abusive manner. Therapy speak is not generally used by therapists during psychotherapy sessions.

== Motivation ==
Although the use of therapy speak may be unintentional, a variety of different motivations have been identified in different situations.

People use therapy speak because it makes them or their emotions sound more important or superior. In this sense, the use of therapy speak may be no different from academese, which is jargon needlessly used by university professors and other academics to make themselves sound educated. This can come across as the speaker being condescending and unkind. Therapy speak may be used in other ways to claim social status, e.g., by engaging in conspicuous consumption under the guise of self-care.

The motivation may be to win an argument, or to prevent people from questioning why they have issued a demand.

Therapy speak is sometimes used by "deeply insecure" people to mask their discomfort, avoid conflict, or to create distance in a relationship. Instead of saying something clear, like "I don't want to be friends any longer", they may use therapy speak and instead say something vague like "I don't have the emotional capacity for a relationship". It may be used as a defence mechanism to put emotional distance between them, their feelings, and the situation. They may be hoping that using therapy speak will elicit more sympathy, or at least tamp down overt criticism. Because it can distance the speaker from culpability for what they say and do, it has been compared to the jargon used in businesses in human resource policies and similarly formal corporate communications to employees.

People also use therapy speak to cover up being controlling. Rather than using the language of psychology to describe oneself, the speaker uses it to judge others.

Another motivation for using therapy speak is to get more support. Some people may find that their needs are more likely to be met when they use therapy speak (e.g., "I was traumatized by the traffic jam this morning") than if they use ordinary language (e.g., "I felt stressed because the traffic made me late").

Among people who are dating, using therapy speak may be an attempt to signal that the speaker is emotionally mature or financially stable. Talking about psychotherapy during a first date may increase the likelihood of a second date.

Employers may use therapy speak as well as psychology-based activities, such educational sessions about burnout and stress management, to address some complaints from employees. This may be considered psychwashing (whitewashing a bad situation through psychology), as it redirects attention away from the problems caused by the company (e.g., poor management, overworked employees, low pay) towards problems with the individual (e.g., feeling stressed because the work is pointless and poorly paid).

== Effects ==
Therapy speak can be associated with controlling behavior. It can be used as a weapon to shame people or to pathologize them by declaring the other person's behavior (e.g., accidentally hurting the other person's feelings) to be a mental illness, as well as a way to excuse or minimize the speaker's choices, for example, by blaming their attachment style on a conscious behavior like ghosting rather than working to change the behavior.

Like other forms of pop psychology, therapy speak can result in miscommunication. When people use the same word to mean different things, they may have difficulty understanding each other. For example, someone might talk about trauma bonding, thinking that it's the emotional bond between survivors of a shared experience; the actual meaning is the emotional attachment of abuse victims to their abusers. Using the word to refer to a relationship between abuse survivors will confuse people who believe it refers to an abuser–victim relationship, and vice versa. In sessions, therapists may address this by asking the speaker to define the word or explain it in more detail. It also impairs communication by substituting a superficial judgement for clear communication.

Therapy speak can prevent the person from clearly and correctly understanding their situation or relationship. Labeling a person or situation with psychology jargon may stop people from exploring any of the nuances or complexities. For example, someone may say that a person is toxic, when it would be more productive to understand how they have been hurt by this person, or even whether they have been hurt. Additionally, it may disempower people and reduce their psychological resilience by causing them to believe that minor or ordinary unpleasant feelings are symptoms of psychological disorders. This can make managing the situation seem more difficult and can produce an identity around being mentally ill.

Mislabeling a situation (e.g., calling it trauma, when the person is experiencing grief, feeling overwhelmed, being upset, or experiencing a stress response) may prevent the person from finding effective coping mechanisms. The lack of nuance, and its tendency towards glibness, may make it harder for the speaker to authentically interrogate and understand their own responses.

According to psychotherapist Esther Perel, "[in therapy speech], there is such an emphasis on the 'self-care' aspect of it that is actually making us more isolated and more alone, because the focus is just on the self". Many therapists find that using therapy speak can prevent people from being open and vulnerable with each other. It may be used in an attempt to define the other person's lived experiences. It is frequently used in ways that elevate a one-sided view of a relationship or situation.

When used to exaggerate – to describe an everyday harm as more serious trauma, conflating a normal level of tidiness with obsessive–compulsive disorder, mislabeling conflict as abuse – therapy speak can harm people who have serious mental conditions by taking away the language used to describe their more extreme situations. However, therapy speak also has the effect of normalizing and de-stigmatizing mental health problems.

Therapy speak is often used to confess failings.

Misuse of specific words may have specific effects. For example, overuse of trauma can make people with post-traumatic stress disorder feel like their life and identity is centered around their trauma. Using narcissism to complain about ordinary self-interest or inconsiderateness can harm communication and discourage other people from seeking fair arrangements, for fear that asking for fairness will be called narcissistic behavior. Saying "I was triggered" can minimize the interior experience of fear or anger.

More generally, when the jargon of psychology becomes commonplace, the words may lose their meanings, through a process called semantic bleaching.

== History ==
The phenomenon of jargon from psychology appearing in everyday language predates even Sigmund Freud, who popularized concepts such as repression and denial more than a century ago. The act of claiming that another person is mentally ill without much evidence, or being an "armchair psychologist", is also not a new social or relationship phenomenon.

The popularity of therapy speak correlates with the decline of institutionalized religion, which provides opportunities to make sense of difficult experiences, and the increased use of mental health services, especially during the COVID-19 pandemic. For example, the word triggered has become more popular since the mid-20th century. It became trendy on social media platforms during the 2010s, and can be found in dating apps. Therapy speak is also connected to the rise of therapy culture, which is a belief that everyone benefits from undergoing psychotherapy and that psychotherapy can solve people's problems.

The trend towards using therapy speak online may be due to loss of nuance and the sound bite nature of social media. A brief, impersonal example of how to break off a friendship might be misinterpreted on social media as a correct, humane, and empathetic way to treat other people. However, therapy speak has also been used in academic publications.

== Related therapeutic problems ==
In addition to the jargon of psychology appearing in everyday speech, there are related problems, such as expecting everyone to behave like a therapist. This can manifest in the form of expecting emotional validation (a therapeutic technique) from everyone, which, when accepted within a larger group, can slide into overvaluing people's emotional experiences.

== Examples ==
Some words encountered in psychotherapy are commonly misused.

Trauma
Many psychotherapists consider the term "trauma" to be overused to describe "anything bad". According to George Bonanno, psychological trauma is often defined to begin with a horrific "violent or life-threatening event that is outside the range of normal experience", such as rape, a natural disaster, or a mass shooting. Early symptoms may include shock and denial; later symptoms, for those who develop post-traumatic stress disorder, may include unpredictable labile mood (e.g., a normal comment provokes an obviously abnormal feeling), intense nightmares or flashbacks (feeling like the traumatic event is happening again), and other debilitating symptoms. However, other clinicians argue that another form of trauma isn't yet included in the Diagnostic and Statistical Manual of Mental Disorders (DSM), caused by experiences that may not be explicitly violent, but still mirror the effects of more "severe" trauma and affects people deeply.
Trigger
The term "trigger" is often used to say that the person is upset, or that a behavior caused the person to feel bad. However, a trauma trigger in clinical terms describes something that may be harmless (e.g., the sound of a motorcycle) that is mentally tied for that individual to a previous terrible event (e.g., witnessing gun violence).
Gaslighting
Declared to be the 2022 word of the year by Merriam-Webster, gaslighting is often used to describe ordinary disagreement or lying and the behavior of people who refuse to believe that they have caused any harm. In its original meaning, gaslighting, which is also called coercive control, is used to describe a form of long-term psychological manipulation and emotional abuse by a close, trusted person (such as a romantic partner, family member, or close friend), that increases the abuser's power and control by making the other person doubt their perception of reality.
Narcissism
The word "narcissism", increasingly used in common speech to imply narcissistic personality disorder, may be used casually to imply that people with ordinary or individual acts of self-centeredness, selfishness, rudeness, or self-importance have a serious disorder. However, narcissistic personality disorder is actually a pattern of long-term behavior that takes self-involvement to an unhealthy extreme, involving an unrealistic sense of superiority (grandiosity), the need for others to admire them, and a lack of empathy.
Depressed
This word is often used to describe many unpleasant experiences, including temporary sadness, experiencing disappointment, and feeling discouraged. However, clinical depression is an extreme level of sadness and hopelessness that lasts for weeks (or longer) and that interferes with activities of daily life (such as eating, sleeping, and maintaining basic hygiene standards).
Boundaries
"Setting a boundary" is often misused to mean creating a family estrangement if the speaker's wishes are not fulfilled by others, but in psychotherapy, a boundary is carefully considered choice that is meant to preserve relationships. A boundary describes the actions taken by the person who set the boundary. For example, a person might decide that if someone asks about a painful situation, they will say "I don't feel like talking about that right now", and then repeat that statement as many times as necessary. Rather than hiding from other people or trying to control what others do, a healthy boundary supports interaction and takes the other person's needs into account.
Codependency
"Codependency" may be sometimes used to say that the speaker believes that a person is too invested in a relationship; however, codependency is instead an unhealthy relationship that enables destructive behavior.
Self-care
Meant to refer to ordinary care for the body, such as by getting enough sleep, it is often used to mean pampering, such as through an expensive day at a spa.

== See also ==
- Curse of knowledge – using technical jargon correctly, but not being understood because the audience does not know the same jargon
