= Gaslighting =

Type of psychological manipulation

Google Trends topic searches for "Gaslighting" began a substantial increase in 2016.

Gaslighting is the manipulation of someone into questioning their perception of reality. The term derives from the 1944 film Gaslight and became popular in the mid-2010s.

Some mental health experts have expressed concern that the term has been used too broadly. In 2022, The Washington Post described it as an example of therapy speak, arguing it had become a buzzword improperly used to describe ordinary disagreements.

== Etymology ==
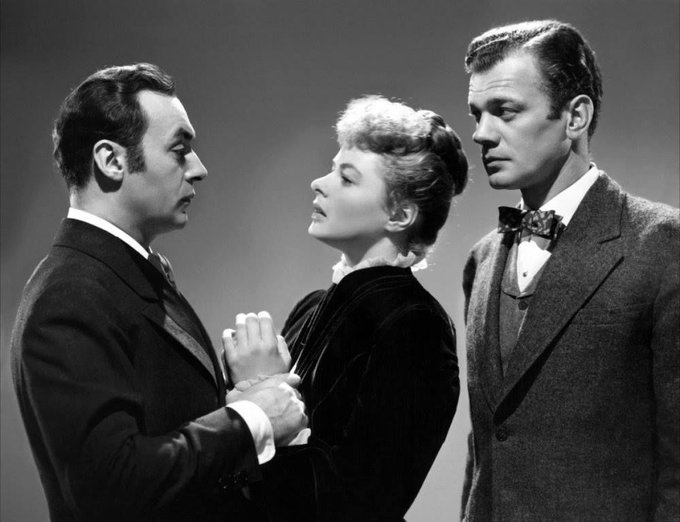
Charles Boyer, Ingrid Bergman, and Joseph Cotten in the 1944 American film version of Gaslight

The term derives from the title of the 1944 film Gaslight. The film was based on the 1938 British play Gas Light by Patrick Hamilton and was a remake of the 1940 British film adaptation, Gaslight. Set among London's elite during the Victorian era, Gas Light and its adaptations portray a seemingly genteel husband using lies and manipulation to isolate his heiress wife and persuade her that she is mentally ill so that he can steal from her. The wife is perturbed when the gaslights in the house periodically dim, as they normally would if a lamp were lit elsewhere in the house, causing the gas pressure to drop; when she asks the servants, they tell her that nobody else is in the house. Unknown to all of them is that the husband is upstairs searching the rooms for jewels.

The gerund form gaslighting does not appear in the play or films. Its earliest recorded use was in 1961. In The New York Times, it was first used in a 1995 column by Maureen Dowd. According to the American Psychological Association in 2021, gaslighting "once referred to manipulation so extreme as to induce mental illness or to justify commitment of the gaslighted person to a psychiatric institution". It remained obscure — The New York Times used it only nine times in the following 20 years — until the 2010s, when it seeped into the English lexicon. Merriam-Webster defines gaslighting as "psychological manipulation" to make someone question their "perception of reality" leading to "dependence on the perpetrator". The American Dialect Society named gaslight the most useful new word of 2016. Oxford University Press named it a runner-up in its list of the most popular new words of 2018.

== In self-help and amateur psychology ==
Gaslighting is a term used in self-help and amateur psychology to describe a dynamic that can occur in personal relationships (romantic or parental) and in workplace relationships. Gaslighting involves two parties: the "gaslighter", who persistently puts forth a false narrative in order to manipulate, and the "gaslighted", who struggles to maintain their individual autonomy. Gaslighting is typically effective only when there is an unequal power dynamic or when the gaslighted has shown respect to the gaslighter.

Gaslighting is different from genuine relationship disagreement, which is both common and important in relationships. Gaslighting is distinct in that:

- one partner is consistently listening and considering the other partner's perspective;
- one partner is consistently negating the other's perception, insisting that they are wrong, or telling them that their emotional reaction is irrational or dysfunctional.

The term gaslighting is more often used to refer to a pattern of behavior over a long duration, not a one-off instance of persuasion, but the method(s) of persuasion is the defining trait of gaslighting behavior. Over time, the listening partner may exhibit symptoms often associated with anxiety disorders, depression, or low self-esteem. Gaslighting is distinct from genuine relationship conflict in that one party manipulates the perceptions of the other.

=== Broader use and conflation ===
In 2022, Merriam-Webster named "gaslighting" its Word of the Year due to the vast increase in channels and technologies used to mislead and the word becoming common for the perception of deception. The word is often used incorrectly to refer to conflicts and disagreements. According to Robin Stern, PhD, co-founder of the Yale Center for Emotional Intelligence, "Gaslighting is often used in an accusatory way when somebody may just be insistent on something, or somebody may be trying to influence you. That's not what gaslighting is."

Some mental health experts have expressed concern that the broader use of the term is diluting its usefulness and may make it more difficult to identify the specific type of abuse described in the original definition. According to a 2022 Washington Post report, it had become a "trendy buzzword" frequently improperly used to describe ordinary disagreements, rather than those situations that align with the word's historical definition.

== In psychiatry and psychology ==
The word gaslighting is occasionally used in clinical literature, but is considered a colloquialism by the American Psychological Association. Barton and Whitehead described three case reports of gaslighting with the goal of securing a person's involuntary commitment to a psychiatric hospital, motivated by a desire to get rid of relatives or obtain financial gain: a wife attempting to frame her husband as violent so she could elope with her lover, another wife alleging that her pub-owning husband was an alcoholic in order to leave him and take control of the pub, and a retirement home manager who gave laxatives to a resident before referring her to a psychiatric hospital for dementia and incontinence.

In 1977, at a time when published literature on gaslighting was still sparse, Lund and Gardiner published a case report on an elderly woman who was repeatedly involuntarily committed for alleged psychosis, by staffers of her retirement home, but whose symptoms always disappeared shortly after admittance without any treatment. After investigation, it was discovered that her 'paranoia' had been the result of gaslighting by staffers of the retirement home, who knew the woman had suffered from paranoid psychosis 15 years prior.

The research paper "Gaslighting: A Marital Syndrome" includes clinical observations of the impact on wives after their reactions were mislabeled by their husbands and male therapists. Other experts have noted values and techniques of therapists can be harmful as well as helpful to clients (or indirectly to other people in a client's life).

In his 1996 book, Gaslighting, the Double Whammy, Interrogation and Other Methods of Covert Control in Psychotherapy and Analysis, Theo L. Dorpat recommends non-directive and egalitarian attitudes and methods on the part of clinicians, and "treating patients as active collaborators and equal partners". He writes, "Therapists may contribute to the victim's distress through mislabeling the [victim's] reactions.... The gaslighting behaviors of the spouse provide a recipe for the so-called 'nervous breakdown' for some [victims, and] suicide in some of the worst situations." Dorpat also cautions clinicians about the unintentional abuse of patients when using interrogation and other methods of covert control in Psychotherapy and Analysis, as these methods can subtly coerce patients rather than respect and genuinely help them.

=== Motivations ===
Gaslighting is a way to control the moment, stop conflict, ease anxiety, and feel in control. It often deflects responsibility however and tears down the other person. Some may gaslight their partners by denying events, including personal violence. A study found that those who gaslight tended to score high on manipulative personality traits.

=== Learned behavior ===
Gaslighting is a learned trait. A gaslighter is a student of social learning. They witness it, experience it themselves, or stumble upon it, and see that it works, both for self-regulation and coregulation. Studies have shown that gaslighting is more prevalent in couples where one or both partners have maladaptive personality traits (such as traits associated with short-term mental illness like depression), substance-induced illness (e.g., alcoholism), mood disorders (e.g., bipolar disorder), anxiety disorders (e.g., PTSD), personality disorder (e.g., BPD, NPD, etc.), neurodevelopmental disorder (e.g., ADHD), or combination of the above (i.e., co-occurrence) and are prone to and adept at convincing others to doubt their own perceptions.

=== Habilitation ===
It can be difficult to extricate oneself from a gaslighting power dynamic:

- Those who gaslight must attain greater emotional awareness and self-regulation, or;
- Those being gaslighted must learn that they do not need others to validate their reality, and they need to gain self-reliance and confidence in defining their own reality.

== In medicine ==
Medical gaslighting is an informal term that refers to patients having their real symptoms dismissed or downplayed by medical professionals, leading to incorrect or delayed diagnoses; women are more likely to be affected by the phenomenon.

== In politics ==
Gaslighting is more likely to be effective when the gaslighter has a position of power.

In the 2008 book State of Confusion: Political Manipulation and the Assault on the American Mind, the authors contend that the prevalence of gaslighting in American politics began with the age of modern communications:

To say gaslighting was started by... any extant group is not simply wrong, it also misses an important point. Gaslighting comes directly from blending modern communications, marketing, and advertising techniques with long-standing methods of propaganda. They were simply waiting to be discovered by those with sufficient ambition and psychological makeup to use them.

The term has been used to describe the behavior of politicians and media personalities on both the left and the right sides of the political spectrum. Some examples include:

- American journalists have used the word "gaslighting" to describe the actions of Donald Trump during the 2016 US presidential election and during both of his terms as president.
- In 2025, Jake Tapper of CNN asked Minnesota Governor Tim Walz if Democrats had engaged in gaslighting during the 2024 US presidential election.
- "Gaslighting" has been used to describe state-implemented psychological harassment techniques used in East Germany during the 1970s and 1980s. The techniques were used as part of the Stasi's (the state security service's) decomposition methods, which were designed to paralyze the ability of hostile-negative (politically incorrect or rebellious) people to operate without unjustifiably imprisoning them, which would have resulted in international condemnation.

== In social systems ==
Gaslighting within social systems operates as a mechanism to uphold entrenched power hierarchies, often through subtle and overt forms of manipulation that compel individuals to question their perceptions of reality. One striking manifestation is racial gaslighting, a process deeply embedded within the political, economic, social, and cultural scaffolding of a dominant racial hierarchy. By pathologizing dissent and framing challenges to racial inequities as misperceptions or even assaults on democratic fairness, racial gaslighting coerces marginalized individuals into doubting their experiences within racialized structures. This phenomenon extends beyond denial of systemic racism to active recharacterization, where the assertion of racial injustice is reframed as an act of reverse discrimination or irrational sensitivity.

== In the workplace ==
In her 2024 book On Gaslighting, Indiana University philosopher Kate Abramson offers the example of a boss who minimizes a complaint of harassment or discrimination, possibly filed by a member of a marginalized group. In her framing, the gaslighter says "Don’t be so sensitive. You’re overreacting. You’re imagining things".

== See also ==
- Big lie: gross distortion or misrepresentation of the truth being presented as a fact
- Confidence trick: using trust to defraud
- DARVO: acronym for "deny, attack, and reverse victim and offender"
- Deception: intentionally using false statements to mislead
- Experiment Perilous (1944 film) – 1944 film by Jacques Tourneur
- Manipulation: exploiting for personal gain
- Martha Mitchell effect: labeling real experiences as delusional
