= Kristina Douglass =

American archeologist

- Education: Yale University, Dartmouth College, Phillips Academy Andover
- Awards: MacArthur Fellow, 2021 Carnegie Fellow
- Scientific career
- Fields: Archaeology
- Workplaces: Columbia Climate School, Pennsylvania State University
- Thesis: An Archaeological Investigation of Settlement and Resource Exploitation Patterns in the Velondriake Marine Protected Area, Southwest Madagascar, ca. 900 BC to AD 1900 (2016)
- Doctoral advisor: Roderick J. McIntosh

Kristina Guild Douglass is an American archaeologist and interdisciplinary climate scholar whose research examines long-term interactions between human societies and their environments, with particular attention to climate variability, social memory, and adaptation. Her work integrates archaeology, paleoecology, and anthropology and emphasizes community-centered and collaborative research approaches, especially in Madagascar and the western Indian Ocean region. In 2025, she was awarded a MacArthur Fellows award for "investigating how past human societies and environments co-evolved and adapted to climate variability." She was awarded a Carnegie Fellowship in 2021 for her work in community-centered archaeology.

== Life ==
As a child, Douglass moved all over the world living in Togo, Kenya, Cameroon, and Ukraine, and spent several years in Madagascar. She attended Phillips Andover and completed an undergraduate degree at Dartmouth College. She went on to graduate work at Yale University, doing her Ph.D. field work in Madagascar. She taught at Pennsylvania State University, and in 2022, joined Columbia Climate School, the first graduate school in the USA focused on climate change, as its inaugural faculty member. Douglass' work investigates how people pass on knowledge over time.

I've always felt that humans are unique in our ability to share information and transmit that information over many generations. It's what has helped our species evolve to occupy any habitat on the planet.

— Kristina G. Douglass, "Kristina G. Douglass to Join Columbia Climate School as First Faculty Hire", The Spirit (2022)

== Works ==
- Douglass, Kristina; Cooper, Jago (2020-04-14). "Archaeology, environmental justice, and climate change on islands of the Caribbean and southwestern Indian Ocean" (PDF). Proceedings of the National Academy of Sciences. 117 (15): 8254–8262. doi:10.1073/pnas.1914211117. ISSN 0027-8424. PMC 7165433. PMID 32284400.
- Douglass, Kristina; Hixon, Sean; Wright, Henry T.; Godfrey, Laurie R.; Crowley, Brooke E.; Manjakahery, Barthélémy; Rasolondrainy, Tanambelo; Crossland, Zoë; Radimilahy, Chantal (2019). "A critical review of radiocarbon dates clarifies the human settlement of Madagascar". Quaternary Science Reviews. 221 105878. doi:10.1016/j.quascirev.2019.105878.
