= Medical journal =

Peer-reviewed scientific journal

Scientific publications per million

A medical journal is a peer-reviewed scientific journal that communicates medical information to physicians and other health professionals. Journals that cover many medical specialties are sometimes called general medical journals.

== History ==
The first medical journals were general medical journals. The first English-language general medical journal was Medicina Curiosa, established in 1684, but it ceased publication after only two issues. The first medical journal to be published in the United Kingdom was Medical Essays and Observations, established in 1731 and published in Edinburgh; the first to be published in the United States was The Medical Repository, established in 1797.

Among the oldest general medical journals that are still in publication today are The Lancet, established in 1823, and the New England Journal of Medicine, established in 1812. Specialty-specific medical journals were first introduced in the early 20th century.

In 1999, Medscape launched Medscape General Medicine, which became the world's first online-only general medical journal.

== General medical journals ==
Journals that are recognized as general medical journals include The Lancet, the New England Journal of Medicine, and the Annals of Internal Medicine. In 2009, the three highest-ranked general medical journals by impact factor were JAMA, The Lancet, and the New England Journal of Medicine. The BMJ's web editor, Tony Delamothe, has described the BMJ as a general medical journal. The Medical Journal of Australia is the only general medical journal in Australia, and the Canadian Medical Association Journal has been called the leading general medical journal in Canada.

== Criticisms ==
Richard Smith, the former editor of the medical journal the BMJ, has been critical of many of the aspects of modern-day medical journal publishing. Critics of medical publishing have argued that problems related to gaming of citation and authorship are prevalent in the field, as many authors did not actually contribute to the articles that their names are on, many contributors to the articles are excluded from authorship, and strategic and unnecessary citations are prevalent to boost scores.

Physicians John Abramson and Richard Smith have argued that because a significant share of medical journals' revenue comes from selling reprints of pharmaceutical drug studies as marketing materials, the journals face a conflict of interest to accept submissions that exaggerate or misstate the efficacy of new medications. For example, in 2005, 41% of The Lancet's income came from reprint sales.

== See also ==
- Academic journal
- List of medical journals
