= Urban Design Lab =

- Established: 2005
- Location: Columbia University’s Earth Institute in New York City

The Urban Design Lab (UDL) is an interdisciplinary research unit of Columbia University’s Earth Institute in New York City. Established in 2005, it advances design-based solutions to issues in sustainable development and global urbanization. Richard Plunz, founder of the UDL, currently directs the program.

The UDL brings together academics and professionals in urban design, planning, architecture, business, real estate, climatology, ecology, engineering, humanities, social sciences, and law. It often works with several departments within Columbia University and the Earth Institute. Its external partners include: the Doris Duke Charitable Foundation, the Ford Foundation, the National Science Foundation, the Rockefeller Brothers Fund, the Samsung Group, the United Health Foundation, the United Nations Environment Assembly, the U.S. Department of Agriculture, and others.

== Projects ==
Since its founding, the Urban Design Lab has produced several pioneering studies with lasting impacts. The UDL regularly presents its research at major international conferences and publishes reports to better inform the public on pressing urban issues, as well as to promote greater political participation.

In 2006, the UDL’s research on the Gowanus Canal’s remediation contributed to the Environmental Protection Agency’s designation of the area as a Superfund site, as well as the subsequent creative renewal of the neighborhood. The EPA began the cleanup of the Superfund site on January 29, 2020.

The UDL has examined climate change in relation to urbanism since its founding. In 2008, they published a landmark report that raised the urgency of multi-disciplinary research on urban mitigation and adaptation in response to climate change. Leaders in climatology contributed to the volume, such as Cynthia E. Rosenzweig.

The UDL has conducted a series of innovative studies combining Twitter data and mapping techniques. Its research examines urban sentiment in public space and explores possible uses of social media data for future urban planning and design projects.

The focus of most projects at the UDL is on green and sustainable infrastructure, coastal cities resiliency, food and the urban environment, and climate change and adaptation. It offers academic research opportunities through comprehensive design studios, such as the Urban Ecology Studio, and more focused research seminars.

== Local engagement ==
The Urban Design Lab leads diverse public initiatives and prioritizes collaboration with underserved local communities. The UDL has worked with New York residents on several projects covering: environmental remediation, high-performance and green building design, micro-infrastructure, public health, and sustainable urban development.

In 2012, the UDL and Columbia’s School of Professional Studies launched a pilot summer program for high school students to explore advanced urban design in studio settings. Recent cohorts have partnered with the 125th Street Business Improvement District in Harlem, focusing on community perspectives on “smart street” innovations.

With the support of the National Science Foundation, the UDL collaborated with the City of New Rochelle on plans for various development initiatives in the area’s downtown and waterfront, as well as around its transit centers.
