= Jacqueline Klopp =

Scholar

Jacqueline M Klopp
- Occupation: Research Scholar

Academic background
- Education: Harvard University (BA, 1988); McGill University (PhD, 2001)

Jacqueline M. Klopp is a researcher scholar and author at Columbia University. Klopp is the director of the Center for Sustainable Urban Development at the Columbia Climate School.

Klopp is a founding member of the DigitalMatatus consortium which began as a project at Columbia University supported by the Rockefeller Foundation. It was one of the first attempts to map and put into standardized format data on an "informal" or popular transportation system.

Klopp also coined the term "popular transport" to reflect the fact that these systems are built bottom up by people to serve everyday people and are dominant in large parts of the Global South. This was also a way to help to counter stigmas and neglect associated with these modes of transport when they are considered "informal". The term has since caught on and is in the name of the Global Network for Popular Transportation.

== Education ==
Klopp earned a Bachelor of Arts in physics from Harvard College in 1988 and Doctor of Philosophy in political science from McGill University in 2001.

== Publications ==
=== Selected articles ===
- Klopp, Jacqueline M., and Danielle L. Petretta. “The Urban Sustainable Development Goal: Indicators, Complexity and the Politics of Measuring Cities.” Cities, vol. 63, Mar. 2017, pp. 92–97. https://doi.org/10.1016/j.cities.2016.12.019.
