= Educational neuroscience =

Scientific field which is multidisciplinary

Educational neuroscience (or neuroeducation, a component of Mind Brain and Education) is a controversial field that brings together researchers in cognitive neuroscience, developmental cognitive neuroscience, educational psychology, educational technology, education theory and other related disciplines to explore the interactions between biological processes and education. Researchers in this area may link basic findings in cognitive neuroscience with educational technology to help in curriculum implementation for mathematics education and reading education.

Researchers in educational neuroscience investigate the neural mechanisms of reading, numerical cognition, attention and their attendant difficulties including dyslexia, dyscalculia and ADHD as they relate to education.

The aim of educational neuroscience is to generate basic and applied research that will provide a new transdisciplinary account of learning and teaching, which is capable of informing education. A major goal of educational neuroscience is to bridge the gap between the two fields through a direct dialogue between researchers and educators, avoiding the "middlemen of the brain-based learning industry". These middlemen have a vested commercial interest in the selling of "neuromyths" and their supposed remedies.

== Early history of the field ==
Scholars, such as Herbert Walberg and Geneva Haertel, trace the beginning of Educational neuroscience to the era between 1800 and 1850 when the scientific study of sense organs began to make advancements. It was during this time that Galen's dictum, which held that the mind was located in the brain, gained acceptance. The study of reflex action during this era triggered a debate over conscious and unconscious states. Mental chronometry that studied the processing speed or reaction time of the brain also began during this period, and was used to infer questions about temporal sequencing of mental operations. By the late 1800s all these developments were categorized as the "new psychology."

An early milestone for the development of Educational neuroscience was the offering of a course in Educational Psychology in 1839 at the University of Nebraska. By 1886 similar courses were offered at the State University of New York at Oswego, the Normal School Department of University of Iowa and the Department of Pedagogy at Indiana University. In 1895 the University of Nebraska went on to found a professorship of educational psychology. By the 1900s disputes among schools of education grew over the content of undergraduate educational psychology courses. (Disagreement between professionals about the definition of Educational neuroscience, has always been part of the field and continues to this day.) Despite arguments about how the field should be defined, there is widespread agreement that American psychologists William James, Edward Thorndike, and James McKeen Cattell are important figures in its advancement in the early decades of the 1900s. Another milestone for the field of Educational neuroscience was the publication in 1910 of the first issue of the Journal of Educational Psychology. Since then, philosophical and scientific movements (such as cognitive theory) have influenced the development of the field. As the field has matured it has played a part in shaping policy during periods of educational reform.

== The need for a new discipline ==
The emergence of educational neuroscience has been born out of the need for a new discipline that makes scientific research practically applicable in an educational context. Addressing the broader field of "mind, brain and education", Kurt Fischer states, "The traditional model will not work. It is not enough for researchers to collect data in schools and make those data and the resulting research papers available to educators", as this method excludes teachers and learners from contributing to the formation of appropriate research methods and questions.

Learning in cognitive psychology and neuroscience has focused on how individual humans and other species have evolved to extract useful information from the natural and social worlds around them. By contrast, education, and especially modern formal education, focuses on descriptions and explanations of the world that learners cannot be expected to acquire by themselves. In this way, learning in the scientific sense, and learning in the educational sense can be seen as complementary concepts. This creates a new challenge for cognitive neuroscience to adapt to the real world practical requirements of educational learning. Conversely, neuroscience creates a new challenge for education, because it provides new characterizations of the current state of the learner—including brain state, genetic state, and hormonal state—that could be relevant to learning and teaching. By providing new measures of the effects of learning and teaching, including brain structure and activity, it is possible to discriminate different types of learning method and attainment. For example, neuroscience research can already distinguish learning by rote from learning through conceptual understanding in mathematics.

The United States National Academy of Sciences published an important report, stressing that, "Neuroscience has advanced to the point where it is time to think critically about the form in which research information is made available to educators so that it is interpreted appropriately for practice—identifying which research findings are ready for implementation and which are not."

In their book The Learning Brain, researchers from London's "Centre for Educational Neuroscience", Blakemore & Frith outline the developmental neurophysiology of the human brain that has given rise to many theories regarding educational neuroscience. One of the fundamental pillars supporting the link between education and neuroscience is the ability of the brain to learn. Neuroscience is developing and increasing our understanding of early brain development, and how these brain changes might relate to learning processes.

== Reception ==
The potential of educational neuroscience has received varying degrees of support from both cognitive neuroscientists and educators. Davis argues that medical models of cognition, "...have only a very limited role in the broader field of education and learning mainly because learning-related intentional states are not internal to individuals in a way which can be examined by brain activity". Pettito and Dunbar on the other hand, suggest that educational neuroscience "provides the most relevant level of analysis for resolving today's core problems in education". Howard-Jones and Pickering surveyed the opinions of teachers and educators on the topic, and found that they were generally enthusiastic about the use of neuroscientific findings in the field of education, and that they felt these findings would be more likely to influence their teaching methodology than curriculum content. Some researchers take an intermediate view and feel that a direct link from neuroscience to education is a "bridge too far", but that a bridging discipline, such as cognitive psychology or educational psychology can provide a neuroscientific basis for educational practice. The prevailing opinion, however, appears to be that the link between education and neuroscience has yet to realise its full potential, and whether through a third research discipline, or through the development of new neuroscience research paradigms and projects, the time is right to apply neuroscientific research findings to education in a practically meaningful way.

== Early brain development ==
Almost all of the neurons in the brain are generated before birth, during the first three months of pregnancy, and the newborn child's brain has a similar number of neurons to that of an adult. Many more neurons form than are needed, and only those that form active connections with other neurons survive. In the first year after birth the infant brain undergoes an intense phase of development, during which excessive numbers of connections between neurons are formed, and many of these excess connections must be cut back through the process of synaptic pruning that follows. This pruning process is just as important a stage of development as the early rapid growth of connections between brain cells. The process during which large numbers of connections between neurons are formed is called synaptogenesis. For vision and hearing (visual and auditory cortex), there is extensive early synaptogenesis. The density of connections peaks at around 150% of adult levels between four and 12 months, and the connections are then extensively pruned. Synaptic density returns to adult levels between two and four years in the visual cortex. For other areas such as prefrontal cortex (thought to underpin planning and reasoning), density increases more slowly and peaks after the first year. Reduction to adult levels of density takes at least another 10–20 years; hence there is significant brain development in the frontal areas even in adolescence. Brain metabolism (glucose uptake, which is an approximate index of synaptic functioning) is also above adult levels in the early years. Glucose uptake peaks at about 150% of adult levels somewhere around four to five years. By the age of around ten years, brain metabolism has reduced to adult levels for most cortical regions. Brain development consists of bursts of synaptogenesis, peaks of density, and then synapse rearrangement and stabilisation. This occurs at different times and different rates for different brain regions, which implies that there may be different sensitive periods for the development of different types of knowledge. Neuroscience research into early brain development has informed government education policy for children under three years old in many countries including the US and the United Kingdom. These policies have focused on enriching the environment of children during nursery and preschool years, exposing them to stimuli and experiences thought to maximise the learning potential of the young brain.

== Can neuroscience inform education? ==
Although an increasing number of researchers are seeking to establish educational neuroscience as a productive field of research, debate still continues with regard to the potential for practical collaboration between the fields of neuroscience and education, and whether neuroscientific research really has anything to offer educators.

Daniel Willingham states that "whether neuroscience can be informative to educational theory and practice is not debatable-it has been." He draws attention to the fact that behavioural research alone was not decisive in determining whether developmental dyslexia was a disorder of primarily visual or phonological origin. Neuroimaging research was able to reveal reduced activation for children with dyslexia in brain regions known to support phonological processing, thus supporting behavioural evidence for the phonological theory of dyslexia.

While John Bruer suggests that the link between neuroscience and education is essentially impossible without a third field of research to link the two, other researchers feel that this view is too pessimistic. While acknowledging that more bridges must be built between basic neuroscience and education, and that so called neuromyths (see below) must be deconstructed, Usha Goswami suggests that cognitive developmental neuroscience has already made several discoveries of use to education, and has also led to the discovery of 'neural markers' that can be used to assess development. In other words, milestones of neural activity or structure are being established, against which an individual can be compared in order to assess their development.

For example, event-related potential (ERP) research has uncovered several neural signatures of language processing, including markers of semantic processing (e.g. N400), phonetic processing (e.g. mismatch negativity) and syntactic processing (e.g. P600). Goswami points out that these parameters can now be investigated longitudinally in children, and that certain patterns of change may indicate certain developmental disorders. Furthermore, the response of these neural markers to focused educational interventions may be used as a measure of the intervention's effectiveness. Researchers such as Goswami assert that cognitive neuroscience has the potential to offer various exciting possibilities to education. For special education, these include the early diagnosis of special educational needs; the monitoring and comparison of the effects of different kinds of educational input on learning; and an increased understanding of individual differences in learning and the best ways to suit input to learner.

A potential application of neuroimaging highlighted by Goswami is in differentiating between delayed development and atypical development in learning disorders. For instance, is a given child with dyslexia developing reading functions in a totally different way from typical readers, or is he/she developing along the same trajectory, but just taking longer to do so? Indeed, evidence already exists to suggest that in children with specific language impairments and dyslexia the development of the language system is delayed rather than fundamentally different in nature. In disorders such as autism however, brain development may be qualitatively different, showing a lack of development in brain regions associated with a "theory of mind".

Goswami also suggests that neuroimaging could be used to assess the impact of particular training programmes, such as the Dore, an exercise based programme based on the cerebellar deficit hypothesis that aims to improve reading through a series of balance exercises. Some brain imaging research is beginning to show that for children with dyslexia who receive targeted educational interventions, their brain activation patterns begin to look more like those of people without reading disorders, and in addition, that other brain regions are acting as compensatory mechanisms. Such findings may help educators understand that, even if dyslexic children show behavioural improvement, the neural and cognitive mechanisms by which they process written information may still be different, and this may have practical implications for the ongoing instruction of these children.

Neuroscience research has evidenced its ability to reveal 'neural markers' of learning disorders, most notably in the case of dyslexia. EEG studies have revealed that human infants at risk of dyslexia (i.e. with immediate family members with dyslexia) show atypical neural responses to changes in speech sounds, even before they are able to understand the semantic content of language. Not only does such research allow for the early identification of potential learning disorders, but it further supports the phonological hypothesis of dyslexia in a manner unavailable to behavioural research.

Many researchers advocate a cautious optimism with regard to the marriage between education and neuroscience, and believe that to bridge the gap between the two, the development of new experimental paradigms is necessary and that these new paradigms should be designed to capture the relationships between neuroscience and education across different levels of analysis (neuronal, cognitive, behavioural).

== Neuroscience and education: Sample cases ==
=== Language and literacy ===
Human language is a unique faculty of the mind and the ability to understand and produce oral and written language is fundamental to academic achievement and attainments. Children who experience difficulties with oral language raise significant challenges for educational policy and practice; National Strategies, Every Child a Talker (2008). The difficulties are likely to persist during the primary school years where, in addition to core deficits with oral language, children experience problems with literacy, numeracy and behaviour and peer relations. Early identification and intervention to address these difficulties, as well as identification of the ways in which learning environments can support atypical language development are essential. Untreated speech and language needs result in significant costs both to the individual and to the national economy (ICAN, 2006).

Over the last decade, there has been a significant increase in neuroscience research examining young children's processing of language at the phonetic, word, and sentence levels. There are clear indications that neural substrates for all levels of language can be identified at early points in development. At the same time, intervention studies have demonstrated the ways in which the brain retains its plasticity for language processing. Intense remediation with an auditory language processing program has been accompanied by functional changes in left temporo-parietal cortex and inferior frontal gyrus. However, the extent to which these results generalize to spoken and written language is debated.

The relationships between meeting the educational needs of children with language difficulties and the findings of neuroscience studies are not yet established. One concrete avenue for progress is to use neuroscientific methods to address questions that are significant to practice in learning environments. For example, the extent to which language skills are attributable to a single common trait, and the consistency of such a trait over development, are matters of debate. However, direct assessments of brain activity can inform these debates. A detailed understanding of the sub-components of the language system, and the ways these change over time may inevitably yield implications for educational practice.

=== Mathematics ===
Mathematical skills are important not only for the national economy but also for an individual's life chances: low numeracy increases the probability of arrest, depression, physical illnesses, unemployment. One of the main causes of low numeracy is a congenital condition called dyscalculia. As the Foresight report on Mental Capital and Wellbeing puts it, "Developmental dyscalculia – because of its low profile but high impacts, its priority should be raised. Dyscalculia relates to numeracy and affects between 4–7% of children. It has a much lower profile than dyslexia but can also have substantial impacts: it can reduce lifetime earnings by £114,000 and reduce the probability of achieving five or more GCSEs (A*-C) by 7–20 percentage points. Home and school interventions have again been identified by the Project. Also, technological interventions are extremely promising, offering individualised instruction and help, although these need more development." (Executive Summary, Section 5.3) Understanding typical and atypical mathematical development is a crucial underpinning for the design of both the mainstream mathematics curriculum and for helping those who fail to keep up. Over the past ten years, a brain system for simple number processing has been identified and a handful of studies of children's brains that shed light on its development.

An increasing convergence of evidence suggests that dyscalculia may be due to a deficit in an inherited core system for representing the number of objects in a set, and how operations on sets affect number and in the neural systems that support these abilities. This core deficit affects the learner's ability to enumerate sets and to order sets by magnitude, which in turn make it very difficult to understand arithmetic, and very hard to provide a meaningful structure for arithmetical facts. Twin and family studies suggest that dyscalculia is highly heritable, and genetic anomalies, such as Turner's Syndrome, indicate an important role for genes in the X chromosome.

This suggestion that dyscalculia is caused by a deficits in a core deficit in number sense is analogous to the theory that dyslexia is due to a core deficit in phonological processing. Despite these similarities in terms of the scientific progress, public awareness of dyscalculia is much lower than it is for dyslexia. The UK's Chief Scientific Advisor, John Beddington, notes that, "developmental dyscalculia is currently the poor relation of dyslexia, with a much lower public profile. But the consequences of dyscalculia are at least as severe as those for dyslexia."

The application of neuroscience to understanding mathematical processing has already resulted in understanding beyond the early cognitive theories. Cognitive neuroscience research has revealed the existence of an innate 'number sense' system, present in animals and infants as well as adults, that is responsible for basic knowledge about numbers and their relations. This system is located in the parietal lobe of the brain in each hemisphere. This parietal system is active in children and adults during basic numerical tasks, but over the course of development it appears to become more specialised. Furthermore, children with mathematical learning disabilities (dyscalculia) show weaker activation in this region than typically developing children during basic number tasks. These results show how neuroimaging can provide important information about the links between basic cognitive functions and higher level learning, such as those between comparing two numbers and learning arithmetic.

In addition to this basic number sense, numerical information can be stored verbally in the language system, a system that neuroscience research is beginning to reveal as qualitatively different at the brain level to the number sense system. This system also stores information about other well learned verbal sequences, such as days of the week, months of the year and even poetry, and for numerical processing it supports counting and the learning of multiplication tables. While many arithmetic problems are so over learned that they are stored as verbal facts, other more complex problems require some form of visuo-spatial mental imagery. Showing that these subsets of arithmetic skills are supported by different brain mechanisms offers the opportunity for a deeper understanding of the learning processes required to acquire arithmetic proficiency.

Neuroimaging studies of mathematical learning disabilities are still rare but dyscalculia is an area of increasing interest for neuroscience researchers. Since different neural mechanisms contribute to different elements of mathematical performance, it may be that children with dyscalculia show variable patterns of abnormality at the brain level. For example, many children with dyscalculia also have dyslexia, and those that do may show different activation of the verbal networks that support maths, while those who have dyscalculia only, may show impairments of the parietal number sense system. Indeed, the few studies carried out on children with dyscalculia only point to a brain level impairment of the number sense system.

Such evidence is beginning to contribute to a theoretical debate between researchers who believe that dyscalculia is caused by a brain level deficit of the number sense and those who believe that the disorder stems from a problem in using numerical symbols to access the number sense information. With the continued development of theoretical models of dyscalculia that generate explicit testable hypotheses, progress should be rapid in developing research which investigates the link between mathematical learning disorders and their neural correlates.

=== Social and emotional cognition ===
In the last 10 years, there has been an explosion of interest in the role of emotional abilities and characteristics in contributing to success in all aspects of life. The concept of Emotional Intelligence (EI) has gained wide recognition and is featured in the Foresight report on Mental Capital and Wellbeing. Some have made influential claims that EI is more important than conventional cognitive intelligence, and that it can more easily be enhanced. Systematic research has yet to provide much support for these claims, although EI has been found to be associated with academic success and there is some evidence that it may be of particular importance for groups at-risk of academic failure and social exclusion. In spite of the weak evidence base, there has been a focus on promoting the social and emotional competence, mental health and psychological wellbeing of children and young people, particularly in schools as the result of the investment in universal services, prevention and early intervention (e.g., the Social and Emotional Aspects of Learning (SEAL) project in the UK [DfES, 2005, 2007]).

The neural basis of emotional recognition in typically developing children has been investigated, although there is little neuroimaging work on atypically developing children who process emotions differently. Males are commonly over-represented in these atypically developing populations and a female advantage is commonly reported both on EI measures and on most areas of emotion processing. In processing facial expressions the female advantage appears best explained by an integrated account considering both brain maturation and social interaction.

Prefrontal brain damage in children affects social behavior, causing insensitivity to social acceptance, approval or rejection. These brain areas process social emotions such as embarrassment, compassion and envy. Moreover, such damage impairs cognitive as well as social decision making in real world contexts supporting the Vygotskian view that social and cultural factors are important in cognitive learning and decision making. This view emphasizes the importance of bringing together neuroscientific and social constructionist perspectives, in this case in examining the influence of emotion on transferable learning.

However, there are currently many gaps in the attempt to bring together developmental science and neuroscience to produce a more complete understanding of the development of awareness and empathy. Educational research relies on pupil's accurate self-report of emotion, which may not be possible for some pupils, such as those with alexithymia. Emotional awareness can be measured using neuroimaging methods that show that differing levels of emotional awareness are associated with differential activity in amygdala, anterior insular cortex, and the medial prefrontal cortex. Studies of brain development in childhood and adolescence show that these areas undergo large-scale structural changes. Hence, the degree to which school-age children and young adults are aware of their emotions may vary across this time period, which may have an important impact on classroom behaviour and the extent to which certain teaching styles and curriculum approaches might be effective.

Neuroimaging work is also beginning to help in the understanding of social conduct disorders in children. For example, callous-unemotional traits in children are a particularly difficult problem for teachers to deal with, and represent a particularly serious form of conduct disturbance. Jones et al. (2009) showed that children with callous-unemotional traits revealed less brain activation in the right amygdala in response to fearful faces, suggesting that the neural correlates of that type of emotional disturbance are present early in development.

Researchers from the Centre for Educational Neuroscience in London have been instrumental in developing a research body that investigates how social cognition develops in the brain. In particular, Sarah-Jayne Blakemore, co-author of "The Learning Brain", has published influential research on brain development related to social cognition during adolescence. Her research, suggests that activity in brain regions associated with emotional processing undergo significant functional changes during adolescence.

=== Attention and executive control ===
Attention refers to the brain mechanisms that allow us to focus on particular aspects of the sensory environment to the relative exclusion of others. Attention modulates sensory processing in "top-down" fashion. Maintaining selective attention toward a particular item or person for a prolonged period is clearly a critical underpinning skill for the classroom. Attention is the key cognitive skill impaired in ADHD resulting in difficulty in completing tasks or attending to details. Aspects of attention may also be atypical in children showing anti-social behaviour and conduct disorders. From the perspective of basic neuroscience, recent evidence suggests that attention skills may be one of the human brain functions that respond best to early intervention and training (e.g.).

Further, from a neuroconstructivist perspective attention is a vital mechanism through which the child can actively select particular aspects of their environment for further learning. Executive functions include the abilities to inhibit unwanted information or responses, to plan ahead for a sequence of mental steps or actions, and to retain task-relevant and changing information for brief periods (working memory). Like attention, executive function abilities provide a critical platform for the acquisition of domain-specific knowledge and skills in an educational context. Further, recent studies show that preschool training of executive skills may prevent early school failure. Children with ADHD, anti-social behaviour, conduct disorders and autism can all show atypical patterns of executive function. Basic neuroscience studies have identified the primary brain structures and circuits involved in executive functions, including the prefrontal cortex, in adults. However, much research remains to be done to understand the development of this circuitry, and the genetic and neural bases of individual differences in executive function. Foresight Mental Capital and Wellbeing Project specifically identifies and highlights the importance of attention and executive function skills in the future challenges for difficulties in learning (sections 2.2.4 and 2.4 in "Learning Difficulties: Future Challenges").

== Neuroscience and education: A bridge too far? ==
Despite optimism from many who believe that neuroscience can make a meaningful contribution to education and that the potential exists for the establishment of a research field of educational neuroscience, some researchers believe that the differences between the two disciplines are too great for them to ever be directly linked in a practically meaningful way. In 1997 John Bruer published a major critique of what he called the "Neuroscience and education argument".

The 'neuroscience and education argument' as Bruer defines it, stems from three major findings in developmental neurobiology.

1. Early childhood is characterised by rapid growth in the number of synapses in the brain (synaptogenesis), and this expansion is followed by a pruning period.
2. There are so called experience dependant critical periods during which the developing brain is best suited to develop certain sensory and motor skills.
3. A stimulus rich environment causes greater synaptogenesis. The essential argument is that children are capable of learning more at an early age when they have an excess of synaptic growth and peak brain activity.

The knowledge of early brain development afforded by neurobiology has been used to support various arguments with regard to education. For example, the idea that any subject can be taught to young children in some intellectually honest form, due to the great adaptability and learning potential of the young brain. Alternatively, the idea that critical periods exist for learning certain skills or knowledge sets appeals to the fact that in animal studies, if the developing brain is deprived of certain sensory inputs, the brain areas responsible for processing those inputs fail to develop fully later in development, and thus "if you miss the window, you are playing with a handicap".

One of Bruer's major points of contention with reports in favour of neuroscience and education is the lack of actual neuroscience evidence. Reports such as Years of Promise: A Comprehensive Learning Strategy for America's Children (Carnegie Corporation of New York, 1996) cite many cognitive and behavioural psychology studies, but no more than a handful of brain based studies, and yet draws dramatic inferences with regard to the role of the brain in learning.

Bruer argues that behavioural science can provide a basis for informing educational policy, but the link to neuroscience is "a bridge too far", and the limitations of the application of neuroscience to education stem from the limitations of neuroscience knowledge itself. Bruer supports his critique by arguing the limitations of current knowledge regarding the three key tenets of the neuroscience and education argument. See Neuromyths.

Another problem is the discrepancy between spatial resolution of imaging methods and the spatial resolution of synaptic changes that are suggested to underlie learning processes. A similar problem is true with regard to the temporal resolution. This makes it hard to relate subcomponents of cognitive skills to brain function. However, the primary flaw of the education neuroscience argument in Bruer's opinion is that it attempts to link what happens at the synaptic level to higher order learning and instruction. The terminology, "Mind, brain and education" alludes to the idea that if we cannot bridge education and neuroscience directly, then we can use two existing connections to inform education. These are the link between cognitive psychology and education, and between cognitive psychology and neuroscience.

Bruer contends that neuroscience in its current form has little to offer educators at the practical level. Cognitive science on the other hand, can serve as a basis for the development of an applied science of learning and education. Other researchers have suggested alternative bridges to the cognitive psychology suggested by Bruer. Mason suggests that the gap between education and neuroscience can be best bridged by educational psychology, which she outlines as being concerned with "developing descriptive, interpretive and prescriptive models of student learning and other educational phenomena".

=== Challenges to educational neuroscience ===
Despite Willingham's assertion that the potential for neuroscience to contribute to educational practice and theory is already beyond doubt, he highlights three challenges that must be overcome to marry the two disciplines effectively.

The Goals Problem: Willingham suggests that education is a so-called "artificial science" that seeks to construct an 'artifact', in this case a set of pedagogic strategies and materials. Neuroscience, on the other hand is a so-called "natural science", concerned with the discovery of natural principles that describe neural structure and function. This difference means that some goals set by education are simply impossible to answer using neuroscience research, for example, the building of character or aesthetic sense in children.

The Vertical Problem: Levels of analysis: Willingham suggests that the highest level of analysis employed by neuroscientists is the mapping of brain structure and activity onto cognitive function, or even the interaction of cognitive functions (i.e. the impact of emotion on learning). Within neuroscience research these functions are studied in isolation for the sake of simplicity, and the nervous system as a whole, functioning in its entirety with all its huge composition of functional interactions, is not considered. For educators, on the other hand, the lowest level of analysis would be the mind of a single child, with levels increasing to incorporate the classroom, neighborhood, country etc.

Thus, importing research about a single cognitive factor in isolation, into a field in which context is essentially important creates an inherent difficulty. For example, while rote learning may be shown to improve learning in the research laboratory, the teacher cannot implement that strategy without considering the impact on the child's motivation. In return, it is difficult for neuroscientists to characterize such interactions in a research setting.

The Horizontal Problem: Translating research findings: While education theory and data are almost exclusively behavioral, findings from neuroscience research can take on many forms (e.g. electrical, chemical, spatial, temporal etc.). The most common form of data taken from neuroscience to education is the spatial mapping of brain activation to cognitive function. Willingham (2009) highlights the difficulty in applying such spatial information to educational theory. If a certain brain region is known to support a cognitive function relevant for education, what can actually be done with that information? Willingham suggests that this 'horizontal problem' can be solved only when a rich body of behavioral data and theories already exist, and points out that such methods have already been successful in identifying subtypes of dyslexia (e.g.).

Willingham suggests that what is essential for a successful union of neuroscience and education is that both fields have realistic expectations of one another. For example, educators should not expect that neuroscience will provide prescriptive answers for educational practice, answers for educational goals that are incompatible with neuroscientific methods (e.g. aesthetic training), or levels of analysis beyond the individual level. Finally Willingham suggests that neuroscience will only be useful to educators when targeted at a specific problem at a fine grained level of analysis, such as how people read, but that these data will only be useful in the context of well developed behavioral theories.

Other researchers, such as Katzir & Pareblagoev have pointed out that neuroimaging methodology as it stands may not be suitable for the examination of higher level cognitive functions, because it relies primarily on the 'subtraction method'. By this method, brain activity during a simple control task is subtracted from that of a 'higher order' cognitive task, thus leaving the activation that is related specifically to the function of interest. Katzir & Pareblagoev suggest that while this method may be very good for examining low level processing, such as perception, vision and touch, it is very hard to design an effective control task for higher order processing, such as comprehension in reading and inference making. Thus, some researchers argue that functional imaging technologies may not be best suited for the measurement of higher order processing. Katzir & Pareblagoev, suggest that this may not be a deficit of the technology itself, but rather of the design of experiments and the ability to interpret the results. The authors advocate using experimental measures in the scanner for which the behavioural data is already well understood, and for which there exists a strong theoretical framework.

=== Transforming challenges into opportunities ===
Another recent review of the educational neuroscience debate by Varma, McCandliss and Schwartz focuses on eight primary challenges, divided into scientific challenges and practical challenges, facing the field, and attempts to transform those challenges into opportunities.

==== Scientific challenges ====
Methods: Neuroscience methods create artificial environments and thus cannot provide useful information about classroom contexts. Furthermore, the concern is that if neuroscience begins to influence educational practice too heavily, there may be a de-emphasis of contextual variables, and solutions to educational problems may become primarily biological rather than instructional. However, Varma et al. argue that novel experimental paradigms create the opportunity to investigate context, such as brain activation following different learning procedures and that neuroimaging can also allow for the examination of strategic/mechanistic developmental changes that cannot be tapped by reaction time and behavioural measures alone. Furthermore, Varma et al. cite recent research that shows that the effects of cultural variables can be investigated using brain imaging (e.g.), and the results used to draw implications for classroom practice.

Data: Knowing the brain region that supports an elementary cognitive function tells us nothing about how to design instruction for that function. However, Varma et al. suggest that neuroscience provide the opportunity for a novel analyses of cognition, breaking down behaviour into elements invisible at the behavioural level. For example, the question of whether different arithmetic operations show different speed and accuracy profiles is the result of different efficiency levels within one cognitive system versus the use of different cognitive systems.

Reductionist Theories: Applying neuroscience terminology and theory to educational practice is a reduction and is of no practical use to educators. Nothing is gained be redescribing a behavioural deficit in neuroscientific terms. Varma et al. point out that reductionism is a mode by which sciences are unified, and that the co-opting of neuroscience terminology does not necessitate the elimination of education terminology, it simply provides the opportunity for interdisciplinary communication and understanding.

Philosophy: Education and neuroscience are fundamentally incompatible, because attempting to describe behavioural phenomena in the classroom by describing physical mechanisms of the individual brain is logically wrong. However, neuroscience may help to resolve internal conflicts within education resulting from differing theoretical constructs and terminologies used within subfields of education by providing a measure of uniformity with regard to results reporting.

==== Pragmatic concerns ====
Costs: Neuroscience methods are highly expensive, and the expected outcomes do not justify the costs. However, Varma et al. point out that educationally relevant neuroscience may attract addition funding to education research rather than usurping resources. The essential claim of educational neuroscience is that the two fields are interdependent and that a portion of the funding allocated collectively to the two fields should be directed towards shared questions.

Timing: Neuroscience, while expanding rapidly, is still in relative infancy with regard to the non-invasive study of healthy brains, and thus education researchers should wait until more data is collected and distilled into succinct theories. Contrary to this, Varma et al. argue that some success is already evident. For example, studies examining the success of dyslexia remediation programmes have been able to reveal the impact of these programmes on the brain networks supporting reading. This in turn leads to the generation of new research questions.

Control: If education allows neuroscience in the door, theories will increasingly be cast in terms of neural mechanisms and debates will rely increasingly on neuroimaging data. Neuroscience will cannibalise resources and education research will lose its independence. Varma et al. argue that the assumption of an asymmetric relationship between the two fields is unnecessary. Education has the potential to influence neuroscience, directing future research into complex forms of cognition and education researchers can help Educational Neuroscience to avoid naïve experiments and repetition of earlier mistakes.

Neuromyths: Thus far most of the neuroscience findings applied to education have turned out to be neuromyths, irresponsible extrapolations of basic research to education questions. Furthermore, such neuromyths have escaped beyond academia and are being marketed directly to teachers, administrators and the public. Varma et al. respond that the existence of neuromyths reveals a popular fascination with brain function. Appropriate translation of educational neuroscience results and well established collaborative research can decrease the likelihood of neuromyths.

=== A bidirectional relationship ===
Researchers such as Katzir & Pareblagoev and Cacioppo & Berntson (1992) argue that as well as neuroscience informing education, the educational research approach can contribute to the development of new experimental paradigms in neuroscience research. Katzir and Pareblagoev (2006) suggest the example of dyslexia research as a model of how this bidirectional collaboration might be achieved. In this case, theories of reading processes have guided both the design and interpretation of neuroscience research, but the existing theories were developed primarily from behavioural work. The authors suggest that the establishment of theories, which delineate required skills and subskills for educationally relevant tasks, is an essential requirement for educational neuroscience research to be productive. Furthermore, such theories need to suggest empirically testable connections between educationally relevant behaviours and brain function.

=== The role of educators ===
Kurt Fischer, director of Harvard University's Mind, Brain and Education graduate program states "One of the reasons there is so much junk out there is that there are so few people who know enough about education and neuroscience to put the thing together". Educators have been reliant upon others' expertise for the interpretations from Neuroscience hence have not been able to discern whether the claims made are valid or invalid representations of the research. Without a direct access to the primary research educators may be at risk of misusing results from neuroscience research. The need for so called 'middlemen' in the translation of research to practice has led to a situation where the application of cognitive neuroscience research findings is running ahead of the research itself.

In order to negate the need for middlemen, some researchers have suggested the need to developed a group of neuro-educators, a specially trained class of professionals whose role would be to guide the introduction of cognitive neuroscience into educational practice in a sensible and ethical manner. Neuro-educators would play a pivotal role in assessing the quality of evidence purporting to be relevant to education, assessing who is best placed to employ newly developed knowledge, and with what safeguards, and how to deal with unexpected consequences of implemented research findings.

Byrnes & Fox (1998) have suggested that developmental psychologists, educational psychologists and teachers generally fall into one of four orientations with respect to neuroscientific research "(1) those who readily accept (and sometimes over interpret) the results of neuroscientific studies; (2) those who completely reject the neuroscientific approach and consider the results of neuroscientific studies meaningless; (3) those who are unfamiliar with and indifferent toward, neuroscientific research; and (4) those who cautiously accept neuroscientific findings as being a proactive part of the total pattern of findings that have emerged from different corners of the cognitive and neural sciences". Greenwood (2009)^{[85]} suggests that as the body of knowledge available to educators increases, and the ability to be expert in all areas diminishes, the most productive standpoint would the fourth outlined by,^{[87]} that of cautious acceptance of neuroscientific findings and proactive collaboration.

Bennett & Rolheiser-Bennett (2001) point out that "teachers must be aware of and act on the science within the art of teaching". They suggest that educators must become aware of other methods and incorporate them into their practice. Furthermore, Bennett and Rolheiser-Bennett suggest that specific bodies of knowledge will play an important role in informing educators when making important decisions with regard to the "design of learning environments". The bodies of knowledge discussed include multiple intelligences, emotional intelligences, learning styles, the human brain, children at risk and gender. As the authors explain these and other areas are just "lenses designed to extend teachers' understanding of how students learn, and from that understanding, to make decisions about how and when to select, integrate, and enact items in the ... list".^{[88]}

Mason supports calls for a two-way constructive collaboration between neuroscience and education, whereby, rather than neuroscience research simply being applied to education, findings from neuroscience research would be used to constrain educational theorizing. In return, education would influence the types of research questions and experimental paradigms used in neuroscience research. Mason also gives the example that while pedagogical practice in the classroom may give rise to educational questions regarding the emotional bases of performance on school tasks, neuroscience has the potential to reveal the brain basis of higher-order thinking processes and thus may help to understand the role that emotion plays in learning and open new areas of study of emotional thought in the classroom.

== Neuromyths ==
The term "neuromyths" was first coined by an OECD report on understanding the brain; its synonym is "neurononsense". The term refers to the translation of scientific findings into misinformation regarding education. The OECD report highlights three neuromyths for special attention, although several others have been identified by researchers such as Usha Goswami.

1. The belief that hemispheric differences relate to different types of learning (i.e. left brain versus right brain).
2. The belief that the brain is plastic for certain types of learning only during certain "critical periods", and therefore that learning in these areas must occur during these periods.
3. The belief that effective educational interventions have to coincide with periods of synaptogenesis. Or in other words, children's environments should be enriched during the periods of maximal synaptic growth.

=== Left versus right brain ===
The idea that the two hemispheres of the brain may learn differently has virtually no grounding in neuroscience research. The idea has arisen from the knowledge that some cognitive skills appear differentially localised to a specific hemisphere (e.g., language functions are typically supported by left hemisphere brain regions in healthy right handed people). However, massive amount of fibre connections link the two hemispheres of the brain in neurologically healthy individuals. Every cognitive skill that has been investigated using neuroimaging to date employs a network of brain regions spread across both cerebral hemispheres, including language and reading, and thus no evidence exists for any type of learning that is specific to one side of the brain.

=== Critical periods ===
A critical period is a timeframe during the early life of an animal during which the development of some property or skill is rapid and is most susceptible to alteration. During a critical period, a skill or characteristic is most readily acquired. During this time, the plasticity is most dependent on experiences or environmental influences. Two examples of a critical period are the development of binocular vision and linguistic skills in children. The critical periods neuromyth is an overextension of certain neuroscience research findings (see above) primarily from research into the visual system, rather than cognition and learning. Although sensory deprivation during certain time periods can clearly impede the development of visual skills, these periods are sensitive rather than critical, and the opportunity for learning is not necessarily lost forever, as the term "critical" implies. While children may benefit from certain types of environmental input, for example, being taught a second language during the sensitive period for language acquisition, this does not mean that adults are unable to acquire foreign language skills later in life.

The idea of critical periods comes primarily from the work of Hubel and Wiesel. Critical periods generally coincide with periods of excess synapse formation, and end at around the same time that synaptic levels stabilise. During these periods of synaptic formation, some brain regions are particularly sensitive to the presence or absence of certain general types of stimuli. There are different critical periods within specific systems, e.g. visual system has different critical periods for ocular dominance, visual acuity and binocular function as well as different critical periods between systems, for example, the critical period for the visual system appears to end around the age of 12 years, while that for acquiring syntax ends around 16 years.

Rather than talking of a single critical period for general cognitive systems, neuroscientists now perceive sensitive periods of time during which the brain is most able to be shaped in a subtle and gradual fashion. Furthermore, critical periods themselves may be divided into three phases. The first, rapid change, followed by continued development with the potential for loss or deterioration, and finally a phase of continued development during which the system can recover from deprivation.

Although there is evidence for sensitive periods, we do not know whether they exist for culturally transmitted knowledge systems such as educational domains like reading and arithmetic. Further, we do not know what role synaptogenesis plays in the acquisition of these skills.

=== Enriched environments ===
The enriched environment argument is based on evidence that rats raised in complex environments perform better on maze tasks and have 20–25% more synaptic connections than those raised in austere environments. However, these enriched environments were in laboratory cages, and did not come close to replicating the intensely stimulating environment a rat would experience in the wild. Furthermore, the formation of these additional connections in response to novel environmental stimuli occurs throughout life, not just during a critical or sensitive period. For example, skilled pianists show enlarged representations in the auditory cortex relating specifically to piano tones, while violinists have enlarged neural representations for their left fingers. Even London taxi drivers who learn the London street map in intense detail develop enlarged formations in the part of the brain responsible for spatial representation and navigation. These results show that the brain can form extensive new connections as the result of focused educational input, even when this input is received solely during adulthood. Greenough's work suggests a second type of brain plasticity. Whereas synaptogenesis and critical periods relate to experience-expectant plasticity, synaptic growth in complex environments relates to "experience-dependent" plasticity. This type of plasticity is concerned with environment specific learning, and not to features of the environment that are ubiquitous and common to all members of the species, such as vocabulary.

Experience dependent plasticity is important because it does potentially link specific learning and brain plasticity, but it is relevant throughout the lifetime, not just in critical periods. "Experience-expectant plasticity", suggests that the environmental features necessary for fine tuning sensory systems are ubiquitous and of a very general nature. These kinds of stimuli are abundant in any typical child's environment. Thus, experience-expectant plasticity does not depend on specific experiences within a specific environment, and therefore cannot provide much guidance in choosing toys, preschools, or early childcare policies. The link between experience and brain plasticity is intriguing. No doubt learning affects the brain, but this relationship does not offer guidance on how we should design instruction.

Bruer also warns of the dangers of enriching environments on the basis of socio-economic value systems, and warns of a tendency to value typically middle class pursuits as more enriching than those associated with a working class lifestyle, when there is no neuroscientific justification for this.

=== Synaptogenesis ===
In addition some critics of the Educational Neuroscience approach have highlighted limitations in applying the understanding of early physiological brain development, in particular synaptogenesis to educational theory.

Synaptogenesis research has primarily been carried out on animals (e.g. monkeys and cats). Measures of synaptic density are aggregate measures, and it is known that different types of neuron within the same brain region differ in their synaptic growth rates [70]. Secondly, the purported "critical period" of birth to three years is derived from research on rhesus monkeys, who reach puberty at the age of three, and assumes that the period of synaptogenesis in humans exactly mirrors that of monkeys. It may be more reasonable to assume that this period of neural growth actually lasts until puberty, which would mean until early teenage years in humans.

Periods of intense synaptogenesis are typically correlated with the emergence of certain skills and cognitive functions, such as visual fixation, grasping, symbol use and working memory. However, these skills continue to develop well after the period that synaptogenesis is thought to end. Many of these skills continue to improve even after synaptic density reaches adult levels, and thus the most we can say is that synaptogenesis may be necessary for the emergence of these skills, but it cannot account entirely for their continued refinement. Some other form of brain change must contribute to ongoing learning.

Additionally, the types of cognitive changes usually seen to correlate with synaptogenesis revolve around visual, tactile, movement and working memory. These are not taught skills but rather skills that are usually acquired independent of schooling, even though they may support future learning. How these skills relate to later school learning is, however, unclear. We know that synaptogenesis occurs, and that the pattern of synaptogenesis is important for normal brain function. However, what is lacking is the ability of neuroscience to tell educators what sort of early childhood experiences might enhance children's cognitive capacities or educational outcomes.

=== Male versus female brain ===
The idea that a person can have a "male" brain or "female" brain is a misinterpretation of terms used to describe cognitive styles by when attempting to conceptualise the nature of cognitive patterns in people with autism spectrum disorder. Baron-Cohen suggested that while men were better "systemisers" (good at understanding mechanical systems), women were better "empathisers" (good at communicating and understanding others), therefore he suggested that autism could be thought of as an extreme form of the "male brain". There was no suggestion that males and females had radically different brains or that females with autism had a male brain.

=== Learning styles ===
A common myth in the field of education is that individuals have different learning styles, such as 'visual' or 'kinesthetic'. Many individuals will state preferences for how they want to learn, but there is no evidence that matching a teaching technique to a preferred style will improve learning, despite this hypothesis being tested multiple times. There may even be harms associated with the use of learning styles, wherein learners become 'pigeonholed', perceiving that they may not be suited to types of learning that are not matched to their 'learning style' (e.g. so-called visual learners may not wish to learn music). Despite this lack of evidence, a 2012 study demonstrated that a belief in the use of learning styles is widespread amongst teachers, and a 2015 study showed that the majority of research papers in higher education research mistakenly endorse the use of learning styles.

== See also ==
- Brain training
- Ten percent of brain myth
- The five-senses myth
- Psychobabble
- Cognitive advantages of bilingualism
- Cognitive style
