= Cooperative Institute for Climate Applications and Research =

US research institute partnership

The Cooperative Institute for Climate Applications and Research (CICAR) was a major collaborative relationship between the National Oceanic and Atmospheric Administration (NOAA) Office of Oceanic and Atmospheric Research (OAR) and Earth Institute, Columbia University.

The CICAR research themes were:

- Modeling, understanding, prediction, and assessment of climate variability and change
- Development, collection, analysis, and archiving of instrumental and Paleoclimate data
- Development of the application of climate variability and change prediction and assessment to provide information for decision makers and assess risk to water resources, agriculture, health, and policy

CICAR was sunset at the end of a 10-year cooperative agreement on June 30, 2014.
