= Ludy T. Benjamin =

American psychologist

Ludy T. Benjamin Jr.
- Born: December 26, 1945 (age 80); Corpus Christi, Texas
- Education: The University of Texas; Texas Christian University
- Awards: American Psychological Foundation Distinguished Teaching Award (1986)
- Scientific career
- Fields: Psychology
- Workplaces: Texas A&M University

Ludy T. Benjamin Jr. (born December 26, 1945) is an American psychologist and historian of psychology. He retired from Texas A&M University in 2012. He is a charter member of the Association for Psychological Science and a former director of the Office of Educational Affairs at the American Psychological Association (APA). He was president of two APA divisions, wrote more than 20 books and authored more than 150 journal articles and book chapters.

== Career ==
Ludy Benjamin was born in Corpus Christi, Texas in 1945. He received a BA in psychology from The University of Texas. He earned a PhD in experimental psychology from Texas Christian University in 1971. His studies specialized in perception. He was on the faculty of Nebraska Wesleyan University for several years, then spent two years directing the APA Office of Educational Affairs in Washington, DC. He became a faculty member at Texas A&M University in 1980. While at Texas A&M, Benjamin received numerous awards, including the Distinguished Teaching in Psychology Award from the American Psychological Foundation. He was one of the two inaugural recipients of a $25,000 teaching excellence award from the university, thought to be the largest monetary sum for an award bestowed annually by a single university. In May 2012, Benjamin retired from Texas A&M.

Benjamin is a fellow and charter member of the Association for Psychological Science. He has been the president of the Society for the History of Psychology (SHP) and the Society for the Teaching of Psychology (STP), both of which are divisions of the APA. He also served three terms as STP treasurer. Benjamin has written more than 20 books and authored more than 150 journal articles and book chapters. He delivered the APS David Myers Distinguished Lecture at the organization's annual conference in 2010. Benjamin helped to establish Teachers of Psychology in Secondary Schools (TOPSS) and chaired the committee that introduced the College Board's Advanced Placement Psychology Examination.

Benjamin won the 2001 APA Distinguished Career Contributions to Education and Training Award. The SHP presented its Lifetime Achievement Award to him in 2007. The STP awarded him a Presidential Citation in 2011. He received the APA Ernest Hilgard Award for Career Contributions for General Psychology in 2010. The Drs. Nicholas and Dorothy Cummings Center for the History of Psychology hosts the annual Ludy T. Benjamin Jr. Lecture each May at the University of Akron.

== Research ==
Benjamin's research as a historian of American psychology has focused on the metamorphosis of psychology from philosophical discourse to laboratory science. He has written about the establishment of the earliest of the psychology laboratories, about the development of the early psychological organizations and how those fostered the agenda of the new experimental psychology, about the initial applications of experimental psychology to education, business, and clinical practice, and about the ways in which psychologists sought to inform the American public about their science.

Benjamin's biography of Harry Kirke Wolfe (1858-1918), the second of Wundt's American graduates, documented the struggles of the early psychology laboratories in battling the more established sciences in American universities. That book was nominated for both of the top prizes awarded by the History of Science Society. Benjamin has also written on other Wundt doctorates in America. His research, based on archival records at the University of Leipzig, produced the first comprehensive treatment of Wundt's American students and their subsequent careers.

As one of the markers of a scientific discipline, the early psychological organizations were key to the development of experimental psychology. Benjamin published the first archivally based histories of the Midwestern and Eastern Psychological Associations, which were founded in 1902 and 1903 respectively. He has also published articles and book chapters on the Psychological Round Table (a somewhat secret organization of experimental psychologists begun in 1936), the American Psychological Association, and Titchener's Experimentalists (precursor to the Society of Experimental Psychologists). Central to this work on organizational history is an understanding of the roles these societies played in the research careers and social and intellectual lives of those involved (and, in some cases, those who were excluded), and ultimately the role they played in shaping the course of American psychology.

Benjamin has also published extensively on the beginnings of applied psychological research in business (e.g., his research on the early forays into advertising and product testing), education (e.g., work on child study and teaching machines), and clinical psychology. This work has documented the nineteenth century origins of applied psychology and its manifestation in a profession of psychology in the twentieth century. His book From Seance to Science: A History of the Profession of Psychology in America (coauthored with David Baker) was the first comprehensive history of professional psychology.

Finally, Benjamin is one of the leading figures writing on the history of psychology's public image, focusing on public understanding of psychology and the ways in which psychologists have sought to convey the nature and importance of their science to the public and to distinguish it from the popular psychology so often embraced by the public. This work has emphasized the social context in America that shaped the interests of psychologists and in turn shaped America's understanding of and attitudes toward psychology.

== Awards ==
- Distinguished Teaching Award, Texas A&M University, 1984
- Distinguished Teaching in Psychology Award, American Psychological Foundation, 1986
- Distinguished Faculty Achievement Award in Teaching, Texas A&M University, 1994
- Glasscock Professorship in Teaching Excellence, Texas A&M University, 1996-2007
- Psi Chi Teacher of the Year, Texas A&M University, 1998-1999
- Fasken Chair in Distinguished Teaching, TAMU, 2000-2005
- Distinguished Career Contributions to Education and Training Award, APA, 2001
- Presidential Commendation, American Psychological Association, 2002
- Presidential Professor of Teaching Excellence, 2003–present
- Helmut Adler Award, Psychology Section, New York Academy of Sciences, 2003
- Presidential Citation, Southwestern Psychological Association, 2004
- Distinguished Faculty Achievement Award in Teaching, Texas A&M University, 2005
- Honors Teacher/Scholar Award, Texas A&M University, 2007
- Lifetime Achievement Award, Society for the History of Psychology, APA, 2007
- SLATE Teaching Excellence Award, Texas A&M University, 2009
- Ernest Hilgard Award, Division 1, American Psychological Association, 2010
- Presidential Citation, Society for the Teaching of Psychology, 2011

== Selected works ==
- Benjamin, L. T., Hopkins, J. R. and Nation, J. R. Psychology. Macmillan, 1987.
- Benjamin, L. T., Jr. Harry Kirke Wolfe: Pioneer in Psychology. University of Nebraska Press, 1991.
- Benjamin, L. T. A History of Psychology in Letters. 1992.
- Benjamin, L. T. A History of Psychology: Original Sources and Contemporary Research. McGraw-Hill, 1996.
- Benjamin, L. T. A Brief History of Modern Psychology. Blackwell Publishers, 2006.
- Benjamin, L. T. (ed.). Favorite Activities for the Teaching of Psychology. American Psychological Association, 2008.
- Green, C. D. and Benjamin, L. T. (eds.). Psychology Gets in the Game: Sport, Mind and Behavior, 1880-1960. 2009.

== See also ==
- History of psychology
