= Psychobabble =

Form of speech or writing that uses psychological jargon in a misleading way

Psychobabble (a portmanteau of "psychology" or "psychoanalysis" and "babble") is a term for pseudo-scientific language that uses psychological jargon and buzzwords in a manner that may lack accuracy, genuine meaning, or relevance.

== Origin of the term ==
Psychobabble was defined by the writer who coined the word, R.D. Rosen, as

a set of repetitive verbal formalities that kills off the very spontaneity, candour, and understanding it pretends to promote. It’s an idiom that reduces psychological insight to a collection of standardized observations that provides a frozen lexicon to deal with an infinite variety of problems.

The word itself came into popular use after his 1977 publication of Psychobabble: Fast Talk and Quick Cure in the Era of Feeling.

Rosen coined the word in 1975 in a book review for The Boston Phoenix, then featured it in a cover story for the magazine New Times titled "Psychobabble: The New Language of Candor." His book Psychobabble explores the dramatic expansion of psychological treatments and terminology in both professional and non-professional settings.

== Contexts and uses ==
In the 2012 book Psychobabble: Exploding the Myths of the Self-help Generation Stephen Briers critiqued the increasing use of psychobabble in the self-help industry and popular psychology, and its permeation into areas such as business coaching and corporate culture. He wrote that psychobabble is "often lazy pseudoscience that ought to be robustly interrogated so we can see what’s real, solid and potentially useful to us, and what is just smoke and mirrors."

Scott Lilienfeld and Donald Meichenbaum wrote in 2018 that psychobabble is often used in promoting psychological interventions that may be overhyped, lack evidence, or pseudoscientific, through the use of language that appears scientific but lacks substance.

=== Neurobabble ===
Barry Beyerstein wrote in 1990 that neurobabble can appear in "ads [that] suggest that brain 'repatterning' will foster effortless learning, creativity, and prosperity." He wrote about the use of left/right brain pseudoscience and other "neuromythologies" by New Age products and techniques. He stated that "the purveyors of neurobabble urge us to equate truth with what feels right and to abandon the commonsense insistence that those who would enlighten us provide at least as much evidence as we demand of politicians or used-car salesmen."

According to Lilienfeld and Meichenbaum neurobabble and "naive biological reductionism" is commonly used in the promotion of psychological interventions that may be pseudoscientific or overhyped. This can include the use of terms such as "sensorimotor integration", "neuroplasticity", "synaptic networks", "hemispheric synchronization", and "body memories." They write that many proponents of interventions explain their treatments with "dubious neurological hypotheses" which have very limited scientific support, and are premature "given our present lack of understanding of how to bridge the vast gulf between the neural and psychological levels of analysis".

== Characteristics ==
Scott Lilienfeld and Donald Meichenbaum state that terms used in psychobabble can include "holistic healing", "codependency", "closure", "synergy", "sex addiction", and "inner child". Psychologist Ahona Guha wrote in 2024 about the use in speech and online of terms from "therapy speak" such as "validation", "trauma", "attachment", "gaslighting", "narcissism" and "ADHD". In 1977 Rosen gave examples of psychobabble used in speech such as "high-energy experience", "getting in touch with yourself", "whole person", and "go with the feeling". Examples of psychobabble appear in Cyra McFadden's satirical novel The Serial: A Year in the Life of Marin County (1977). British scholar and novelist David Lodge gave a structural analysis of the language used in the novel, examining spatial metaphors in slang such as referring to the "space" someone is in.

In 2010, Theodore Dalrymple defined psychobabble as "the means by which people talk about themselves without revealing anything."

== See also ==
- Brain training
- Christianese – Christian religious terminology and jargon
- Corporatese – Buzzwords and specialized vocabulary used by businesspeople
- Legalese – Terminology and jargon typical for legal matters
- Neuromyth
- Technobabble – Jargon-sounding nonsense
- Platitude – Trite, prosaic, or cliché truism
- Euphemism – Mild or indirect word or expression
- Glittering generality – Phrase which appeals to positive emotion without supporting reason
