= Overdosed America =

2004 book by John Abramson

Overdosed America: The Broken Promise of American Medicine
- Author: John Abramson
- Subject: Unnecessary health care
- Publisher: Harper Perennial
- Publication date: 2004
- Publication place: United States
- Pages: 384
- ISBN: 978-0061344763
- OCLC: 55044815

Overdosed America: The Broken Promise of American Medicine is a 2004 book by American physician John Abramson about unnecessary healthcare.

== Reviews ==
A reviewer for The BMJ called the book "the latest in a series of searing indictments of a medical profession apparently duped by the false promise of technology, and too often compromised by cold hard cash from the companies selling the drugs and devices". The reviewer for The Washington Post stated that the strength of the book was in its ability to discuss articles from scientific journals. Another reviewer said that in the book the author "presents a strong indictment of the evidence that dictates medical practice, a challenge that is credible only because Abramson backs up his statements with detailed analyses of the prevailing evidence".
