= Alexis R. Abramson =

American mechanical engineer

- Abramson at 2026 NYCW event

Dean of Columbia Climate School
- Incumbent
- Assumed office January 1, 2025

Personal details
- Born: Cleveland, Ohio
- Education: Tufts University (BS, MS); University of California, Berkeley (PhD)
- Scientific career
- Fields: Mechanical engineering
- Thesis: Thermal energy transport in micro/nanostructures (2002)

Alexis Ryan Abramson is an American mechanical engineer, currently serving as the dean of the Columbia Climate School since January 2025.

She served as the 13th dean of the Thayer School of Engineering at Dartmouth College from 2019 to 2024.

== Education and career ==
Alexis R. Abramson earned her bachelor of science and master of science degrees in mechanical engineering from Tufts University and a PhD in mechanical engineering from the University of California, Berkeley. Her doctoral dissertation was titled Thermal energy transport in micro/nanostructures (2002).

Abramson joined the Columbia Climate School at Columbia University in January 2025 as its 2nd dean. Previously, Abramson served as dean of Thayer School of Engineering (Dartmouth Engineering) from 2019 to 2024. She was the second woman ever to hold this position in the engineering school's more than 150-year history.

Prior to Dartmouth, she was the Milton and Tamar Maltz Professor of Energy Innovation at Case Western Reserve University, where she had served on the mechanical and aerospace engineering faculty since 2003. During her time at Case Western Reserve, Abramson served in a variety of leadership roles, including as director of the Case Western Reserve's Great Lakes Energy Institute and as interim chair of the university's electrical engineering and computer science department.

In addition, Abramson has served in a number of roles outside of the university. During President Obama's administration, Abramson was chief scientist and manager of the Emerging Technologies Division at the U.S. Department of Energy's Building Technologies Program, which invests in research, development, and commercialization of energy-efficient and cost-effective building technologies that are within five years of being market-ready. In 2018, she served as a technical adviser for Breakthrough Energy Ventures. From 2006 to 2009, she served as Executive Director of the Nano-Network and Vice President for Technology Innovation at NorTech, where she leveraged technology development and commercialization opportunities at companies and academic institutions in the region.

Abramson is also one of the co-founders of Edifice Analytics, a Cleveland Heights-based company that has developed technology to conduct building energy audits virtually using smart-meter data.

== Honors and awards ==
- Executive Leadership in Academic Technology and Engineering (ELATE) Fellowship (2014)
- Mather Spotlight Prize from Case Western Reserve University (2012)
- National Science Foundation CAREER Award (2005–2010)
