= Millennium Cities Initiative =

The Millennium Cities Initiative (MCI) is a project of the Earth Institute at Columbia University. Founded by Earth Institute director Professor Jeffrey Sachs in 2006, MCI aims to assist through research and policy analysis selected mid-sized cities across sub-Saharan Africa, located near Millennium Villages, to achieve the Millennium Development Goals (MDGs). The project's initial focus is on policy analysis impacting foreign direct investment (FDI), with a view to creating employment, stimulating domestic enterprise development and fostering economic growth. In addition to foreign investment, the MCI is working to promote an integrated City Development Strategy. The MCI draws upon, and strengthens, the MDGs work already underway by adding a focused urban-based component. MCI aims to demonstrate through its research and policy analysis that more FDI can be attracted to regional urban centers in Africa, with the resulting employment and economic growth effects. The Initiative will also produce urban development strategies issuing from the Initiative’s own MDG-based needs assessments that will inform municipal and national governments and their donors of the accurate, actual costs of achieving the MDGs.
