= Arthur von Abramson =

Imperial Russian civil engineer (1854–?)

- Born: 3 March 1854; Odessa, Kherson Governorate, Russian Empire
- Education: University of Odessa; Zurich Polytechnikum

Arthur von Abramson (born 3 March 1854) was an Imperial Russian civil engineer.

He was born to a Jewish family in Odessa, and was educated at the city's gymnasium. He studied mathematics at the University of Odessa, but left to take a course in civil engineering at the Zurich Polytechnikum, from which he was graduated in 1876. Returning to Russia in 1879, von Abramson passed the state examination at the Russian Imperial Institute of Roads and Communications, and was appointed one of the directors of the Russian state railway at Kiev. He devised, built, and managed the sewer system of Kiev, and constructed the street-railroad of that city. In 1881 he founded and became editor-in-chief of a technical monthly, Inzhener ('The Engineer'). He was appointed president of the local sewer company and director of the Kiev city railroad.

== Publications ==
- "Stand der Städtereinigungs-Frage in Russland". Gesundheits-Ingenieur (in German). 6 (1): 5–10. 15 January 1883. Published in English as "The State of Town-Drainage in Russia". Minutes of Proceedings of the Institution of Civil Engineers. 73. London: Institution of Civil Engineers: 426–428. 1883.
- "Die Standes- und Titel-Verhältnisse der Ingenieure und Architekten in Russland" [The Status of the Engineer and Architect in Russia]. Zeitschrift des Österreichischen Ingenieur- und Architekten-Vereines (in German). 29. Vienna: 437–440. 22 July 1898.
