= Frederick B. Abramson =

American lawyer (1935–1991)

President of the District of Columbia Bar
- In office June 1985 – June 1986

Personal details
- Born: 1935 New York City, U.S.
- Died: June 1, 1991 (aged 55–56) Washington, D.C., U.S.
- Education: Stuyvesant High School; Yale University; University of Chicago Law School (JD)
- Profession: Lawyer

Frederick B. Abramson (1935 in New York, New York – June 1, 1991 in Washington, D.C.) was a Washington D.C. lawyer who served as President of the District of Columbia Bar from June 1985 to June 1986.

== Early life and education ==
Abramson was raised in Harlem- his father was an elevator operator, and his mother was a food service worker - but he attended a program for gifted students at Stuyvesant High School, before transferring to Cornwall Academy in Connecticut after receiving a scholarship that his sister had seen advertised in the Amsterdam News. He was the first African-American student to attend Cornwall, and later became one of only four African-American students in his class at Yale University, from which he graduated in 1956, also after receiving a scholarship. He went on to earn his J.D. degree from the University of Chicago Law School in 1959.

== Career ==
Abramson settled in Washington, D.C., where he practiced law and participated in the governance of the legal profession for the rest of his life.

After stints in the United States Justice Department and with the U.S. Equal Employment Opportunity Commission, Abramson went into private practice. He was one of the first black associates in a major Washington law firm while working for the firm of Arnold & Porter from 1969 to 1973, when he became a partner in Rollinson & Schaumberg. In 1977, Abramson became a partner in Sachs, Greenebaum & Taylor, where he would remain until 1990. In January 1991, he became the first African-American head of the Office of Bar Counsel for the District of Columbia Court of Appeals, supervising investigations of attorneys alleged to have violated the Rules of Professional Responsibility. He held the position for only five months before succumbing to pneumonia at the age of 56.

At the time of his death Abramson was also Chairman of the Board of Trustees of the David A. Clarke School of Law. He also served nine years on the D.C. Judicial Nomination Commission (four as Chair), and was a member of the ABA Commission on Opportunities for Minorities, the ABA Standing Committee on the Federal Judiciary, the boards of directors of the Washington Lawyers' Committee for Civil Rights and Urban Affairs, Public Defender Service for the District of Columbia, National Women's Law Centre and Century National Bank of Washington.

Abramson's death prompted members of the District's legal community to create the Frederick B. Abramson Memorial Foundation, now doing business as the Abramson Scholarship Foundation (ASF). ASF provides critical financial assistance and comprehensive mentoring to promising DC public high school graduates attending four-year colleges.
