= Adelina Kondrátieva =

Argentinian translator (1917–2012)

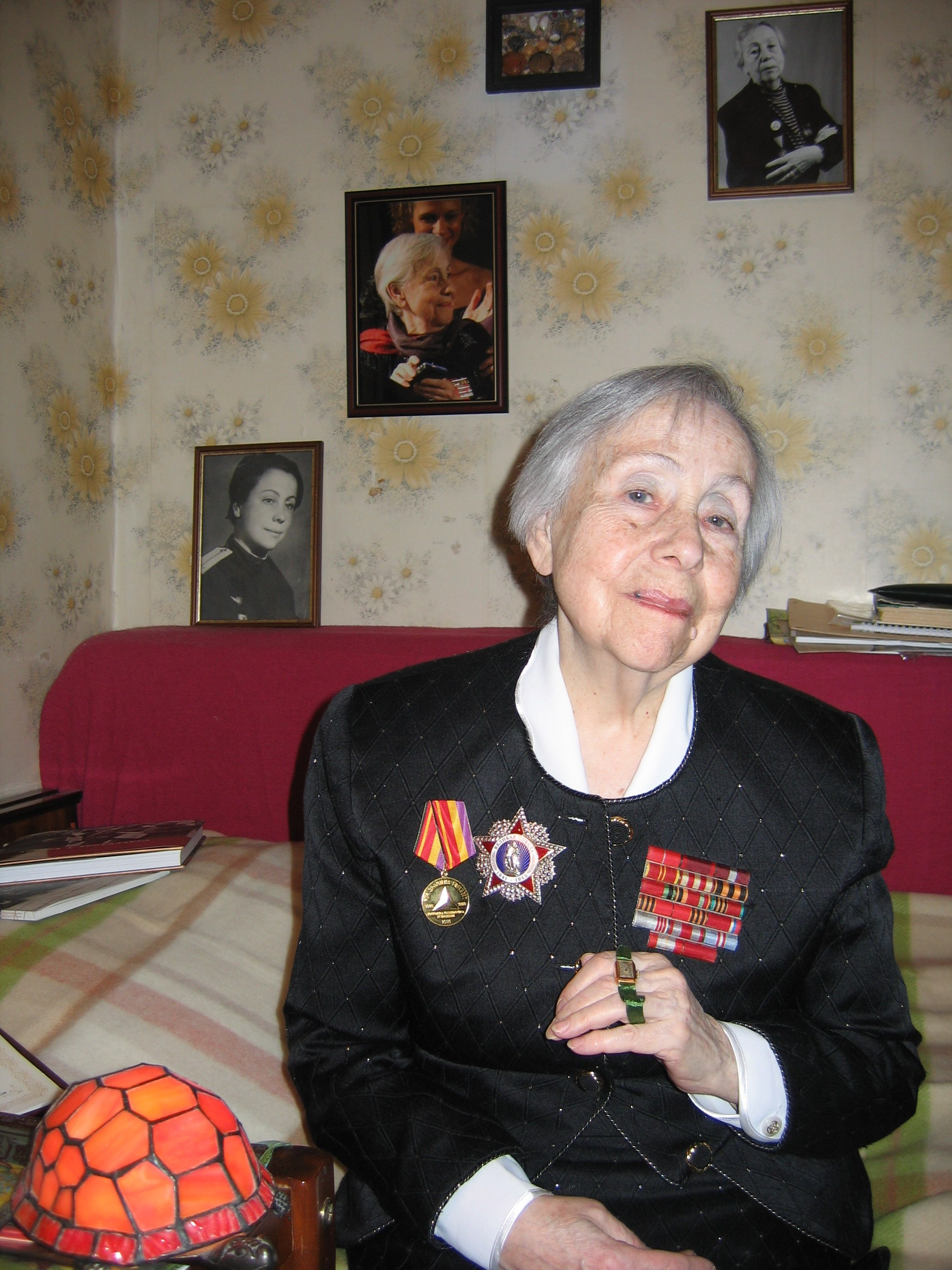
- Born: Adelina Veniaminovna Abramson; 1917; Buenos Aires, Argentina
- Died: 14 December 2012 (aged 95); Moscow, Russia
- Occupation: Translator
- Organization: Archive, War, and Exile Association
- Spouse: Aleksandr Kondrátiev
- Children: 1
- Awards: Order of the Red Star

Adelina Kondrátieva (née Abramson; 1917 – 14 December 2012) was an Argentine-born Russian translator and Brigadista who participated in the Spanish Civil War on the Republican side. For her subsequent dedication to that historical period, she was elected president of the Archive, War, and Exile Association (AGE), and in 2009 she was granted a Spanish passport.

== Biography ==
Adelina Veniaminovna Abramson was born in Buenos Aires in 1917, the daughter of Benjamin Abramson. Her family had gone into exile there in 1910, fleeing the Russian Tsarist regime, and her father worked there as a commercial delegate. After General José Félix Uriburu's coup in September 1932, Abramson was "arrested, tortured, and expelled." Adelina, along with her father, mother, and older sister Paulina, moved to Montevideo, and from there they managed to return to the Soviet Union. The "Trotskyist" label that Abramson was saddled with limited his reintegration into the new Soviet structure – Adelina had to apply three times to join the Union of Communist Youth – to the point that in January 1937, Adelina and her father left the USSR clandestinely. After a rocambolesque trip, they arrived in Spain, where Paulina was already waiting for them.

== Spanish Civil War ==
Once in Barcelona, Benjamin Abramson marched to the Aragon front, while his daughters continued on to Valencia. There, Adelina came into contact with Yakov Smushkevich (who called himself "General Douglas"), a Republican aviation commander, who offered her a post as interpreter and translator within the General Staff of the Republican Air Force in the Los Llanos estate, near Albacete. In her memoirs, she recalls witnessing the bombing to which the city was subjected by Francoist forces on 20 February 1937.

At the same time, her sister Paulina Abramson worked as a translator with the filmmaker Roman Karmen and journalist Mikhail Koltsov. She subsequently worked as an interpreter at the service of Commander Hadzhi-Umar Mamsurov, "advisor to Durruti in the defense of Madrid and organizer of the XIV Guerrilla Corps of the Republic".

== Return to the USSR ==
In 1938, the Abramson family returned to Moscow and Adelina entered the Workers' University for adults, specializing in the "history of the American trade union movement". She went to work at the Military Language Institute, and in 1941 she began studying Italian at the Military Faculty of Foreign Languages. A senior lieutenant of the Red Army, she actively served from 1941 to 1949. During the Axis invasion of the USSR, she mainly worked as an interpreter in Italian prisoner-of-war camps. After the war, she was decorated with the Order of the Red Star. She married Aleksandr Kondrátiev, a soldier, and gave birth to their daughter Yelena. However, the progressive rise of Stalinism spelled a similar fate for her father as that of other Spanish Civil War veterans – he was arrested in 1951, at the age of 63, accused of Trotskyism, held for five years in the Gulag, and released after Stalin's death.

Kondrátieva earned a doctorate at Moscow State University and became head of the Spanish chair at the Pedagogical Institute. She dedicated the last period of her life to becoming involved in some of the most delicate chapters in the history of Spain, co-authoring works with Ángel Viñas and Paul Preston. She led the Spanish section of military participants in the Civil War in the Veterans Committee of Russia, and maintained close connections with Russian Spaniards and the Spanish Center in Moscow. In 1994, she published the memoir Mosaico roto (Broken Mosaic), written in collaboration with her sister Paulina. She is considered one of the main promoters of the recovery of historical memory, along with Dolores Cabra. She was involved with the Tribute to the International Brigades organized in 1996 and the creation of the AGE in 1998, which she presided over until her death. In 2009, she was presented with a Spanish passport for her participation in the Civil War.

Adelina Kondrátieva died in Moscow on 14 December 2012, at age 95.
