= Popular psychology =

Simplified everyday psychology

Popular psychology (sometimes shortened as pop psychology or pop psych) refers to the concepts and theories about human mental life and behavior that are supposedly based on psychology and are considered credible and accepted by the wider populace. The concept is cognate with the human potential movement of the 1950s and 1960s.

The term pop psychologist can be used to describe authors, consultants, lecturers, and entertainers who are widely perceived as being psychologists, not because of their academic credentials, but because they have projected that image or have been perceived in that way in response to their work.

The term is often used in a pejorative fashion to describe psychological concepts that appear oversimplified, out of date, unproven, misunderstood or misinterpreted; however, the term may also be used to describe professionally produced psychological knowledge, regarded by most experts as valid and effective, that is intended for use by the general public.

== Types ==
Popular psychology commonly takes the form of:

- self-help books, for example The Road Less Travelled, by M. Scott Peck;
- advice dispensed through radio, TV, and print; for example Dear Abby, Dr. Phil and Dan Savage;
- myths such as "People use only about 10 percent of their brain's capacity";
- terminology that may have a basis in psychology, but which appears more frequently in the vernacular than in professional discourse—for example, inner child, left brain/right brain, emotional intelligence, Freudian slip, and enneagram;
- public perceptions about psychological methodologies that have not been scientifically validated, such as neuro-linguistic programming;
- urban legends such as "Psychologist B. F. Skinner raised his own daughter in a 'Skinner box'".

== Self-help ==
Popular psychology is an essential ingredient of the self-help industry.

According to Fried and Schultis, criteria for a good self-help book include "claims made by the author as to the book's efficacy, the presentation of problem-solving strategies based on scientific evidence and professional experience, the author's credentials and professional experience, and the inclusion of a bibliography."

Three potential dangers of self-help books are:

- people may falsely label themselves as psychologically disturbed;
- people may misdiagnose themselves and use material that deals with the wrong problem;
- people may not be able to evaluate a program and may select an ineffective one;

== Psychobabble ==
The misuse and overuse of technical psychological terms is called psychobabble.

Sometimes psychological jargon is used to dress up sales pitches, self-help programs, and New Age ideas to lend these endeavors a respectable scientific appearance. Other times, people use psychological terminology to describe everyday, normal experiences in a way that pathologize a normal behavior, such as feeling sad after a loss, by suggesting that unpleasant emotions are a type of psychopathology, like major depressive disorder. People may use psychobabble because they believe that complex, descriptive or special esoteric terms more clearly or more dramatically communicate their experiences of social and personal situations, or because they believe that it makes them sound more educated.

Some terms that have an origin in psychological terminology and are typically misused include co-dependent, dysfunctional, meaningful relationship, narcissistic, antisocial, traumatic bonding, synergy, and gaslighting.

== History ==
Early movements in the history of American psychology can explain the importance our culture places on the field at large.

=== Rise of psychology in the United States ===
Beginning late in the 19th century, and largely influenced by German scholar Wilhelm Wundt, Americans including James Mckeen Cattell, G. Stanley Hall, William James, and others helped to formalize psychology as an academic discipline in the United States. Popularity in psychology grew as the public became more aware of the field. In 1890, James published The Principles of Psychology, which produced a surge of public interest. In 1892, James wrote Psychology: The Briefer Course as an opportunity for the public to read and understand psychological literature. In a similar attempt in 1895, E. W. Scripture, another American psychologist, published a book, called Thinking, Feeling, Doing, that was adapted for the average reader.

=== Popular misconceptions and the effort to counteract ===
Despite the various publications, the general public had minimal understanding of what psychologists did and what psychology was all about. Many believed psychology was "mind reading and spiritualism" and that it had no real application in everyday life, whereas in reality, psychology was more about studying normal human behaviors and experiences that could very well have strong applications to everyday life.

Thus, regardless of the mass interest in psychology, an accurate account of psychology for the layman was rare. Many psychologists became concerned that their profession was failing appropriately to reach the public.

In 1893, Joseph Jastrow and Hugo Münsterberg led a public exhibit on psychology in the World's Columbian Exposition in Chicago as an effort to celebrate psychology, offer information to the public, and correct popular misconceptions. The exhibit provided catalogs of information on equipment, research topics, and purposes of psychology. In a similar attempt to inform the public, the 1904 Louisiana Purchase Exposition in St. Louis included (among others) presentations from G. Stanley Hall, Edward B. Titchener, Mary Whiton Calkins, John B. Watson, and Adolph Meyer. The exhibits also included public testing and experimentation.

Although admirable, the attempt to seek public approval failed to make a significant impact and psychologists became more concerned about their public image. In 1900, Jastrow wrote a book entitled Fact and Fable in Psychology that aimed to resolve popular psychological misconceptions by clearly discerning fact from fable. In preface to his book, Jastrow states, "It is a matter of serious concern that the methods of genuine psychology, that the conditions of advance in psychology, that the scope and nature of its problems should be properly understood." (vii)

=== Popularization of psychology ===
It was not until the more powerful movement of applied psychology that popularity in psychology grew to affect people's everyday lives. The work of G. Stanley Hall in educational psychology led changes in the approaches of teaching and the Child-Study movement, supported in experimental psychology, and guided educational reform.

Several critics warned that applying experimental psychology to education may be problematic. In 1898, Münsterberg wrote a controversial article entitled "The Danger from Experimental Psychology" in which he claims the impossible transfer of experimental results into successful teaching practices.

Despite the disagreements, popular culture grasped onto the implications in the field of applied psychology with the hope that the research could improve their lives. Early applications included clinical psychology, business, industrial psychology, and the psychology of advertising. Furthermore, the onset of World War I led to advances in psychology brought about by its application in military psychology.

The media provided the public more accessible psychological information through the publication of countless books and popular magazines including Harpers, Forum, Atlantic Monthly, and Colliers. After WWI, demand grew for a more frequent source of popular psychology and newspapers became a primary source of public information. In fact, newspaper columns were so well-received that professional psychologist Jastrow had a column entitled Keeping Mentally Fit that appeared in more than 150 newspapers in the 1920s.

Soon, public demand for psychological services and information grew so fierce that the availability of legitimate research and real psychologists became insufficient. Consequently, nonprofessionals began to offer their services under the guise of psychologists.

The American Psychological Association (APA) responded with an effort to establish official certifications for trained psychologists. However, popular interest overlooked the qualifications and eagerly sought to apply popular psychological science regardless of its validity.

Short-lived, the excitement over useful psychology was curbed by articles warning of the exaggerated and false claims made by popular psychology. Stephen Leacock described the changing popularity in psychology in 1924, stating,

As part of the new researches, it was found that psychology can be used... for almost everything in life. There is now not only psychology in the academic or college sense, but also a Psychology of Business, Psychology of Education, a Psychology of Salesmanship, a Psychology of Religion... and a Psychology of Playing the Banjo. In short, everybody has his.

Others authored similar cautions to the public and, among the most recursive, was that of Grace Adams (psychologist) who, in her 1928 article, wrote

a vociferous attack on applied psychology [and] argued that psychology had forsaken its scientific roots so that individual psychologists might achieve popularity and prosperity.

After the Depression hit in 1929, popular literature began to decline while scientific publications in periodicals increased. This discrepancy between the public sector and academia supported the popular belief that professional psychologists were not interested in solving America's problems. The lack of professional participation provided pseudoscientific and unprofessional psychological literature to become very popular. In the 1930s, self-help books and the publication of three magazines (Modern Psychologist, Practical Psychology Monthly, and Psychology Digest) became part of a popular psychology movement.

World War II gave professional psychology another chance to prove its value as a science with an increase in professional opportunities. In the article "Don't They Understand Us? A history of Psychology's Public Image", Benjamin describes the direction of psychology at the time:

The praise psychologists received from government, industry, and the military provided a tremendous boost for the public image of psychology... Yet many contemporary psychologists are concerned that the current image is far from acceptable and that the science and profession of psychology continues to suffer because of that image.

=== Current status of popular psychology ===
In his Presidential Address to the APA in 1969, George Armitage Miller was hopeful for psychology's future stating, "that the real impact of psychology will be felt, ... through its effects on the public at large, through a new and different public conception of what is humanly possible and what is humanly desirable."

Current events influence the popularity of areas in psychology. During 2020 and 2021 many of the most popular psychology articles were about COVID-19 and even Zoom fatigue. The APA's most downloaded journal articles frequently include research about social media. Social media frequently spreads misinformation about health, and this could extend to mental health misinformation. Psychobabble can be used on social media to spread this misinformation. However, social media can be a place where pop psychology is used to spread mental health awareness.

=== Limits and criticism ===
A June 2023 article by Vox Media explored the limits of pop psychology terms ("therapy speak") saying "people become attached to terms that encapsulate certain events and people, to varying degrees, in order to bolster an argument or justify an experience. Having common language to describe a difficult situation can help people more effectively communicate their concerns and garner support, but these terms can just as easily be weaponized."

== See also ==
- Folk psychology
- Just-so story
- List of common misconceptions about science, technology, and mathematics § Psychology and neuroscience
- New Age
- Popular science
- Self-help
