= John Abramson =

American physician and author

John David Abramson is an American physician and the author of the book Overdosed America: The Broken Promise of American Medicine. He has worked as a family doctor in Appalachia and in Hamilton, Massachusetts, and has served as chairman of the department of family practice at Lahey Clinic. He was a Robert Wood Johnson Foundation Fellow and is on the clinical faculty of Harvard Medical School, where he teaches primary care and public health policy.

== Education ==
He graduated from Harvard College. In 1974, he received a BMS from Dartmouth Medical School followed by his MD from Brown Medical School.

== Career ==
In October 2013, Abramson was the lead author of an article published in The BMJ titled, "Should people at low risk of cardiovascular disease take a statin?" The authors claimed that a study had shown that a substantial percentage of statin drug users had experienced side effects. In May 2014, the journal published a "correction" that declared: "The conclusion and summary box of this Analysis article by Abramson and colleagues stated that side effects of statins occur in about 18-20% of patients. The authors withdraw this statement." On November 13, 2013, The New York Times published a commentary by Abramson and Rita F. Redberg which echoed the subsequently retracted BMJ claim that "18 percent or more of this group [of statin users] would experience side effects, including muscle pain or weakness, decreased cognitive function, increased risk of diabetes (especially for women), cataracts or sexual dysfunction."

== Books ==
- Sickening: How Big Pharma Broke American Health Care and How We Can Repair It. Mariner Books, 2022 ISBN 9780063268722
- Overdosed America: The Broken Promise of American Medicine. Harper, 2004 ISBN 978-0061344763
