= Kate Abramson =

American philosophy academic

Kate Abramson is an American philosopher who is a Mahlon Powell Professor of Philosophy and Director of Undergraduate Studies at Indiana University.

Abramson earned her Ph.D. in Philosophy at the University of Chicago in 1997. In 2024, she published the book On Gaslighting.
