= Doris E. Abramson =

American professor and writer

Doris E. Abramson (May 6, 1925 — January 7, 2008) was an American professor, writer, editor, and bookstore proprietor in the United States. She did her dissertation at Columbia University and published a book on Black playwrights. The University of Massachusetts at Amherst has a collection of her papers.

== Life ==
Abramson grew up in Amherst and taught at the University of Massachusetts at Amherst. The school has a photo of her from ca. 1948.

She also wrote poetry.

Abramson had a partner, Dorothy Johnson, for over 45 years.

She died of cancer at her home in New Salem.

== Books ==
- Negro Playwrights in the American Theatre, 1925-1959
