= The Earth Institute =

Research institute at Columbia University

Coordinates: 40°48′27″N 73°57′43″W

- Successor: Columbia Climate School
- Founded: 1995; 31 years ago
- Founder: Peter B. de Menocal
- Location: New York City, United States
- Key people: Alex N. Halliday (director)
- Affiliations: Columbia University
- Website: earth.columbia.edu

The Earth Institute was a research institute at Columbia University created in 1995 for addressing complex issues facing the planet and its inhabitants, with a focus on sustainable development. With an interdisciplinary approach, this includes research in climate change, geology, global health, economics, management, agriculture, ecosystems, urbanization, energy, hazards, and water. The Earth Institute's activities were guided by the idea that science and technological tools that already exist could be applied to greatly improve conditions for the world's poor, while preserving the natural systems that support life on Earth.

== Former Research Units ==
In 2021, The Earth Institute was dissolved and its resources and research units were absorbed by the Columbia Climate School.

- Lamont–Doherty Earth Observatory
- Advanced Consortium on Cooperation, Conflict, and Complexity
- Center for Climate Systems Research (CCSR)
- Center for Integrated Earth System Information (CIESIN)
- Center for Sustainable Development (CSD)
- Center for Sustainable Urban Development (CSUD)
- Climate Science, Awareness and Solutions (CSAS)
- Columbia Center on Sustainable Investment (CCSI)
- Columbia Water Center (CWC)
- International Research Institute for Climate and Society (IRI)
- Lenfest Center for Sustainable Energy (LCSE)
- National Center for Disaster Preparedness (NCDP)
- Quadracci Sustainable Engineering Lab (QSEL)
- Research Program on Sustainability Policy and Management

== See also ==
- Cooperative Institute for Climate Applications and Research
- Millennium Cities Initiative
- Millennium Villages Project
- SedDB, online database for sediment geochemistry
