= Columbia Climate School =

School at Columbia University

- Motto: Climate, Earth, and Society
- Type: Private graduate and undergraduate school
- Established: 2020; 6 years ago
- Parent institution: Columbia University
- Dean: Alexis Abramson
- Postgraduates: 124 (Fall 2024)
- Location: New York City, New York, United States
- Campus: Urban
- Total Alumni: 5,000
- Website: climate.columbia.edu

The Columbia Climate School is a professional school of Columbia University, located in New York City. Its mission is to advance knowledge and train leaders in climate science, sustainability, and related fields.

Established in 2020, it is the first new school created at Columbia in 25 years. The school was formed by consolidating the university’s major climate-related research centers, including the Lamont–Doherty Earth Observatory, and by integrating the functions of the Earth Institute with Columbia’s existing Master’s program in Climate and Society.

== History ==
The origins of the Climate School trace back to The Earth Institute, founded in 1995 as an interdisciplinary research hub uniting scholars in environmental and social sciences, law, public policy, management, public health, and engineering. The Earth Institute encompassed numerous research centers, the most prominent being the Lamont–Doherty Earth Observatory, a leading Earth science institution located in Palisades, New York. Lamont–Doherty played a central role in the development of plate tectonic theory and has long served as one of Columbia’s major research engines.

The academic foundation for the school emerged in 2004 with the creation of the Master of Arts in Climate and Society, developed by renowned Columbia climate scientist Mark Cane and originally administered by the Graduate School of Arts and Sciences. This became the first degree formally housed within the Climate School upon its establishment in 2020 as serves as the school's flagship academic program.

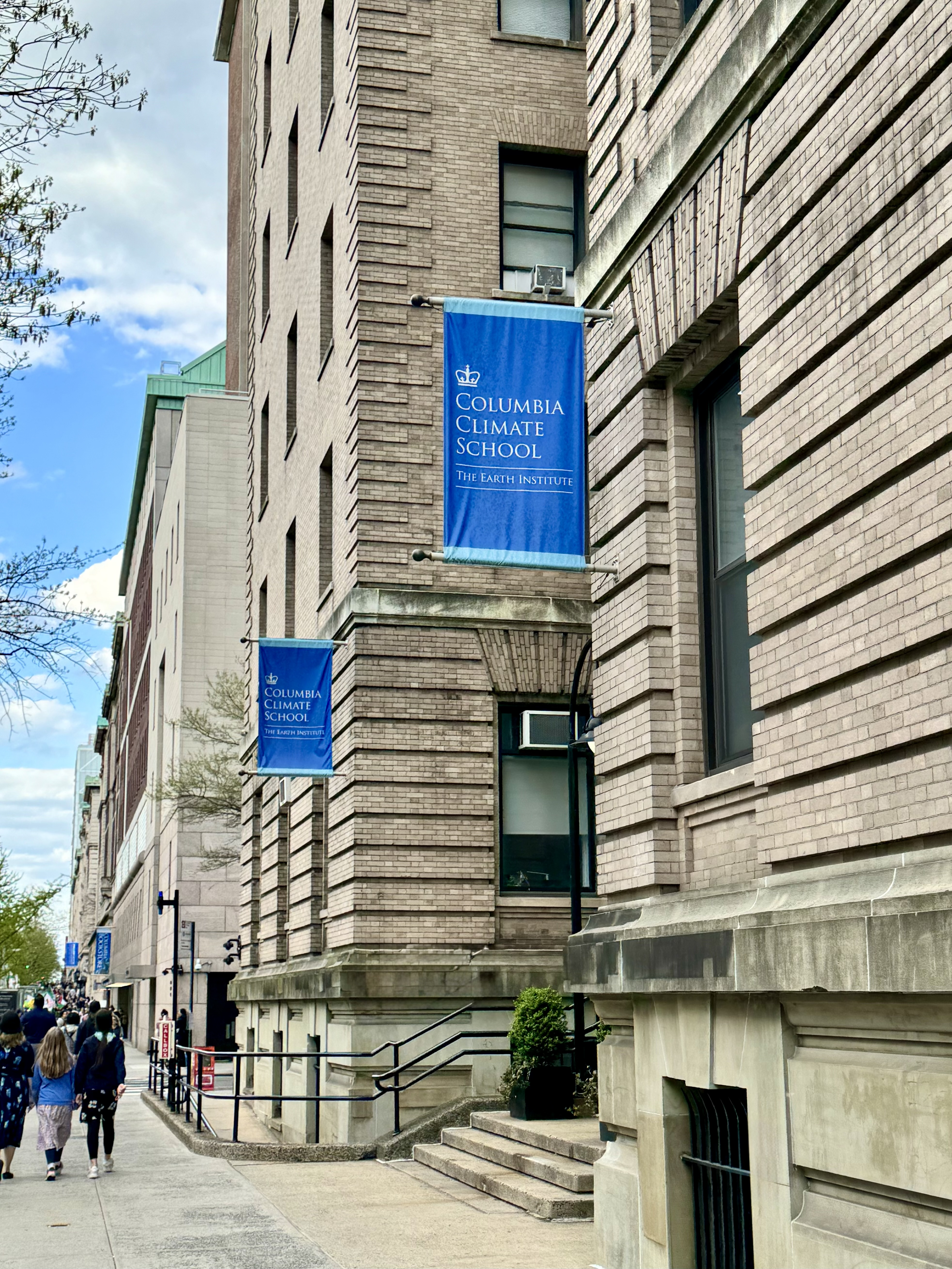
Hogan Hall, the main academic and administrative building for the Columbia Climate School.

Columbia University officially announced the creation of the Climate School in July 2020. President Lee C. Bollinger presented the plan at a United Nations meeting, framing the initiative in response to the accelerating impacts of climate change and the growing global demand for climate knowledge. By establishing a dedicated school, Columbia elevated climate-focused research and education to the same institutional standing as its longstanding professional schools in Law, Business, Journalism, and Medicine.

In February 2024, Columbia University launched the school’s second academic program, the Master of Science in Climate. In February 2025, it introduced a third program, the Master of Science in Climate Finance. The Climate Finance degree is described as the first program of its kind in the United States, combining coursework in climate science and corporate finance to address the global challenges posed by climate change.

== Academic Programs ==
The Climate School offers undergraduate and graduate degrees, as well as joint and dual-degree programs across Columbia University.

As of 2025, the school offers three graduate programs:

1. MA in Climate and Society
2. MS in Climate
3. MS in Climate Finance

The undergraduate offerings include majors in Climate and Sustainability and Sustainable Development, along with a minor and concentration in Sustainable Development.

The Climate School also collaborates with other Columbia University schools to provide several partner degrees. These include programs with the School of International and Public Affairs, such as the MPA in Environmental Science and Policy, the MPA in Development Practice, and the PhD in Sustainable Development; and programs with the School of Professional Studies, including the MS in Sustainability Management and MS in Sustainability Science.

Additionally, the School offers dual-degree options, such as the MS in Climate paired with the MS in Carbon Management through the Fu Foundation School of Engineering and Applied Science, and the MS in Climate paired with the MS in Architecture and Urban Design through the Graduate School of Architecture, Planning, and Preservation.

== Research Units ==
Columbia Climate School has over 25 transdisciplinary research units, institutes, partners, and affiliates. This includes the following 14 dedicated research units that were absorbed from The Earth Institute.

=== Lamont–Doherty Earth Observatory (Lamont) ===
The Lamont-Doherty Earth Observatory is a research institution specializing in the Earth science and climate change. Though part of the Climate School it is located on a separate closed campus in Palisades, New York. The observatory was one of the centers of research that led to the development of the theory of plate tectonics as well as many other notable scientific developments.

=== Advanced Consortium on Cooperation, Conflict, and Complexity (AC^{4}) ===
AC^{4} is a research initiative within the Columbia Climate School dedicated to studying the drivers of peace, conflict, and sustainable development. AC4 supports interdisciplinary research and practice on topics such as conflict resolution, climate-related conflict, peacebuilding, and social–ecological systems. The consortium collaborates with scholars, practitioners, and global institutions to develop evidence-based approaches for fostering cooperation and resilient communities.

=== Center for Climate Systems Research (CCSR) ===
Established in 1994, the Center for Climate Systems Research is a key Earth Institute center that has 25+ scientists and staff researching the Earth's climate. As Columbia's Gateway to NASA and Beyond, the center has a special relationship with the NASA Goddard Institute for Space Studies, as it is co-located with GISS in Columbia University's Armstrong Hall above Tom's Restaurant in New York City. Here, Columbia and NASA scientists jointly work together to gain a greater understanding of climate sensitivity and variability including the forcing and feedback mechanisms that influence climate, particularly with regard to how this can impact humanity and environmental stability.

=== Center for Integrated Earth System Information (CIESIN) ===
The Center for International Earth Science Information Network was established in 1989 as an independent NGO to research the interaction between man and the environment. In 1998, CIESIN became part of the Columbia University Earth Institute. Offices are located at the Lamont–Doherty Earth Observatory in Palisades, New York. CIESIN provides a large amount of data and information about the Earth to meet the needs of both scientists and decision makers by means of education, consultation, and training. The center is focused on applying modern information technology towards many research problems to meet this goal. Specifically CIESIN was one of the first groups that developed and provided interactive Informatics tools using the internet.

=== Center for Sustainable Development (CSD) ===
The Center for Sustainable Development is charged with managing social science activities. The mission of CGSD is to apply social science approaches to international development problems. The center collaborates with the faculty of the social science departments of Columbia University and is primarily focused on interdisciplinary research and policy application.

=== Center for Sustainable Urban Development (CSUD) ===
The Center for Sustainable Urban Development was established in 2004 by the Volvo Research and Education Foundations and seeks the creation of sustainable cities, both physically and socially. The center's first project was to develop land use and transport planning in developing countries that promote sustainable growth.

=== Climate Science, Awareness and Solutions (CSAS) ===
Climate Science, Awareness and Solutions is a research program within the Columbia Climate School focused on advancing scientific understanding of climate change and communicating its implications to policymakers and the public. Founded and led by climate scientist James Hansen, the program conducts research on climate modeling, energy systems, climate impacts, and policy pathways to limit global warming. CSAS also engages in public outreach aimed at promoting evidence-based climate solutions.

=== Columbia Center on Sustainable Investment (CCSI) ===
The Columbia Center on Sustainable Investment is a joint research center of Columbia Law School and the Climate School. It focuses on sustainable international investment, conducting applied research and policy work on issues such as investment law, natural resource management, climate change, and land governance. The center works with governments, companies, and civil society to promote investment practices that support sustainable development.

=== Columbia Water Center (CWC) ===
The Columbia Water Center was founded in 2008 and is looking into the assessment, understanding and resolution of the global crisis of water scarcity. The center aims to design reliable, sustainable models of water management and development that can be implemented on local, regional and global levels. The Columbia Water Center conducts projects both domestically and internationally, with projects currently underway in India, Mali, Brazil, and China.

=== International Research Institute for Climate and Society (IRI) ===
The International Research Institute for Climate and Society was established in 1996 and became part of the Earth Institute in 2005. The IRI's mission is to enhance society's capability to understand, anticipate and manage the impacts of climate in order to improve human welfare and the environment, especially in developing countries. (see Effects of global warming) The IRI conducts this mission through strategic and applied research, education, capacity building, and by providing forecasts and information products, with an emphasis on practical and verifiable utility and partnership. The institute was directed by Lisa Goddard who led efforts to forecast climate change.

=== Lenfest Center for Sustainable Energy (LCSE) ===
Lenfast is a research center within the Columbia Climate School dedicated to advancing technologies and strategies for low-carbon and sustainable energy systems. The center focuses on areas such as advanced fuel concepts, carbon sequestration, and small scale energy conversion systems (e.g., Fischer–Tropsch process). LCSE works with academic, industry, and government partners to develop practical solutions that support the transition to a cleaner global energy economy.

=== National Center for Disaster Preparedness (NCDP) ===
The National Center for Disaster Preparedness is a research and policy center within the Columbia Climate School focused on improving disaster readiness, response, and recovery. The center conducts research on public health preparedness, community resilience, child-focused disaster impacts, and emergency management policy. NCDP works with government agencies, nonprofits, and communities to develop evidence-based strategies that strengthen national and local disaster preparedness capacities.

=== Quadracci Sustainable Engineering Lab (QSEL) ===
The Quadracci Sustainable Engineering Lab (QSEL) is a research group within the Columbia Climate School focused on developing engineering solutions that support sustainable energy systems and urban infrastructure. The lab works on data-driven approaches to energy efficiency, building performance, power systems, and sustainable development, with projects spanning both local and global contexts. QSEL integrates engineering, analytics, and policy to inform technologies and strategies that reduce environmental impact and improve resource management.

=== Research Program on Sustainability Policy and Management ===
The Columbia Research Program on Sustainability Policy and Management is an interdisciplinary initiative within the Columbia Climate School that focuses on developing data-driven tools and frameworks to measure, manage, and improve organizational sustainability performance. The program conducts research at the intersection of environmental policy, management science, and sustainability metrics, working with public, private, and nonprofit partners to inform evidence-based decision-making and advance best practices in sustainability governance.

== Recent Events ==
In 2025, the Department of Government Efficiency (DOGE), announced the termination of a contract for "nonpersonal services to complete manuscript presenting updated pCO2 climatology" from Columbia's Climate School, for the NOAA Global Monitoring Laboratory (GML). According to HigherGov, this contract was for Columbia University to do "monitoring, quality control, analysis, and presentation of ocean partial pressure of carbon dioxide (pCO2) observations collected as part of the NOAA Surface water pCO2 measurements from ships program". This contract started on June 30, 2022, and was originally set to end on June 30, 2025, before DOGE's termination on March 7, 2025.

In February 2026 the school journal "State of the Planet" published an article about the Open Coalition on Compliance Carbon Markets, saying it can take money from the polluting industries and give it to projects which are good for climate but lack finance.
