= Michael L. McFrazier =

American academic administrator

Michael L. McFrazier is an American academic administrator serving as a professor and dean of the Whitlowe R. Green College of Education at Prairie View A&M University since 2019.

== Life ==
McFrazier attended Paris Junior College. At Baylor University, McFrazier earned a bachelor's degree in music and master's degrees in music performance and educational leadership and administration. He completed an Ed.D. in educational leadership and administration from the University of Arkansas.

McFrazier was a public school teacher and administrator in the Waco Independent School District. In 1998, he joined the faculty at Prairie View A&M University. In 2019, he became a professor and dean of the Whitlowe R. Green College of Education after serving in the role in an acting capacity. From March 1 to May 31, 2023, he served as the acting president, following Ruth Simmons' resignation. McFrazier was succeeded by Tomikia P. LeGrande. In July 2023, he became the interim provost and senior vice president for academic affairs.
