= Colonial Revival architecture =

American architectural style

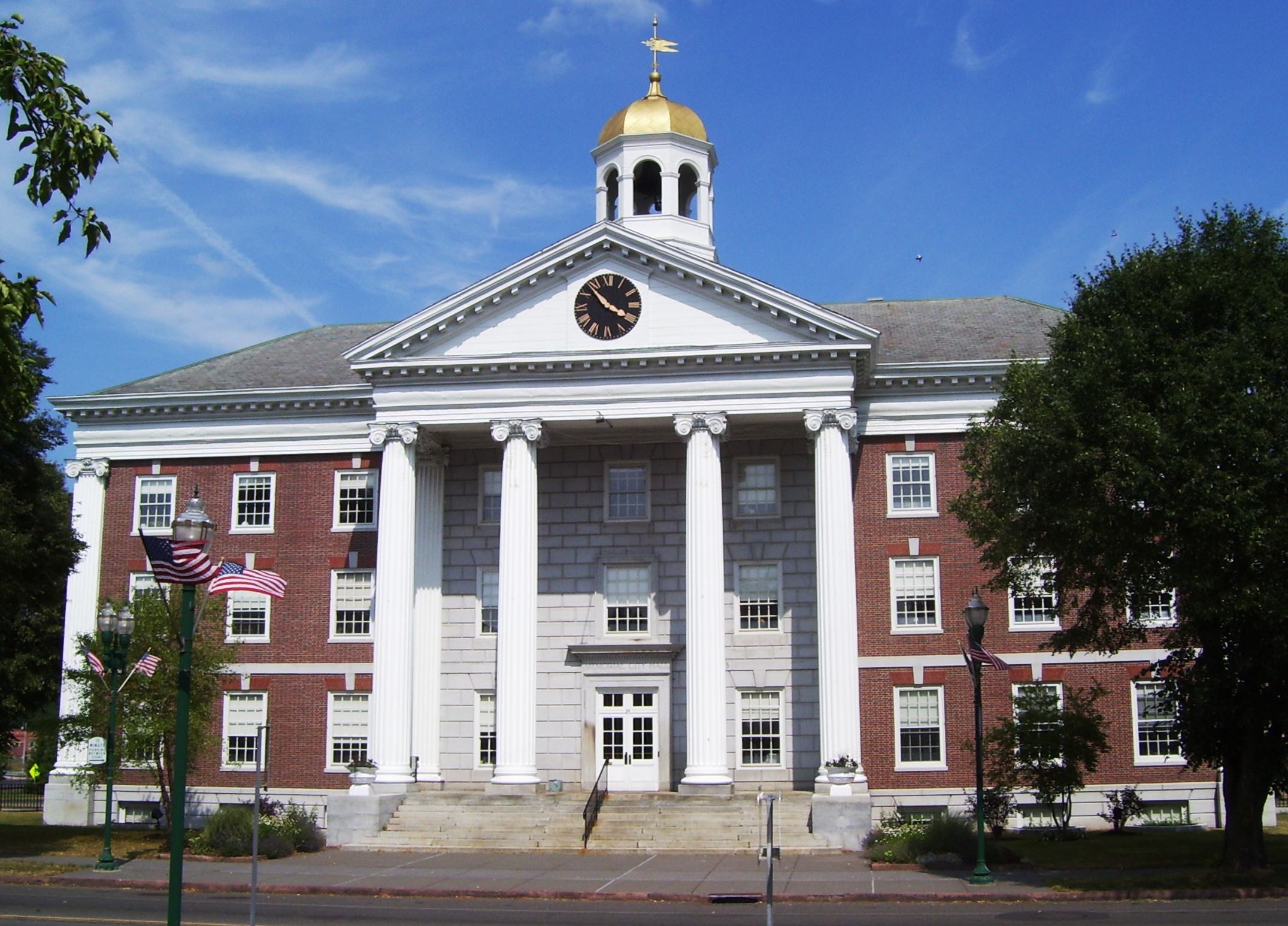
Memorial City Hall in Auburn, New York, built between 1929 and 1930 in the Colonial Revival style

The Colonial Revival architectural style seeks to revive elements of American colonial architecture.

The beginnings of the Colonial Revival style are often attributed to the Centennial Exhibition of 1876, which reawakened Americans to the architectural traditions of their colonial past. Fairly small numbers of Colonial Revival homes were built c. 1880–1910, a period when Queen Anne-style architecture was dominant in the United States. From 1910–1930, the Colonial Revival movement was ascendant, with about 40% of U.S. homes built in the Colonial Revival style. In the immediate post-war period (c. 1950s–early 1960s), Colonial Revival homes continued to be constructed, but in simplified form. In the present day, many New Traditional homes draw from Colonial Revival styles.

Although associated with the architectural movement, "Colonial Revival" also refers to historic preservation, landscape architecture and garden design, and decorative arts movements that emulate or draw inspiration from colonial forms.

== Characteristics ==
While the dominant influences in Colonial Revival style are Georgian and Federal architecture, Colonial Revival homes also draw, to a lesser extent, from the Dutch Colonial style and post-medieval English styles. Colonial Revival homes are often eclectic in style, combining aspects from several of these previous styles.

Since Colonial Revival architecture pulls structural and decorative elements from other styles, there is not one single combination of elements that defines the style. However, some commonly found characteristics of Colonial Revival buildings include:

- Gabled, hipped, or gambrel roofs
- Broken pediments
- Symmetrical facades
- Double hung windows and shutters
- Fanlights and sidelights

Cyril M. Harris's American Architecture: An Illustrated Book noted that "Colonial Revival houses are usually the result of a rather free interpretation of their prototypes; they tend to be larger, may differ significantly from the houses they seek to emulate, and often exaggerate architectural details."

== Gallery ==
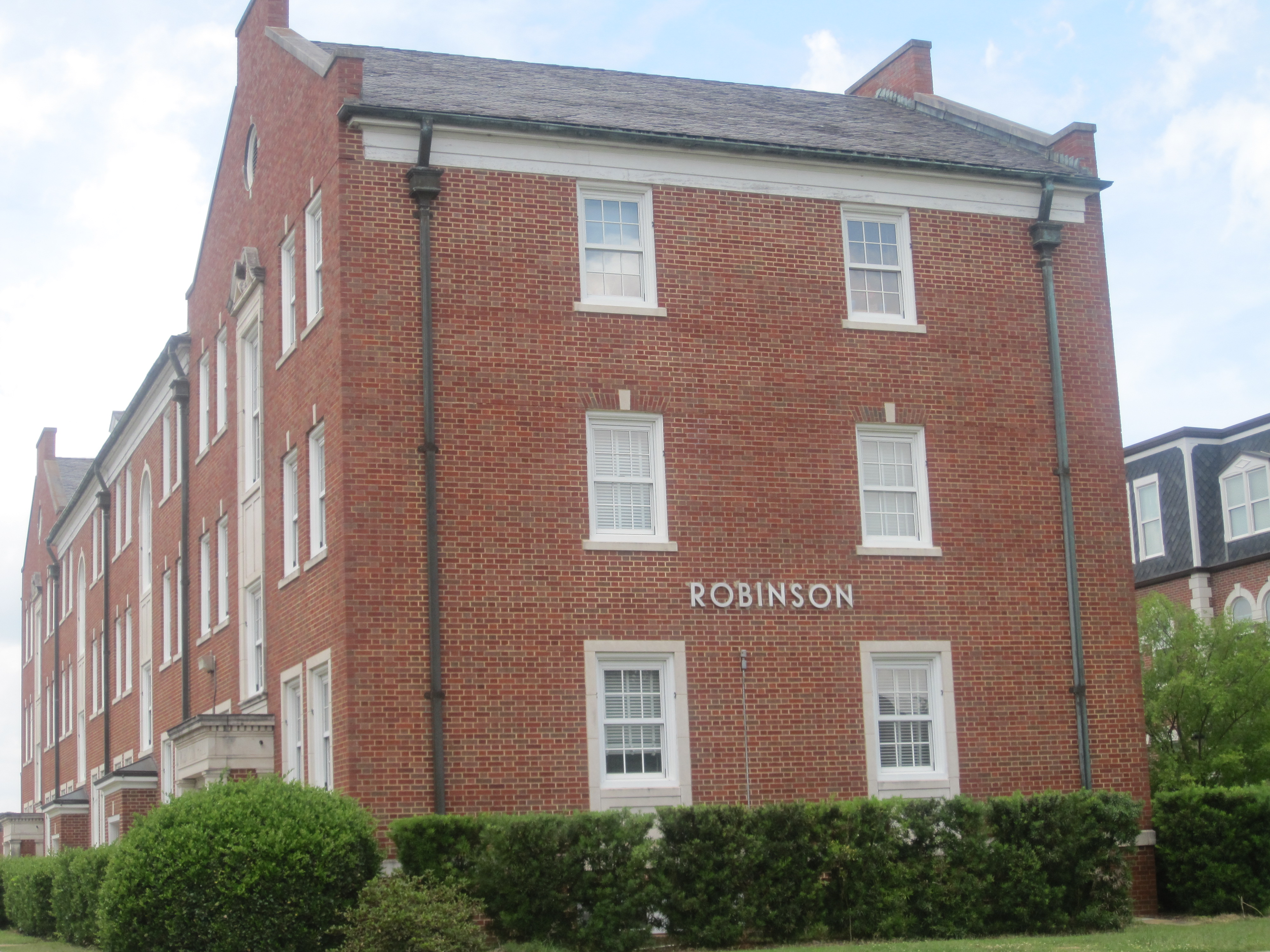
Historic Robinson Hall on the Louisiana Tech University campus in Ruston, Louisiana, is named for the second president of the institution, William Claiborne Robinson.

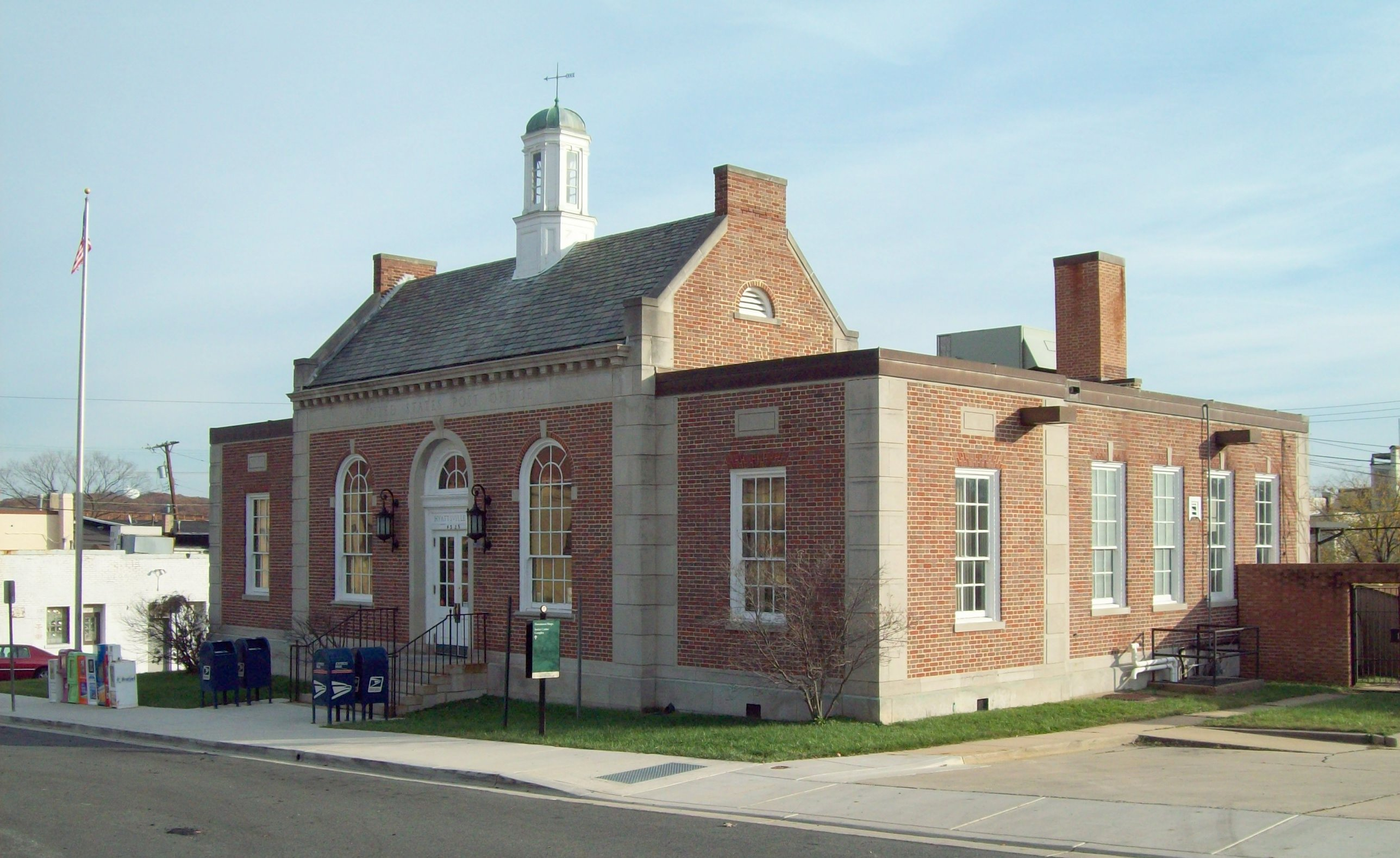
Hyattsville Post Office in Hyattsville, Maryland, built in 1935

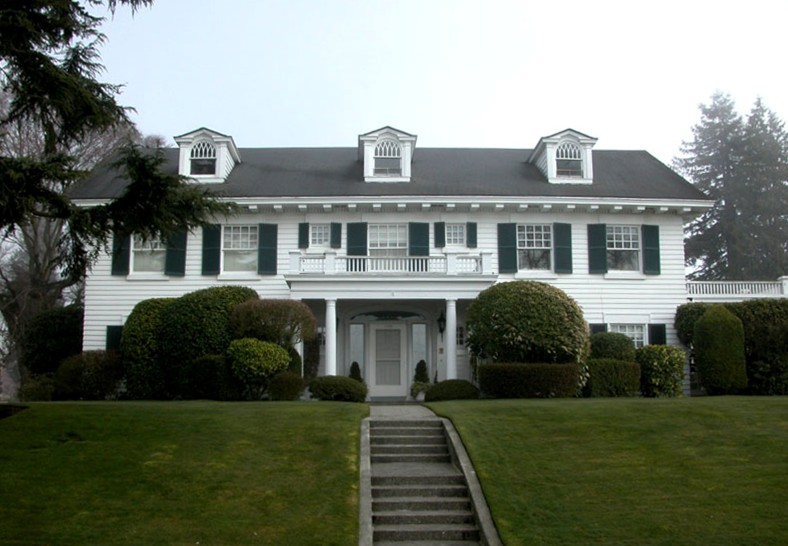
Colonial Revival home of Henry M. Jackson in Everett, Washington

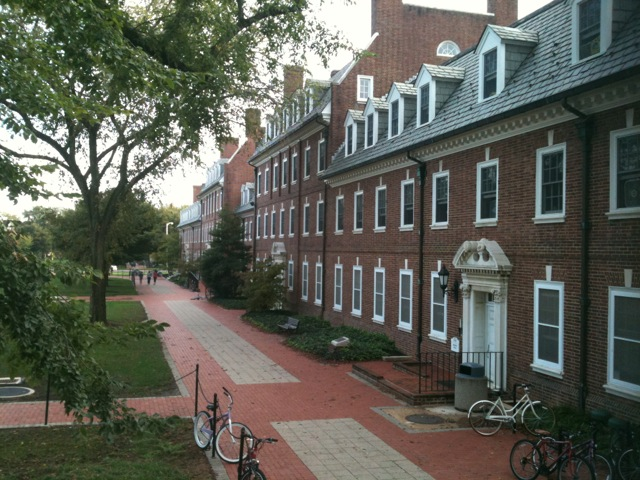
Brown and Sypherd Residence Halls, University of Delaware. Much of the central campus is built in Colonial Revival style.

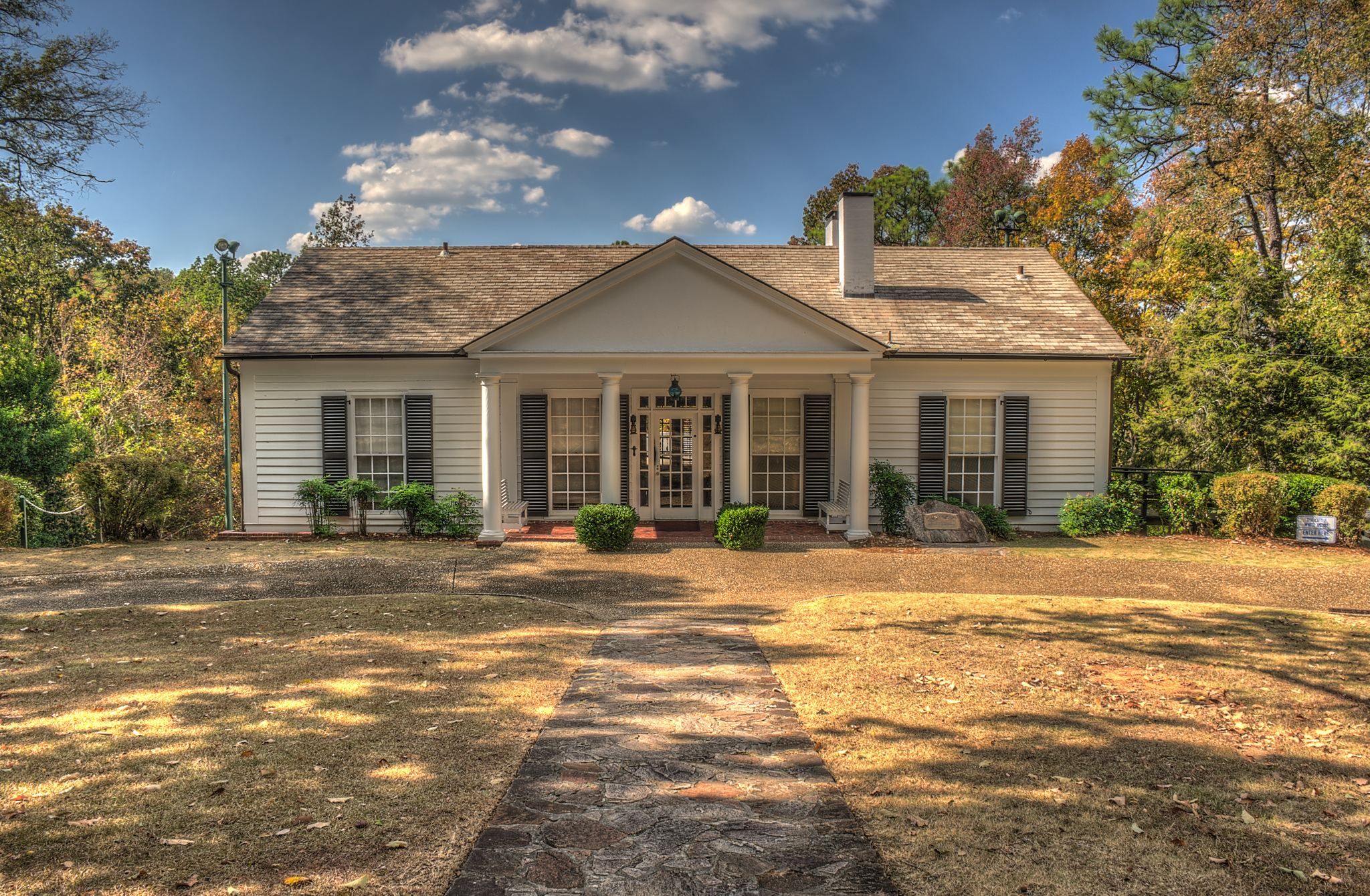
The Little White House, Franklin D. Roosevelt's personal retreat near Warm Springs, Georgia

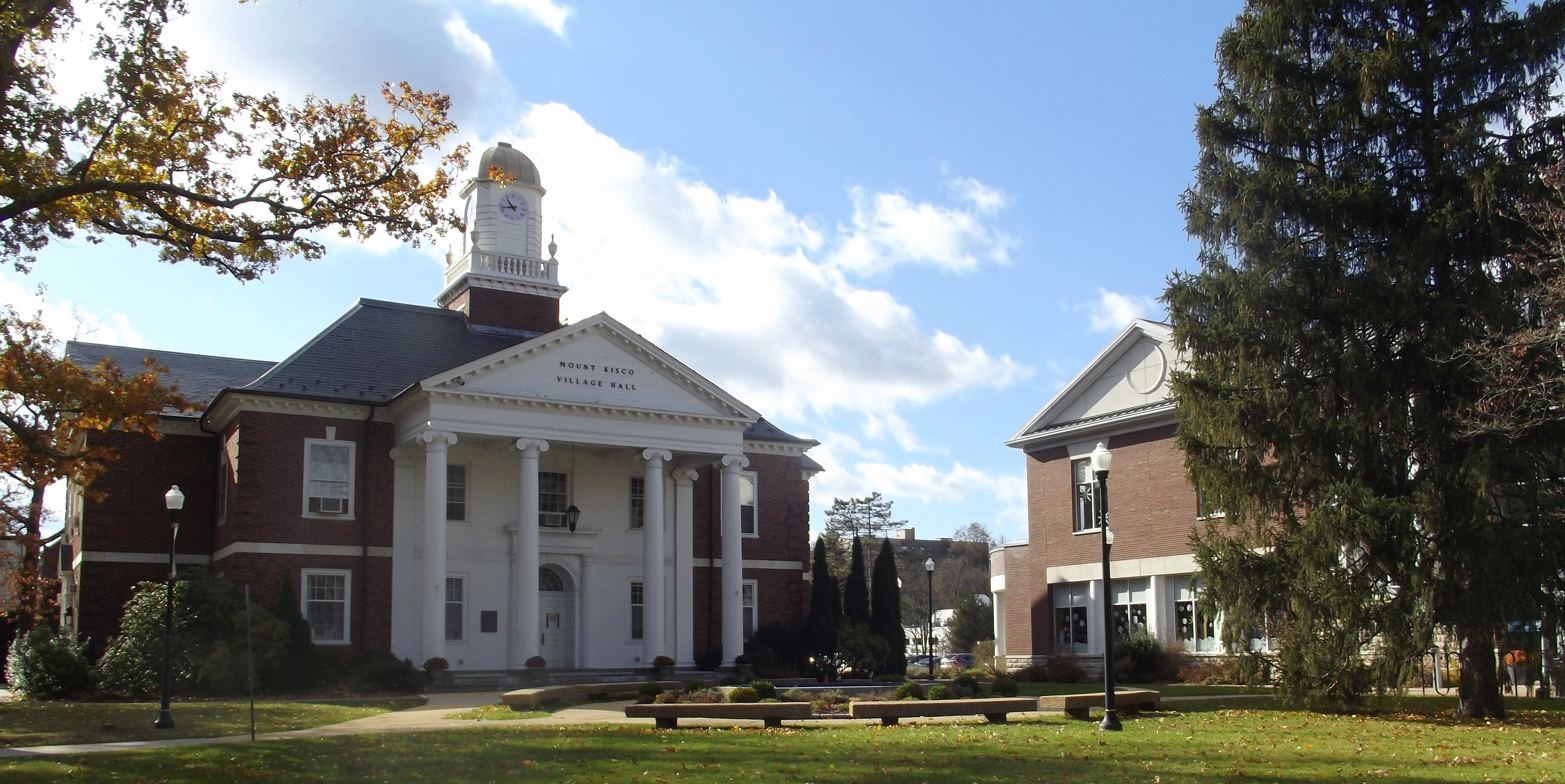
Mount Kisco Village Hall

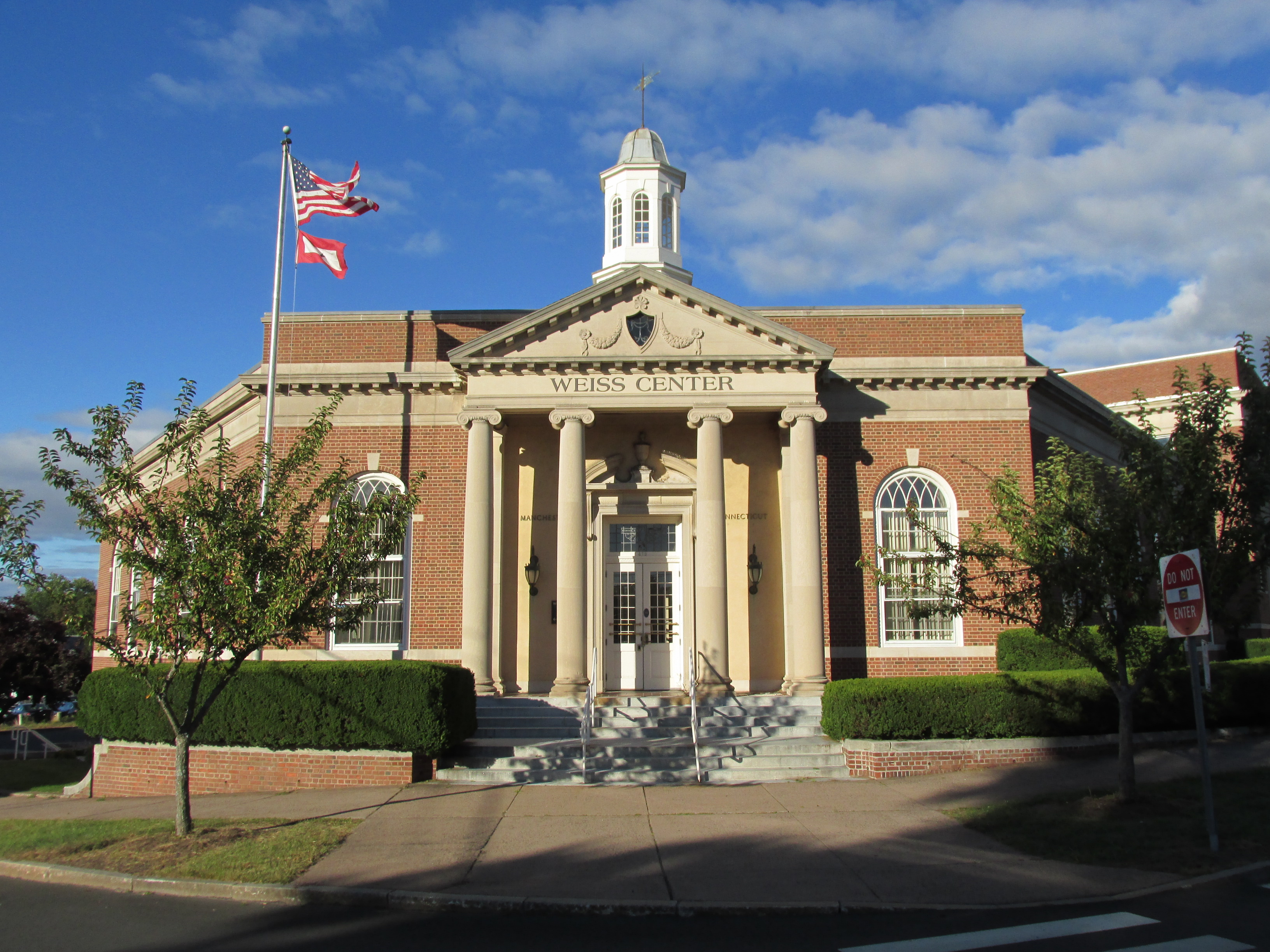
Weiss Center, a town-owned facility in Manchester, Connecticut, was a former post office. It is made of brick with limestone trim and contains a portico.

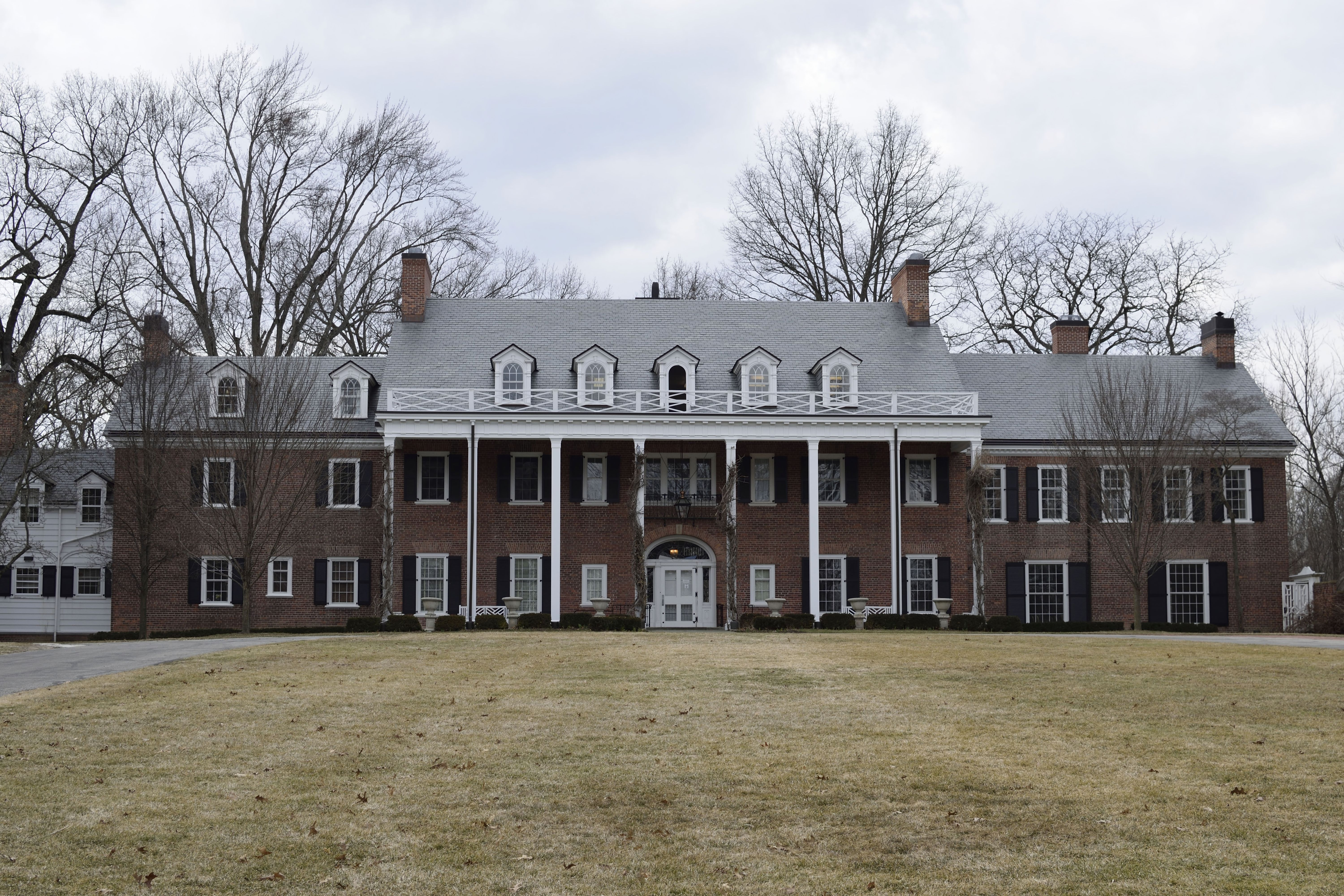
The Robert Stranahan residence in Toledo, Ohio, now a part of Wildwood Preserve Metropark

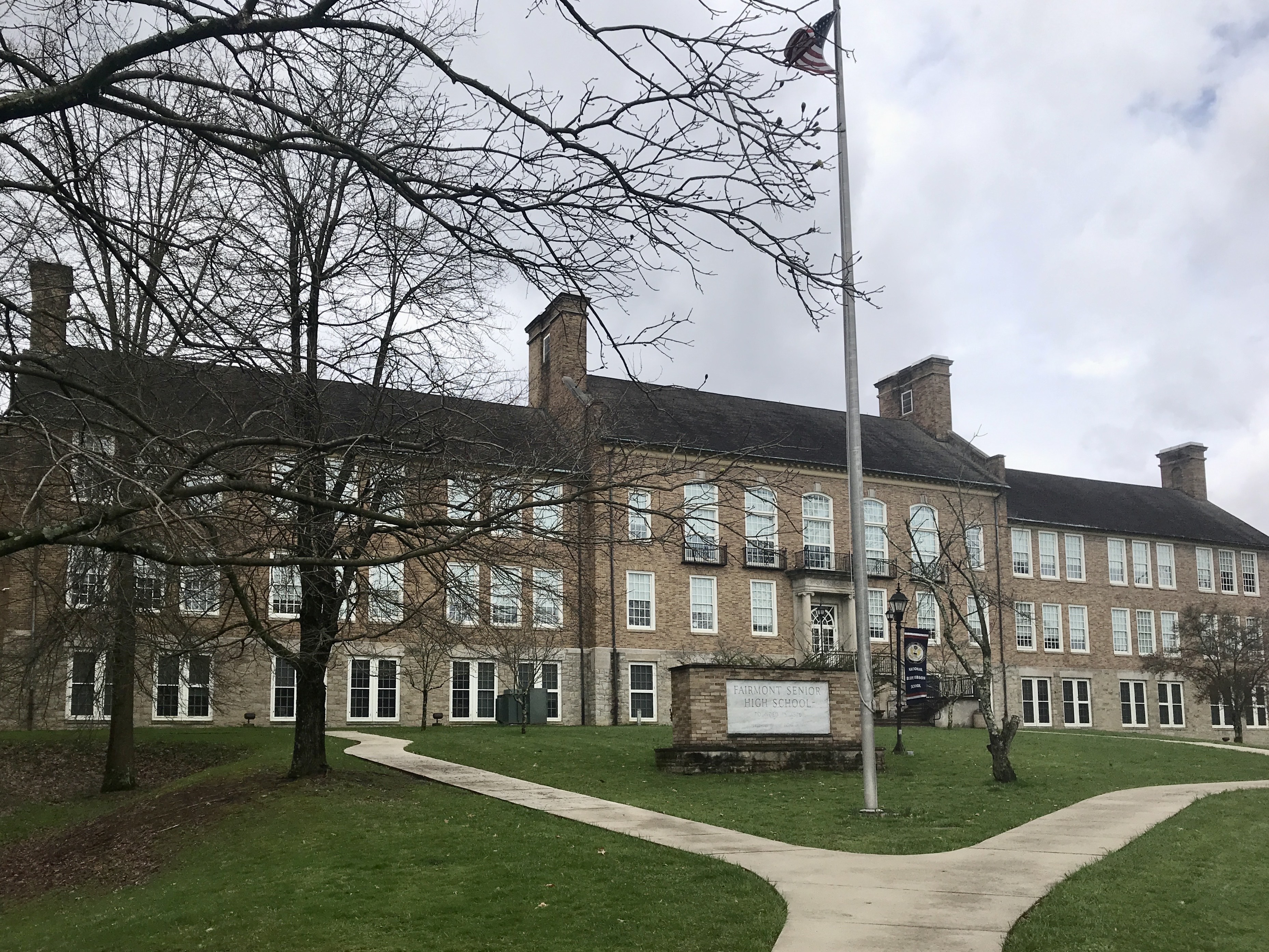
Fairmont Senior High School, a public secondary school in Fairmont, West Virginia

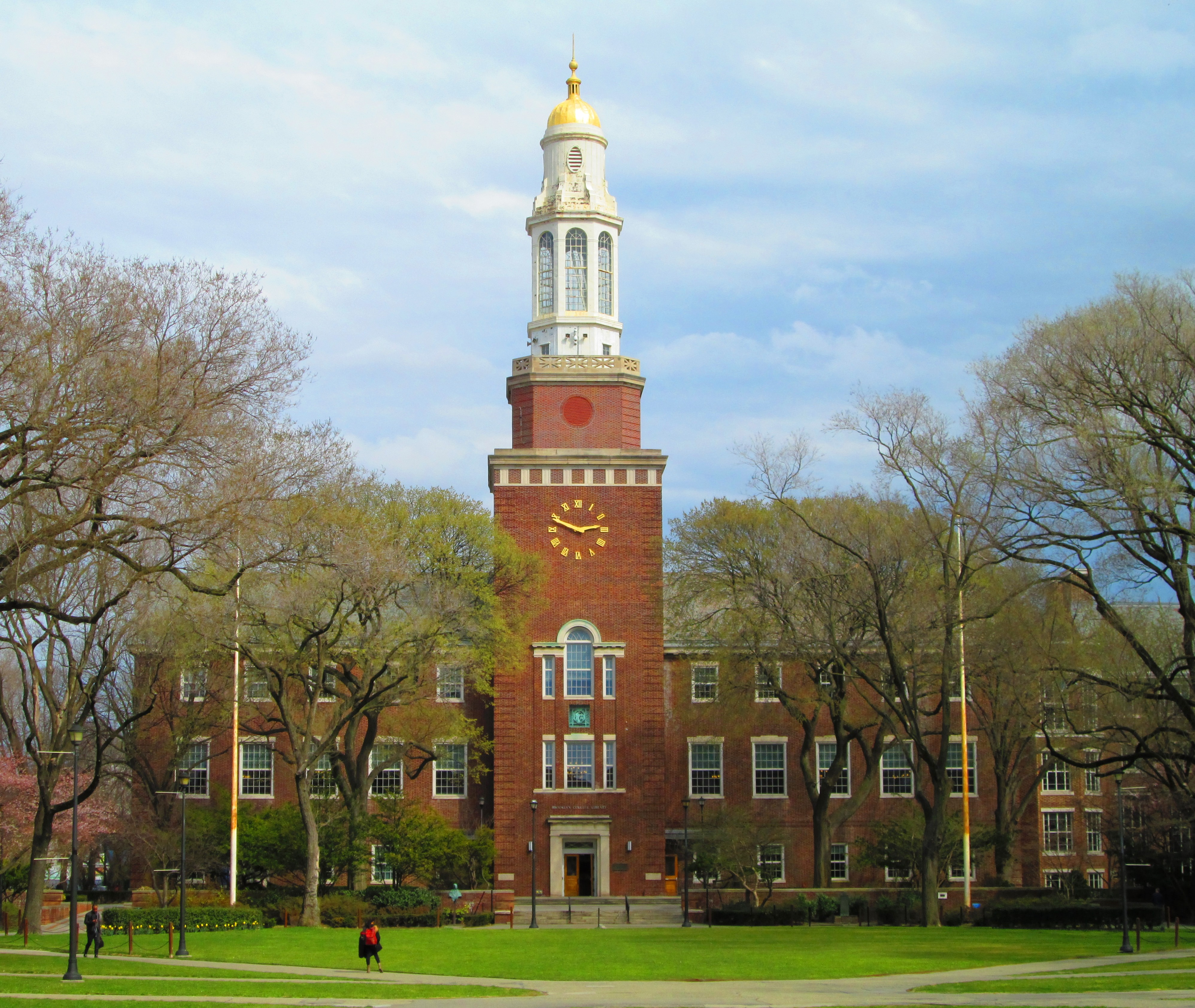
The Brooklyn College Library, designed by architect Randolph Evans

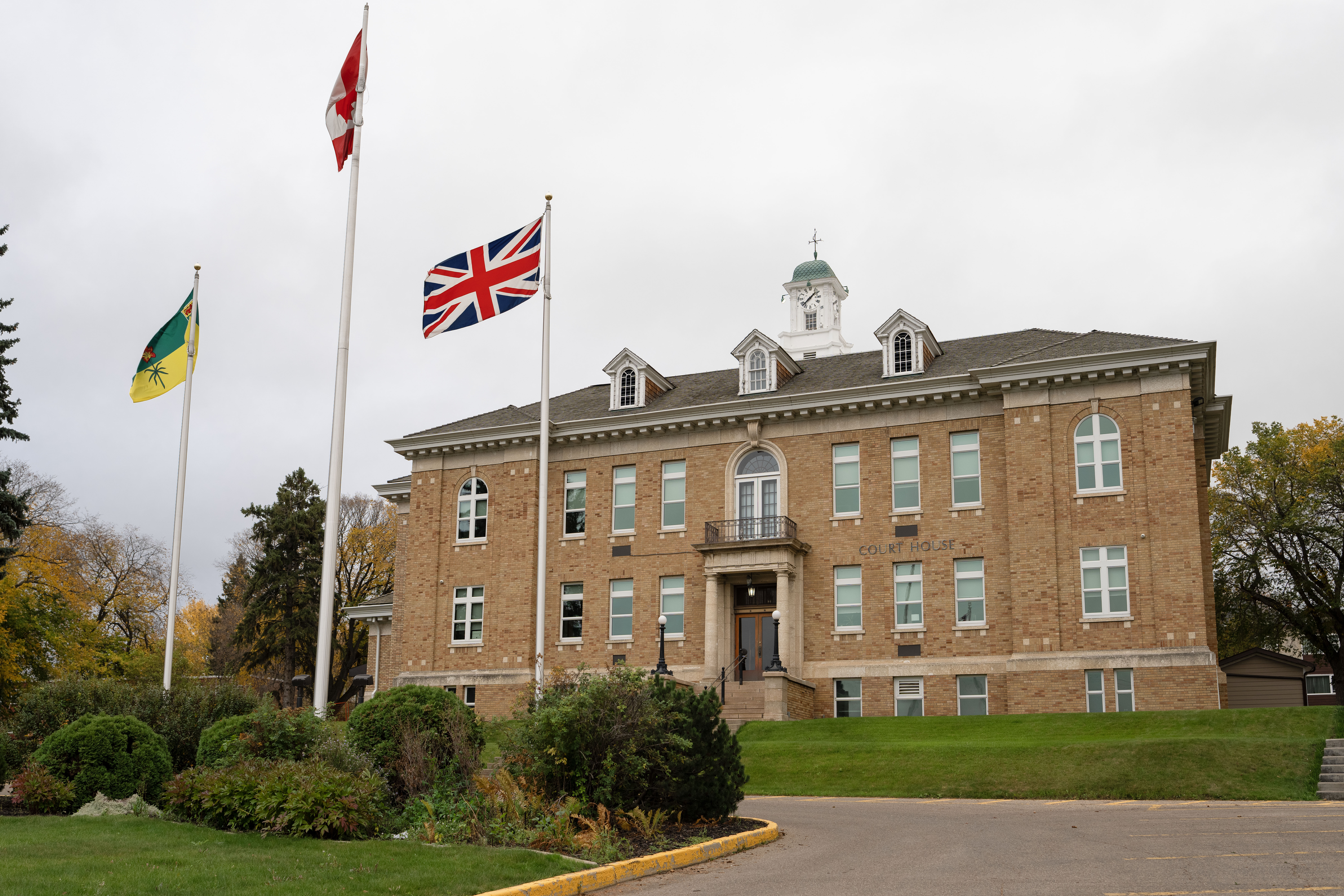
Prince Albert Courthouse, built in 1927

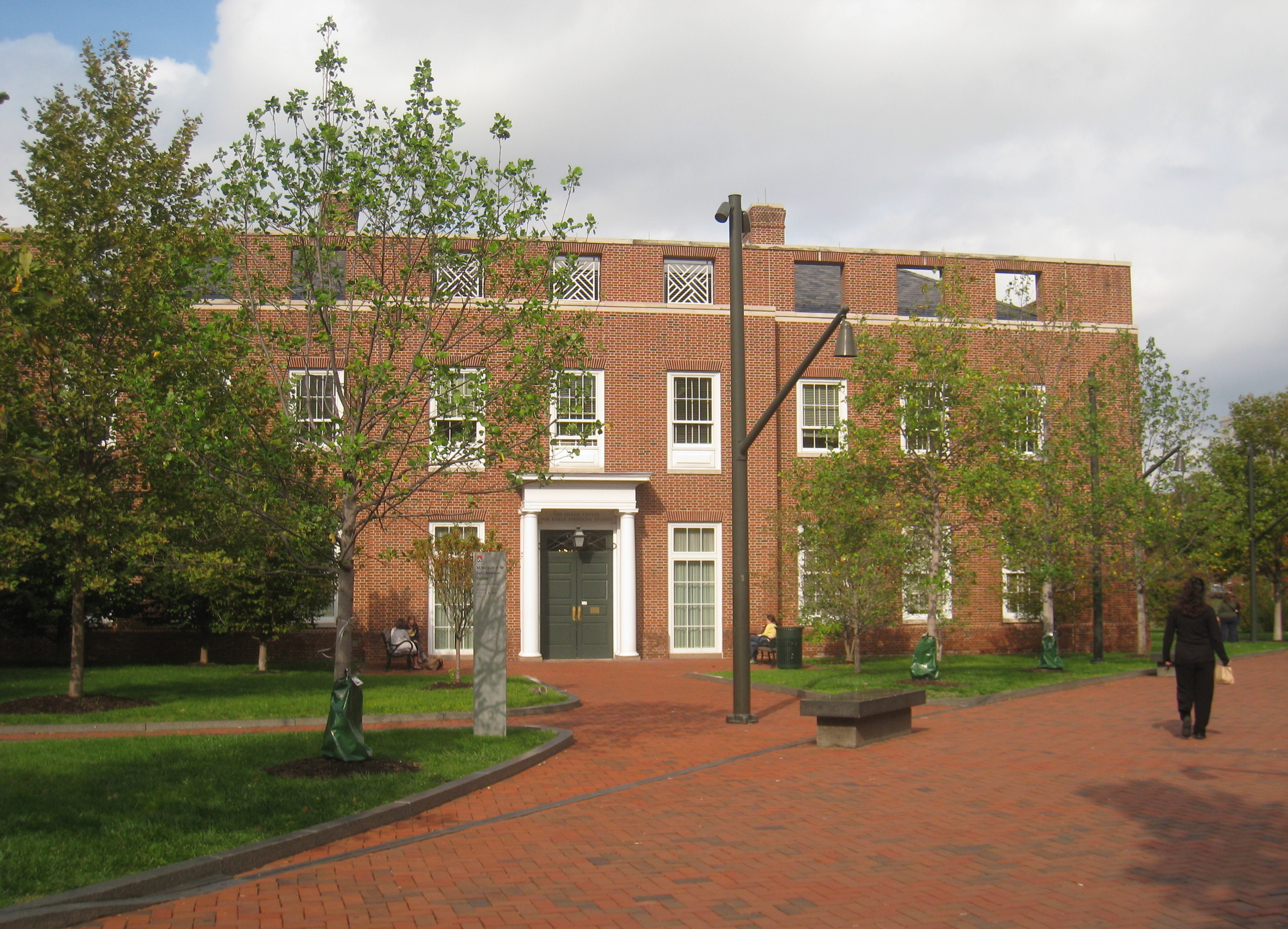
The McNeil Center for Early American Studies, at the University of Pennsylvania, named for Robert L. McNeil, Jr.

== See also ==
- Colonial Revival garden
- Dutch Colonial Revival architecture
- Mission Revival Style architecture
- New Classical architecture
- Spanish Colonial Revival architecture
- Wallace Nutting
- Colonial Williamsburg
