= Elizabeth N. Ellis =

Historian

Academic background
- Education: Tulane University (BA); University of North Carolina at Chapel Hill (PhD)

Academic work
- Discipline: History
- Sub-discipline: Indigenous history of the Americas, early North American history
- Institutions: New York University; Princeton University
- Notable works: The Great Power of Small Nations: Indigenous Diplomacy in the Gulf South (2022)

Elizabeth N. Ellis is an American historian whose research focuses Indigenous politics, diplomacy, and migration in early North America. She is an associate professor of history at Princeton University and an enrolled citizen of the Peoria Tribe of Indians of Oklahoma. Her book The Great Power of Small Nations: Indigenous Diplomacy in the Gulf South (2022) examines the roles of smaller Native American nations in the colonial history of the Lower Mississippi Valley. Ellis was named a MacArthur Fellow in 2026.

== Education and academic career ==
Ellis received a bachelor's degree from Tulane University in 2010 and a doctorate from the University of North Carolina at Chapel Hill in 2015. She held a postdoctoral fellowship at the McNeil Center for Early American Studies at the University of Pennsylvania from 2015 to 2017. She subsequently taught history at New York University, where she was also co-director of the Native Studies Forum, from 2017 to 2022. She joined Princeton's history department in 2022.

Ellis is Peewaalia and a citizen of the Peoria Tribe of Indians of Oklahoma. Her work with members of the Pointe-au-Chien Indian Tribe while studying at Tulane contributed to her interest in the history and political status of Native nations in the Gulf South.

== Research ==
Ellis studies Indigenous nationhood and the political relationships among Native communities and European colonial powers. Her first book, The Great Power of Small Nations: Indigenous Diplomacy in the Gulf South, was published by the University of Pennsylvania Press in 2022. It examines small Native nations in the seventeenth- and eighteenth-century Lower Mississippi Valley, including the Biloxi, Chitimacha, Houma, and Tunica peoples. Ellis argues that migration, the acceptance of refugees, and alliances among settlements helped these communities retain political influence while confronting European colonization.

The book was reviewed in several academic journals. In the Journal of American History, Christian Pinnen described it as an important contribution to understanding Indigenous influence in the Lower Mississippi Valley. Robert B. Caldwell Jr., writing in the American Historical Review, discussed its account of smaller Native polities and their relationships with larger nations and European colonists. Michael A. McDonnell reviewed the book in Diplomatic History, emphasizing its treatment of the region's Indigenous diplomatic history.

Ellis has also participated in research involving early Native American images and historical records. These include the Reclaiming Stories Project, which examines historical deer-hide paintings in collaboration with Peoria and Miami communities and museum collections. She has researched the history of the Peoria Tribe and Indigenous iconography.

== Awards and recognition ==
The Great Power of Small Nations received the Native American and Indigenous Studies Association's Best First Book Prize and the Summerlee Book Prize in 2023. It also received an honorable mention for the Organization of American Historians' Frederick Jackson Turner Award that year. In 2024, the Louisiana Endowment for the Humanities named it Humanities Book of the Year, and Ellis received the James H. Broussard First Book Prize from the Society for Historians of the Early American Republic.

In September 2026, Ellis was one of 20 recipients of a MacArthur Fellowship. The foundation cited her research on the political strategies and conceptions of sovereignty of smaller Indigenous nations in early North America.

== Selected publications ==
- Ellis, Elizabeth N. (2022). The Great Power of Small Nations: Indigenous Diplomacy in the Gulf South. University of Pennsylvania Press. ISBN 9781512823097.
- Ellis, Elizabeth N. (2026). "'Just keep in mind, America does have history': Challenges and Collaborative Methods for Native American History". Journal of American History. 113 (1): 107–127.
