= United States Post Office–Hyattsville Main =

- US Post Office--Hyattsville Main
- U.S. National Register of Historic Places
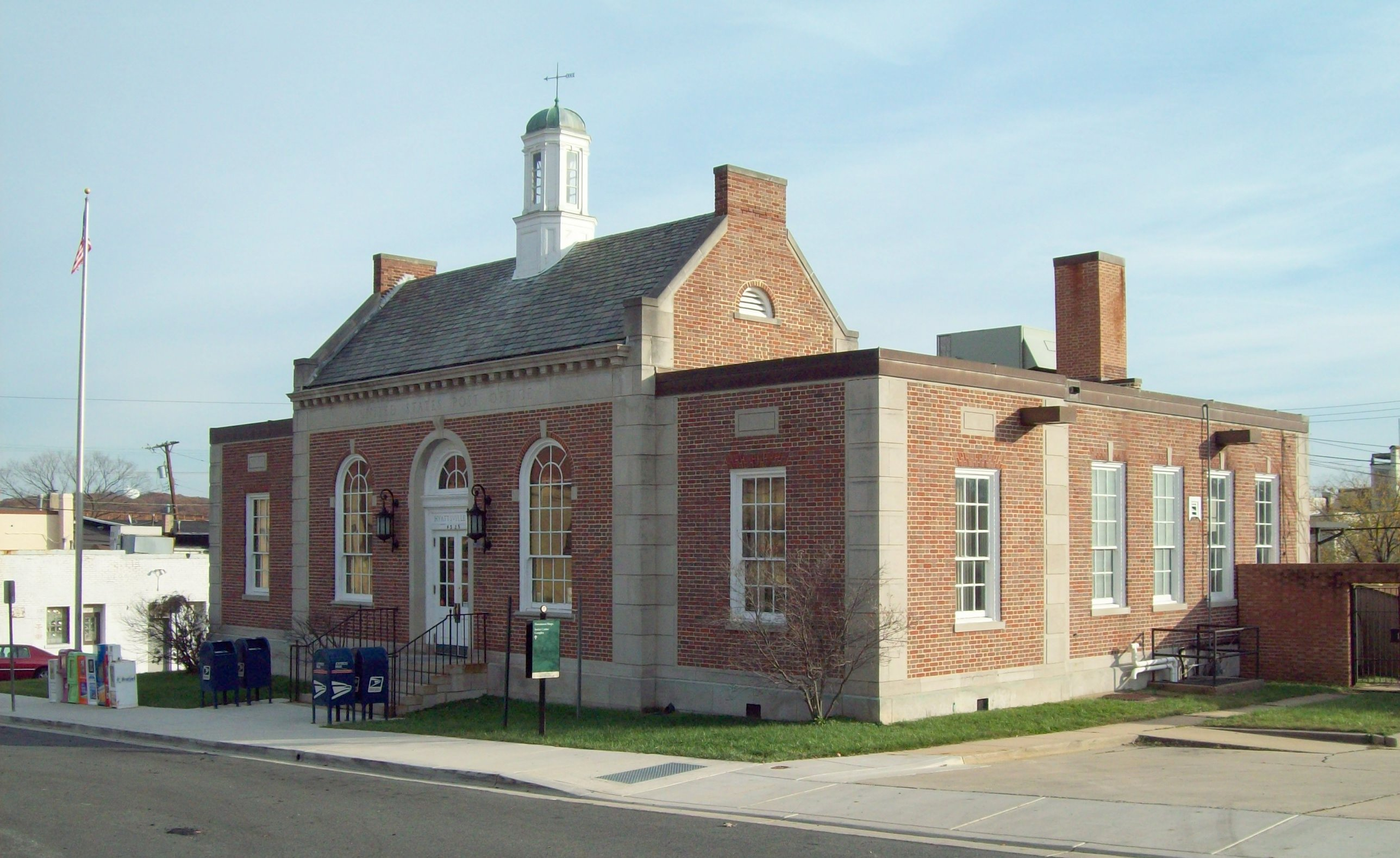
- Hyattsville Post Office November 2008

- Location within Maryland Location within the United States
- Interactive map showing the location of the U.S. Post Office-Hyattsville Main
- Location: 4325 Gallatin St., Hyattsville, Maryland
- Coordinates: 38°57′10″N 76°56′29″W
- Built: 1935
- Architect: Simon, Louis A.
- Architectural style: Colonial Revival
- NRHP reference No.: 86001906
- Added to NRHP: July 24, 1986

The Hyattsville Post Office is a one-story brick building constructed over a full basement, located on Gallatin Street in Hyattsville, Prince George's County, Maryland. The Colonial Revival building consists of a central, three-bay block flanked by smaller one-bay flat-roofed pavilions. It was constructed in 1935 and remains in active use. Murals by Eugene Kingman, depicting the agricultural heritage of Prince George's County, decorate the lobby. Its design reflects the attention Hyattsville resident and Fourth Assistant Postmaster General Smith W. Purdum paid to its construction.

It was listed on the National Register of Historic Places in 1986.
