= Richard Slator Dunn =

American historian (1928–2022)

- Born: August 9, 1928; Minneapolis, Minnesota, U.S.
- Died: January 24, 2022 (aged 93)
- Education: Harvard University (BA); Princeton University (MA); Princeton University (PhD)
- Occupations: Author; historian
- Spouse: Mary Maples Dunn
- Children: 2

Richard Slator Dunn (August 9, 1928 – January 24, 2022) was an American author and historian.

== Biography ==
Richard Slator Dunn was born in Minneapolis, Minnesota on August 9, 1928. He completed his B.A. in 1950 at Harvard College, his M.A. in 1952 and his Ph.D. in history in 1955, both degrees from Princeton University. He became a member of Phi Beta Kappa in 1950, upon the completion of his undergraduate degree. Upon retirement from his position at the University of Pennsylvania in 1996, he was named the Roy F. and Jeannette P. Nichols Professor Emeritus of American History. He was married to Mary Maples Dunn; together they raised two daughters. He died on January 24, 2022, at the age of 93.

== Academic career ==
Dunn began his teaching career at Princeton University in 1954, moving to University of Michigan in 1955, then joined the History Department at the University of Pennsylvania in 1957, where he eventually became chair of the department. Dunn was the founding director of the Philadelphia Center for Early American Studies, now called the McNeil Center for Early American Studies.

=== Awards and prizes ===
- American Council of Learned Societies grant-in-aid 1961
- Athenaeum of Philadelphia Award, 1963, for Puritans and Yankees
- Huntington Library fellowship, 1965
- Guggenheim fellowship, 1966–67
- American Philosophical Society grants, 1969, 1972
- Jamestown Foundation Award, 1972;
- Walter D. Love Prize, Conference on British Studies, 1973;
- National Book Award Finalist in History, 1973, for Sugar and Slaves
- National Endowment for the Humanities fellowship, 1974–75
- Visiting Member, Institute for Advanced Study, Princeton, 1974–75
- American Council of Learned Societies fellowship, 1977–78
- Visiting Fellow, Newberry Library, 1978
- Fellow, Center for Advanced Study in the Behavioral Sciences, Stanford, 1982–83
- Commonwealth Fund Lecturer, University College, London, 1983
- Society of Colonial Wars Distinguished Book Award (with Mary Maples Dunn) for The Papers of William Penn, 1990
- Visiting Scholar, Rockefeller Foundation Study Center, Bellagio, Italy, 1991
- Lindback Teaching Award, University of Pennsylvania, 1993
- Union Pacific Visiting Professor, University of Minnestora, 1994
- John M. Greene Award for distinguished service, Smith College, 1995
- The Richard S. Dunn Directorship named in his honor at the McNeil Center for Early American Studies
- The Richard S. Dunn Fellowship for excellence in any aspect of Early American Studies at the MCEAS
- Anisfield-Wolf Book Award for a Tale of Two Plantations in 2015
- The National Historical Association Award for Scholarly Distinction 2017

== Scholarly work ==
Dunn was the author of many scholarly articles and books, including Sugar and Slaves: The Rise of the Planter Class in the English West Indies, 1624-1713 in 1972. The book outlines the development of slave society and the Planter class by examining "sugar production techniques, the vicious character of the slave trade, the problems of adapting English ways to the tropics, and the appalling mortality rates for both blacks and whites that made these colonies the richest, but in human terms the least successful, in English America."

His book, A Tale of Two Plantations: Slave Life and Labor in Virginia and Jamaica, was published by Harvard University Press in 2014. The book earned Dunn the Anisfield-Wolf Book Award in 2015. According to the book's companion website, Two Plantations , Dunn was able to utilize slave holder records to recreate the genealogies of "1,103 slaves who lived at Mesopotamia [Jamaica] between 1762 and 1833, and the 973 slaves who lived at Mount Airy [Virginia] between 1808 and 1865. And he has reconstructed the lineages of slave families from both plantations through four or five generations."

He and his wife, Mary Maples Dunn, were co-executive officers of the American Philosophical Society from 2002 to 2007.

=== Books ===
Puritans and Yankees: The Winthrop Dynasty of New England, 1630-1717 (Princeton University Press, 1962); paperback edition by W.W.Norton, 1971.

The Age of Religious Wars, 1559-1689 (W. W. Norton, 1970), Expanded 2d ed., 1559-1715 (Norton, 1979)

Sugar and Slaves: The Rise of the Planter Class in the English West Indies, 1624-1713 (University of North Carolina Press, 1972)

The Papers of William Penn edited with Mary Maples Dunn, Richard Ryerson, Scott Wilds, Jean Soderlund, Marianne Wokeck, Craig Horle, Joy Wiltenburg, and Alison Hirsh (University of Pennsylvania Press)

Volume One, 1644-1679 (1981)

Volume Two, 1680-1684 (1982)

Volume Three, 1685-1700(1986)

Volume Four, 1701-1718(1987)

William Penn and the Founding of Pennsylvania, 1680-1684: A Documentary History, General Editor, with Mary Maples Dunn, ed. Jean R. Soderlund (University of Pennsylvania Press and the Historical Society of Pennsylvania, 1983)

The World of William Penn, a volume of twenty essays edited with Mary Maples Dunn (University of Pennsylvania Press, 1986)

Special issue of Pennsylvania Magazine of History and Biography, vol. 112, no. 2 (April, 1988), "Undergraduates as Historians: A Penn sylvania Sampler," Editor. Articles by five of his senior history honors majors at the University of Pennsylvania.

A Pennsylvania Album: Undergraduate Essays on the 250th Anniversary of the University of Pennsylvania, a volume of ten essays edited with Mark Frazier Lloyd (University of Pennsylvania, 1990)

The Journal of John Winthrop, 1630-1649, edited with Laetitia Yeandle and James Savage (Harvard University Press and the Massachusetts Historical Society)

The Journal of John Winthrop, 1630-1649: Abridged Edition, edited with Laetitia Yeandle (Harvard University Press, 1996)

A Tale of Two Plantations: Slave Life and Labor in Virginia and Jamaica (Harvard University Press in 2014)
