= Mary Maples Dunn =

American historian (1931–2017)

Acting President of Radcliffe College
- In office July 1999 – September 1999
- Preceded by: Linda S. Wilson

8th President of Smith College
- In office 1985–1995
- Preceded by: Jill Ker Conway
- Succeeded by: Ruth Simmons

Personal details
- Born: April 6, 1931 Sturgeon Bay, Wisconsin, U.S.
- Died: March 19, 2017 (aged 85) Winston-Salem, North Carolina, U.S.
- Spouse: Richard Slator Dunn
- Education: College of William & Mary (BS); Bryn Mawr College (MA, PhD)
- Profession: Historian

Academic background
- Thesis: A cause to plead: The political thought and career of William Penn from 1660 to 1701. (1959)

Academic work
- Discipline: History
- Institutions: Bryn Mawr College; Smith College; Radcliffe College

Mary Maples Dunn (April 6, 1931 – March 19, 2017) was an American historian. She served as the eighth president of Smith College for ten years beginning in 1985. Dunn was also the director of the Schlesinger Library from 1995 to 2000. She was acting president of Radcliffe College when it merged with Harvard University, and she became the acting dean of the newly created Radcliffe Institute for Advanced Study after the merger.

Dunn later became a Radcliffe Institute Fellow and served as co-executive officer of the American Philosophical Society from 2002 to 2007.

== Early life and education ==
Mary Maples was born on April 6, 1931, in Sturgeon Bay, Wisconsin, to Eva Moore Maples and Frederic Maples, who owned a clothing store. She was the second of four children and the only daughter. While in Wisconsin, she attended a two-room school house. Her father joined the Army during World War II where he remained as an officer after the war, retiring as a Colonel. As a result, the family was stationed in multiple bases around the United States and China.

== Career ==
Dunn's scholarship was focused primarily on William Penn, Pennsylvania, and the history of English-speaking colonies in the Mid-Atlantic region of what, following the American Revolutionary War, became the United States. She was a history professor at Bryn Mawr College in Bryn Mawr, Pennsylvania, where she taught an innovative interdisciplinary course in Latin American Studies in the mid-1970s.

The Mary Maples Dunn Prize, established in 2008 honors "the best article in early American women’s history by an untenured scholar published in William and Mary Quarterly that uses gender as a primary analytical category".

== Personal life ==
In 1960, she married Richard Slator Dunn, a scholar of American colonial history at the University of Pennsylvania, in Philadelphia. They had two daughters and three grandchildren from their 56 years together. Dunn remained a great traveler for the rest of her life. She and her husband were in Cairo during the Egyptian Revolution of 2011 in Tahrir Square “It was surreal,” describes Dunn “We could see it all. There we were on this elegant terrace, comfortably viewing it all… That’s the only word for it—surreal.” “We had wandered into a war,” she says. “It was very clear that this was historic. We had CNN on all the time, and had access to Al Jazeera." "And so we witnessed history in the making. It was an unusual experience, and an amazing opportunity. We are glad to be at home, but are feeling the greatest sympathy for the Egyptians, and maybe a little optimistic about their chances for a better regime and a reduction in the misery so many of them experience every day."

== Selected works ==
=== Books ===
- William Penn: Classical Republican (Philadelphia: Historical Society of Pennsylvania, 1957)
- William Penn: Politics and Conscience (Princeton University Press, 1967) ISBN 978-0-691-62331-3
- Women of America: A Teacher’s Guide (Continental Press, 1976)
- The World of William Penn (University of Pennsylvania Press, 1986), co-edited with Richard S. Dunn
- The Papers of William Penn, (University of Pennsylvania Press, 1981–87) 5 volumes; co-edited with Richard S. Dunn ISBN 978-0-8122-7800-2 | ISBN 978-0-8122-7852-1 | ISBN 978-0-8122-8029-6 | ISBN 978-0-8122-8050-0
- The Personality of William Penn(Philadelphia: American Philosophical Society, 1983)
- Recipes from the Inauguration of Mary Maples Dunn As the Eighth President of Smith College, September 1985, Northampton, Massachusetts. Northampton, (Mass: Marilyn Nelson and the Committee for the Inauguration, 1985) Co-authored with Julia Child.

=== Articles ===
- "Flawed Biographies," The Virginia Quarterly Review 51.3 (1975): 483–486
- “Saints and Sisters: Congregational and Quaker Women in the Early Colonial Period,” American Quarterly Vol. 30, No. 5, Special Issue: Women and Religion (Winter, 1978): 582–601
- "Who Is This William Penn Person, Anyway?" Today, the Inquirer Magazine (n.d.): 22–24. Co-authored with Katz, Barbara J, Richard S. Dunn
- "Dialogue: Paradigm Shift Books: A Midwife's Tale by Laurel Thatcher Ulrich," Journal of Women's History 14.3 (2002): 133–139

=== Book reviews ===
- "Book Review: Edward Randolph and the American Colonies, 1676–1703," The Journal of Southern History 27.2 (1961): 242–244
- "Book Review: Religion in American Life," The William and Mary Quarterly 19.1 (1962): 123–127. Co-authored with Richard S. Dunn
- "Book Review: the King & the Quaker: a Study of William Penn and James Ii," The Pennsylvania Magazine of History and Biography 87.1 (1963): 89–90
- "Book Review: William Penn the Politician: His Relations with the English Government," Quaker History 55.1 (1966): 56–57
- "Book Review: Liberty and Authority: Early American Political Ideology, 1689–1763," The Journal of American History 56.4 (1970)
- "Book Review: Benjamin Rush: Revolutionary Gadfly," The American Historical Review 78.1 (1973): 156–157
- "Book Review: William Penn and Early Quakerism." The William and Mary Quarterly. 32.2 (1975): 344.
- "Book Review: Weathering the Storm: Women of the American Revolution." The Journal of Southern History. 42.3 (1976): 421–422

== Notable students and protegees ==
- Drew Gilpin Faust, president emeritus, Harvard University.
- Mary Beth Norton, the Mary Donlon Alger Professor of American History and Stephen H. Weiss Presidential Fellow at Cornell University.

== Honors ==
- Dunn was the recipient of the Radcliffe Medal in 2001
- The Mary Maples Dunn Prize for early American women’s scholarship at the Omohundro Institute of Early American History and Culture
- The Mary Maples and Richard S. Dunn Fund at the American Philosophical Society

=== Fellowships ===
- Fulbright scholar
- American Council of Learned Societies
- National Endowment for the Humanities
- Institute for Advanced Study in Princeton, New Jersey

=== Honorary degrees ===
- Smith College
- Amherst College
- Brown University
- Lafayette College
- Marietta College
- Haverford College
- College of William & Mary
- Transylvania University
- University of Pennsylvania
