= Weiss Center =

- U.S. Post Office-Manchester Main
- U.S. National Register of Historic Places
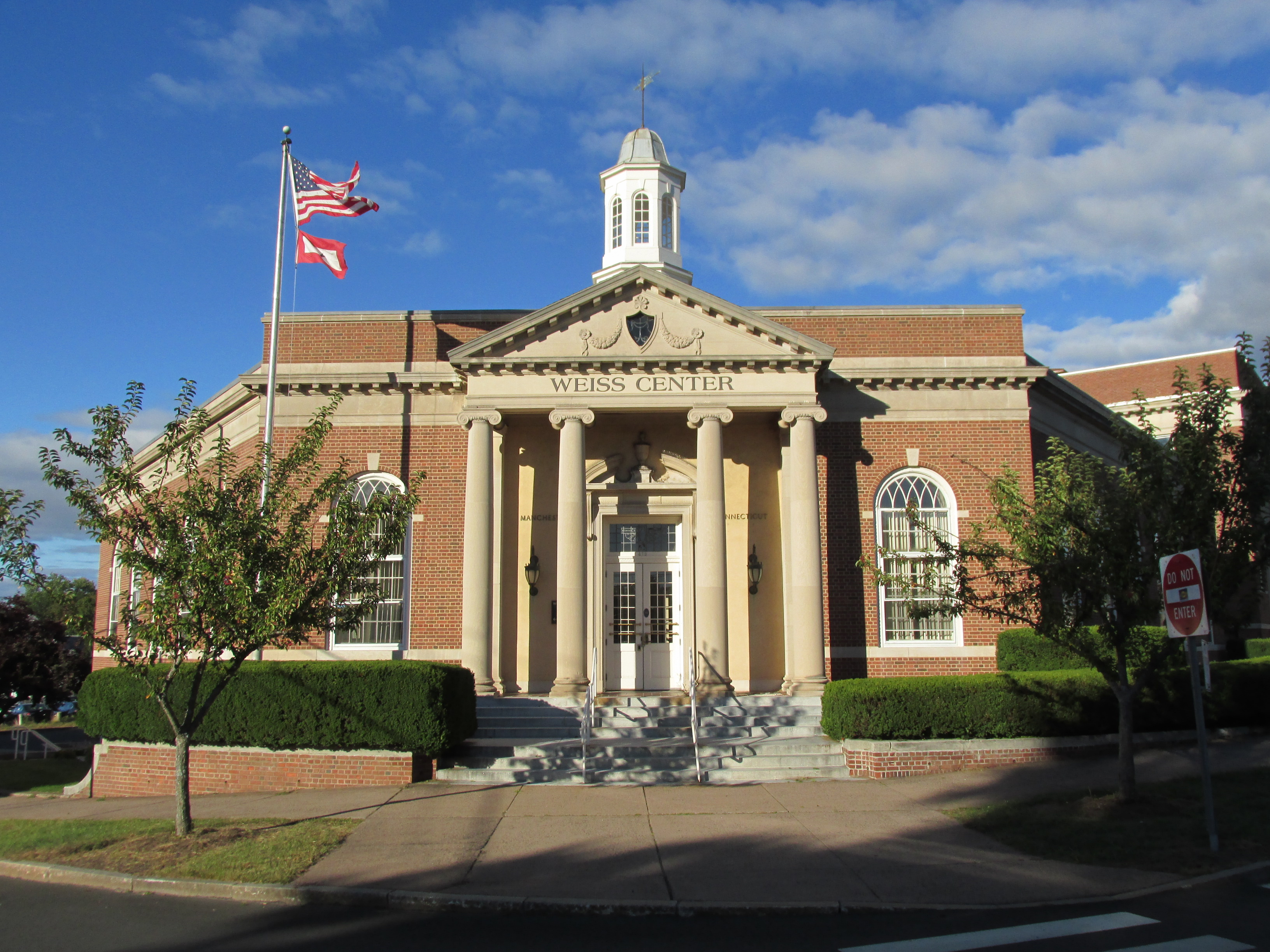
- The Weiss Center

- Location within Connecticut Location within the United States
- Interactive map showing the location of Weiss Center
- Location: 491 Main Street, Manchester, Connecticut
- Coordinates: 41°46′35″N 72°31′21″W
- Area: 0.5 acres (0.20 ha)
- Built: 1931
- Built by: Pieretti Bros.
- Architect: Wetmore, James
- Architectural style: Colonial Revival, Classical Revival, Georgian Revival
- NRHP reference No.: 86000127
- Added to NRHP: January 21, 1986

The Weiss Center, formerly the U.S. Post Office-Manchester Main is a historic building at 491 Main Street in Manchester, Connecticut. It was built in 1931 and was listed on the National Register of Historic Places in 1986 for its architecture.

== History ==
The Robert Weiss Center is located at the northern end of Manchester's main downtown commercial district, at the northeast corner of Main Street (Connecticut Route 83) and Center Street (U.S. Route 6). The building was constructed in 1931 by the federal government as Manchester's main post office. The post office occupied it until 1991, after which the building was acquired by the city. It was officially named the Weiss Center in 1994.

It was listed on the National Register of Historic Places on January 21, 1986.

== Architecture ==
It has a unique design, prompted by difficulties of its location, credited to United States Supervising Architect James Wetmore. It was built by Pieretti Brothers contractors. It includes Colonial Revival, Classical Revival, and Georgian Revival architectural features.

It is a single-story masonry structure, built out of brick with limestone trim, with a unique pentagonal floorplan. It presents a broad three-bay front entry facade at an angle to the street intersection, with a projecting Classical four-column portico at the center. The portico has round Doric columns rising to an entablature and a gabled pediment studded with modillion blocks. The center of the gable is decorated with garlands and swags. The flanking windows are tall round-headed sashes. The interior lobby area features brown tile flooring with white marble borders and wainscoting.

== See also ==
- National Register of Historic Places listings in Hartford County, Connecticut
- List of United States post offices
