= Early American Studies =

- Discipline: American history
- Language: English
- Edited by: Rosalind J. Beiler & Judith A. Ridner

Publication details
- History: 2003-present
- Publisher: University of Pennsylvania Press (United States)
- Frequency: Quarterly

Standard abbreviations
- ISO 4: Early Am. Stud.

Indexing
- ISSN: 1543-4273 (print); 1559-0895 (web)
- LCCN: 2003212072
- OCLC no.: 746948215

Links
- Journal homepage; Online abstracts; Online access at Project MUSE

Early American Studies is a peer-reviewed history journal covering the study of the histories and cultures of North America prior to 1850. The journal is sponsored by The McNeil Center for Early American Studies at the University of Pennsylvania. It is published quarterly by the University of Pennsylvania Press. It was established in 2003 and the editor-in-chief is Roderick A. McDonald (Rider University). It is available online through Project MUSE and JSTOR.
