= Ruth Simmons =

American scholar and academic administrator (born 1945)

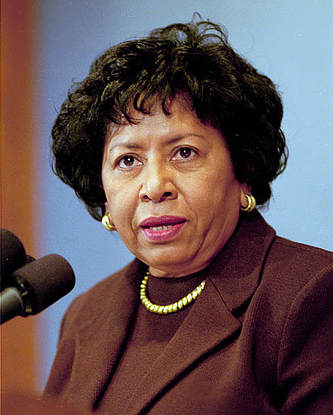
- Simmons in 2001

8th President of Prairie View A&M University
- In office July 1, 2017 – February 28, 2023
- Preceded by: George Wright
- Succeeded by: Tomikia P. LeGrande

18th President of Brown University
- In office October 14, 2001 – June 30, 2012
- Preceded by: Gordon Gee
- Succeeded by: Christina Paxson

9th President of Smith College
- In office 1995–2001
- Preceded by: Mary Maples Dunn
- Succeeded by: Carol T. Christ

Personal details
- Born: Ruth Jean Stubblefield; July 3, 1945 (age 81) Grapeland, Texas, U.S.
- Spouse: Norbert Alonzo
- Children: 2
- Education: Dillard University (BA); Harvard University (MA, PhD)

Academic background
- Thesis: The poetic language of Aime Cesaire (1973)

Academic work
- Discipline: Romance literature
- Institutions: University of New Orleans; California State University, Northridge; University of Southern California; Princeton University; Spelman College; Smith College; Brown University; Prairie View A&M University

Ruth Simmons (born Ruth Jean Stubblefield, July 3, 1945) is an American professor and academic administrator. Simmons served as the eighth president of Prairie View A&M University, a historically Black university (HBCU), from 2017 until 2023. From 2001 to 2012, she served as the 18th president of Brown University, where she was the first African-American president of an Ivy League institution. During her time at Brown, Simmons was named the best college president by Time magazine. Prior to Brown University, she headed Smith College, one of the Seven Sisters and the largest women's college in the United States, beginning in 1995. During her tenure, Smith College launched the first accredited engineering program at an all-women's college.

Simmons is a professor of literature specializing in the Romance languages. As of 2017, Simmons is a fellow of the American Academy of Arts and Sciences, the American Philosophical Society (1997), an honorary fellow of Selwyn College, Cambridge, and a Chevalier of the French Legion of Honor.

In February 2023, Simmons announced her plans to advise Harvard University on fostering relationships with historically black universities (HBCUs). As of April 2023, Simmons serves as a President's Distinguished Fellow at Rice University.

== Early life and education ==
Simmons was born in Grapeland, Texas. She is the last of 12 children of Fanny (née Campbell) and Isaac Stubblefield. Her father was a sharecropper up until the family moved to Houston during her school years. Her paternal grandfather descends partly from the Benza and Kota people, enslaved people from Gabon, while her maternal line is traced back to the indigenous peoples of America.

While in school, one of her teachers, Vernell Lillie, talked to her about attending college, something she had never considered before as a first-generation college student. She earned her bachelor's degree, on scholarship, from Dillard University in New Orleans, Louisiana, in 1967. She earned her master's and a doctorate in Romance literature from Harvard University in 1970 and 1973, respectively.

== Career ==
=== Early academic positions ===
Simmons was an assistant professor of French at the University of New Orleans (UNO) from 1973 to 1976 and assistant dean of UNO's College of Liberal Arts from 1975 to 1976. She moved to California State University, Northridge in 1977 as administrative coordinator of its NEH Liberal Studies Project. From 1978 to 1979, she was acting director of California State University, Northridge's International Programs and visiting associate professor of Pan-African Studies.

Simmons moved to the University of Southern California in 1979 as assistant dean of graduate studies and later as associate dean of graduate studies. In 1983, she moved to Princeton University and served as assistant dean of faculty, and later as associate dean of faculty from 1986 to 1990. Simmons served as provost at Spelman College from 1990 to 1991 and returned to Princeton, where she served as vice provost from 1992 to 1995.

=== Smith College presidency ===
In 1995, Simmons was selected as president of Smith College, which she led until 2001. As president of Smith College, Simmons started the first engineering program at a U.S. woman's college.

=== Brown University presidency ===
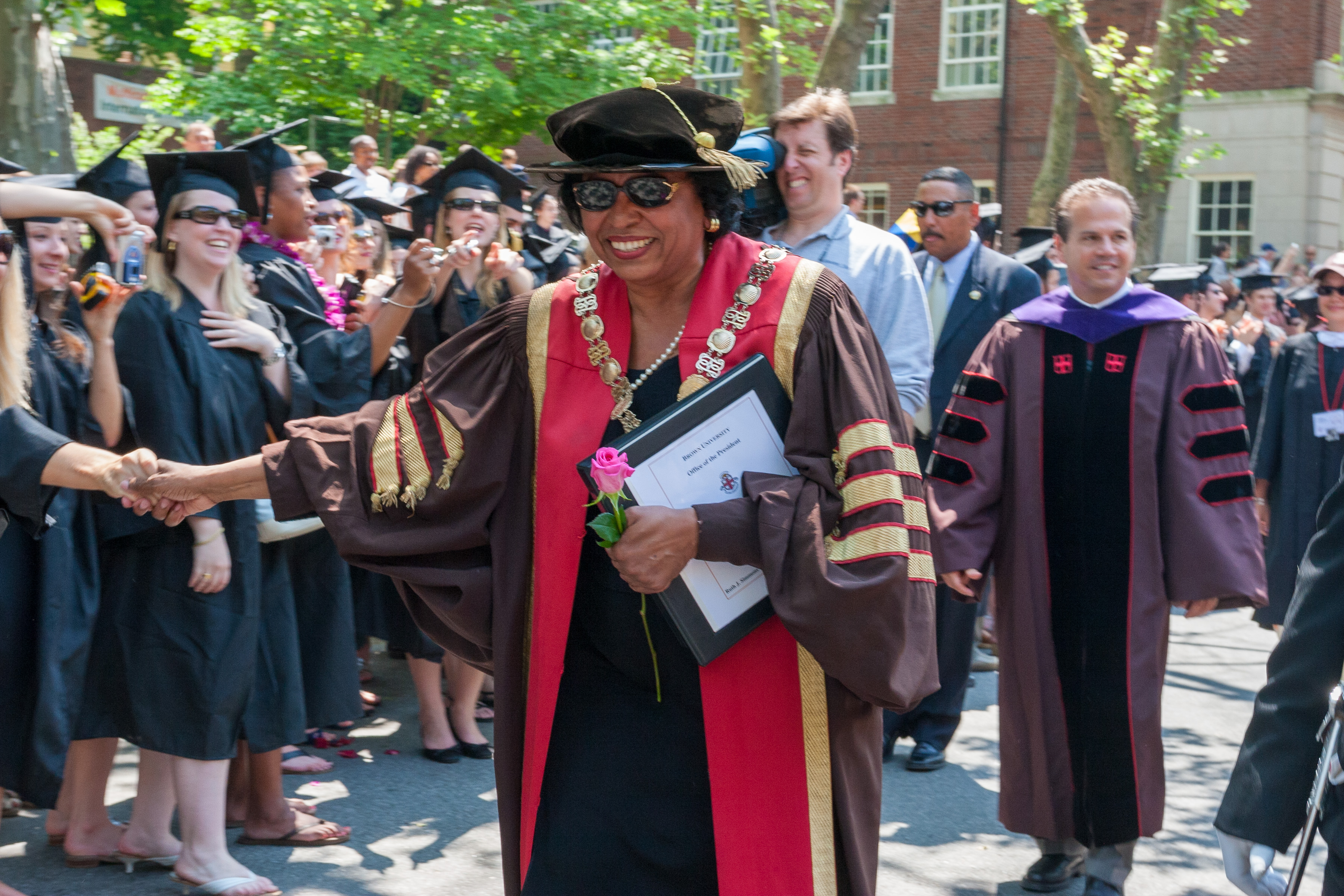
Ruth Simmons at Brown's 2006 Commencement. David Cicilline, then mayor of Providence, behind her.

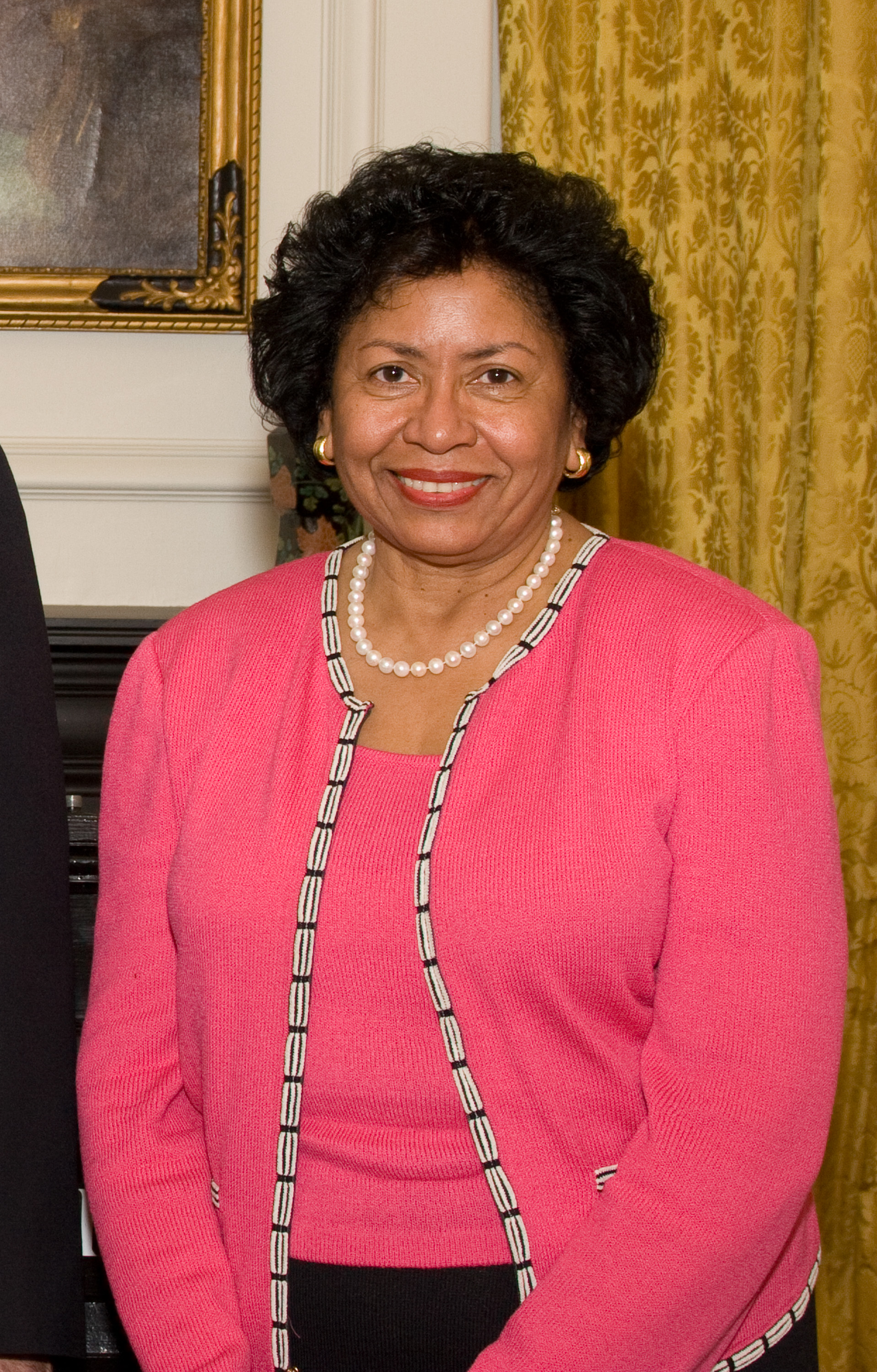
Simmons in 2008 during her tenure as President of Brown University

In November 2000, Simmons was named as the first African-American woman to head an Ivy League school. She officially assumed office in October 2001, succeeding Gordon Gee. She also held appointments as a professor in the departments of Comparative Literature and Africana Studies. In 2002, Ms. magazine named her a Woman of the Year; in 2001, Time named her as America's best college president.

At Brown, she launched a $1.4 billion initiative known as Boldly Brown: The Campaign for Academic Enrichment to enhance Brown's academic programs. The campaign would surpass its original goal, raising $1.61 billion. In 2004, former Brown student Sidney E. Frank made the largest aggregate monetary contribution to Brown in its history in the amount of $120 million.

In 2007, philanthropist Warren Alpert made a similar contribution to strengthen the programs of The Warren Alpert Medical School of Brown University in the amount of $100 million. As reported in a May 22, 2009 press release, Brown Chancellor Thomas J. Tisch announced the early attainment of the $1.6 billion fundraising campaign and the continued pursuit of specific subsidiary goals in support of endowments for student scholarships of the Brown faculty and internationalization programs through the originally planned campaign to be continued through December 31, 2010.

In 2006, during an orientation meeting with parents, Simmons denied interest in the presidency of Harvard University, headed at the time by interim president Derek Bok. Nevertheless, a 2007 New York Times article, featuring a photograph of Simmons, reported that the Harvard Corporation, responsible for selecting the university's replacement for former president Lawrence Summers, had been given a list of "potential candidates" that included her name.

In August 2007, Simmons was invited to deliver the 60th Annual Reading of the historic 1790 George Washington Letter to Touro Synagogue at the Synagogue in Newport, Rhode Island, in response to Moses Seixas on religious pluralism. According to a March 2009 poll by The Brown Daily Herald, Simmons had more than an 80% approval rating among Brown undergraduates.

In September 2011, Simmons announced that she would step down from her position as President of Brown at the end of the 2011–12 academic year, initially saying she would remain at Brown as a professor of comparative literature and Africana studies. She was succeeded as the President of Brown on June 30, 2012, by Christina Paxson.

==== Goldman Sachs role and compensation ====
Simmons earned annual compensations of more than $300,000 from Goldman Sachs (on top of her annual salary from Brown of more than $500,000), while serving on the Goldman board of directors during the 2008 financial crisis; in addition, she left the Goldman board (which she had joined in 2000) in 2009 with more than $4.3 million in Goldman stock. During her term on Goldman's board, she also served on the compensation committee of Goldman's ten-person board, which decided how large Goldman executives' post-crash bonuses would be: these bonuses included a $68 million bonus for the company's chairman and CEO, Lloyd C. Blankfein, in 2007, and a $9 million bonus in 2009, after Goldman received money in the federal TARP bailout. The revelations of Simmons's role received intense criticism from both alumni and students with a then-sophomore stating that Simmons's actions "brought shame on the university." Simmons was cited in the 2010 film Inside Job, as an example of the conflicts of interest between university economics departments and deregulation of financial institutions.

==== Transnational initiatives at Brown ====
In 2003, Simmons established the University Steering Committee on Slavery and Justice. In 2006, the Report of the Brown University Steering Committee on Slavery and Justice was published, examining the university's complex history with the transatlantic slave trade. On February 16, 2007, at an event celebrating the 200th anniversary of the passage of the Slave Trade Act 1807 and the involvement of Cambridge University alumni William Wilberforce, Thomas Clarkson and William Pitt the Younger, Simmons delivered a lecture at St. John's College, Cambridge, entitled Hidden in Plain Sight: Slavery and Justice in Rhode Island. Also in February 2007, Brown University published its official Response to the Report of the Steering Committee on Slavery and Justice following the completion of the inquiry undertaken by the committee appointed by Simmons.

In October 2007, Simmons appointed David W. Kennedy, as vice president for international affairs. Brown and Banco Santander of Spain inaugurated an annual series of International Advanced Research Institutes to convene younger scholars from emerging and developing countries at Brown in a signing ceremony on November 13, 2008, at the John Hay Library between Brown provost David Kertzer and Emilio Botin, chairman of Banco Santander. In March 2010, Simmons traveled to India as part of a program called the Year of India, dedicated to improving the understanding of Indian history, politics, education, and culture among Brown students and faculty.

On September 15, 2011, Simmons announced that she would retire from the Brown presidency at the end of the academic year, June 30, 2012.

=== Prairie View A&M University presidency ===
In 2017, after five years of retirement, Simmons accepted an offer to serve as the interim president of Prairie View A&M University, an HBCU in her home state of Texas. She served as interim president from July 1, 2017 to December 3, 2017. On December 4, 2017, she was selected as the eighth president of Prairie View A&M University, becoming the first woman to do so.

At Prairie View A&M, Simmons focused her efforts on improving the university's financial stability, particularly on fundraising through an anonymous donor for the Panther Success Grants for undergraduates. Her vision for the university was to "ensure that Prairie View A&M University sustains excellence in teaching, research, and service for another 140-plus years...we will raise funds in a new and vital way so that the University will have the flexibility it needs to advance and make more visible its reach." On March 11, 2022, Simmons announced that she would retire from her role as president when the university named her successor.

In 2022, Prairie View A&M announced that scholarships had increased and donations to the university had grown by 40% during Simmons’ 5-year presidency.

=== Civic activities and honors ===
- Simmons is a fellow of the American Academy of Arts and Sciences, the American Philosophical Society, and the Council on Foreign Relations. She previously served as chair of the Council of Ivy Group Presidents and is an honorary fellow of Selwyn College, Cambridge.
- In 2000, Simmons received the Golden Plate Award of the American Academy of Achievement.
- On June 17, 2009, President Barack Obama appointed Dr. Simmons to the President's Commission on White House Fellowships.
- On January 16, 2010, Simmons received a BET Honors award for her service as president of Brown University.
- In 2010, she was awarded the Ellis Island Medal of Honor for her many humanitarian efforts.
- In 2012, Brown University renamed Lincoln Field in her honor as Ruth J. Simmons Quadrangle.
- In 2012, Simmons received honorary doctorates from Mt. Sinai School of Medicine, the University of Oklahoma, the University of Houston, and the University of Rochester.
- Simmons was named a Chevalier of the French Legion of Honor in 2012.
- Simmons was selected for the inaugural 2021 Forbes 50 Over 50; made up of entrepreneurs, leaders, scientists and creators who are over the age of 50.
- In 2023, Brown University renamed its Center for the Study of Slavery and Justice in honor of Simmons.
- Also in 2023, Simmons delivered the 2023 Jefferson Lecture in the Humanities at the Smithsonian National Museum of African American History and Culture.
- In 2024, Simmons was elected as a member of the Texas Institute of Letters.

== Works ==
- Simmons, Ruth J. (September 5, 2023). Up Home. Random House. ISBN 978-0-593-44600-3.

== See also ==
Academic offices
Preceded by Mary Maples Dunn	9th President of Smith College; 1995–2001	Succeeded by Carol Christ
Preceded by Gordon Gee	18th President of Brown University; 2001–2012	Succeeded by Christina Paxson
Preceded by George C. Wright	8th President of Prairie View A&M University; 2017–2023	Succeeded by Tomikia P. LeGrande
