= Tomikia P. LeGrande =

American academic administrator

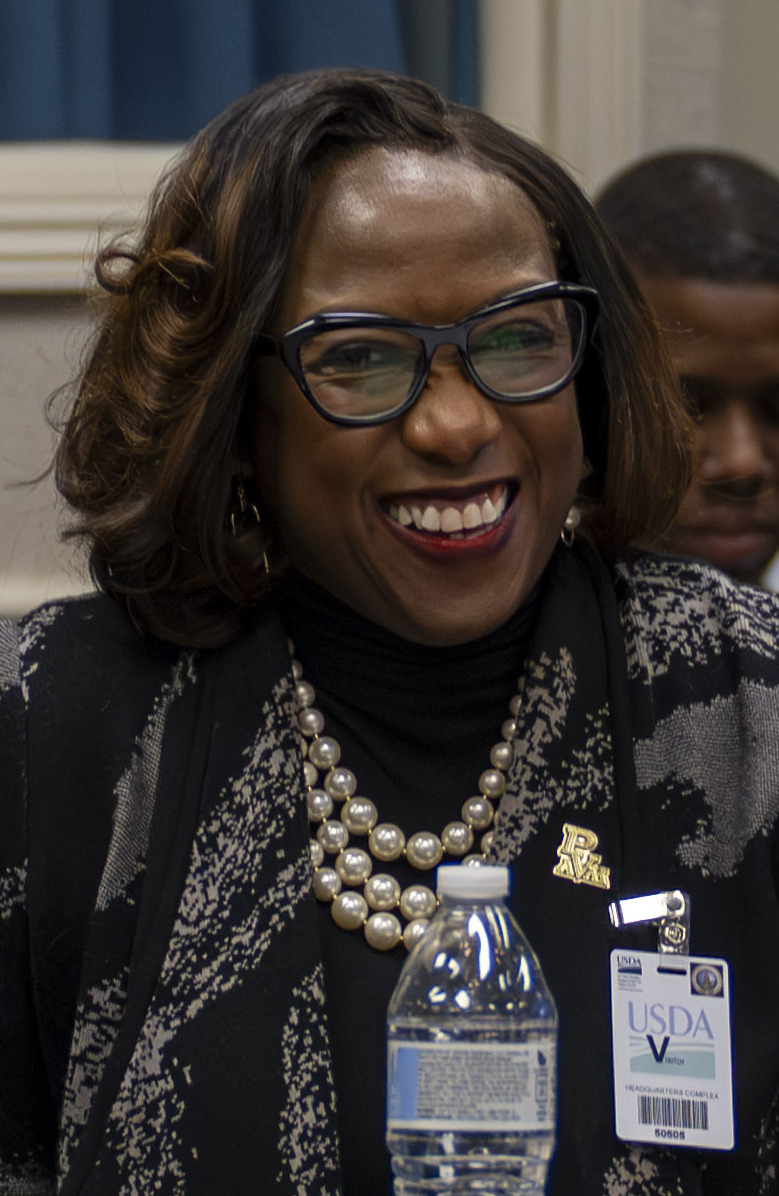

9th President of Prairie View A&M University
- Incumbent
- Assumed office June 1, 2023
- Preceded by: Ruth J. Simmons

Personal details
- Born: 1979 or 1980 (age 45–46)
- Education: Savannah State University; North Carolina A&T State University; Texas Tech University

Tomikia Pickett LeGrande is an American academic administrator serving as the ninth president of the Prairie View A&M University since 2023. She was the vice president for strategy, enrollment management, and student success at Virginia Commonwealth University from 2018 to 2023.

== Life ==
LeGrande was born to Thomas and Barbara Pickett and is from Savannah, Georgia. She attended Savannah High School and earned a B.S. in chemistry from Savannah State University. LeGrande completed a M.S. in chemistry at North Carolina A&T State University. She received an Ed.D. in higher education administration from the Texas Tech University. Her 2016 dissertation was titled, Effects of Organization Culture and Climate on Career Aspirations and Advancement: A Collective Case Study Analysis of the Experiences and Perceptions of Women of Color in Midlevel Student Affairs. Stephanie J. Jones was her doctoral advisor.

LeGrande was the associate vice chancellor of enrollment management and director of admissions at the Winston-Salem State University. At the University of Houston–Downtown, she was the vice president for strategic enrollment management. From 2018 to April 2023, LeGrande worked at the Virginia Commonwealth University as the vice president for strategy, enrollment management, and student success. On June 1, 2023, LeGrande became the ninth president of Prairie View A&M University, succeeding Ruth J. Simmons, Ph.D., the university's first female president.
