= Robert L. McNeil Jr. =

American chemist and pharmaceutical executive (1915–2010)

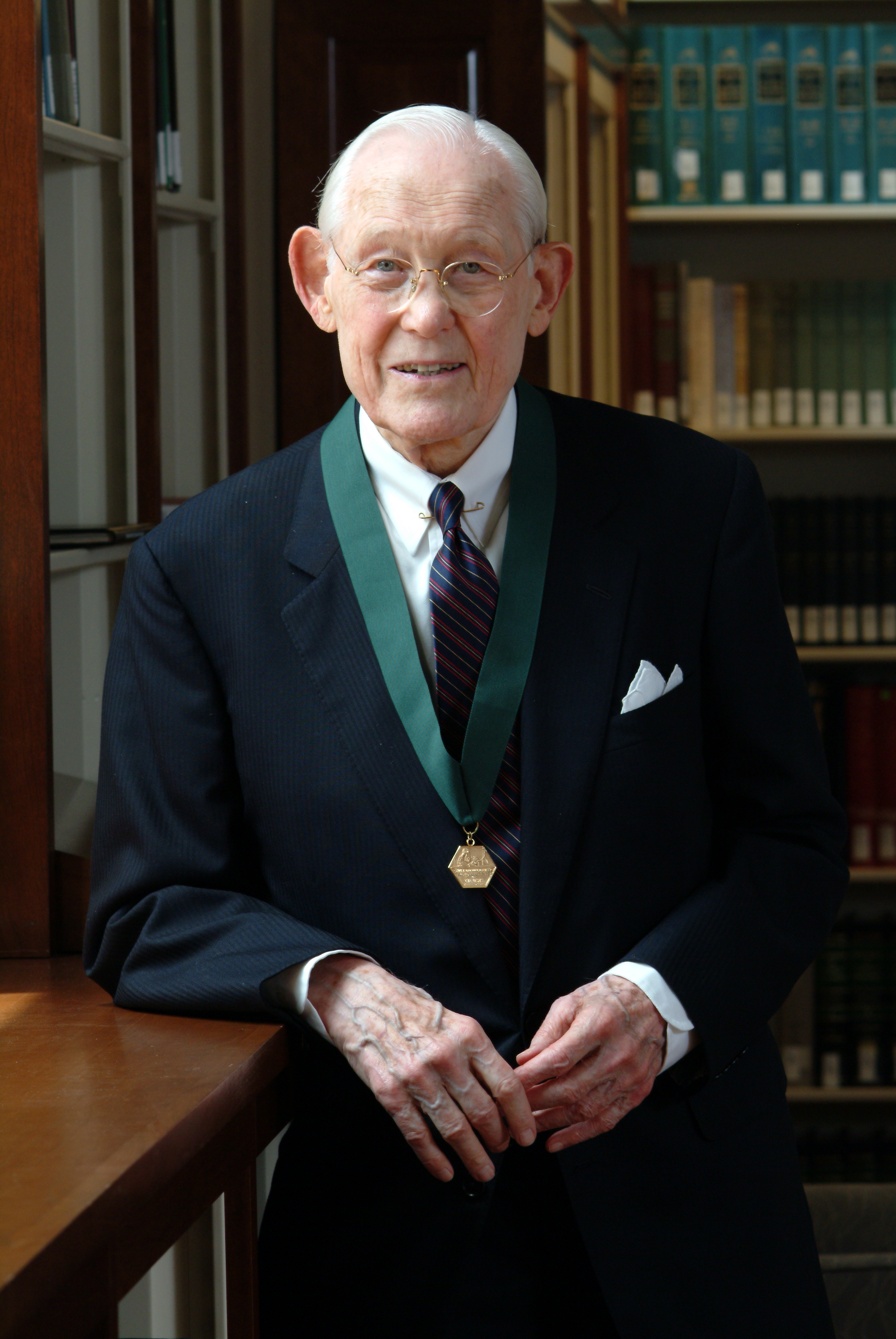
- With AIC Gold Medal, 2005
- Born: June 13, 1915; Bethel, Connecticut, U.S.
- Died: May 20, 2010 (aged 94); Wyndmoor, Pennsylvania, U.S.
- Burial place: West Laurel Hill Cemetery, Bala Cynwyd, Pennsylvania, U.S.
- Education: Yale University, Philadelphia College of Pharmacy and Science
- Spouse: Nancy McKinney Jones
- Awards: American Institute of Chemists Gold Medal
- Scientific career
- Fields: Chemist

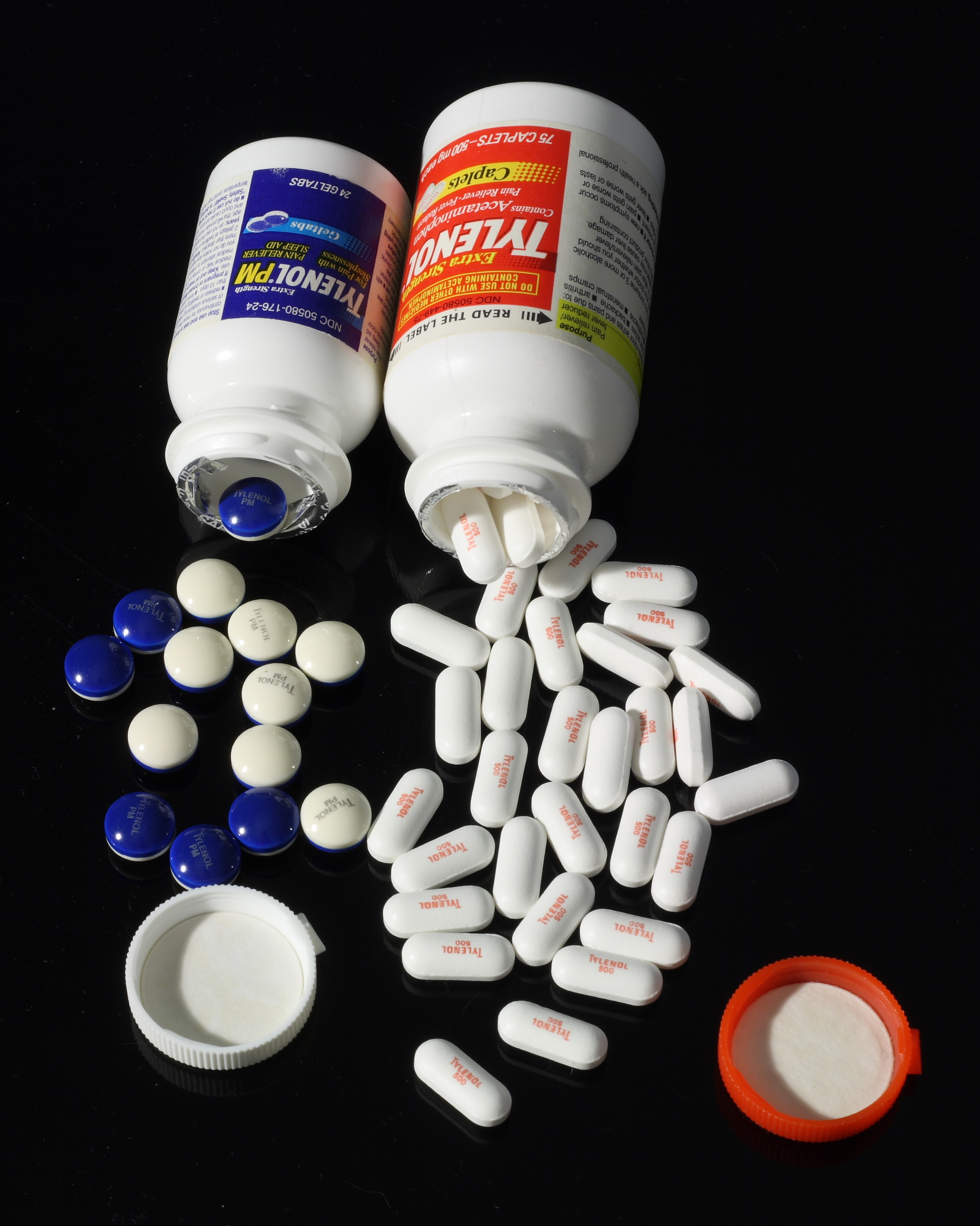
Tylenol PM (left) and Tylenol (right)

Robert Lincoln McNeil Jr. (June 13, 1915 – May 20, 2010) was an American chemist and pharmaceutical industry executive at McNeil Laboratories. He was responsible for the commercial development, naming, and introduction of the pain reliever Tylenol.

== Early life and education ==
McNeil was born in Bethel, Connecticut, on June 13, 1915, during a family trip to his maternal grandparents. He was raised in the Germantown neighborhood of Philadelphia and graduated from Germantown Academy in 1932.

As a young man, he worked as a delivery boy for his father at the pharmacy founded by his grandfather. He also worked as a camp counselor and on a ranch during the summers.

He earned two undergraduate degrees; the first in 1936 from Yale University, where he majored in physiological chemistry and bacteriology; and a second bachelor's degree in 1938, from the Philadelphia College of Pharmacy and Science. He attended graduate level classes in pharmacology at Temple University School of Pharmacy.

In 1970, he received an honorary Doctor of Science degree from the University of the Sciences in Philadelphia.

== Career ==
In 1938, he joined McNeil Laboratories, the family business for three generations, founded in 1879. The company had been founded as a corner drug store and had grown into selling medicines on a commercial basis. He transformed the company, added a research and development group to develop new prescription medications and restructured the products offered for sale.

To compete with the aspirin products sold by his company's competitors and having heard of work being done on the chemical by researchers, McNeil started in 1951 pursuing the development of what he named "acetaminophen", a chemical that had been discovered decades earlier but was little tested at the time as a pain reliever. The chemical's name N-acetyl-p-aminophenol was the source for the generic name "acetaminophen" (N-acetyl-p-aminophenol) coined by McNeil, as well as of the brand name "Tylenol" (N-acetyl-p-aminophenol), which was coined by a colleague.

McNeil recognized that high production costs would mean that the product would have to sell at a higher price than the commonly available aspirin, but that it would have the benefit of not causing stomach irritation. Tylenol was initially approved by the United States Food and Drug Administration in 1955 for sale on a prescription basis, and became available for sale to consumers over the counter in 1960. Elixir Tylenol, a liquid medicine advertised "for little hotheads" went on sale as the first product bearing the Tylenol brand name. McNeil was named chairman of McNeil in 1956 and he remained as chairman of the company after it was purchased in 1960 by Johnson & Johnson for $30 million in stock and was operated as a subsidiary of that firm.

On September 11, 2001, McNeil donated an original copy of the first public print of the Constitution, published in the Pennsylvania Packet on September 19, 1787, to the National Constitution Center.

In 2006, the Philadelphia Museum of Art exhibited 50 pieces of presidential china that McNeil donated to the museum, part of a collection of 450 pieces that ranged from the presidencies of George Washington through Ronald Reagan. The collection includes a large number of pieces of the rare Lincoln china service. The collection was described by The New York Times as being "considered one of the most important outside the White House".

McNeil created the Barra Foundation, dedicating to helping non-profits to improve life in the greater Philadelphia area. Following significant donations from the Foundation to the Philadelphia Center for Early American Studies, a historical research institute at the University of Pennsylvania, the center was renamed The McNeil Center for Early American Studies in 1998.

He was a member of the Philadelphia Club, the Philadelphia Cricket Club, Saint Andrew's society of Philadelphia, and the Union League of Philadelphia. He served as president of the Sons of the American Revolution.

McNeil died of heart failure at age 94 on May 20, 2010, at his Wyndmoor, Pennsylvania, home. He was interred at West Laurel Hill Cemetery in Bala Cynwyd, Pennsylvania. He was survived by his wife, the former Nancy McKinney Jones, as well as by two daughters, two sons and 11 grandchildren.

== Awards ==
- 2005 Membership to the American Philosophical Society
- 2005 American Institute of Chemists Gold Medal

== Legacy ==
The University of Pennsylvania Perelman School of Medicine established the Robert L. McNeil Jr. Professorship of Translational Medicine and Therapeutics in 2007 in his honor. The University of Pennsylvania also renamed the McNeil Center for Early American Studies in his honor.
