= McNeil Center for Early American Studies =

American research institute

The McNeil Center for Early American Studies
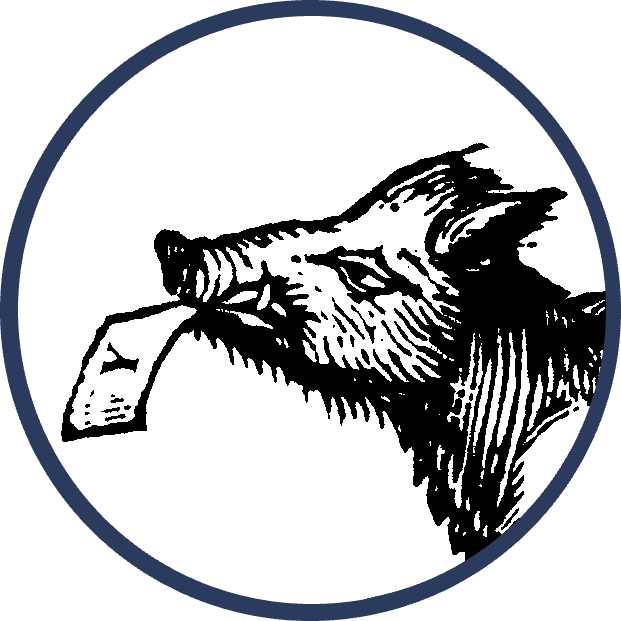
- Established: 1978
- Focus: Basic research in all areas of early American history and culture
- Staff: Director, Emma Hart Associate Director, Peter Jakob Olsen-Harbich Associate Director, Amy Baxter-Bellamy Administrative Assistant, Wendy Coffman
- Address: 3355 Woodland Walk
- Location: Philadelphia, PA
- Website: https://mceas.org

The McNeil Center for Early American Studies (MCEAS) is an independent research institute based at the University of Pennsylvania. MCEAS was established in 1978 to support basic research on early American history and cultures. MCEAS defines “early America” chronologically as the era between 1492 and 1850 A.D. and has a particular commitment to the North American mid-Atlantic (a region consisting of the modern states of Delaware, New Jersey, Pennsylvania, and New York), but is known as a premier research institute for the study of early modern North America generally. The Center publishes a peer-reviewed journal, Early American Studies, and a monograph series of the same name, both with the University of Pennsylvania Press.

The Center was originally known as the Philadelphia Center for Early American Studies, and was founded through a $575,000 grant from the Mellon Foundation. In 1998, it was renamed for its principal donor, Robert L. McNeil Jr. The Center's 10,000-square foot-facility on Penn's campus was built in 2005 by Robert A.M. Stern Architects in the Colonial Revival style, and draws from Federalist and Georgian forms.

Richard S. Dunn served as the founding director from 1978 to 2000, succeeded by Daniel K. Richter. Emma Hart assumed the directorship in 2021.

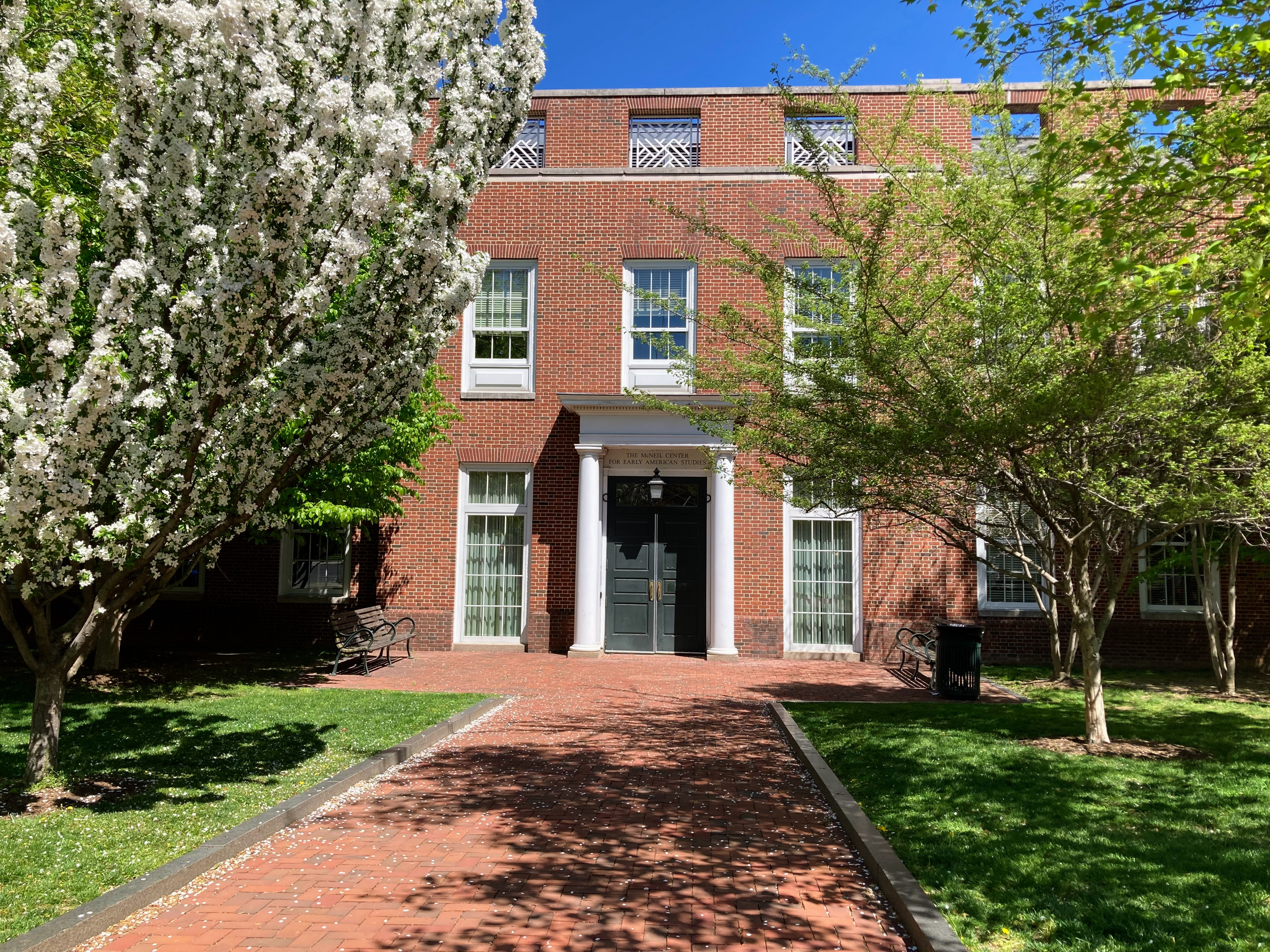
The McNeil Center for Early American Studies, front entrance
