= Charles Wallace =

Charles Wallace may refer to:

== Sports ==
- Charles Wallace (footballer) (1885–1942), English footballer
- Charlie Wallace (1885–1970), English footballer
- Charles Wallace (cricketer) (1899–1946), English cricketer
- Blondy Wallace (died 1937), American football player
- Charlie Wallace (basketball) (1948–2023), American basketball player
- Charles Judson Wallace (born 1982), basketball player

== Others ==
- Charles William Wallace (1855–1916), Anglo-Indian co-founder of Shaw Wallace
- Charles William Wallace (1865–1932), American scholar and researcher
- Charles L. Wallace (1871–1949), Irish-born American architect
- Charles Wallace Murry, or Charles Wallace, a fictional character

== See also ==
- Charles Wallis (disambiguation)
