= Homaro Cantu =

American chef and inventor (1976–2015)

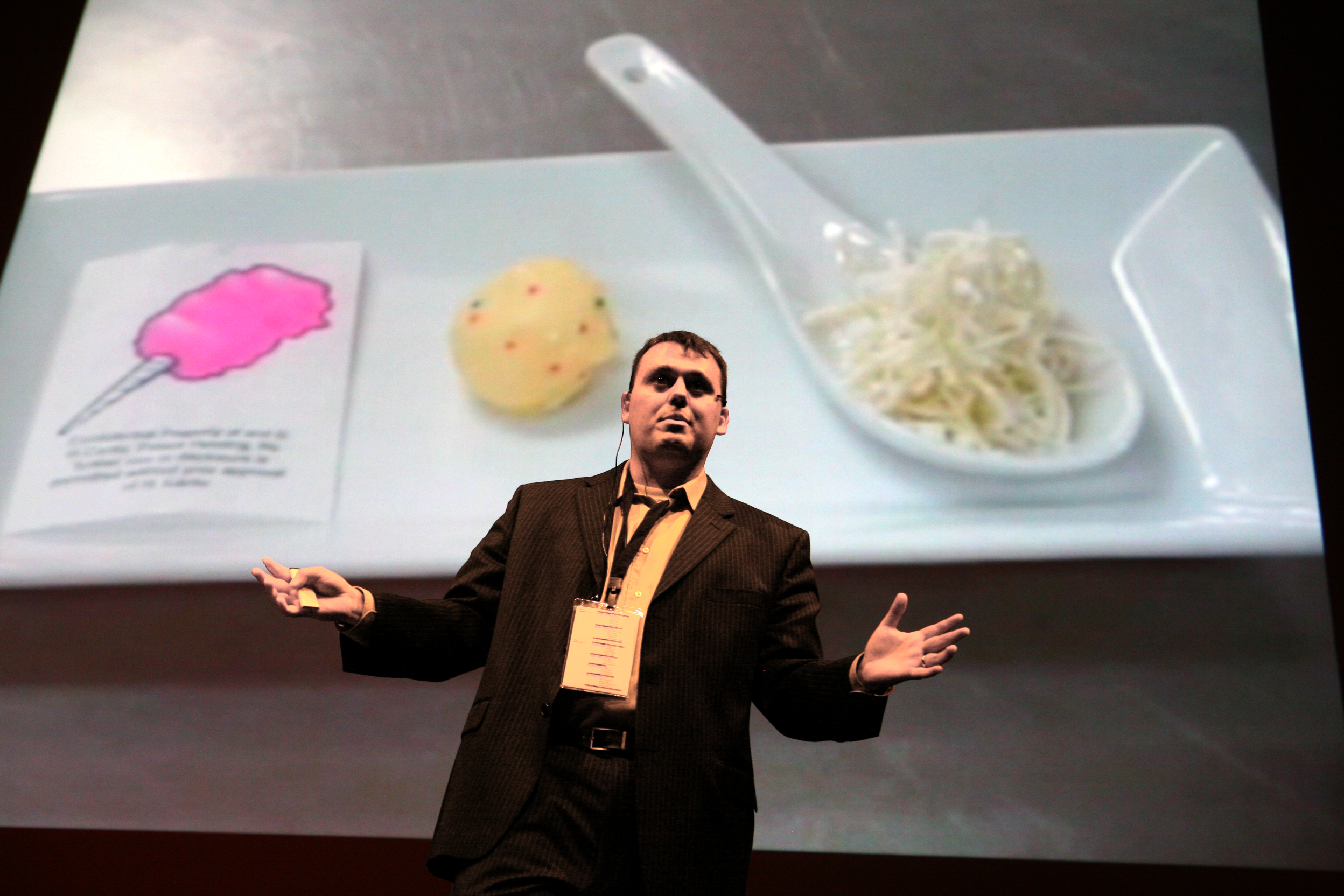
- Cantu at the 2008 Cusp Conference
- Born: Homaro Cantu Jr. September 23, 1976; Tacoma, Washington, U.S.
- Died: April 14, 2015 (aged 38); Chicago, Illinois, U.S.
- Other name: Omar
- Education: Western Culinary Institute
- Years active: 1997–2015
- Spouse: Katie McGowan (m. 2003–2015)
- Children: 2
- Culinary career
- Cooking style: Molecular gastronomy
- Rating
- Michelin stars
- Current restaurants
- Moto; Berrista
- Previous restaurant
- iNG
- Television show
- Future Food
- Website: www.cantudesigns.com

Homaro "Omar" Cantu Jr. (September 23, 1976 – April 14, 2015) was an American chef and inventor known for his use of molecular gastronomy. As a child, Cantu was fascinated with science and engineering. While working in a fast food restaurant, he discovered the similarities between science and cooking and decided to become a chef. In 1999, he was hired by his idol, Chicago chef Charlie Trotter. In 2003, Cantu became the first chef of Moto, which he later purchased.

Through Moto, Cantu explored his unusual ideas about cooking including edible menus, carbonated fruit, and food cooked with a laser. Initially seen as a novelty only, Moto eventually earned critical praise and, in 2012, a Michelin star. Cantu's second restaurant, iNG, and his coffee house, Berrista, focused on the use of "miracle berries" to make sour food taste sweet. He was working on opening a brewery called Crooked Fork at the time of his suicide in 2015.

In addition to being a chef, Cantu was a media personality, appearing regularly on TV shows, and an inventor. In 2010, he produced and co-hosted a show called Future Food. Through his media appearances, he advocated for an end to world hunger and thought his edible paper creation and the miracle berry could play a significant role in that goal. Cantu volunteered his time and money to a variety of charities and patented several food gadgets.

== Early life ==
Cantu was born in Tacoma, Washington, on September 23, 1976, to Laurie Ann Roberts, later of Portland, Oregon, and Homaro Cantu, later of Salem, Oregon. His father was a fabrication engineer and Cantu developed a passion for science and engineering at a young age. He disassembled the family lawn mower three times to learn how it worked, and his "Christmas gifts would wind up in a million pieces."

A self-described problem child, Cantu grew up in Portland, Oregon. From the age of six to nine, he was homeless. He would later credit the homelessness for his inspiration to make food and become a social entrepreneur. At the age of twelve, Cantu was nearly jailed for starting a large fire near his fathers house and began working at a fast food restaurant. Cantu later described the owner's purchase of a tandoori oven as spurring his interest in cooking. After he completed high school, Bill and Jan Miller, a couple who took in troubled teens, offered Cantu a place to live under the condition that he attend culinary school.

== Cooking career ==
Cantu graduated from the Western Culinary Institute in Portland (later a Le Cordon Bleu School) and spent the next two years staging on the West Coast. After about 50 such two-week to one-month internships, he was ready for a paid job. One day in February 1999, he decided to try to get a job with his idol, Charlie Trotter. "I made it my life's goal to become a sous chef for Charlie Trotter," Cantu remarked. "I literally just flew out [to Chicago] one day with $300 in my pocket and no place to stay". Despite initially rebuffing Cantu as rude, Trotter agreed to an interview the following day and hired him. Cantu eventually worked his way up to become one of Trotter's sous chefs. On his days off, he began to explore new ways to prepare and present food.

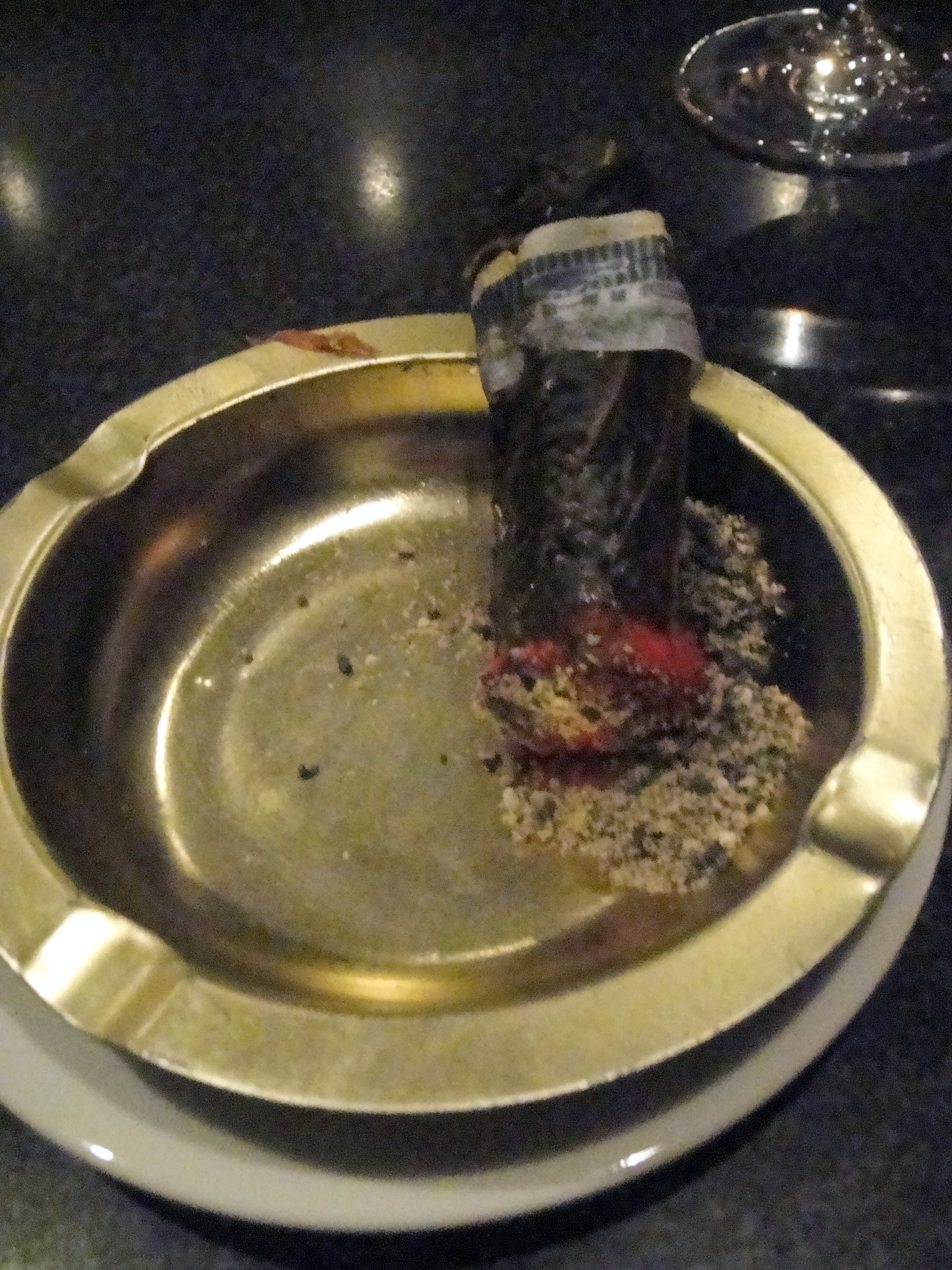
Despite its appearances, this "cigar" is actually pork shoulder wrapped in a leaf with red pepper puree to make it look lit and toasted sesame seed "ashes".

In 2003, Cantu learned of a chef opening at a soon-to-open restaurant called Moto. The restaurant's backer, Joseph De Vito, initially suggested that the restaurant focus on Asian fusion. However, after Cantu cooked an elaborate seven-course meal featuring an exploding ravioli and a small table-top box that cooked fish, De Vito instead hired Cantu.

Upon Moto's opening in January 2004, guests were initially confused by the tasting menu's format and content, but the restaurant soon became notable for its experimentation: dishes included carbonated fruit, menus printed on edible paper using a conventional printer filled with edible ink, and fish and bread cooked from the inside out using a class IV laser. At weekly brainstorming sessions, Moto chefs were encouraged to explore and prototype new takes on ordinary food by discussing how they could change foods they ate that week.

Although the restaurant was sometimes criticized for "emphasiz[ing] cleverness over deliciousness", Moto earned a Michelin star in 2012. Chefs were also split, variously describing Cantu as a "faddish flavor of the month" or a "creative genius." Grant Achatz described Cantu as "an ambassador of creative food." Together with Achatz and Graham Elliot, Cantu helped earn Chicago a reputation as the center of the innovative food. Ferran Adria also praised Cantu as a chef with the capacity to explore "what is the limit–what is cooking, what is not cooking".

Cantu's second restaurant, iNG, focused on a concept he called "flavor-tripping" – the use of the "miracle berry" to make sour foods taste sweet. The restaurant lost money and was closed in the Spring of 2014. After iNG closed, Cantu opened a coffee house called Berrista focused around the same concept. At the time of his death, he was preparing to open a brewery/brewpub called Crooked Fork with his friend and former Moto manager Trevor Rose-Hamblin. In September 2016, Rose-Hamblin and another of Cantu's associates, Matthias Merges, opened the brewpub, now renamed Old Irving Brewing Company.

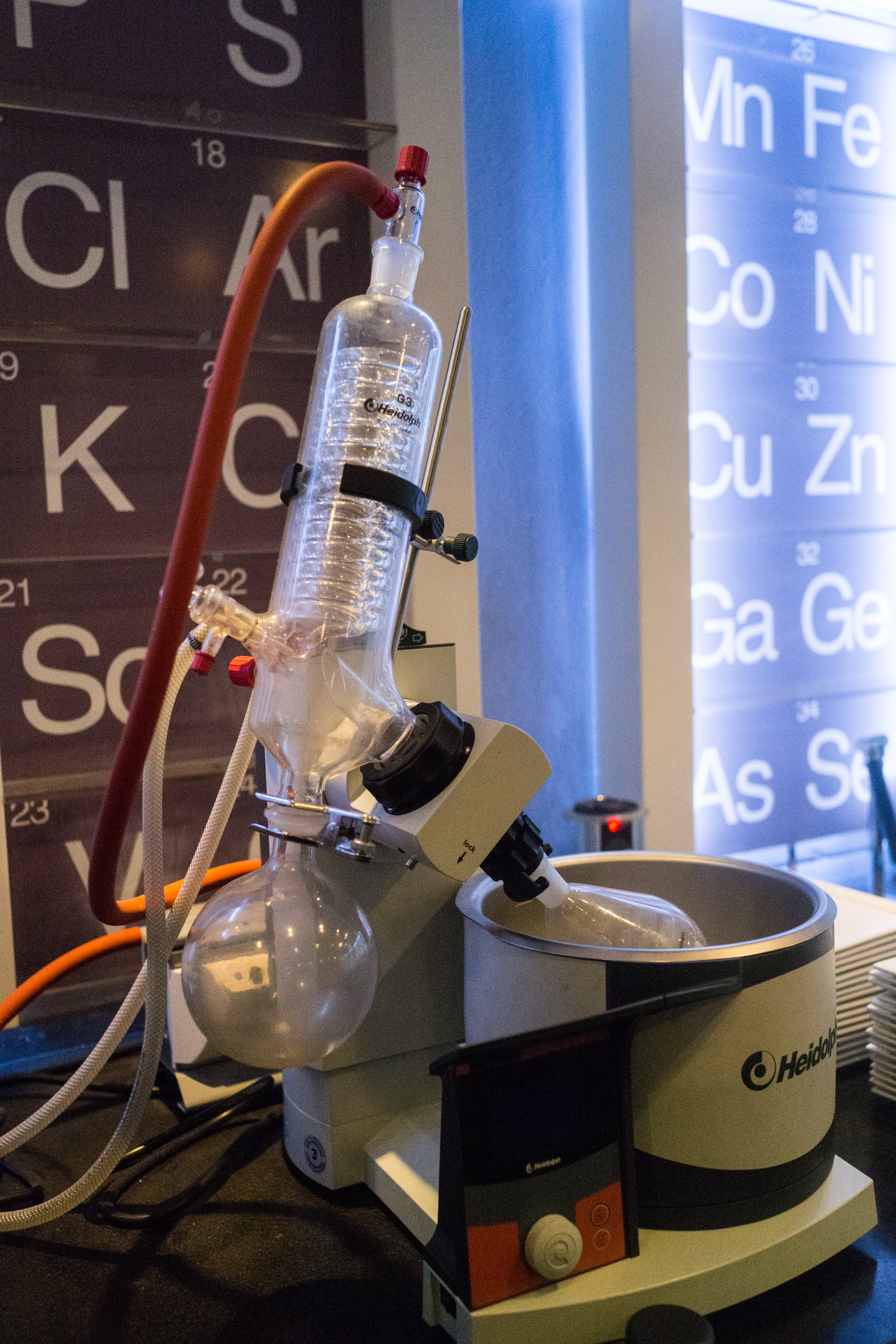
A rotary evaporator at the Moto prep station

Cantu was also a prolific inventor, filing more than 100 patent applications, and signing deals with NASA and Whirlpool for use of his inventions. Inventions included new utensils, a polymer cooking box that allows food to continue cooking after it is removed from the heat source, and an edible printer he called the "food replicator" in homage to Star Trek. Cantu also converted Moto's office into a "state-of-the-art indoor farm to grow vegetables – complete with a vortex aerator". Pete Wells credited Cantu with pioneering the use of intellectual property licensing as a source of income for chefs.

== Media personality ==
In 2007, Cantu appeared on Iron Chef America, defeating Masaharu Morimoto. In the episode, Cantu used a laser to caramelize edible packaging material, and liquid nitrogen to create beet (which was the secret ingredient) "balloons," among other innovations. He returned to the show in 2013, again facing off with Morimoto, this time in a battle of herring. He lost the rematch.

Also in 2007, Cantu was featured in the documentary series Unwrapped and on Dinner: Impossible. In 2009, his restaurant Moto was featured on Anthony Bourdain: No Reservations. He appeared on Good Morning America and twice on The Ellen DeGeneres Show. He was featured on Roadtrip Nation in season six and was twice a guest judge on Hell's Kitchen. Cantu was also featured in the At the Table with ... documentary series and the British science documentary series Horizon. He appeared on the November 27, 2011, episode of CNN's The Next List.

In 2010, Cantu produced and co-hosted a TV show called Future Food on Discovery's Planet Green.

Following his death in 2015, Director/Producer Brett A. Schwartz of StoryScreen directed and produced a feature-length documentary film called Insatiable: The Homaro Cantu Story (2016). Insatiable had its world premiere at SXSW (South By Southwest Film Festival) in March 2016.

== Advocacy ==
Cantu said his mission was "changing the way humans perceive food." He saw his edible paper as a novelty to amuse customers, but also a way to combat world hunger. "My goal with this is to deliver food to the masses that are starving," he declared. "We give them something that's healthy, that has an indefinite shelf life and that is super cheap to produce." He also said it could be used as an alternative to MREs, on long space missions, or in refugee camps.

Cantu was also a prominent proponent of "miracle berries", which he believed could end hunger by allowing people to eat normally unpalatable food and end dependence on processed sugar. On Future Food, Cantu demonstrated this idea by spending a week on a diet of miracle berries and common weeds, grass, and leaves he found in his backyard. He would also regularly donate the berries to cancer patients undergoing chemotherapy to make food more palatable to them.

In 2013, Cantu founded the Trotter Project, a non-profit aimed at providing culinary education to students in poor neighborhoods. He donated up to 250 lunches a day to kids in the Old Irving Park neighborhood who picked them up at Berrista.

== Death ==
On March 19, 2015, former Moto and iNG investor Alexander Espalin of Regal Restaurants, LLC sued Cantu. Espalin alleged that Cantu had misused restaurant funds for personal use and to promote Cantu's cookbook. He also said he did not receive his share of Moto's profits and called for Cantu's ousting from Moto. After Cantu's death, his widow called the lawsuit frivolous and without basis. "It was just another case of someone trying to make a buck off of [Cantu] or take credit for his ideas." Earlier in March, Cantu's pastry chef, Claire Crenshaw, had left Moto to work at another restaurant. In April, Moto's executive chef, Richie Farina, announced plans to also leave the restaurant.

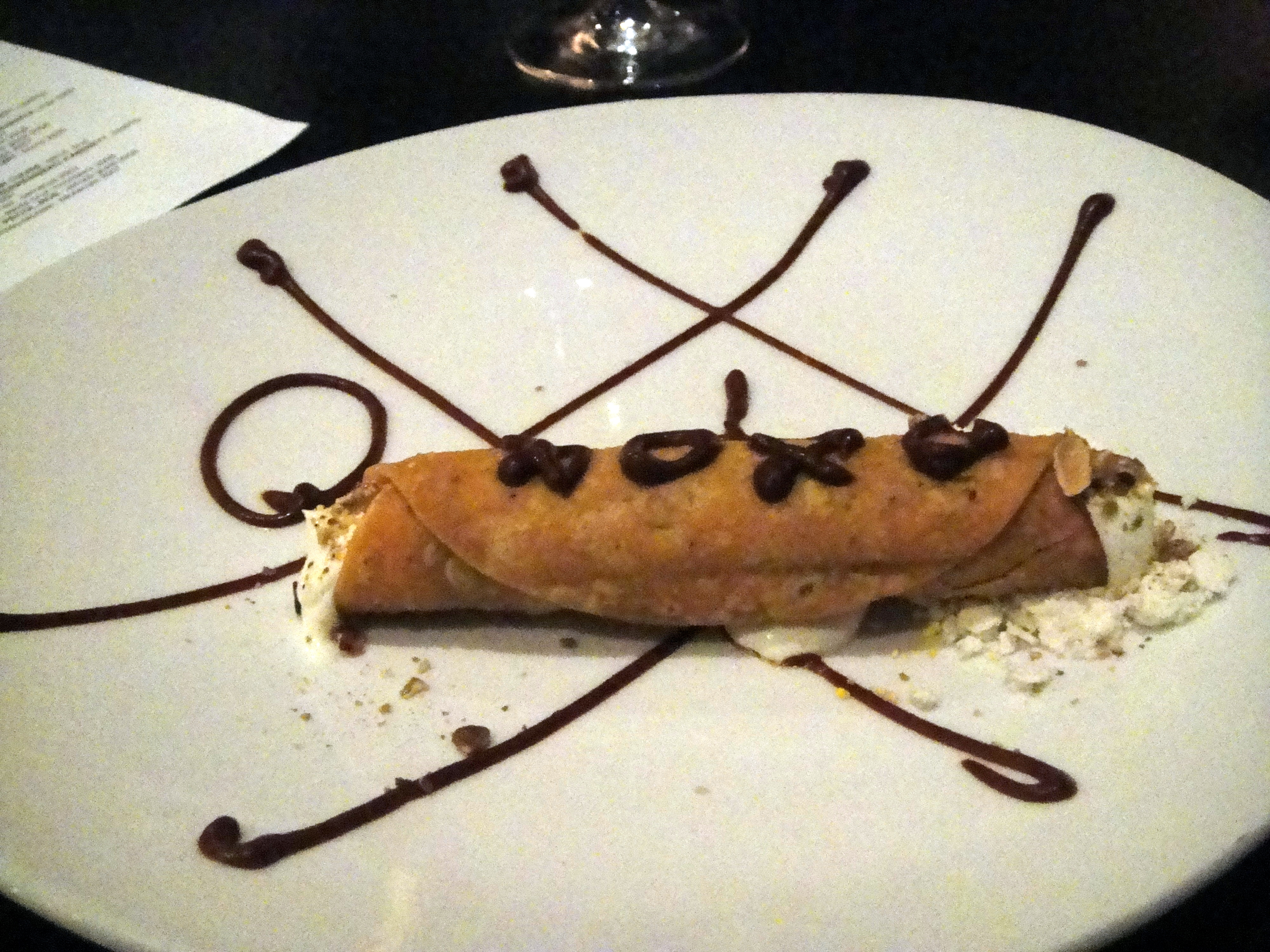
This apparent dessert is actually a savory dish – braised duck in a corn tortilla with sour cream, mole sauce, and jalapeño powder.

On April 14, 2015, Cantu's body was found hanging inside the building he was renovating into Crooked Fork on the Northwest Side of Chicago. After an autopsy on April 15, the Cook County medical examiner's office said the cause of death was asphyxiation by hanging and ruled it a suicide. Cantu did not leave a note and had no history of depression or mental illness.

Cantu's wife said they had had "one of the best conversations of our life the other night about how we were going to fight [Espalin]" and that everything seemed fine. Family friend and fellow chef Matthias Merges said Cantu seemed stressed in recent days, but was shocked by the news of Cantu's death. Architect Rachel Crowl, who designed Berrista and Crooked Fork, said Cantu "was an inventor at heart. Some people might say he was a little crazy, but it was crazy good, excited, positive, laughing. This would be the last thing I would have ever guessed for Omar."

His funeral was held April 17 at St. Viator Church in Chicago.

== Personal life ==
Cantu and his family lived in the Old Irving Park neighborhood of Chicago. He had two daughters and two sisters Angela Cantu and Felicia Cantu.

He was known for his generosity and positive attitude. The New York Times described him "almost compulsively giving [of] his money, his time, [and] his encouragement." Farina said nothing ever appeared to bother Cantu: "He had this persona around him of being Teflon. No matter what someone said, it didn't faze him. He almost seemed invincible. "

== Reputation and legacy ==
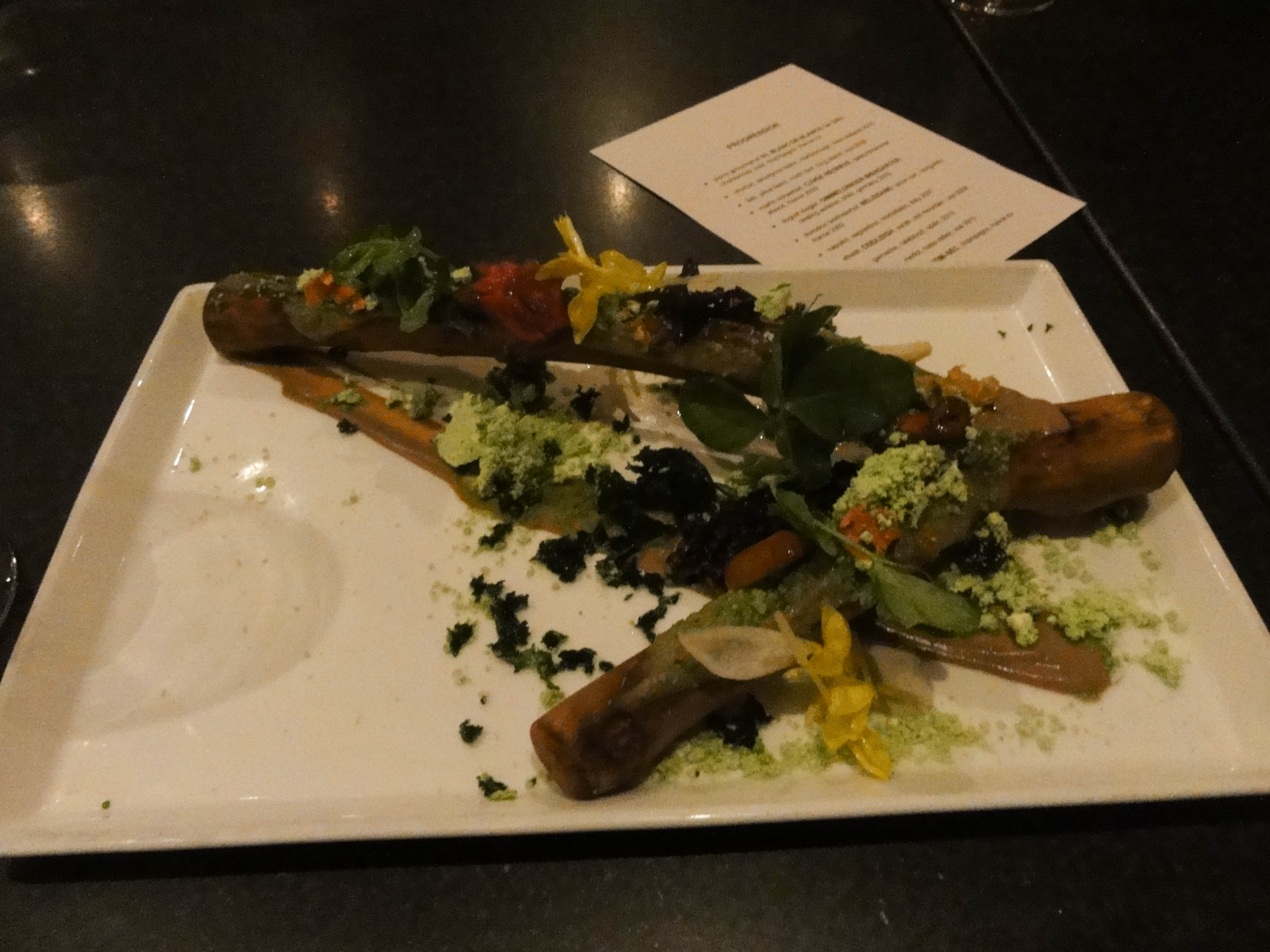
Moto's "Forest Foraging" dish

Cantu was described as a "celebrity chef" and his restaurants as "internationally renowned". In the 2013 guide, Fodor's described him as "a cult figure". He was considered more experimental than even other molecular gastronomers, challenging preconceived notions of what could be considered "food." Fellow chefs compared Cantu to Salvador Dalí or Willy Wonka; The New York Times called him the Buck Rogers of cuisine "blazing a trail to a space-age culinary frontier." A 2005 Fast Company article described Moto as "a temple for science-based gastronomy" and Cantu as "the classic mad scientist, a Stephen Hawking acolyte with a basement filled with gadgets, robots, and gazillions of inventions aching for just a little bit more time and attention." New York based chef Wylie Dufresne described Cantu as "an inventor who accidentally ended up as a chef and [was] returning to being an inventor". The host of Iron Chef described Cantu as the most "wildly original" contestant in the show's history. Food & Wine said his "gonzo innovations place[d] him among the shock troops of American cuisine".

Farina said Cantu had created a "very inspirational environment" at Moto to which he would "always stay connected". A Washington Post obituary said that Cantu had "turned cooking into alchemy through his playful and surprising brand of molecular gastronomy". Elliot said he hoped Cantu would be remembered for his vision to end hunger, saying "no other chef anywhere is thinking about those same kind of things."

Berrista and Moto remained closed for several days in honor of Cantu's memory. Moto reopened on April 18 with a special "celebration of (Cantu's) life" menu featuring contributions by 10–20 former Moto employees. Farina commented "The last thing he would want was for us not to be in the kitchen cooking ... We're going to continue to do what he taught us and what he would want." Although he still plans to leave Moto to start his own restaurant, Farina said he would continue to help out at Moto beyond his planned last day. Moto returned to its regular menu on April 21.

Following his death in 2015, Director/Producer Brett A. Schwartz of StoryScreen directed and produced a feature-length documentary film called Insatiable: The Homaro Cantu Story (2016). Insatiable had its world premiere at SXSW in March 2016. The film includes many scenes shot inside Moto and iNG.

In January 2016, Cantu's widow Katie McGowan announced the sale of Moto to the Alinea Group. McGowan, who inherited Moto after her husband's death, said that the sale was a "bittersweet decision" that came "after deep reflection of the lasting impact" her late husband Cantu had made with his innovative restaurant.
