= The Next List =

- Created by: Joshua Belsky
- Presented by: Sanjay Gupta
- Country of origin: United States
- No. of episodes: 56

Production
- Executive producer: Jim McGinnis
- Running time: 30 minutes

Original release
- Network: CNN
- Release: November 13, 2011 – July 27, 2013

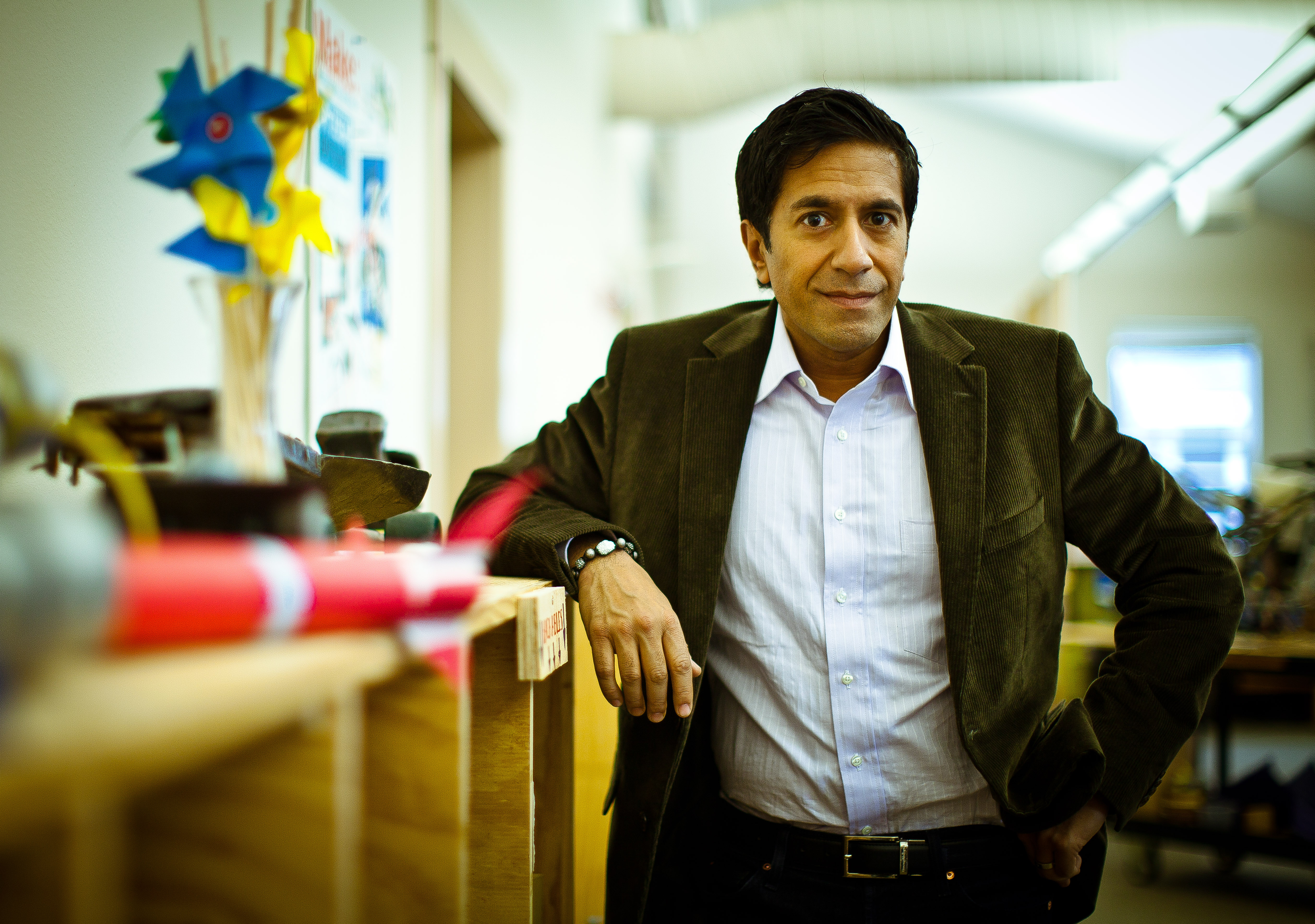
Dr. Sanjay Gupta at MAKE headquarters

The Next List is a 30-minute weekend television program on CNN. It aired every Saturday afternoon at 2:30 pm ET/PT and was hosted by Dr. Sanjay Gupta.

Each week, the show profiled innovators, visionaries, and agents of change from around the world who are steadily mapping the course to the future with their new ideas. Each half-hour episode featured one 'Next Lister' and told their story about what they are doing to change the world, what challenges they faced, and the innovative approaches they have developed to overcome obstacles. Next Listers are creative, passionate, and embracers of opportunity and change.

The show premiered on November 13, 2011 and featured cyber-illusionist Marco Tempest. CNN announced cancellation in September 2013.

== Format ==
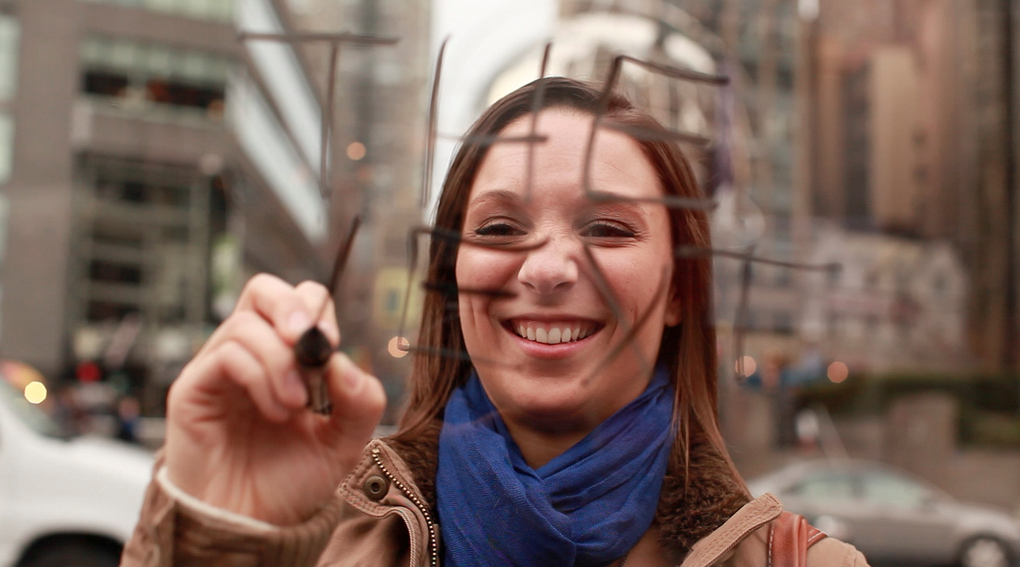
Writing "The Next List" using mirror-writing technique.

The show was shot exclusively on DSLR using the Canon 5D Mark II camera giving it its signature cinematic look. In every episode each Next Lister is asked to 'sign' their name to the 'list' by writing their name backwards on a window of glass or Plexiglas. The sign-in is taped for use in the show and pays homage to Leonardo da Vinci who was known for his mirror writing and was a great historical innovator.

The Next List blog featured online commentary from those profiled on the show, as well as the latest on innovation and creative thinkers from around the world.

== Episodes ==
| Air Date | Profile | Description |
|---|---|---|
| November 13, 2011 | Marco Tempest | A 'cyber-illusionist' (magician/performance artist) who combines video, computer graphics and other technology of the moment with the ideas and technology of magic. He stars in the television series "The Virtual Magician." |
| November 20, 2011 | Christopher Brosius | A former NYC cab driver turned self-taught perfumer and founder of CB I hate Perfume, now based in Brooklyn, New York. His award-winning scents include "In the Library," "Burning Maple Leaves," and "Snow." |
| November 27, 2011 | Homaro Cantu | A chef, inventor, entrepreneur, and molecular gastronomist. He owns iNG, Cantu Designs, and Moto in Chicago, known for its use of 'high-tech' food created with edible paper, centrifuges, lasers, and liquid nitrogen. |
| December 4, 2011 | Heather Knight | A 'social' roboticist who analyzes how people relate to technology by creating robots that can interact with humans. Her robot, named Data, is a comedian with whom she performs a stand-up routine. |
| December 12, 2011 | Tristan Eaton | A former troubled-teen turned prolific artist and toy designer, who creates both elaborate street murals and designs for brands like Dell and Puma. He is the founder of Thunderdog Studios, a creative agency and toy brand based in New York City. |
| December 18, 2011 | Scott Snibbe | An interactive artist who uses walls, floors, and ceilings as interactive canvases. He is the founder of Snibbe Interactive and Scott Snibbe studio and has also created music applications that deliver full, all-sensory music experience. |
| January 15, 2012 | Jake Shimabukuro | A Hawaii-born ukulele virtuoso who is re-defining conventional ideas about his instrument through his eclectic approach to sound. His YouTube videos have garnered millions of hits worldwide. |
| January 22, 2012 | Bjarke Ingels | A Danish architect who views his work as a way of contributing to society, re-imagining the future, and creating possibilities for human life. He believes in 'pragmatic utopian architecture' and heads the Bjarke Ingels Group. |
| January 29, 2012 | Ubaldo Vitali | A fourth-generation master silversmith, conservator, and scholar who uses centuries old practices to create unparalleled works of art. He is a 2011 recipient of the MacArthur Fellowship and advocates appreciation of hand-crafted objects in a world saturated with technology. |
| February 19, 2012 | Dale Dougherty | A founder of MAKE Magazine and Maker Faire who believes that everyone has the potential to make things that improve our world. He is passionate about fostering a new generation of 'makers' who are creative, innovative, and curious. |
| February 26, 2012 | Yves Behar | A designer, entrepreneur, and founder of Fuseproject. His work includes the wireless speaker Jambox and the laptop for One Laptop Per Child. He spends nearly one-third of his time on non-profit work, believing that great design should be accessible to everyone. |
| March 4, 2012 | Dan Ogola | A social-entrepreneur who rose from poverty and established a thriving community health care system, the Matibabu Foundation, in his native Kenya. He believes that health is integral to prosperity and the realization of potential. |
| March 11, 2012 | Syyn Labs | Self-described geeks who are called a "drinking group with an art problem." Using technology, art, and science, they create extraordinary art, commercials and videos that look practically impossible to execute. Currently headed by Adam Sadowsky, the group is responsible for OK Go's "This Too Shall Pass" video. |
| March 18, 2012 | Blue School | A nonprofit preschool and elementary school founded by the members of the Blue Man Group and their wives in 2006. The school employs a "co-constructive approach" to learning in which the students have a hand in directing and developing their own curriculum through inquiry and exploration. |
| March 25, 2012 | Hugh Herr | Engineer, rock climber, and biophysicist whose legs were amputated after suffering severe frostbite while mountain-climbing. Using special prostheses that he designed himself, he was able to climb again. Now he is the head of the Biomechatronics research group at the MIT Media Lab and is the holder of more than 10 patents in rehabilitation science. |
| April 1, 2012 | Jose Gomez-Marquez | A medical device designer for MIT's Little Devices lab, which "uses toy parts to create inexpensive medical devices for developing countries." He is interested in "enabling technologies and rapid prototyping approaches to health" and helps create DIY medical kits for doctors and nurses in the field. |
| April 8, 2012 | David J. Peterson | Creator of the Dothraki language in the television show Game of Thrones. He is President of the Language Creation Society, a community for 'conlangers' or people who create constructed languages or 'conlangs.' He believes "language users use their own experience to encode life as they see it." |
| April 15, 2012 | Jane McGonigal | World-renowned game designer who insists playing games for an hour a day can change your life. Gaming, Jane says, produces powerful emotions and social relationships that can really change lives, and potentially even change the world. Scientists call it "game transfer" phenomenon: what we think and feel in games starts to spill over into our real lives. |
| April 29, 2012 | Jad Abumrad | Co-host of the WNYC Radio show called Radiolab. "Radio host" may not be the best title for Abumrad. He's an aural filmmaker rapidly changing the way we understand the world. |
| May 6, 2012 | Quirky.com (Ben Kaufman) | A start-up website that gives would-be inventors a place to go with their ideas. Ben Kaufman and his "Quirky" process are shaking up the way consumer products get to store shelves, giving people the power to choose what they buy. But most important, he's providing creative people a platform to launch their invention ideas…a place to go when that "light bulb" moment strikes. |
| May 13, 2012 | Andrew Coté | Urban beekeeper and activist. From the heights of New York's most luxurious hotels to the far reaches of the African bush, Coté is spreading his fascination with bees to people throughout the world. |
| May 27, 2012 | Sarah Parcak | Sarah Parcak has been dubbed the "real-life Indiana Jones," but she prefers to be called a "space archaeologist." From her lab at the University of Alabama in Birmingham, Parcak analyzes infrared satellite imagery to map lost cities thought gone forever. |
| June 10, 2012 | Taylor Wilson | The youngest person in the world to build a nuclear fusion reactor. He has also gained national acclaim for creating a counter terror device that sniffs out nuclear material in cargo containers and building a prototype for a device that generates medical isotopes – a feat that could make diagnosing and treating cancer cheaper and more widely accessible to patients. |
| June 17, 2012 | Cameron Carpenter | A talented and nontraditional musician who is reinventing the organ (music) and bringing it to the masses through his creation of his own digital organ that can go wherever he does. |
| July 1, 2012 | Simon Hauger | A revolutionary teacher who started Philadelphia's "Sustainability Workshop," a program for inner-city high school seniors that is organized around projects rather than traditional curriculum. Students built electric go-karts solar charging stations, and design energy-efficiency business plans. |
| July 8, 2012 | Ayah Bdeir | An engineer and artist who created littleBits, a pre-engineered electronic module that snaps together with tiny magnets to create different kinds of displays. Using littleBits, which have been called "the next-generation Lego," she aims to change the way kids learn about science, engineering and basic circuits. |
| September 9, 2012 | Brian O'Hanlon | The founder and president of Open Blue, the world's largest open-ocean fish farm. O'Hanlon learned long ago that the world's supply of wild-caught seafood could never keep up with ever-increasing demand. He set his sights on solving the problem. His mission is clear: “Our whole goal is to provide a more natural, healthier environment for the fish.” |
| September 16, 2012 | Juan Sostheim | A pioneer in scalable, sustainable living. As founder of Rancho Margot, a luxury eco-tourist resort, educational facility and organic farm in Costa Rica, he's demonstrating that "living off the grid" is not only possible but practical for large-scale communities. Sostheim fuels the kitchen with methane gas from cows and pigs, generates his own electricity and creates bio-fuels. |
| September 23, 2012 | David Eagleman | A neuroscientist who studies time perception, vision, social neuroscience and its correlation to the legal system. His recent perspectives on the Aurora, Colorado movie theatre shootings, aimed to prove and disprove theories about psychotic and psychopathic behaviors. He directs the Eagleman Laboratory for Perception and Action at Baylor College of Medicine. |
| September 30, 2012 | Susanne Heisse | A former East German political prisoner turned fashion designer, who innovated Ecobricks, a plastic bottle stuffed with inorganic trash. In collaboration with Peace Corps and charities such as Hug it Forward, she uses ecobricks to build homes and schools in Guatemala, a trend now spreading throughout Central America. |
| October 7, 2012 | Jennifer Pahlka | Founder and executive director of Code for America, a nonprofit that creates networks between governments, web developers, designers and entrepreneurs to make cities more efficient. |
| November 11, 2012 | Jim Newton | Founder of TechShop, a community-based workshop that provides tools for members to build products based on their dreams. He says, "I find that most people are very passionate about something specific they want to make, but they don't know how to do it." Several innovations were started at the company, one of which includes a portable body warmer for premature infants in developing countries. |
| November 18, 2012 | Nalini Nadkarni | Forest ecologist and professor at the Evergreen State College in Olympia, Washington. She is a self-proclaimed "nature evangelist" and a pioneer in tree canopy research, which is the study of treetops. This involves vertical rock climbing in an effort to observe the biodiversity of organisms who live in forest canopies. |
| November 25, 2012 | Dave Arnold | As the Director of Technology at the International Culinary Center in New York City, Arnold uses science to reinterpret traditional cooking methods. Liquid nitrogen and red hot pokers are among many of his techniques used to make cocktails. Without any formal culinary training he's difficult to summarize; he describes himself as a "cook, bartender, teacher, writer." Despite his many titles, he is undoubtedly one of the most cutting-edge instructors, cooks and bartenders in the country. |
| December 2, 2012 | Max Little | Applied mathematician and project director at the Parkinson's Voice Initiative, Little can detect Parkinson's disease by listening to your voice. All he needs is 10 seconds. Using algorithms to analyze voice recordings, neurological tests detect Parkinson's disease before symptoms arise, and determine what steps can be taken to limit its progression. |
| December 9, 2012 | Neri Oxman | Designer, architect, and artist Neri Oxman is pushing the limits of what it means to erect a building and believes one day soon we'll be able to "print" our buildings using 3-D printers. |
| January 6, 2013 | Jim McKelvey | Co-founder of Square, the mobile-payment system. An engineer, entrepreneur, artist, community activist, environmentalist, and citizen of the world, McKelvey is working on creating a new economic model to help keep the struggling publishing industry alive. |
| January 13, 2013 | Greg Gage | Neuroscientist, entrepreneur, engineer, teacher, and co-founder of Backyard Brains. Greg Gage invented the SpikerBox, a small DIY kit that brings cool hands-on experiments to schools so students can see and hear brain signals, or "spikes", from the living neurons of insects like cockroaches. |
| January 27, 2013 | Skip Rizzo | Clinical psychologist Skip Rizzo uses the latest in gaming technology to treat post traumatic stress disorder (PTSD) in war veterans. |
| February 10, 2013 | Jay Keasling | Synthetic biology pioneer Jay Keasling engineers single cell organisms to produce biofuels, medicines, and even cosmetic products from simple ingredients like sugar cane and grass. |
| February 17, 2013 | Ed Lu | NASA astronaut/space explorer Ed Lu charts the unknown, mapping asteroids to prevent future impacts. |
| February 24, 2013 | Diana Eng | Project Runway alumnus and tech-fashionista Diana Eng combines math and science smarts to create beautiful, wearable pieces of art. Utilizing anything from mathematical formulas to flower cell composition as inspiration for her designs, Eng hopes to broaden minds as well as fashion decisions. Diana Eng was filmed sourcing goods in this episode at CJS Sales: Crafts, Jewelry, Supplies (Vintage Warehouse) within the Garment Center of New York city and talks during the interview about how she goes there for inspiration. This episode of the Next List can be still be seen on both Diana Eng's website as well as on YouTube. |
| March 3, 2013 | Saul Griffith | Cloth robots and soft machines are only some of the many curiously innovative ideas coming out of Saul Griffith's Otherlab, an organization that is revolutionizing the way we think about renewable energy sources like solar power and natural gases. |
| March 10, 2013 | Miguel Nicolelis | A neurobiologist and professor at Duke University, Miguel Nicolelis utilizes the latest in brain–computer interface (a technology that enables humans and other animals to interact with computers and other artificial devices using only their thoughts) with the intention of eventually enabling those suffering from paralysis to walk using mind-controlled prosthetics. |
| March 24, 2013 | Leslie Saxon | Leslie Saxon, founder of the University of Southern California's Center for Body Computing (CBC), is a pioneer in digital medicine. Saxon envisions a future where doctors and patients fully utilize technology to monitor and share healthy information. Her techniques so far include smart phone apps that can notify users of an impending heart attack or deterioration in heart functions. |
| April 7, 2013 | NCAA Tournament Special | In conjunction with the NCAA basketball tournament, The Next List profiles five outstandingly innovative NCAA undergrad students who are already making a difference in their perspective fields. Jean Sack of MIT manages a class project that aims to drastically extend the life of underwater autonomous vehicles. Riley Ennis of Dartmouth College pioneers new ways to boost the human immune system with the hopes of eventually eliminating cancer. Sabha Salama and Karina Casias of University of Southern California founded Mural Project LA in an effort to improve the preservation and awareness of the murals around LA. Param Jaggi of Vanderbilt University is developing inexpensive technology to eventually eliminate carbon footprints and damaging effects on the environment. |
| April 27, 2013 | Hugh Herr | In light of the horrific events at the Boston Marathon on April 15, The Next List revisits Hugh Herr (a.k.a. MIT's "Bionic Man"). MIT Media Lab's Biomechatronics Group's new partnership with the Mass Technology Leadership Council and No Barriers is working to ensure that each amputee victim receives the technological and therapeutic assistance necessary to lead full, active lives. |
| May 11, 2013 | Yosef Abramowitz | Yosef Abramowitz – human rights activist, solar power pioneer, three-time Nobel Peace Prize nominee, and co-founder of Arava Power Company – is bringing affordable energy to some of the most deprived populations on the planet. |
| May 18, 2013 | Jim Patell | Jim Patell – Stanford Graduate School of Business professor and founder of the groundbreaking graduate course Design for Extreme Affordability – uses interdisciplinary training to encourage students to forge inexpensive, efficient methods of enabling the world's poorest to eventually overcome poverty. His students' designs include lifesaving gadgets such as a special sleeping bag for premature infants and a device to treat childhood pneumonia. |
| June 1, 2013 | Francesco Clark | After an accident left him paralyzed, Francesco Clark has used his seemingly tragic circumstances as the catalyst for one of the beauty industry's most innovative skin care lines, Clark's Botanicals. While running a successfully "blooming" business, Francesco also participates in pioneering – and even controversial – breakthroughs in stem cell research and paralysis therapy in the hopes of someday walking again. |
| June 8, 2013 | Izhar Gafni | Self-described cycling enthusiast Izhar Gafni combines ancient origami techniques and his own secret concoction of glue and varnish to create bicycles made entirely of cardboard. Gafni hopes that these inexpensive yet efficient methods and materials will soon revolutionize the way we "live green", particularly in economically struggling countries. |
| June 15, 2013 | Graham Hill | Believing that a simpler, less cluttered lifestyle free of "stuff" makes people happier, Graham Hill founded LifeEdited.com. Hill's startup encourages minimalist living, particularly in growing urban environments. |
| June 22, 2013 | Bre Pettis | An advocate of easy-access to affordable, cutting-edge technology, Bre Pettis founded MakerBot, which enables people from a variety of industries and backgrounds to access the latest in 3D printing. |
| June 29, 2013 | Jim Richards | Utilizing his skills as a scientist at University of Delaware human performance lab, Jim Richards uses motion capture data to study the movements of ice skaters, making this beautiful yet injury-ridden sport safer. |
| July 20, 2013 | Dan Selec | Dan Selec is changing the way people with Autism live and function in society. He is CEO and founder of the nonPareil Institute, a hybrid school and software company that teaches people on the Autism spectrum to write and develop apps, video games, and iBooks. |
| July 27, 2013 | Archie Kalepa | Archie Kalepa utilizes his love and knowledge of the ocean and Hawaiian culture to save lives off the busy tourist coast of Maui. Archie fuses tradition with innovation, combining his waterman skills with new inventions like an inflatable surfboard to create faster and more effective lifesaving tools. |
