= Ubaldo Vitali =

American silversmith and conservator (born 1944)

- Born: 1944 (age 81–82)
- Education: Sapienza University of Rome
- Occupation: silversmith
- Awards: MacArthur Fellow

Ubaldo Vitali (born 1944) is an American silversmith and conservator. He is a 2011 MacArthur Fellow.

== Life ==
He studied at the Liceo Artistico Ripetta, the Sapienza University of Rome, and the Accademia di Belle Arti, Rome. He moved to the United States in 1967. His workshop is at 188 Hilton Avenue, Maplewood, New Jersey.

His work has appeared in the Newark Museum, the Smithsonian American Art Museum, the Yale University Art Gallery, and the Museum of Fine Arts, Houston.

Vitali was featured on a January 29, 2012 episode of CNN's The Next List.
