= Marco Tempest =

Swiss magician based in New York City (born 1964)

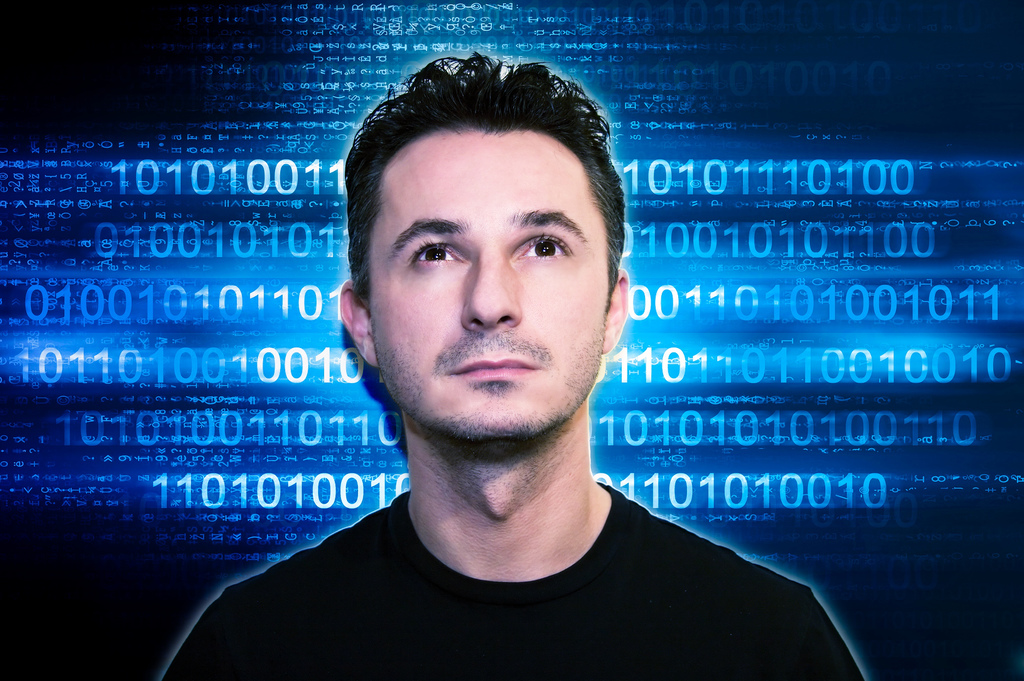
- Born: December 3, 1964 (age 61); Zurich, Switzerland
- Occupations: Magician, Illusionist, Director, Producer
- Website: www.marcotempest.com

Marco Tempest (born December 3, 1964) is a Swiss magician based in Zurich, Switzerland. He uses interactive multimedia and computer graphics in his illusions and presentations. He starred in the eight-part television series The Virtual Magician.

== Career ==
Marco Tempest is a Creative Technology Leader who combines emerging technologies with compelling narratives to accelerate innovation, particularly in space and advanced technology sectors. While initially known as a magician/performance artist who combined video, computer graphics and technology with the ideas of magic, his career has evolved to focus on strategic technology communication and innovation leadership. His early television series The Virtual Magician aired in some 49 markets worldwide.

Since 2018, Tempest has served as Creative Technologist & Consultant at NASA Jet Propulsion Laboratory, where he transforms complex space technologies into compelling demonstration narratives and leads strategic communications for advanced technology development. In 2024, he became Director of Creative Technology & Innovation at ETH Zurich’s Space division, guiding cross-departmental teams in transforming academic research into orbital missions. Previously, he worked as Senior Innovation Consultant at Woven by Toyota (2022–2024) and as Accenture Luminary and XR Lead Consultant (2017–2022), scaling enterprise innovation programs from concept to global deployment.

Tempest maintains significant academic engagements, serving as a Director’s Fellow Alumni at the MIT Media Lab, where he co-lectured the MAS.S65 course on technology innovation and developed frameworks for translating research into practical applications. He has also worked as a Strategic Communications Consultant for the Mohamed bin Zayed University of Artificial Intelligence, creating immersive experiences showcasing AI research at global events like COP28.

A native of Zurich, Switzerland, Tempest won numerous awards as a youngster for his use of illusion with contemporary choreography. While still in his teens, he became one of Europe's top professional magicians as part of the duo United Artists. Collaborating with Martin Cottet, Tempest presented an unusual four-hands "flash act" in showrooms and on television throughout Europe and Asia.

Tempest has become a prominent thought leader in technology innovation, delivering seven TED talks on technology innovation and future vision. He has served as a cultural leader at the World Economic Forum in Davos and is a regular keynote speaker at major academic and technology conferences worldwide, including events for organizations like TTI Vanguard, the Milken Institute and EmTech MIT Technology Review.

== Style ==
In 1989, Tempest began developing his own style with visual and conceptual "dance magic". His show "Key of the Imagination" incorporated a distinctive Eastern style including fans, origami, Kabuki streamers and boomerangs. Tempest was soon touring worldwide, picking up such honors as New York's World Cup of Magic and Madrid's World Championship of Magic Award.

Tempest's interest in digital technologies generated his unusual performance style, in which an exploration of illusion arts merged with interactive high-tech animation. The result was his "NeXT Wave of Magic," which premiered in Zurich in December 1991. Tempest's use of a 32-screen video wall and the latest in techno-music earned him star spots in television variety shows, commercials, performing arts centers and corporate events in the U.S., Japan, France, Monte Carlo, Germany, Spain, and the UK. His ability to transform logos and products into 3-D animatronics put him much in demand on the corporate market, which became a major focus of his work for the next 15 years.

== Performances ==
Tempest's act has been featured in casino shows in the U.S. and around the world, including Dreamstore at Monte Carlo Sporting Club, Magiquest at Harrah's Casino in Atlantic City in 1990, and The Good Time Variety Show at The Showboat Casino Hotel, Atlantic City in 1992. In the corporate realm, he has made numerous appearances on behalf of Panasonic, Apple, Lucent Technologies, Johnson & Johnson, I.B.M., Toyota, Silicon Graphics, Pfizer, Cisco, Microsoft and many others at corporate events and trade shows since 1991 all around the world.

Tempest created his first full-evening touring show, The Magic of Marco Tempest, which completed a 12-week touring engagement traveling to major theatres throughout Switzerland, Belgium and Holland in the fall of 1995. The show combined traditional illusion techniques with the latest virtual reality and computer animation techniques, bringing technical special effects to live performance which had, until then, been available only to film and video audiences.

In 1996, Tempest moved to New York City, where he continues to live and work today. He performs extensively in the corporate market, on television and on the internet.

In 1998 he was awarded France's top honor for magicians, the Mandrake D’Or.

He began the development of and marketing for his first 13-part television series The Virtual Magician – Keeper of Secrets, beginning in 2000, and the series ran for two seasons (2003–2004) in 49 different markets around the world, and continues in syndication in many of those markets today. In the series, Tempest played a magician from a future time when technology rules and magic and mystery have died. Using his own secret technologies, he traveled into the digital archives of time and retrieved the greatest mysteries from the past. He brought those mysteries into our time and performed them for people in everyday situations – on the street, in restaurants, etc. The theme and main character of The Virtual Magician have been carried forward in Tempest's more recent television appearances around the world, particularly in his Magic of Marco Tempest television specials in Japan (2006–2007) and Korea (spring 2007).

On November 13, 2011, Tempest was featured on an episode of CNN's The Next List.

=== Phonecam Magic ===
In 2006, Tempest began posting “Phonecam” magic on YouTube and other popular viral video sites. Initially, the postings were a challenge in response to magicians on television shows who had used either special camera tricks, editing, or digital effects to present magic which was only possible in that medium. The rules are:

1. Shoot the magic on a phonecam in one take. No cuts, no edits.
2. The magic must be original – nothing from a book or that other magicians are doing.

Tempest's first phonecam trick, in which he caused a borrowed umbrella to shrink visibly on camera, was later picked up and featured on The Tonight Show with Jay Leno, and a later version earned him a spot on HBO’s Comedy Festival shot at Caesars Palace in Las Vegas.

=== Magic Projection ===
Tempest does a performance holding a blank canvas that moving images are projected onto; the images adapt and change to the moving of the canvas.

== Awards ==
- NASA Honor Award for work on Ventilator Intervention Technology during COVID-19
- XR Hall of Fame for expanding possibilities of XR as a medium
- Academy of Magical Arts Special Fellowship
- 2011 World Technology Award for Arts
- 2010 International Magicians Society Merlin Award for Best Contemporary Magician
- 2009 World Magic Award - Best Contemporary Magic
- 2005 23rd Loie Award for Outstanding Achievement in the Art of Magic
- 2003 Two Telly Awards for The Virtual Magician television series
- 2002 Two Aegis Awards for The Virtual Magician television series
- 2002 Two Axiem Awards for The Virtual Magician television series
- 2001 Five Omni Awards for The Virtual Magician television series
- 1998 Mandrake d'Or Award, Societe de la Magie, Paris
- 1987 1st Place at the World Cup of Magic / New York Magic Symposium, New York City
