= Blue School =

Former independent school in New York City, US

Coordinates: 40.70791°N 74.002567°W

Location
- 241 Water Street (Water St Campus); 156 William Street (William St Campus); New York, New York; United States

Information
- Type: Independent, progressive, coeducational
- Established: 2006
- Closed: 2023
- Grades: pK–8
- Enrollment: approx. 300
- Campus: Urban
- Color: Blue
- Website: www.blueschool.org

Blue School was a progressive independent school located in New York City's Lower Manhattan.

The school offered early-childhood classes for children as young as two years old, as well as kindergarten and elementary school classes that extend through sixth grade as of the 2015–16 school year. Middle school classes began in the 2015–16 school year and continued through eighth grade since 2017. Blue School shut down at the conclusion of the 2022–2023 school year.

== Educational approach ==
Blue School developed an education model which combines elements of other approaches and unique elements of its own. It offered a "dynamically balanced education for seriously curious young people" age 2 through grade 8.

The school's advisory board included Lawrence Cohen, Ph.D., Sir Ken Robinson, Ph.D., and Dan Siegel, M.D.

Cohen described the school as "more about creativity than control".

== History ==
Blue School was first established as an informal parent-run playgroup by the founders of the Blue Man Group and their wives when their children approached pre-school age.

In September 2007, the playgroup opened as "Blue Man Creativity Center". In September 2018, over 300 students were enrolled in pre-primary, primary, and middle school programs for children ages 2 through 8th grade.

== Facilities ==
The parent-run playgroup was initially located in a building housing Blue Man Group. As the playgroup grew into a formal education program, the school relocated to accommodate increasing numbers of faculty, staff, and students. In September 2008 the school opened a new space on Avenue B, and in September 2010 it relocated to a building on Astor Place previously owned by Cooper Union. In November 2010, Blue School announced that it was acquiring a permanent home and would relocate there in September 2011.

The school's building at 241 Water Street, one block south of the Brooklyn Bridge and one block north of the Schermerhorn Row Block, was originally built in 1799 by Peter Schermerhorn to house a ships chandlery business. The building was rebuilt and significantly enlarged in 1991 by James Polshek and Richard Olcott, and served as the headquarters of the Seamen's Church Institute of New York and New Jersey until the Institute relocated to Newark in 2010. The building's renovation included design services by David Rockwell of Rockwell Group, a member of the school's advisory board and designer of the nearby Imagination Playground.

In October 2012, Hurricane Sandy caused extensive damage to the Seaport area, flooding the first floor of school with four to five feet of water and forcing it to close for a week while repairs were made and electrical power was restored.

In March 2014, Blue School announced that it had secured the adjacent building at 233 Water Street to provide expansion space as it adds a middle school program. The new building was renovated with classrooms, science and arts spaces, and a rooftop garden and play space, and opened for the 2015–16 school year.

In December 2016, Blue School acquired additional space nearby at 156 William Street, which opened in September 2018. It was later shut down after the school suffered from significant financial losses.

== In media ==
The association with the Blue Man Group has brought the school some national media attention, including stories by Time, NBC's Today Show, and National Public Radio. Local stories appeared in The Villager and the New York Post.

The school attracted some controversy after a front-page article about the school in The New York Times called attention to the school's tuition rates. Although the school's tuition is "right in the middle" of what other private schools in New York City charge, some readers outside of the city were shocked by the cost.

Blue School's media visibility has also made it a target for attacks by conservative educators, who are critical of its focus on creativity and the elements it takes from the Reggio Emilia approach to education. A June 2012 article in The New York Post criticized the school's approach and reported that parents removed their children from the school, claiming that the children weren't learning how to read.

In April 2012, The New York Times published a feature on how Blue School integrates scientific research about child development in the classroom, writing that "the school has become a kind of national laboratory for integrating cognitive neuroscience and cutting-edge educational theory into curriculum, professional development and school design." Blue School was also featured on a March 18, 2012 episode of CNN's The Next List.

In March 2014, New York magazine published school vaccination rates that reflected incomplete reporting for the 2012–13 school year due to damage of student medical records in the flooding from Hurricane Sandy.

In 2022, Blue School employees voted to unionize but were met with anti-union tactics by school leadership, who failed to recognize the legal union.

== See also ==
- Education in New York City
