= Charles Wallis =

Charles or Charlie Wallis may refer to:

- Charles Edward Wallis (1869–1927), physician and dental surgeon in London
- Charles Glenn Wallis (died 1944), American poet and translator
- Charlie Wallis (cricketer) (born 1991), English cricketer
- Charles Wallis (MP), for Duleek
- Charles Braithwaite Wallis, List of ambassadors of the United Kingdom to Panama

== See also ==
- Charles Wallace (disambiguation)
