= Param Jaggi =

American inventor and CEO

- Born: April 18, 1994 (age 32)
- Education: Vanderbilt University
- Scientific career
- Fields: Physical Sciences

Param Jaggi (born April 18, 1994) is an American inventor and the chief executive officer of Hatch Technologies. Previously, he was founder and CEO of EcoViate. He is known for building Algae Mobile, a device that converts carbon dioxide emitted from a car into oxygen. Jaggi was featured in Forbes 30 under 30 in 2011 and 2012.

He was named an INK Fellow and participated in the 2013 INK Conference. Jaggi was also a speaker at TEDxRedmond in 2013 and is on the board of USA Science and Engineering Festival. In 2013, he was featured in CNN's The Next List.

== Early life and education ==
Jaggi’s parents encouraged him to pursue science since he was a child. As a child, he pursued projects related to environment and world problems. After completing his education from Plano East High School, he joined Austin College in 2011. When he was 15, he began working with alternative energy sources and a year later he started working in a lab at University of Texas, Dallas. He has also worked at a patent law office. In 2012, he attended Vanderbilt University where he became a member of Phi Gamma Delta fraternity and earned a Bachelor of Arts in Environmental Sustainability and Economics.

== Inventions ==
He started working with environmental and energy technologies at the age of 13. When he was 14, he built an algae-based bio-reactor. In 2013, he started working on a thermo-voltaic system that would harness wasted heat from the motor vehicle.

=== Algae Mobile ===
Jaggi built the first model of Algae Mobile, a device that converts carbon dioxide emitted from a car into oxygen, in 2008. He got the idea of building the device when he was learning to drive. In 2009, he filed a patent for it, which was approved in 2013. Since 2009, he has made different models of Algae Mobile. In February 2010, he won top prize in the Beal Bank Dallas Regional Science and Engineering Fair at Fair Park for Algae Mobile

In 2011, he participated in ExxonMobil Texas Science and Engineering Fair and qualified to advance to the International Science and Engineering Fair (ISEF) At the ISEF, he won the Environmental Protection Agency's Patrick H. Hurd Sustainability Award for Algae Mobile 3.

== Personal life ==
Jaggi is of Indian descent, and currently resides in Washington, D.C. His father, Pawan Jaggi is an entrepreneur and serves as the director of EcoViate. His brother, Parakh Jaggi is a Software Engineer and serves as CTO of Climate Benefits!

== Awards and honors ==
- 2011 - Nominated for Dallas Morning News Texan of the Year.
- 2011 - EPA's Sustainability Award at Intel International Science Fair
- 2011 - Featured in Popular Science 'Top 10 High School Inventors'
- 2011 - Featured in Mental Floss' Whiz Kids: 5 Amazing Young Inventors
- 2011, 2012 - Featured in Forbes 30 Under 30's energy category
