= Charles L. Wallace =

American architect

- Born: July 5, 1871
- Died: February 12, 1949 (aged 77); Joliet, Illinois
- Occupation: Architect
- Practice: Hoen, Webster, and Wallace

Charles L. Wallace (July 5, 1871 – February 12, 1949) was an Irish-born architect. He helped designed over 100 buildings primarily in Joliet and Chicago.

== Notable commissions ==
=== Chicago ===
- St. Anselm Church
- St. Clotilde Church
- St. Dorothy Church
- St. Margaret of Scotland Church
- New Mount Pilgrim Missionary Baptist Church (formally St. Mel Church)
- St. Viator Church

=== Joliet ===
- Charles L. Wallace House
- St. Joseph's Church
- St. Mary Nativity Church
- St. Patrick's Church
- St. Raymond's Church (original church)

=== Other Projects in Illinois ===
- Immaculate Conception Church (Elmhurst)
- St. Alphonsus Church (Lemont)
- St. Joseph Church (Manhattan)

=== Other Projects in Other States ===
- St. Mark's Church (closed) (Gary, Indiana)
