= Charles Wallace (cricketer) =

English cricketer

Personal information
- Full name: Charles William Wallace
- Born: 24 November 1884; Calcutta, India
- Died: 5 September 1946 (aged 61); Awbridge, Hampshire, England

Domestic team information
- Years: Team
- 1921–1922: Worcestershire

Career statistics
Competition	FC
Matches	4
Runs scored	66
Batting average	11.00
100s/50s	0/0
Top score	39*
Balls bowled	0
Wickets	0
Bowling average	-
5 wickets in innings	0
10 wickets in match	0
Best bowling	-
Catches/stumpings	1/0
- Source: , 4 August 2008

Charles William Wallace (24 November 1884 – 5 September 1946) was an English first-class cricketer who played four first-class matches for Worcestershire in the early 1920s. His highest score was 39 not out against Hampshire in June 1922.
