= Moto (restaurant) =

Restaurant in Chicago, Illinois, United States

Coordinates: 41°53′11.4″N 87°39′6.5″W

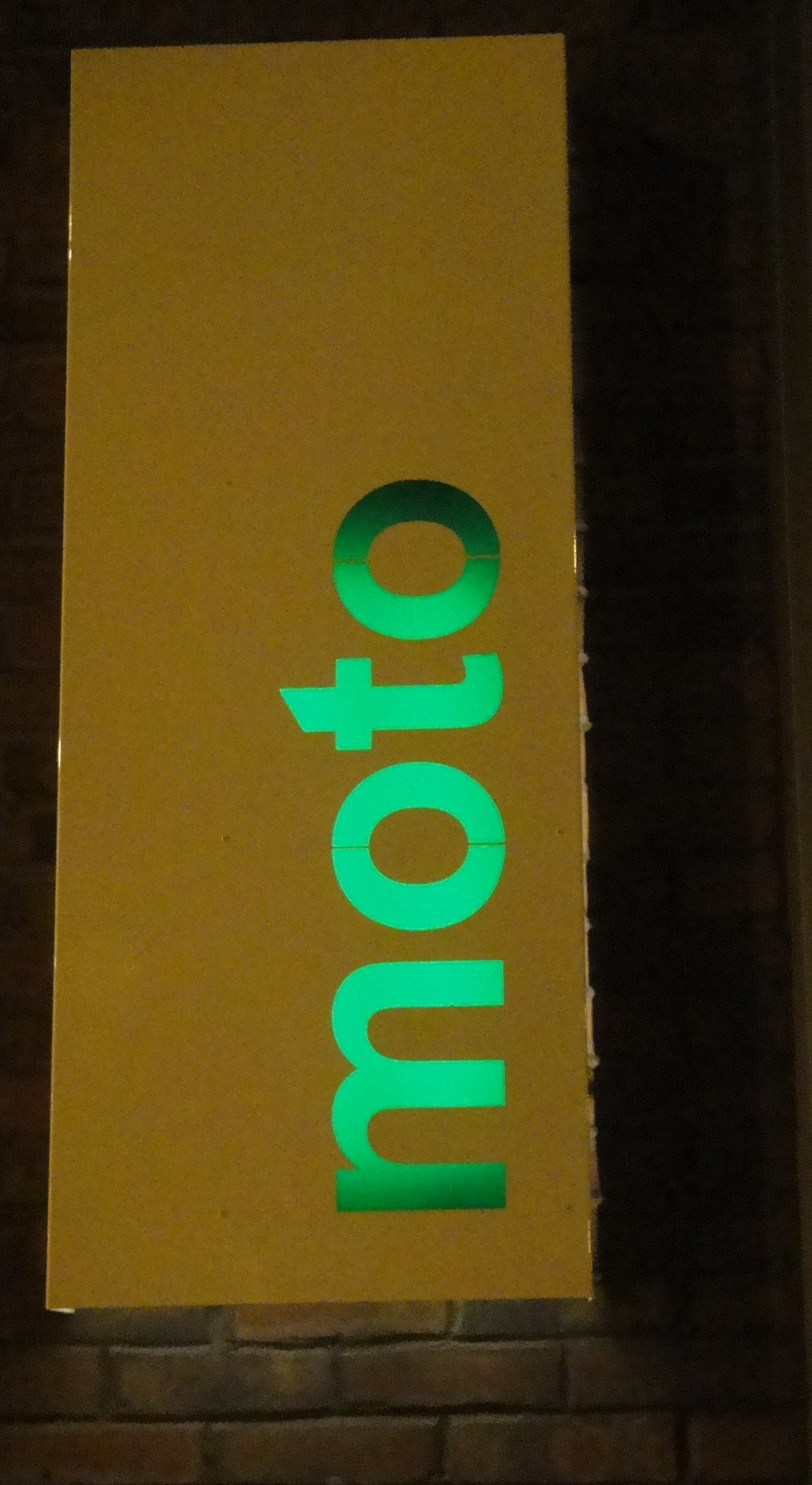
Sign outside Moto

Moto was a molecular gastronomy restaurant in the Fulton River District of Chicago, Illinois known for creating "high-tech" dishes which incorporate elements such as carbonated fruit, edible paper, lasers, and liquid nitrogen for freezing food.

Moto was run by executive chef Homaro Cantu until his suicide in 2015. Sister restaurant iNG was located next door and served "flavor tripping cuisine" based on "the miracle berry", which makes sour foods taste sweet.

== History ==
In 2003, restaurateur Joseph De Vito, who had previously opened a burger joint and a classical Italian eatery, was looking to open a new restaurant. He wanted it to be unusual and was considering Asian fusion. Chef Homaro Cantu, then sous chef at Charlie Trotter's, applied for the job, pitching something really different. "This guy comes in with these little glasses, he looks like an accountant," De Vito recalled, "and started talking about levitating food. I walked away saying, 'Wow, that's a lot to take in.'" Cantu persuaded De Vito to let him cook a meal for De Vito and his wife. The seven-course meal, which featured an exploding ravioli and a small table-top box that cooked fish before the guest's eyes, won De Vito over. The name Moto, meaning "idea," "taste," or "desire" in Japanese, was chosen for the new venture.

Nestled among warehouses in Chicago's meatpacking district, Moto opened in January 2004. Initially, guests were confused. People would come in looking for sushi and leave when offered a degustation menu instead, De Vito recalled. Enough people braved the menu, however, and soon the restaurant was discovered by foodies. Cantu soon earned a reputation for shocking guests. For example, one feature was synthetic wine squirted into the glass with a medical syringe. An industrial-sized tank of liquid nitrogen was kept outside the restaurant to make hot food cold and give fishes odd shapes.

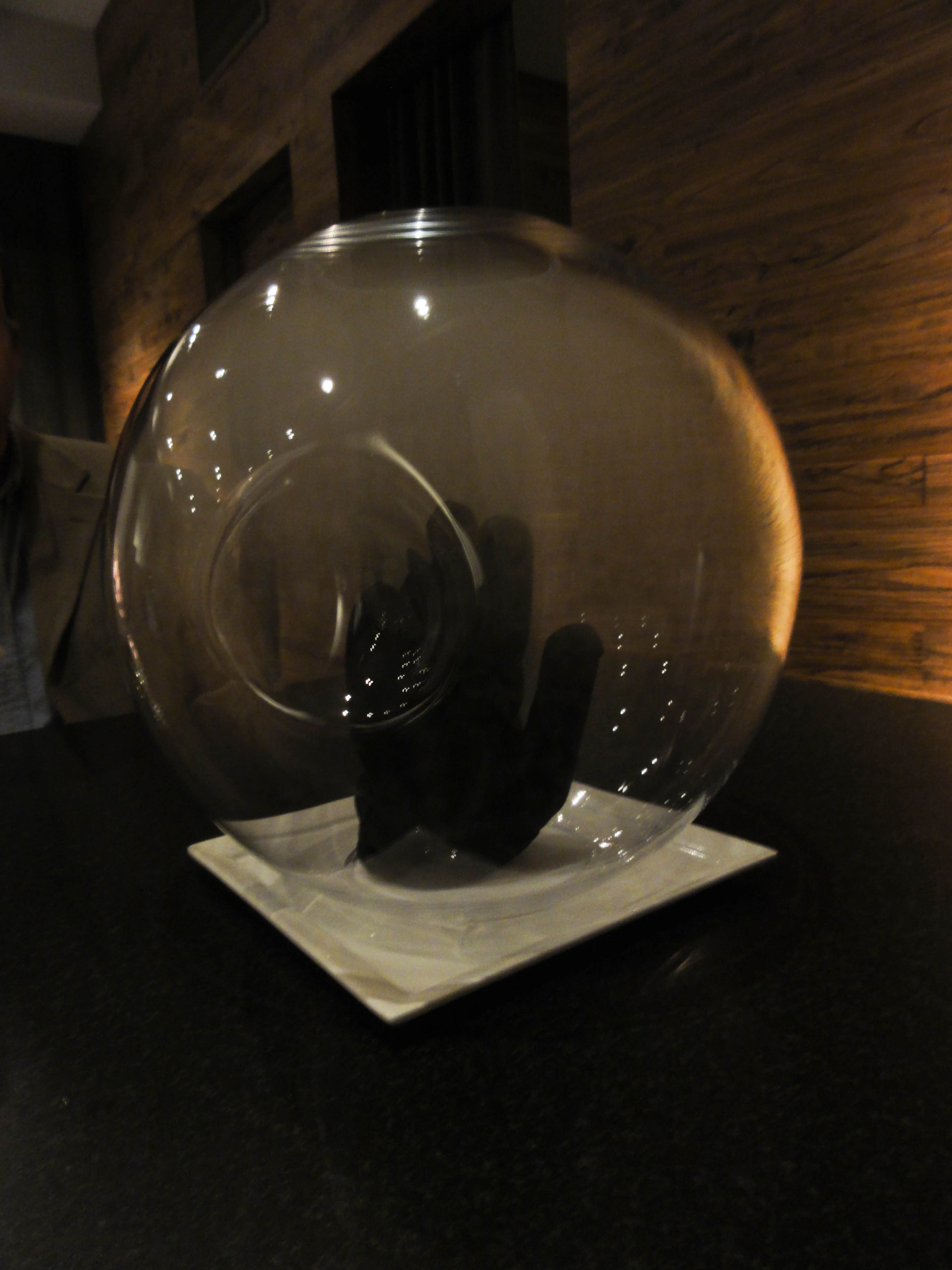
"Smell the Glove" course at Moto. Customers are instructed to inhale the smoke from the leather glove while eating glove shaped chocolate.

In the kitchen, Cantu employed unusual devices such as a centrifuge, a hand-held ion particle gun, and a class IV laser, among other science gadgets. Moto's menu showed off Cantu's zany ideas, describing dishes as "surf and turf with mc escher" and "after christmas sale on christmas trees." At weekly brainstorming sessions, Moto chefs were encouraged to come up with new takes on ordinary food by discussing how they could change foods they ate that week. Prototypes were created, and failure was encouraged. Within two years, Moto's crazy dishes had attracted the attention of The New York Times and Gourmet magazine, and Cantu had been asked to cook for Nobel Prize winners and molecular gastronomy pioneer Ferran Adrià. Burger King sent a group of executives to Moto to explore Cantu's edible paper invention and other ideas.

Initially, food critics were not impressed saying Moto sacrificed deliciousness in favor of cleverness. Other chefs were split, variously describing Cantu as a "faddish flavor of the month" or a "creative genius." Over time, guests and critics began to notice the quality of the food in addition to the odd presentation. A 2005 review by The New York Times Magazine declared "A 20-course tasting menu can begin with 'sushi' made of paper that has been printed with images of maki and wrapped around vinegared rice and conclude with a mint-flavored picture of a candy cane ... It may sound like some sort of Surrealist stunt with dire intestinal consequences, but here’s the rub: The 'food' tastes good. Good enough to lure diners back at $240 per head".

Cantu eventually took over ownership of Moto. In 2010, Moto was the main focus of a TV show called Future Food that aired on Discovery's Planet Green and was co-hosted by Cantu.

On April 14, 2015, Cantu died by suicide. Moto was closed the next several days, reopening on April 18. A special "celebration of (Cantu’s) life" menu was offered for three days in which 10–20 former Moto employees offered contributions. Executive chef Richie Farina commented "The last thing he would want was for us not to be in the kitchen cooking ... We're going to continue to do what he taught us and what he would want."

Following his death in 2015, Director/Producer Brett A. Schwartz of StoryScreen directed and produced a feature-length documentary film called Insatiable: The Homaro Cantu Story (2016). Insatiable had its world premiere at SXSW in March 2016. The film includes many scenes shot inside Moto and iNG.

In January 2016, Cantu's widow Katie McGowan announced the sale of Moto to the Alinea Group, a restaurant in Chicago. McGowan, who inherited Moto after her husband's death, said that the sale was a "bittersweet decision" that came "after deep reflection of the lasting impact" her late husband Cantu had made with his innovative restaurant.

== Menu ==
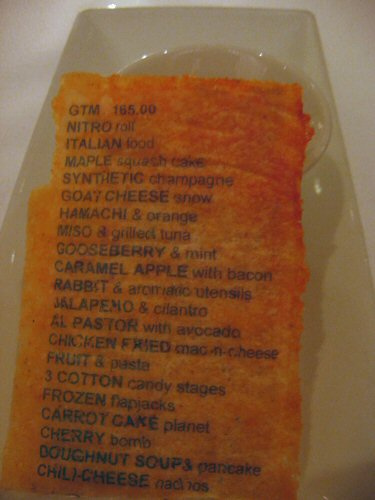
An edible Moto menu

The menu at Moto changed frequently. A typical ten- to twenty-course tasting menu at Moto began with an edible menu. Often, guests would be encouraged to crunch the menu itself up and add it to a bowl of gazpacho to create "alphabet soup." One of the restaurant's hallmarks was the use of edible paper. The soy- and cornstarch-based parchment with vegetable juice as ink was typically used in two to three courses each night. Often an edible photograph accompanied a dish, such as a photo of a cow flavored to taste like filet mignon. Explaining his use of the paper in 2005, Cantu remarked "Gastronomy has to catch up to the evolution in technology" and said he was attempting to change preconceived notions of what food is. Moto customers are "sick and tired of steak and eggs", he said. "They're tired of just going to a restaurant, having food placed on the table, having it cleared, and there's no more mental input into it other than the basic needs of a caveman, just eat and nourish ... there's so much more we can do."

Another early Moto signature dish used a three-inch-square super-insulating polymer box that was heated to 350 °F (177 °C) in an oven. The box was then placed on the guest's table and a small piece of raw fish inserted to cook before their eyes. Other early offerings were synthetic champagne, flapjacks frozen on a −273 °F (−169 °C) grill, and carbonated fruit. One of the main courses, "Surf & Turf", combined Hawaiian sea bass, duck sous vide, foie gras foam, mushrooms, and apple butter. The dish came with a picture of M.C. Escher, which guests were instructed to eat. It was flavored like a bird on the top and the sea on the bottom. A twenty-course tasting menu was priced at $240.

In 2005, Cantu began experimenting with liquid nitrogen to flash-freeze food, and helium and superconductors in an attempt to levitate them. He purchased a class IV laser (the highest grade available) to cook the interior of fish while leaving the outside raw, and create "inside out bread" with a doughy exterior and crusty interior. Later dishes include the "Donut Soup" (an espresso designed to taste like Krispy Kreme doughnut filling) and a sweetbreads and cheese grits dish served with goat-cheese "snow". The 2008 Frommer's guide said Moto's menu was designed to take "dining beyond just eating" with interactive dishes through innovation such as the use of specially designed corkscrew-handled spoons stuffed with herbs to provide aroma as you eat. It also mentioned Cantu's sense of humor in adding smoky aromas to a raw food course.

The Spring/Summer 2012 menu at Moto featured 15 courses, including "Reconstructed Corn," "Forest Foraging 2.0," "The Explosion," and "Smell the Glove." The meal begins with a menu without words, in which the 15 courses are downsized into bite-size portions, with the dessert courses made into savory versions so as not to spoil the palate. As of 2015, the menu starts with a "preview" course with miniature versions of all the courses to come. There are no options to pick from, although the staff discusses allergies and food dislikes at the time a reservation is made.

== Reputation ==
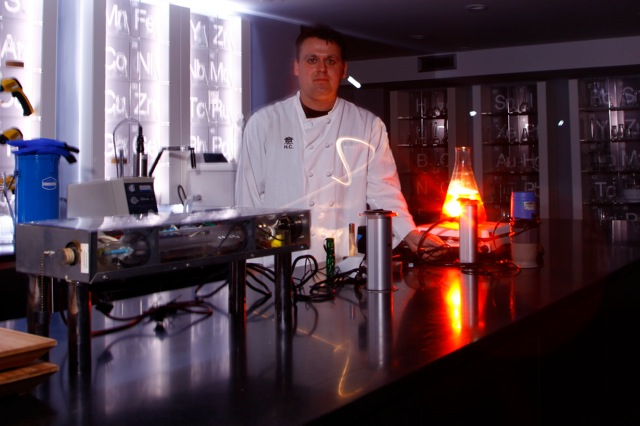
Chef Homaro Cantu poses among various Moto cooking gadgets.

A 2005 review by The New York Times, described the Moto customers as "a trend-conscious crowd." Frommer's gave Moto 3 stars, saying it offered Chicago's "most jaw-droppingly original dishes". In 2012, Moto earned a Michelin star, which it retains as of 2015. In its most recent review, Michelin remarked "The look of the dishes is quite something else ... there's no doubt the kitchen has all the techniques down pat, from pickling to dehydrating. However, the best dishes are often the simplest as sometimes there are too many flavors battling for supremacy."

Forbes' ranked Moto #44 on its 2012 list of "The 100 Best US Restaurants." Author Patricia Schultz listed Moto as one of the 1,000 Places to See Before You Die in her best-selling travel book.
