= St. Viator Church =

Coordinates: 41°55′47.798″N 87°43′54.383″W

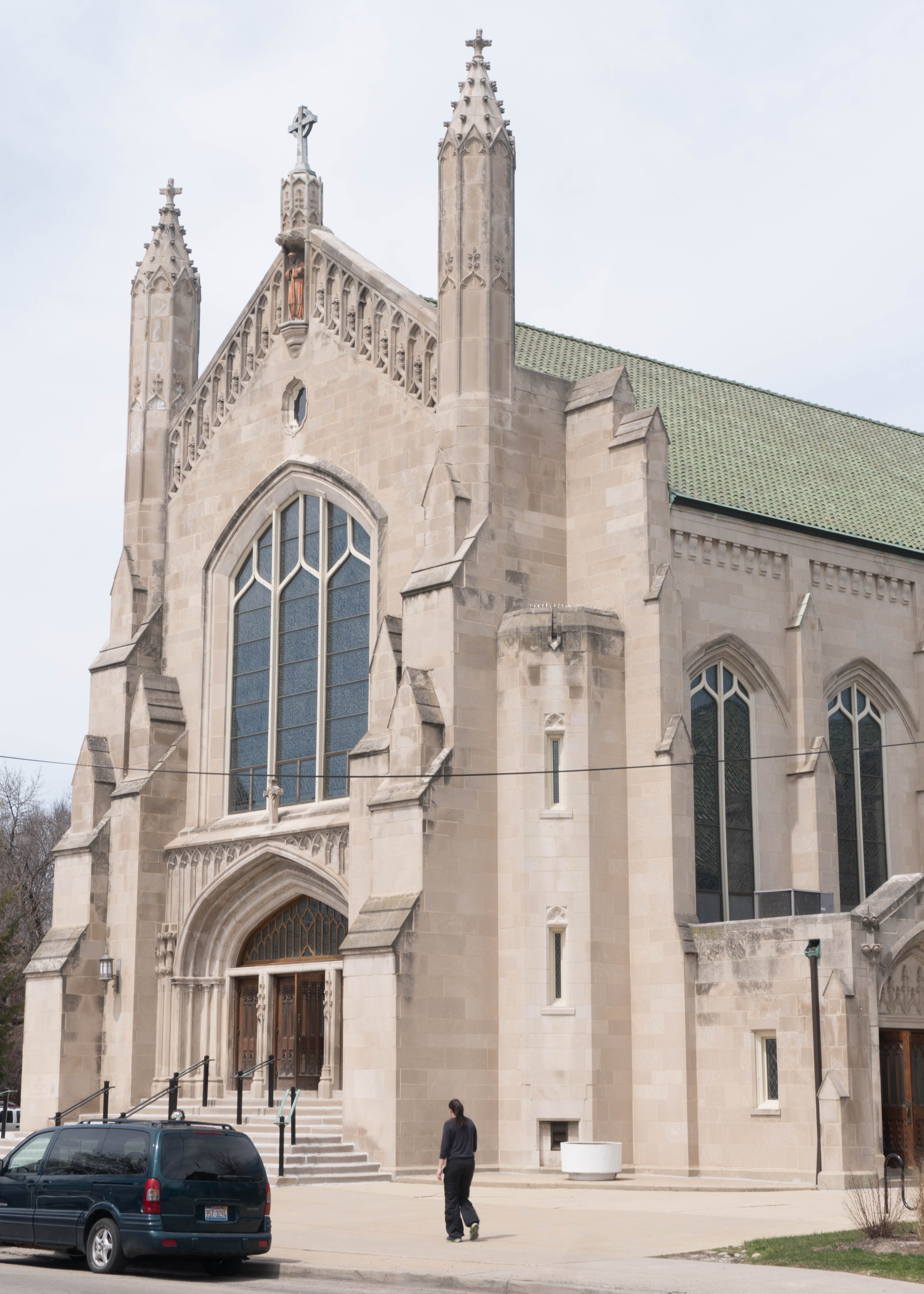

- Location: 4170 West Addison Street; Chicago, Illinois
- Country: United States
- Denomination: Roman Catholic
- Website: St. Viator's Parish

History
- Status: Parish church
- Founded: 1888
- Founder: Clerics of St. Viator
- Dedication: St. Viator
- Dedicated: May 5, 1929

Architecture
- Functional status: Active
- Architect: Charles L. Wallace
- Architectural type: Church
- Style: English Gothic
- Groundbreaking: 1927
- Completed: 1929

Specifications
- Materials: Brick

Administration
- Province: Chicago
- Archdiocese: Chicago

Clergy
- Pastor(s): Fr. Patrick Render, CSV

St. Viator Church is an historic parish church of the Roman Catholic Archdiocese of Chicago located in the Old Irving Park neighborhood in Chicago, Illinois. The church is located at 4170 West Addison Street.

== History ==
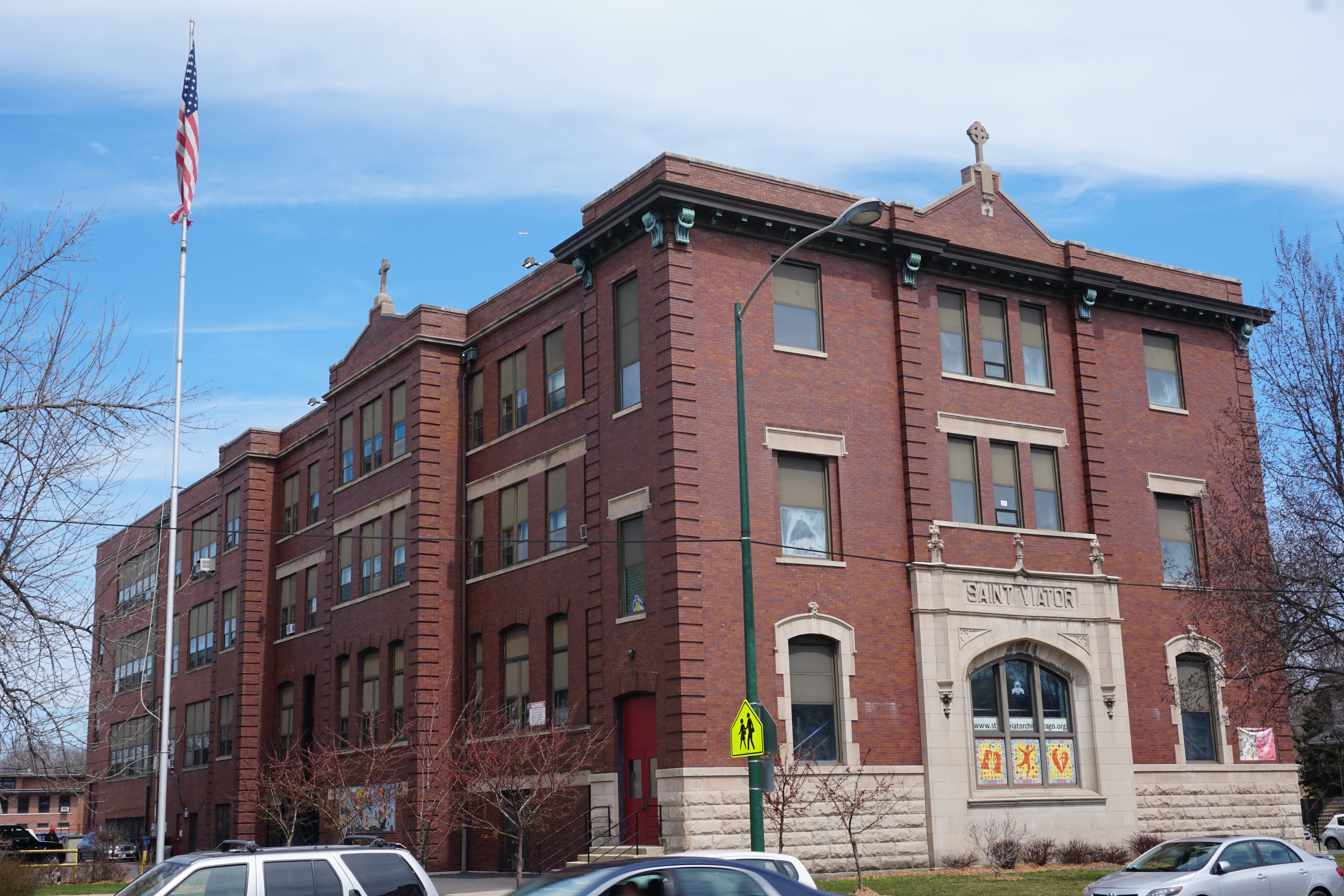
St Viator School

Founded in 1888 by the Clerics of Saint Viator who administered St. Viator College. The original parish was located on Belmont Avenue and Pulaski Road in Jefferson Township before the town was annexed by the city Chicago.

The Sisters of St. Joseph were invited to direct the parish's school in 1902. By 1904 the parish grew and it relocated to its current location on Addison Street and Kedvale Avenue. Groundbreaking for the current church building was in 1927 and the cornerstone was laid on 13 November 1927 by Bishop Edward Francis Hoban, an auxiliary bishop of the Archdiocese of Chicago from 1921 to 1928. In 1929, the church was dedicated by Cardinal George Mundelein. Today, the parish grounds consists of the church, rectory, convent, recreation center, and St. Viator Elementary School which provides education for students pre-kindergarten through eighth grade.

== Architecture ==
The church was designed by architect Charles L. Wallace in the English Gothic style.

== Church in architecture books ==
- McNamara, Denis R. (2005). Heavenly City: The Architectural Tradition of Catholic Chicago. Liturgy Training Publications. ISBN 1568545037.
- Lane, George A. (1982). Chicago Churches and Synagogues: An Architectural Pilgrimage. Loyola Press.

== See also ==
- Clerics of Saint Viator
