= Monica Kim (historian) =

- Born: 1977 or 1978
- Honours: MacArthur Fellow (2022)

Academic background
- Education: Yale University (B.A.); University of Michigan (PhD)

Academic work
- Institutions: University of Wisconsin–Madison

Monica Kim (born 1977 or 1978) is an American historian of U.S. foreign policy after World War II. She focuses on Cold War "wars of intervention" and the Korean War in particular. She is a faculty member of the University of Wisconsin–Madison.

Kim was a 2022 MacArthur Fellow.

== Education and career ==
Kim was born to parents who immigrated to the U.S. from Korea due to the Korean War.

Kim attended Yale for her bachelor's degree, graduating in 2000, and attended the University of Michigan for her PhD, graduating in 2011. She studied the Korean War for her graduate degrees.

From 2012 to 2014, Kim worked as an assistant professor at University at Albany-SUNY. She then worked as an assistant professor in the Department of History at New York University from 2014 to 2020.

In 2020, Kim joined the University of Wisconsin–Madison as an associate professor and the William Appleman Williams & David G. and Marion S. Meissner Chair in U.S. International and Diplomatic History.

== Works ==
=== Books ===
- The Interrogation Rooms of the Korean War: The Untold Histories. Princeton University Press. 2019. ISBN 9780691166223.
- The World That Hunger Made: The Koreas, the United States, and Afro-Asia (in-process)
