= Wesley Charles Jacobs Jr. =

American rural planner

Wesley Charles Jacobs Jr. (also known as Wesley Chuck Jacobs) is an American rural planner, who, as an Oglala Lakota, works in South Dakota for the First Nation's Financial Project.

He graduated from University of Massachusetts Amherst with a Master's in Rural Planning, in 1984.

In 1987, Jacobs received the MacArthur Fellows Program award with grant for his work as

"a rural planner involved in efforts to improve the living conditions and economy of tribal areas with high unemployment and poverty. ... His research on the extent and impact of reservation trade on surrounding border towns and his investigation of the mutually dependent relationship of that trade, have opened up new areas of analysis. His work inaugurated a significant shift away from federal government grants to private funding aimed at making the Sioux more self-sufficient. His findings have brought hope and new economic development to one of the poorest areas of the nation." —MacArthur Foundation

From 2008 to 2010, Jacobs represented the Oglala Sioux Tribe on the board of directors of the Intertribal Bison Cooperative.
