= John Henneberger =

- Education: B.A. (1976) University of Texas at Austin
- Occupation: Housing Advocate
- Employer: Texas Low Income Housing Information Service
- Awards: MacArthur Fellowship

John Henneberger is an advocate for affordable housing active in Austin, Texas. He is best known for his work reforming Texan housing laws and for aiding in the development of improved emergency housing. He was the recipient of a MacArthur Award in 2014.

== Bibliography ==
- Housing Patterns Study: Segregation and Discrimination in Austin, Texas (1979)
