= Sandra Lanham =

Sandra Lanham (born 1948) is the founder and sole pilot of Environmental Flying Services, a non-profit organization located in Tucson, Arizona.

E-Flying was created to help researchers and scientists such as Conservation International. She offers her flying services at no charge, charging only for fuel costs and expenses. Grants support her operations.

== Awards ==
- 2001 MacArthur Fellows Program
