= Rustin McIntosh =

American pediatrician (1894–1986)

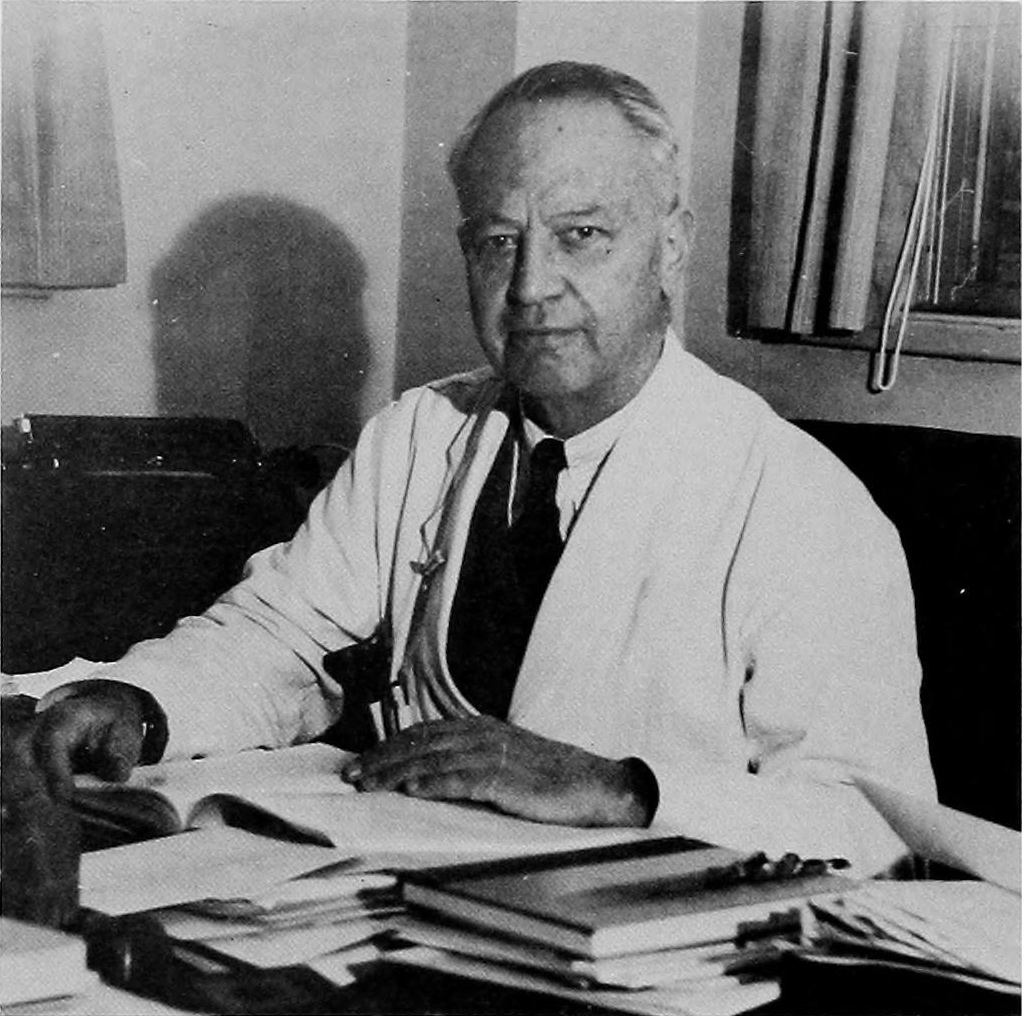
Rustin McIntosh, c. 1960

Rustin McIntosh (September 29, 1894 – February 15, 1986) was an American pediatrician. From 1930 until 1960, he was the chief of pediatrics at the Babies Hospital of NewYork–Presbyterian Hospital and the Reuben S. Carpentier Professor of Pediatrics at Columbia University. He received the John Howland Award in 1961.

== Early life ==
McIntosh was born on September 29, 1894, in Omaha, Nebraska. He attended Phillips Exeter Academy, graduating in 1910, and Harvard University, receiving a bachelor's degree in 1914 and a medical degree in 1918. After graduating from medical school, he served as a lieutenant in the Medical Corps of the United States Marines for three months until the end of World War I. He was stationed in France and received the Croix de guerre.

== Career ==
After being discharged from the military, McIntosh worked as a pathology assistant at the Boston City Hospital. Moving to New York City, he became a medical intern at NewYork–Presbyterian Hospital and a pediatric intern and resident at the Babies Hospital (now Morgan Stanley Children's Hospital). He worked in private practice in New York from 1923 and 1927, before relocating to Baltimore to take up a position at the Johns Hopkins Hospital under the pediatrician Edwards A. Park. In 1930, he returned to work at NewYork–Presbyterian, where he was appointed chief of pediatrics at the Babies Hospital and made a professor at Columbia University. He married Millicent Carey McIntosh in 1932; the couple had five children.

McIntosh was a pediatric generalist, but as the director of pediatrics at the Columbia University College of Physicians and Surgeons, he assembled a department of noted pediatric subspecialists; these included Dorothy Andersen (pathology), Hattie Alexander (infectious disease), William Silverman (neonatology), and John Caffey (radiology). McIntosh published numerous research articles on congenital malformations, chaired a council on rheumatic fever, and was involved in several international congresses on poliomyelitis. He and L. Emmett Holt, Jr. (son of Luther Emmett Holt) were the editors of select editions of the textbooks Holt's Diseases of Infancy and Childhood (10th and 11th editions, 1933 and 1940) and Pediatrics (12th and 13th editions, 1953 and 1962). In 1953–1954, he served as president of the American Pediatric Society and in 1961, he was awarded the John Howland Award, the highest honor given by the society.

McIntosh retired from medical practice 1960 and became a professor emeritus at Columbia.

== Death ==
McIntosh died on February 15, 1986, aged 91, in Tyringham, Massachusetts. A collection of his papers is held at Columbia University's Health Sciences Library.
