= John Howland (doctor) =

American pediatrician and medical educator (1873–1926)

- John Howland by William Franklin Draper, 1957
- Born: February 3, 1873; New York City, U.S.
- Died: June 20, 1926 (aged 53)
- Education: Yale University (BA); New York University School of Medicine (MD); Cornell University Medical College (MD)
- Employer(s): Washington University in St. Louis; Johns Hopkins University

Signature
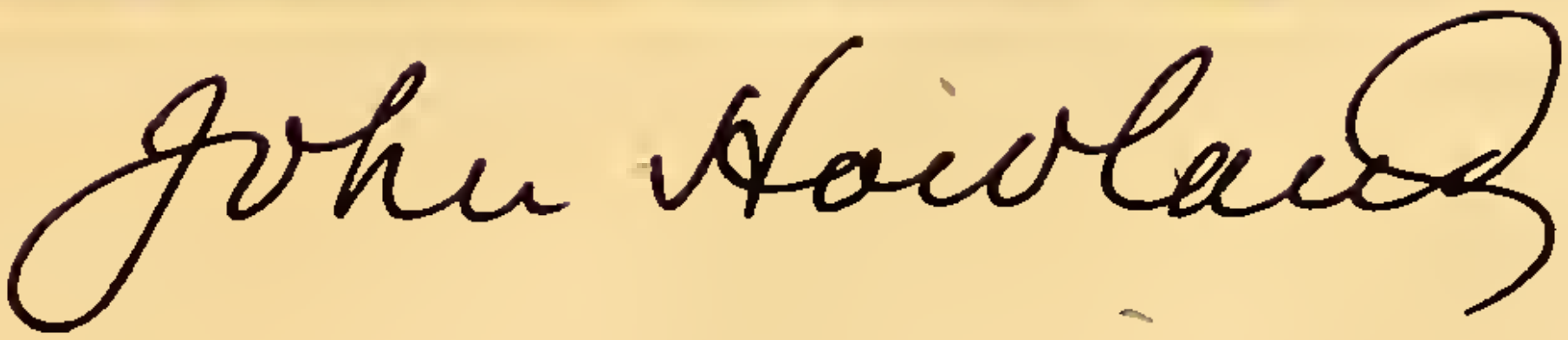

John Howland (February 3, 1873 – June 20, 1926) was an American pediatrician who spent the majority of his career at Johns Hopkins Hospital, where he established the first full-time pediatric department in the United States. The John Howland Award, the highest honor given by the American Pediatric Society, is named after him.

== Early life and education ==
Howland was born in 1873 in New York City to a New England family whose ancestry included John Howland (1592–1673), who traveled on the Mayflower and helped to found the Plymouth Colony.

After graduating from Phillips Exeter Academy, Howland attended Yale University, where he rowed, played tennis, and was a member of the Skull and Bones secret society. He received his Bachelor of Arts from Yale in 1894 and went on to study medicine at the New York University School of Medicine, graduating in 1897. He then earned a second M.D. from Cornell University Medical College in 1899.

== Career ==
Howland interned at the Presbyterian Hospital in New York City in 1899–1900. He also worked at the New York Foundling Hospital, where he was influenced by the noted pediatrician Luther Emmett Holt. He then spent two years studying in Europe, spending time in Vienna and Berlin, and upon his return to New York he joined Holt in private pediatric practice. He practiced with Holt from 1901 to 1910, during this time also teaching at the Presbyterian, Foundling, and Babies Hospital. In 1910, he left New York for Missouri, where he was appointed chair of pediatrics at Washington University School of Medicine. His tenure there was brief, and in 1911 he moved to Baltimore to head the Harriet Lane Home for Invalid Children at the Johns Hopkins Hospital; he would remain the chair of pediatrics at Johns Hopkins until his death in 1926.

At Johns Hopkins, Howland is credited with establishing the first full-time department of pediatrics in the United States, and the first fully academic department of pediatrics in the world. In his department, all faculty members worked full-time and had to dedicate at least half of their time to research. Howland published research on rickets, tetany and diarrhea. He and William McKim Marriott demonstrated that acidosis in diarrheal illnesses was caused by the excretion of bicarbonate in the stools rather than by a toxin, and with Edwards A. Park he showed that tetany was caused by alkalosis and hypocalcemia.

== Death and legacy ==
Howland died in 1926 from cirrhosis. Many of the physicians he mentored at Johns Hopkins went on to become leaders in the field of pediatrics: these include Kenneth Blackfan, Edwards A. Park, Ethel Collins Dunham, L. Emmett Holt Jr., Grover Powers, Wilburt C. Davison, James L. Gamble, and William McKim Marriott. In 1951, the American Pediatric Society created the John Howland Award, which is the highest honor given by the society "for distinguished service to pediatrics".
