= Joseph Dancis =

American pediatrician

Joseph Dancis (March 19, 1916 – March 30, 2010) was an American pediatrician at Bellevue Hospital in New York City known for his research contributions to neonatology and placentology. He received the John Howland Award, the highest award bestowed by the American Pediatric Society (APS), in 1988.

== Early life ==
Dancis was born on March 19, 1916, in Brooklyn and was raised in the Bronx. He attended Columbia College from 1931 to 1934 and received an M.D. from Saint Louis University School of Medicine in 1938. After graduating, he returned to New York City to complete a rotating internship and a residency in pediatrics at Queens General Hospital. He served in the U.S. Army from 1941 to 1945 and was stationed in Hawaii. He achieved the rank of captain. He subsequently completed his training in pediatrics at Bellevue Hospital.

== Career and research ==
Dancis was appointed as an academic in the Bellevue Hospital pediatrics department led by L. Emmett Holt Jr. In the early 1950s, in order to advance his understanding of biochemistry, metabolism and radioisotopes, Dancis spent a year each at the New York University Department of Biochemistry and the Sloan Kettering Institute. He noticed that none of the staff members at Bellevue were particularly interested in neonatology, or study of the newborn, and so decided to "fill the vacuum" himself. He made significant contributions to the research of inborn errors of metabolism; this included identifying with colleagues the enzyme defect that causes maple syrup urine disease. He also published important research on familial dysautonomia, Lesch–Nyhan syndrome, and retinopathy of prematurity. He was particularly interested in the placenta, studying its role in synthesis as well as transport of substances from mother to fetus.

Dancis was appointed chairman of the pediatrics department at the New York University School of Medicine in 1974. He was elected president of the American Pediatric Society in 1983 and received the APS's most prestigious award, the John Howland Award, in 1988. During his career, he authored a total of 258 publications.

== Death ==
Dancis died in New York City on March 30, 2010. On the day that he died, he had attended the pediatrics grand rounds at NYU before collapsing while walking home to his apartment.
