= Luther Emmett Holt =

American pediatrician and author

L. Emmett Holt
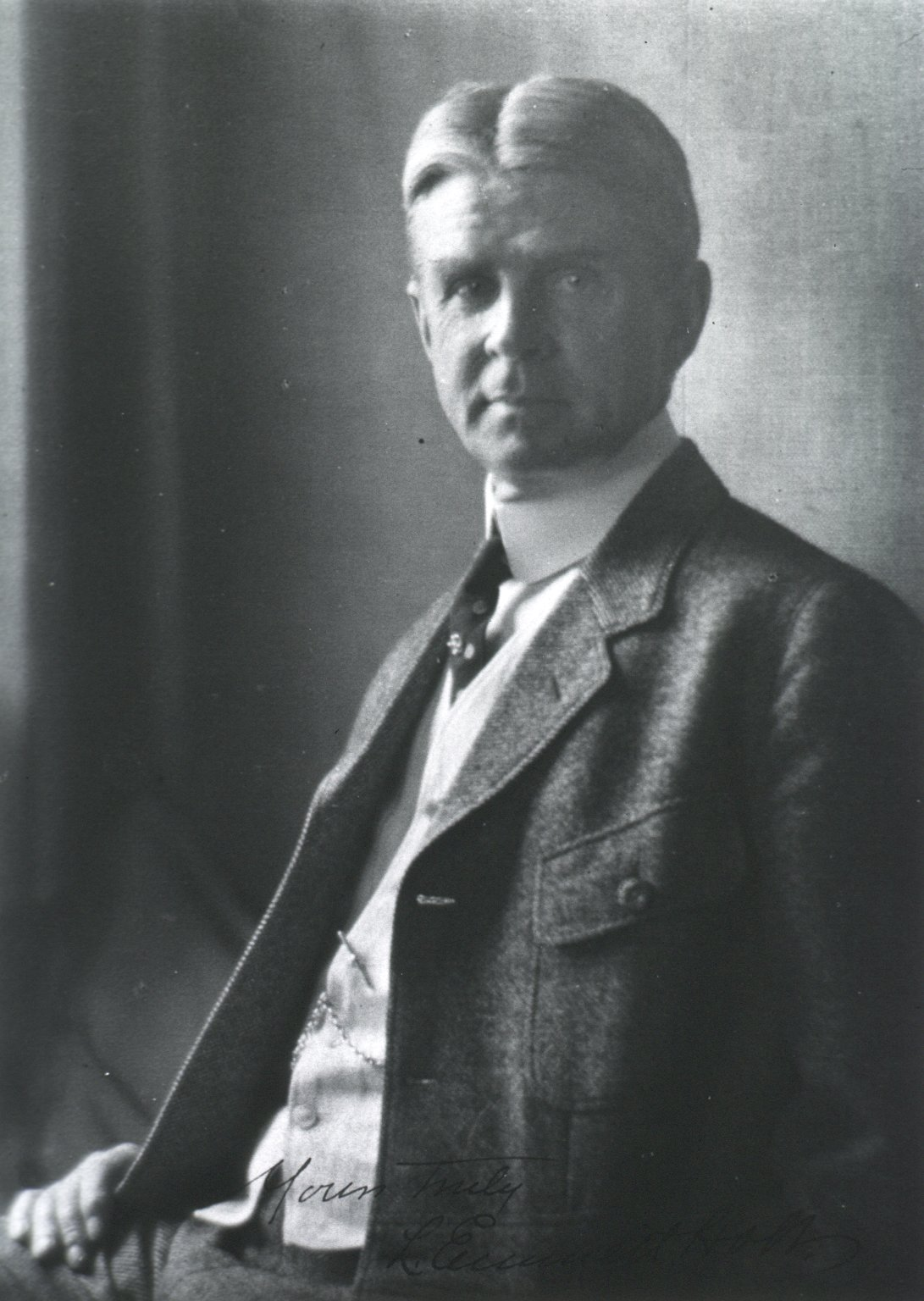
- Born: March 4, 1855; Webster, New York
- Died: January 14, 1924 (aged 68); Peking, China
- Education: University of Rochester, Columbia University, Brown University
- Awards: John Howland Award (1966)
- Scientific career
- Fields: Pediatrician
- Workplaces: American Pediatric Society, Rockefeller Institute

Luther Emmett Holt (March 4, 1855 – January 14, 1924) was an American pediatrician and author, noted for writing The Care and Feeding of Children: A Catechism for the Use of Mothers and Children's Nurses in 1894.

Born near Rochester, New York, Holt graduated from the University of Rochester in 1875. He went to medical school in the University at Buffalo and then the Columbia University College of Physicians and Surgeons, earning his M.D. in 1880. He pioneered the science of pediatrics, and became the head physician at New York's Babies Hospital in 1888. Under his leadership it became the leading pediatric hospital of its time.

One of Holt's most notable accomplishments is the introduction of milk certification in New York City. Using a grant he acquired through his connection with the Rockefeller Institute Holt surveyed the quality of milk in the tenement districts and subsequently proved that a large proportion of infant fatalities were due to excessively high bacterial counts. He was instrumental in the creation of milk commissions and advisory boards for the city's Department of Health.

In 1887, a hospital designated solely for children became a reality when five determined women purchased a brownstone house at the corner of Lexington Avenue and 55th Street, near the site of Bloomingdale's today. Holt became its first medical director of the Babies Hospital in 1889 - now Morgan Stanley Children's Hospital. At his first rounds examining the patients, he noted with interest, the practice of the nurses there in maintaining a clipboard at the bedside (cribside) upon which important clinical information was being kept. He began adding physician observations to it, and thus was born the "medical record" or "chart". The head of nursing at that time had a set of lecture notes, which she used in the education of parents. He adapted it into a book that became the standard child rearing text The Care and Feeding of Children: A Catechism for the Use of Mothers and Children's Nurses (1894). This remained the pre-eminent guide until Psychological Care of Infant and Child (Watson 1928) and then Baby and Child Care (Spock 1946). Holt promoted the idea of regimented and disciplined parenting. His book included a schedule of activities (such as toilet training) to be learned at specific ages, and meals to at regular hours to "prevent disease". He advised that: "Babies under six months should never be played with: and the less of it at anytime the better for the infant. They are made nervous and irritable, sleep badly and suffer from indigestion."

In 1900, the Rockefeller family funded the construction of a new Babies' Hospital at the same site, a 10-story state-of-the-art building that still stands to this day. However, by the 1920s even this building was too small, so Babies' Hospital joined Presbyterian Hospital, the Neurological Institute and the College of Physicians & Surgeons of Columbia University, to build Columbia-Presbyterian Medical Center, located between West 165th and 168th Streets and Broadway. It continues today as the largest Hospital in the NewYork-Presbyterian Hospital system.

Many important early figures in pediatrics did their internship under his supervision, such as Dorothy Reed (Mendenhall), MD, John Howland, MD (1st Chairman of pediatrics at Johns Hopkins and Director of the Harriet Lane Home for Invalid Children) and Edward Parks, MD (3d chair at Johns Hopkins). At the turn of the century, Dr. Holt was a major figure in pediatrics. He was a charter member of the American Pediatric Society and would be elected its president twice, an honor bestowed upon only one other doctor. In 1901 he was appointed to the board of the Rockefeller Institute, under whose auspices he would eventually travel to China. Following his development of a child welfare program adopted at the Red Cross Cannes Conference (1919), he was elected president of the Child Health Organization.

As president of the American Association for the Study and Prevention of Infant Mortality (AASPIM), Holt promoted reproduction control by society as a means of eugenics. In his 1913 presidential address he said:

We must eliminate the unfit by birth not by death. The race is to be most effectively improved by preventing marriage and reproduction by the unfit, among whom we would class the diseased, the degenerate, the defective, and the criminal.

He wrote The Care and Feeding of Children to great acclaim, and the text quickly became a bestseller. He also wrote Diseases of Infancy and Childhood in 1896; the book would go through 11 editions and remain the definitive text on pediatrics until 1940. Editions published after Holt's death were revised and edited by his son, Luther Emmett Holt, Jr., and Rustin McIntosh. In 1967, Holt, Jr., renewed the copyright. In 1980, Appleton/Classics of Medicine Library published a facsimile of the 1897 first edition.

Holt was a professor at Columbia University College of Physicians and Surgeons from 1901 to 1922. In 1923, despite his old age, the Rockefeller Institute called on him to lecture at Peking Union Medical College for their winter term. Holt accepted, viewing the offer as both an opportunity to observe Chinese children for his own studies, and introduce pediatrics to the Chinese doctors. Days before his return home, Holt suffered a heart attack and died in Peking on January 14, 1924.
