= Grover Powers =

American pediatrician (1887–1968)

- Born: August 12, 1887; Colfax, Indiana, United States
- Died: April 18, 1968 (aged 80); New Haven, Connecticut, United States
- Education: Purdue University (B.S.); Johns Hopkins University (M.D.)
- Awards: Lasker Award; John Howland Award

Grover Francis Powers (August 12, 1887 – April 18, 1968) was an American pediatrician. He served as director of the Yale University department of pediatrics from 1927 to 1952. He won the second John Howland Award in 1953.

== Early life and edudcation ==
Grover Powers was born in 1887 in Colfax, Indiana, and grew up in Lafayette, Indiana. He graduated from Purdue University with a B.S. in 1908 and from Johns Hopkins University with an M.D. in 1913.

== Career ==
The first seven years of his career were spent at the Johns Hopkins Hospital department of pediatrics, where he worked with John Howland, Edwards A. Park, Kenneth Blackfan, and William McKim Marriott. He moved to the Yale University department of pediatrics with Edwards A. Park in 1921, and succeeded Park as chairman of the department in 1927, a position he remained in until his retirement in 1952.

Powers' contributions to pediatrics included proposing guidelines for the care of premature babies and for the management of infantile diarrhea. He wrote an important paper in 1925 that outlined the principles of infant feeding, arguing that diets should be analyzed by a total caloric intake, including a combination of protein, fat and carbohydrates; these principles were adopted by nutritionists constructing adult diets in World War II. Another popular paper simplified the different options of cow's milk-based infant formulas, which received thousands of international reprint requests. He proposed giving liver extract as a nutritional supplement to children with celiac disease, and in 1949 he won the Borden Award in Nutrition for his research in pediatric nutritional deficiencies.

Powers presented his ideas on creating residential institutions for intellectually disabled children to Wilbur Lucius Cross, the Governor of Connecticut, which eventually contributed to the creation of the Southbury Training School in Southbury, Connecticut.

== Recognition anddeath. ==
Powers served as president of the American Pediatric Society and received the society's highest honor, the John Howland Award, in 1953. He also received a Lasker Award from U.S. President Lyndon B. Johnson. He died in 1968 in New Haven, Connecticut.
