= Philip A. Pizzo =

American professor, physician, and scientist

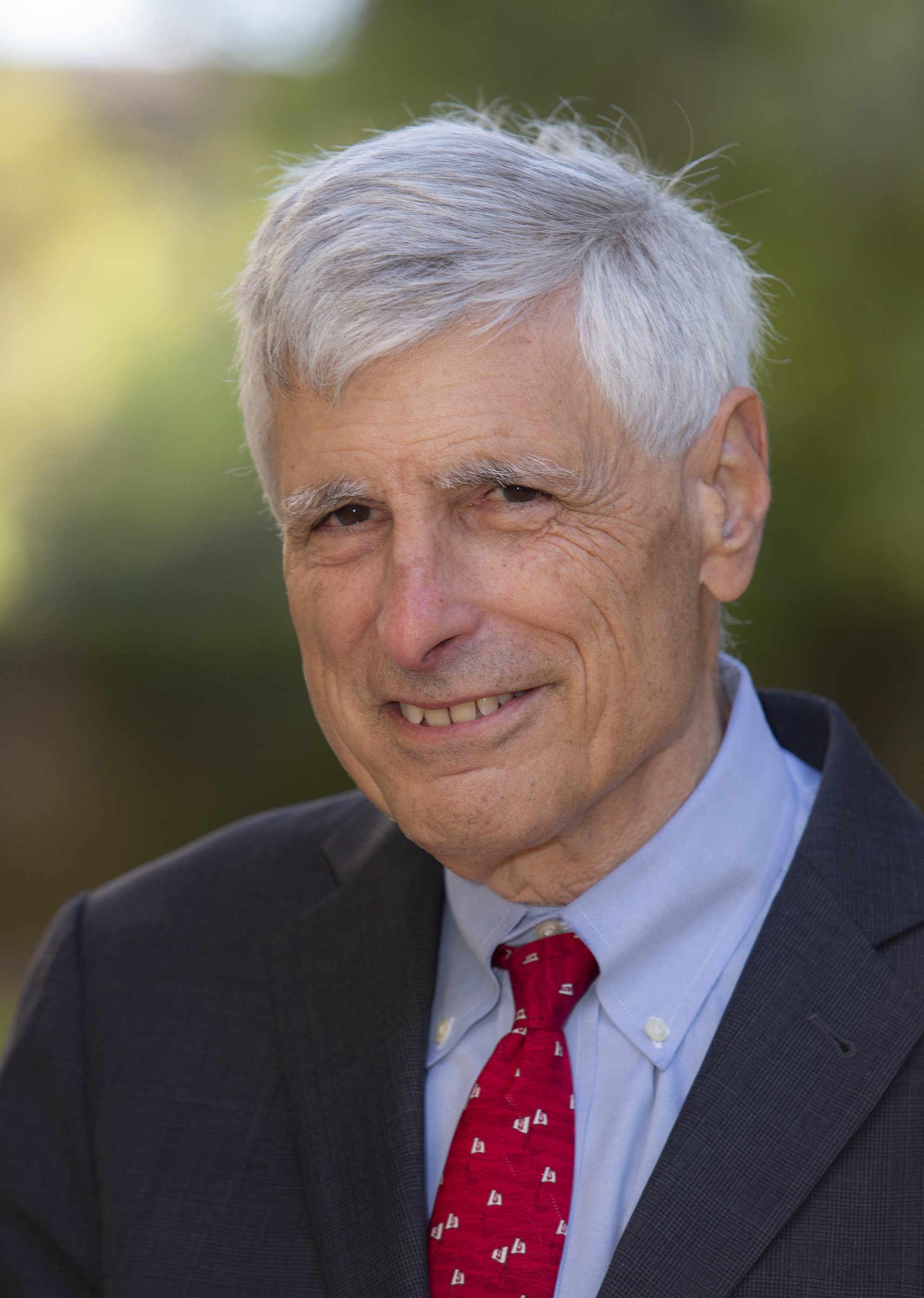
- Pizzo in 2022
- Born: December 1944 (age 81); Bronx, New York
- Education: Fordham University; University of Rochester School of Medicine; The Jewish Theological Seminary
- Known for: 11th Dean of Stanford School of Medicine (2001-12)
- Spouse: Peggy Daly Pizzo (m. 1967)
- Children: 2
- Awards: Public Health Service Outstanding Service Medal, 1995; Ronald McDonald Charities Award of Excellence, 2009; John Howland Award, 2012; John Sterns Medal for Distinguished Contributions in Medicine, 2019; International Immunocompromised Host Society’s Lifetime Distinguished Career Award 2021
- Scientific career
- Fields: Pediatric oncology, pediatric AIDS, infectious diseases, higher education, longevity and spiritual care & chaplaincy
- Workplaces: National Institute of Health, Harvard University, Stanford University

Philip A. Pizzo (born December 1944) is an American professor, physician, and scientist. He is the David and Susan Heckerman Professor of Microbiology and Immunology, Emeritus at Stanford University, and founding director of Stanford's Distinguished Careers Institute. He served as the 11th Dean of the Stanford University School of Medicine from 2001 to 2012. He spent over two decades at the National Institutes of Health, and has devoted much of his medical career to the diagnosis, management, prevention and treatment of children with cancer and AIDS. He has also focused on the future of higher education, specifically for individuals in mid- to late-life. In 2022, he enrolled as a rabbinical student at the Academy for Jewish Religion, California. In 2024 he enrolled in the Program in Spiritual Care and Counseling at the Jewish Theological Seminary.

== Early life ==
Pizzo was born and raised in The Bronx, New York, into a first-generation Sicilian immigrant family. He was the first in his family to attend college. He received his bachelor of science degree in biology from Fordham University in 1966, and his medical degree from the University of Rochester School of Medicine in 1970. Pizzo received an MA in Spiritual Care and Chaplaincy in 2026.

== Career ==
Following medical school Pizzo completed an internship and residency in pediatrics at Children's Hospital Boston. His clinical research examined a wide range of issues involving infection and fevers in children with cancer, helping to identify the best ways to treat the infections. He went on to a teaching fellowship at Harvard Medical School, and a clinical and research fellowship in pediatric oncology at the National Cancer Institute (NCI), a part of the National Institutes of Health (NIH), where he focused on infectious diseases and cancer. In 1976, after his fellowship ended, he was appointed to work at NIH as an investigator in pediatric oncology in the US Public Health Service. In 1980 he was named head of the infectious disease section of the pediatric branch of NCI, and he was named NCI's chief of pediatrics in 1982. At the time of his appointment, NCI focused on cancer, but Pizzo realized the focus should also be on HIV, as the AIDS epidemic had begun to unfold, and he influenced the NIH leaders to take on the care of pediatric HIV cases, developing new approaches to treating and preventing AIDS in children.

In 1996, Pizzo relocated to Boston to serve as physician-in-chief and chair of the Department of Medicine at Children's Hospital Boston and the chair of the Department of Pediatrics at Harvard Medical School, where he was the Thomas Morgan Rotch Professor of Pediatrics from 1996 to 2001. His focus during those years was mainly on education, ultimately playing a lead role in the authorization of the Children's Hospital Graduate Medical Education (GME) Program.

He joined Stanford University in April 2001 and served as Dean of the School of Medicine through December 2012. During this period, he was also the Carl and Elizabeth Naumann Professor of Pediatrics and of Microbiology and Immunology. Pizzo reshaped the Medical School curriculum to focus on the education and training of physician-scientists. During his tenure as dean, Pizzo oversaw a major expansion of facilities, and a major increase in hiring of faculty, sponsored research, and philanthropic support. He was instrumental in building the Li Ka Shing Center for Learning and Knowledge at Stanford, which opened in 2010, and Stanford's medical school became the first in the US to stop accepting industry financing for specific topics in postgraduate educational programs.

In 2013 Pizzo created the Stanford Distinguished Careers Institute (DCI), serving as its founding director, and was also named the David and Susan Heckerman Professor of Pediatrics and of Microbiology and Immunology through 2022. The Stanford DCI provides an opportunity for individuals in mid- and later life to return to higher education.

Pizzo is credited with leading the initiative in the late 1990s to secure federal funding for resident training in children's hospitals, which is roughly $300 million per year. He played a key role in developing the Best Pharmaceuticals for Children Act, enacted in 2002 and promoting clinical trials in children. His advocacy at the Food and Drug Administration helped quicken the development of drugs for children with AIDS. His leadership efforts were specifically highlighted and acknowledged in the Congressional Record. He and his wife, Peggy Pizzo, helped establish The Children's Inn at the NIH, which houses the families of children being treated at NCI.

Pizzo has served as chair of the Association of Academic Health Centers and the Council of Deans of the Association of American Medical Colleges. He was elected to the board of directors of the American Society for Clinical Oncology and the Infectious Diseases Society of America. He led two major NAM reports: Relieving Pain in America: A Blueprint for Transforming Prevention, Care, Education and Research (2011) and Dying in America: Improving Quality and Honoring Individual Preferences Near the End of Life (2016). From 2019 - 2022, Pizzo served as co-chair of the National Academy of Medicine Initiative on Climate and Human Health. In 2025 Pizzo began work as a volunteer in Spiritual Care Chaplaincy, focused on patients in skilled nursing centers.

== Personal life ==
Pizzo married Peggy Daly in 1967, who worked in early childhood education and public policy and served as a senior scholar in Stanford's School of Education. They have four grandchildren. Pizzo has been a marathon runner for more than five decades.

== Awards and honors ==
- Barbara Bohen Pfiefer Award for Scientific Excellence, 1991
- Public Health Service Outstanding Service Medal, 1995
- Member, Institute of Medicine (now the National Academy of Medicine), 1997
- Member, Association of American Physicians
- Member, American Society of Clinical Investigation
- Member, American Pediatric Society
- Elizabeth Kubler-Ross Award, 2008
- Ronald McDonald Charities Award of Excellence, 2009
- John Howland Award (the top award given by the American Pediatric Society), 2012
- John and Emma Bonica Public Service Award, 2013
- John Stearns Medal for Distinguished Contributions in Clinical Practice, 2019
- International Immunocompromised Host Society Lifetime Achievement Award, 2021

== Books ==
Pizzo is the author of 650 scientific articles and review articles, and the editor or co-editor of 16 books and monographs, including:

- Principles and practice of pediatric oncology (First edition, 1989; seventh edition, 2016, Philadelphia: Wolters Kluwer) with David Poplack. Subsequent edits are published as Pizzo and Poplack's Pediatric Oncology.
- Pediatric AIDS: The Challenge of HIV Infection in Infants, Children, and Adolescents (First edition, 1991; third edition, 1999, Baltimore: Williams & Wilkins) with Catherine Wilfert
- Be a Friend: Children Who Live With HIV Speak (1994, Albert Whitman & Co) with Lori Wiener and Aprille Best
