= Allan Macy Butler =

American physician (1894–1986)

- Born: April 3, 1894; Yonkers, New York
- Died: October 7, 1986 (aged 92); Tisbury, Massachusetts
- Education: Harvard Medical School
- Known for: Electrolyte intravenous solutions for treating diarrhea and deydration
- Medical career
- Field: Pediatrics
- Institutions: Massachusetts General hospital
- Awards: John Howland Award (1969)

Allan Macy Butler (1894–1986) was an American pediatrician and Chief of the Children's Medical Services at Massachusetts General Hospital and a professor of Pediatrics at Harvard Medical School. A pioneer in health services, Butler sought to change the structure of the American "fee-for-service" system of health care to one based on government-paid medical care for the elderly and low-income people.

== Early life and education ==
Butler was born April 3, 1894, in Yonkers, New York. The son of George Prentice Butler, a stockbroker, he was one of eight children. Butler spent World War I overseas, serving as an artillery officer in the American Expeditionary Forces. Afterward, he served in Poland as part of the Hoover Commission. Butler entered Harvard Medical School in 1922, graduating in 1926.

== Career ==
After graduating in 1926, he worked at the Rockefeller Institute. It was there that he developed an interest in fluid and electrolyte metabolism. During World War II, he worked on life-raft studies conducted by the Office of Scientific Research and Development that led to advancements in treating diarrhea and dehydration.

In 1929, Butler returned to Harvard as an instructor in pediatrics. He attained the title of Professor of Pediatrics in 1944 and served as Chief of Children's Medical Service and Staff Physician in charge of the Chemical Laboratories at Massachusetts General Hospital. He would remain at these two posts, concurrently, until 1960.

=== Advocacy ===
Butler's advocacy for medical insurance and pre-paid methods of health care embroiled him in the socialized medicine debate. He would also face a loyalty review by the Civil Service Commission Loyalty Review Board. After his trial he provided support in the form of testimony and letters for colleagues who were being tried under the Subversive Activities Control Act of 1950.

He was a dedicated opponent of the Vietnam War and a supporter of abortion rights, nuclear disarmament, and nonviolent resistance.

== Legacy ==
In 1969, Butler received the American Pediatric Society's highest award, the John Howland Award.

He died at his home in Tisbury, Massachusetts on October 7, 1986.
