= Ethel Collins Dunham =

American physician

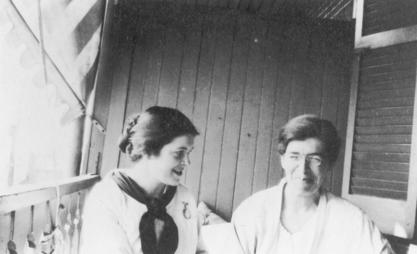
Martha May Eliot and Ethel Collins Dunham, 1915. From the Schlesinger Library, Radcliffe Institute, Harvard University.

Ethel Collins Dunham (1883–1969) was an American pediatrician. Dunham specialized in the care of preterm babies and infants, becoming chief of child development at the United States Children's Bureau in 1935. She established national standards for the hospital care of newborn children and expanded the scope of healthcare for growing children by monitoring their progress in regular home visits by Children's Bureau staff.

== Biography ==
Ethel Collins Dunham was born in Hartford, Connecticut, in 1883 to Samuel G. Dunham, a wealthy utility executive, and Alice Collins. She graduated from high school in 1901 and spent the next two years at boarding school. After several years of travel and leisure pursuits, she decided to study medicine and enrolled in a physics class at Hartford Public High School. She graduated from Bryn Mawr College in 1914 and began her medical training at the Johns Hopkins School of Medicine the same year alongside her partner, Martha May Eliot.

Dunham completed an internship in pediatrics at Johns Hopkins Hospital under John Howland, and then served as the first female resident at New Haven Hospital. She became one of Yale School of Medicine's first female professors. She was appointed instructor at Yale School of Medicine in 1920, promoted to assistant professor in 1924, and then to associate clinical professor in 1927. During this time she developed a special interest in improving the health of premature and newborn babies. She introduced numerous innovations at Yale, including buying a car so that interns could perform home visits for new mothers and their babies. She also reorganized the dispensary appointment system and negotiated with the chief of obstetrics to allow pediatricians to help care for new babies in the hospital nursery. In 1933 she presented her research on perinatal mortality to the American Pediatric Society, which then appointed her head of its committee on neonatal studies.

In 1935, Dunham was appointed chief of child development at the Children's Bureau. Martha May Eliot had been appointed assistant chief. Dunham's first initiative was to investigate the treatment of premature babies and establish national standards for the care of newborns. The results of her first study appeared in 1936, and in 1943 her guidelines were published as "Standards and Recommendations for the Hospital Care of Newborn Infants, Full Term and Premature". She also launched new programs to take hospital healthcare into the homes of new mothers, via the efforts of a public health nurse and a Children's Bureau social worker, who followed the progress of babies after their discharge from New York Hospital. The results of her survey shaped policies and practices in many health districts. From 1949 to 1951 she studied the problem of premature birth with an international team of experts for the World Health Organization in Geneva.

Dunham retired in 1952. In 1957, the American Pediatric Society awarded her their highest honor, the John Howland Award. Dunham was the first woman pediatrician to receive the award; her life partner, Martha May Eliot was the second in 1967.
