= Horace Hodes =

American pediatrician and researcher

Horace Louis Hodes
- Born: December 21, 1907; Philadelphia, Pennsylvania, US
- Died: April 24, 1989 (aged 81); North Shore University Hospital, New York, US
- Education: Perelman School of Medicine
- Alma mater: University of Pennsylvania
- Awards: John Howland Award (1982)
- Scientific career
- Fields: Pediatrics; Infectious diseases

Horace Louis Hodes (December 21, 1907 – April 24, 1989) was an American pediatrician and infectious disease researcher. He was the first to isolate rotavirus, he demonstrated that the Japanese encephalitis virus is transmitted by mosquitoes, and he discovered that vitamin D increases intestinal absorption of calcium. He spent his early career at Johns Hopkins Hospital and later became the chief of pediatrics at Mount Sinai Hospital in Manhattan and a professor at the Icahn School of Medicine at Mount Sinai.

== Early life ==
Horace Hodes was born in Philadelphia, United States, on December 21, 1907. He was the eldest of six children; two of his younger brothers died in infancy from diphtheria. He attended the University of Pennsylvania, completing his undergraduate degree in 1928 and being graduated from the Perelman School of Medicine in 1931. As a first-year medical student, he and his classmate, Milton Rappaport, discovered that the primary effect of vitamin D is to increase intestinal absorption of calcium. After graduation from medical school, Hodes married Anne Reber.

== Career ==
Hodes worked as an intern and resident at the Children's Hospital of Philadelphia until 1935, when he moved to Baltimore to take up a position at the Harriet Lane Home of Johns Hopkins Hospital as the dispensary director. In 1936, he developed a method that used ultraviolet light to reduce the infectiousness of viruses, a technique that later was used to create commercial vaccines against rabies and influenza. He became a pediatrician at Johns Hopkins in 1938 while also serving as the medical director of Sydenham Hospital for Communicable Diseases. During an outbreak of diarrhea in 1942, he isolated the first virus known to cause diarrhea, later identified as rotavirus. The same year, he became the first to isolate the measles virus from the brain of a child who had died from measles encephalitis. While stationed in Guam with the U.S. Navy in World War II, he discovered that the Japanese encephalitis virus was spread by mosquitoes. Hodes continued working in Baltimore after World War II, and started teaching at the Johns Hopkins School of Medicine and School of Hygiene, as well as the University of Maryland School of Medicine.

In 1949, Hodes moved to New York City to become the chief of pediatrics at Mount Sinai Hospital. There, he studied poliovirus and was involved in the development of the polio vaccine. He established the Jack Martin Polio Respirator Center at Mount Sinai, the first center of its kind in New York City, in 1953. After helping to found the Icahn School of Medicine at Mount Sinai, Hodes was appointed the first Herbert H. Lehman Professor and Chairman of Pediatrics in 1964. He retired from clinical practice in 1976, but remained an active researcher, focusing on endotoxins.

== Death ==
Hodes died of prostate cancer at North Shore University Hospital on April 24, 1989, at the age of 81.

== Honors ==
Hodes received the E. Mead Johnson Award in 1946 for his research on viral diarrhea. He served as president of the American Pediatric Society in 1974–1975 and was the subject of a Festschrift in The Journal of Pediatrics in 1975. He received the John Howland Award, the highest honor of the APS, in 1982.
