= L. Emmett Holt Jr. =

American physician

- Born: 1895; New York, US
- Died: 30 November 1974 (aged 79); Myrtle Beach, South Carolina, US
- Father: Luther Emmett Holt
- Medical career
- Field: Pediatrics
- Institutions: Johns Hopkins University
- Sub-specialties: Pediatric nutrition
- Awards: John Howland Award

Luther Emmett Holt Jr. (1895–1974) was an American pediatrician. As a faculty member at Johns Hopkins University and later New York University, he performed extensive research in the field of pediatric nutrition. He received the John Howland Award in 1966.

== Biography ==
Holt was born in New York, in 1895, to pediatrician Luther Emmett Holt. He graduated from Harvard University in 1916 and finished medical school at Johns Hopkins University in 1920. As a student at Johns Hopkins, he worked in William Henry Howell's laboratory and assisted in the research that led to the discovery of heparin. After graduating, he trained in pediatrics for a year at the Babies Hospital (now Morgan Stanley Children's Hospital) in New York City before returning to Johns Hopkins in 1922.

Holt practiced pediatrics at Johns Hopkins for 22 years under the leadership of Edwards A. Park and John Howland. In 1943, he revised and published a new edition of his father's textbook Holt's Care and Feeding of Children. He left Johns Hopkins in 1944 and returned to New York City, where he was appointed director of pediatrics at Bellevue Hospital and chair of the pediatrics department at the New York University School of Medicine. In 1947, he organized the first International Congress of Pediatrics since the end of World War II; that same year, he was awarded the Order of the White Lion for recommending oral feeding as treatment during a Czechoslovak epidemic of diarrhea in children. His contributions to international pediatrics also earned him the Order of the Star of Jordan.

Holt retired in 1960 and received the John Howland Award, the highest honor given by the American Pediatric Society, in 1966. He died in Myrtle Beach, South Carolina, in 1974, aged 79.

== Research ==
Holt began his research career as a medical student. At Johns Hopkins, he studied calcium metabolism and its association with rickets. His main field of research was pediatric nutrition. His research into fat absorption in premature babies led to the development of a popular infant formula, while his studies on the nutritional requirements of infants provided data for parenteral nutrition regimes. He also studied fat emulsion as a method of intravenous nutrition, the treatment of maple syrup urine disease through diet control, and the human requirements for various B vitamins. Outside of nutrition, he also published research on topics including lead poisoning, leukemia, meningitis, eczema, and pertussis.
