= Samuel Levine =

Samuel Levine may refer to:

- Samuel Levine (mobster) (1903–1972), American mobster
- Samuel A. Levine (1891–1966), cardiologist
- Samuel A.A. Levine, Commissioner of the New York City Department of Consumer and Worker Protection
- Samm Levine (born 1982), actor
- Samuel Z. Levine (1895–1971), American pediatrician
