= Saul Krugman =

American physician and medical researcher

- Born: April 7, 1911; Bronx, New York, U.S
- Died: October 26, 1995 (aged 84)
- Education: Ohio State University; University of Richmond; Medical College of Virginia; New York University (NYU)
- Known for: Contributions to Pediatric Infectious Diseases (textbook and primary research), Willowbrook Hepatitis Studies
- Awards: Robert Koch Prize (Gold, 1978); John Howland Award (1981)
- Scientific career
- Fields: Medical researcher
- Workplaces: New York University (NYU)

Saul Krugman (April 7, 1911 – October 26, 1995) was a physician, and later pediatrician, whose studies of hepatitis, rubella, and measles resulted in the development of vaccinations for these debilitating diseases. The results of these studies were acquired through unethical medical practices involving experimentation on disabled children, which came to light during the Willowbrook State School scandal of 1972.

== Early life ==
The son of Russian Jewish immigrants, Krugman was born in the Bronx on April 7, 1911. He began his undergraduate studies at Ohio State University in 1929 and, after taking time off following his junior year to earn money so he could complete his studies, graduated from the University of Richmond in 1934.

== Education and career ==
Krugman began his medical studies at the Medical College of Virginia. After service during World War II as a flight surgeon in the South Pacific, he went on to pursue research at New York University (NYU).

Krugman was the first to distinguish hepatitis A from hepatitis B, and made great strides in describing their different characteristics and behaviors. While examining blood samples from patients with hepatitis at NYU, Krugman discovered that heating blood containing hepatitis B would kill the virus while preserving an antibody response when used as a vaccine. From 1958 to 1964, Krugman conducted human testing and trials with live hepatitis virus. After subjects, Krugman and his team would then experiment with developing a vaccine to be used to protect United States military personnel from the chronic and often fatal disease.

Krugman engaged in human experimentation. Under his direction, a number of children with intellectual disabilities were intentionally infected with hepatitis A at the Willowbrook State School. According to the celebrated vaccinologist Maurice Hilleman, "They [the Willowbrook studies] were the most unethical medical experiments ever performed on children in the United States."

Krugman was awarded the 1983 Mary Woodard Lasker Public Service Award. In the words of the Lasker Committee:

"Dr. Krugman’s most far-reaching achievement concerns viral hepatitis. In a long and elegant sequence of studies beginning in the mid-1950s, he proved that “infectious” (type A) hepatitis, transmitted by the fecal-oral route, and the more serious “serum” (type B) hepatitis, transmitted by blood, body secretions, and sexual contact, were caused by two immunologically distinct viruses." These studies were sponsored by the Armed Forces Epidemiological Board, Office of the Surgeon General, U.S. Army and approved by the New York State Department of Mental Hygiene. The ethics of the Willowbrook Studies have been widely debated.

In 1972, Krugman became the president of the American Pediatric Society.

He died on October 26, 1995, in Fort Lauderdale, Florida.

=== Human experimentation ===
Between 1963 and 1966, Krugman promised parents that their children would be enrolled in Willowbrook in exchange for signing a consent form for procedures that he claimed were "vaccinations". However, in reality, the procedures involved deliberately infecting children with viral hepatitis by feeding them an extract made from the feces of patients who were infected with the disease.

== See also ==
- Human experimentation in the United States
