= Hattie Alexander =

American pediatrician and microbiologist

Hattie E. Alexander
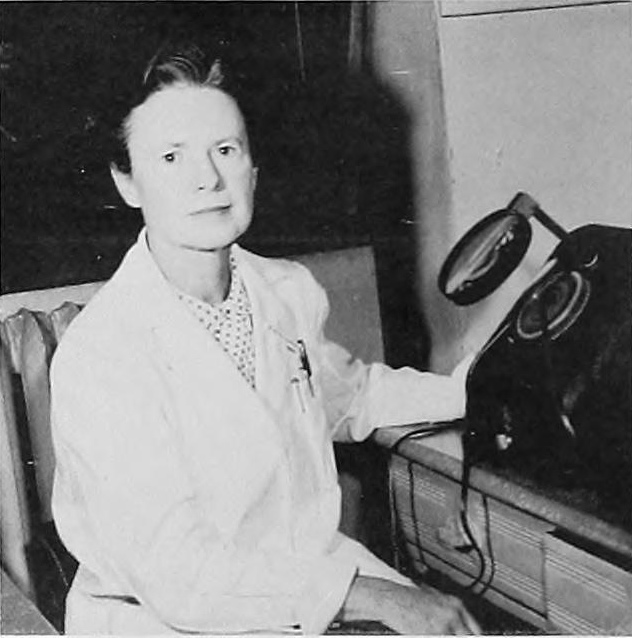
- Alexander, c. 1960
- Born: April 5, 1901; Baltimore, Maryland
- Died: June 24, 1968 (aged 67); New York City
- Education: Goucher College (BA); Johns Hopkins University (MD)
- Known for: Haemophilus influenzae, antibiotic resistance
- Awards: E. Mead Johnson Award (1943)
- Scientific career
- Fields: Pediatrics and microbiology

Hattie Elizabeth Alexander (April 5, 1901 – June 24, 1968) was an American pediatrician and microbiologist. She earned her M.D. from Johns Hopkins University in 1930 and continued her research and medical career at Columbia-Presbyterian Hospital in New York City. Alexander became the lead microbiologist and the head of the bacterial infections program at Columbia-Presbyterian. She occupied many prestigious positions at Columbia University and was well honored even after her death from liver cancer in 1968. Alexander is known for her development of the first effective remedies for Haemophilus influenzae infection, as well as being one of the first scientists to identify and study antibiotic resistance. She has received many awards and honors including the E. Mead Johnson Award in 1942 for her headway in pediatric research and antibiotic resistance. Alexander's research and studies helped lay the ground work for research into antibiotic and vaccine development.

== Early life and education ==
Alexander was born in Baltimore, Maryland, on April 5, 1901, the second of seven children. Her birth was not registered properly, thus later on in her life she had to provide proof of her baptism in order to receive a passport. Alexander distinguished herself throughout school, so much so that her high school English teacher obtained a full scholarship for her at Goucher College. Alexander graduated from Goucher College in 1923 with a bachelor's of arts degree in bacteriology and physiology. One of the first jobs Alexander had after she graduated was in the National Laboratory in Washington, D.C., as a bacteriologist. Here she met and impressed the director of the laboratory, Septima Smith, who helped to financially support Alexander in medical school. She worked for the United States Public Health Service and the Maryland Public Health Service, and was initially enrolled at the University of Maryland before she transferred to Johns Hopkins University medical school, where she received her M.D. in 1930 with a focus on pediatrics. Alexander's mentor during medical school was Dr. Edwards Park. Another professor at Johns Hopkins, Rustin McIntosh, helped develop her interest in pediatrics. She completed her internship at Baltimore's Harriet Lane Home located at Johns Hopkins Hospital. Alexander was afterwards a resident at Columbia-Presbyterian Medical Center's Babies Hospital in New York City, due to an invitation from Dr. McIntosh, where she stayed for the rest of her career.

== Career ==
In 1932, Alexander became an instructor and researcher in the Department of Pediatrics at Columbia University, where she spent her entire professional career. Here, Alexander slowly made her way up the professional hierarchy, starting as the Holt Fellow in Diseases of Children in 1932, Assistant in Diseases of Children in 1934, and Instructor in Diseases of Children in 1935. From 1936 to 1943, Alexander was the associate in pediatrics before continuing to work her way up the professional chain by becoming assistant professor in 1943, associate professor in 1948, and finally professor from 1958. She retired in 1966. While at the Columbia-Presbyterian Babies Hospital, Alexander became the main authority on bacterial infections and the lead microbiologist in the laboratory. From 1941 to 1945, she served as a consultant to Secretary of War Henry L. Stimson on the Influenza Commission. Alexander was the first woman to serve as president of the American Pediatric Society. Alexander died of liver cancer in New York City on June 24, 1968. Her obituary was published in The New York Times and The Baltimore Sun, which recognized her for producing the first treatment for influenzal meningitis.

== Research ==
Alexander's work aimed to advance research of infectious diseases and the biology of the microorganisms that cause meningitis in a time before antibiotics or vaccinations. Her research focused primarily on the mechanisms and effects of meningitis in children, which at the time had a high mortality rate. Alexander started her studies by trying to identify the prognostic and diagnostic strategies of meningitis. She was able to successfully identify in one of her early studies the prognostic ability of cerebrospinal fluid in precipitin tests. Hattie noted that those with a positive precipitin test result had a higher rate of mortality than those with a negative result.

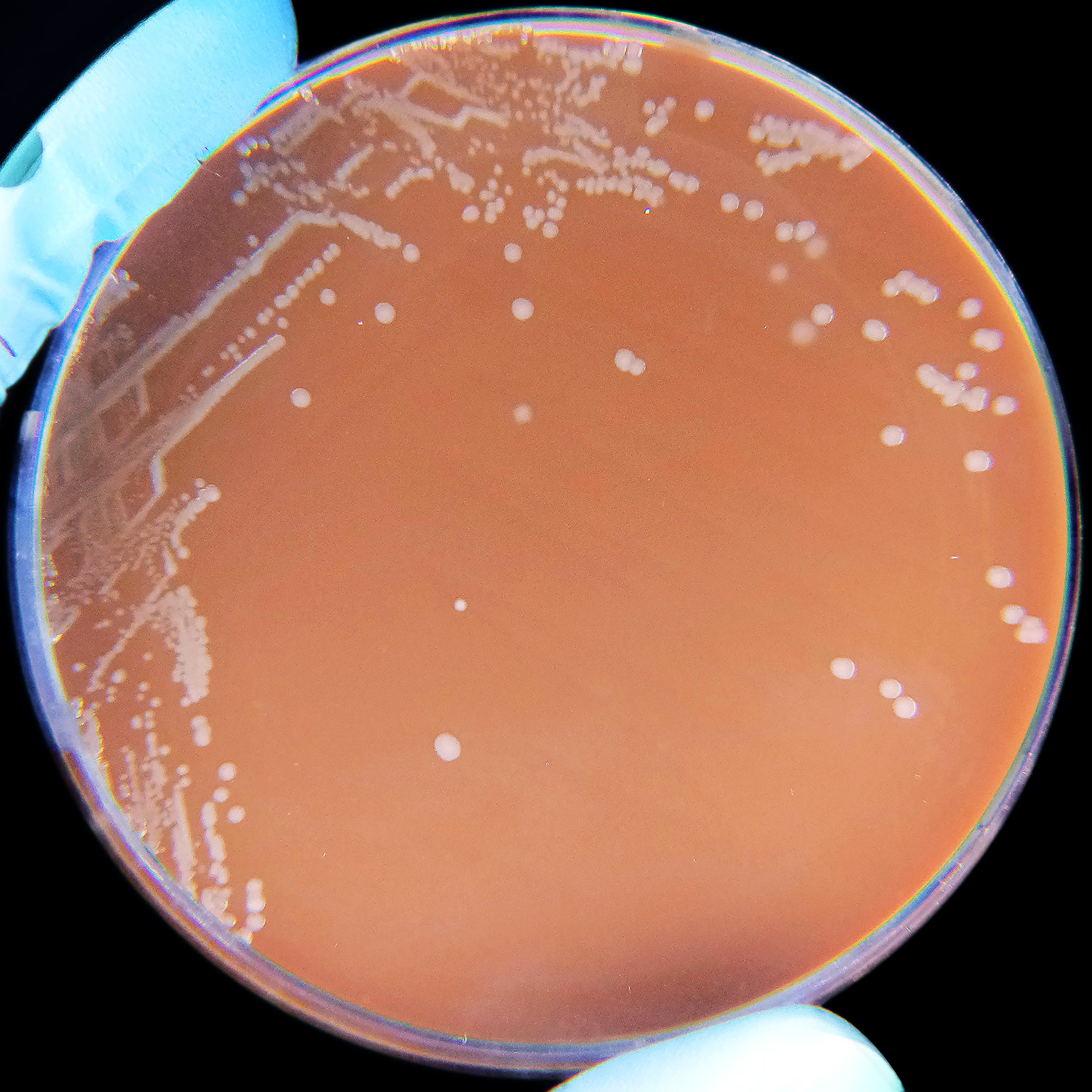
Culture of Haemophilus influenzae type b bacteria which causes meningitis in many infants and children.

In the wake of the development of an anti-pneumonia serum at New York's Rockefeller Institute, Alexander reported a cure rate for infants of 75% with influenzal meningitis in 1939. In the early 1940s, Alexander began researching Haemophilus influenzae (Hib) meningitis, at the time an almost invariably fatal disease in infants and young children. She started experimenting with rabbit serum and in 1939 she referenced in one of her research papers that the results looked promising for children. Alexander later experimented with sulfonamides and its effects on pyogenic meningitis. She concluded that sulfonamides are insufficient in treating meningitis alone, and those who were treated with sulfonamides and recovered only did due to the antibodies that they produced. These experiments led her to develop an improved antiserum for the disease; by combining rabbit serum therapy with the use of sulfa drugs. This combination became the lead treatment of meningitis until antibiotics.

By developing standardized techniques for diagnosis and treatment, she and her associate Grace Leidy helped reduce the mortality rate from Hib from nearly 100 percent to less than 25 percent. Later, Alexander and Leidy studied the effect of antibiotics on Hib, finding streptomycin to be highly effective. The combined use of the antiserum, sulfa drugs, and antibiotics significantly lowered the mortality rate from Hib.

In the course of her research on antibiotics, Alexander noted and reported the appearance of antibiotic-resistant strains of Hib. She concluded, correctly, that this was caused by random genetic mutations in DNA which were positively selected through evolution; she and Leidy demonstrated the occurrence of transformation in the Hib bacillus, leading to resistance.

== Awards and honors ==
Alexander received numerous honors and awards for her work, including the E. Mead Johnson Award (1942), the Elizabeth Blackwell Award (1956), and the Oscar B. Hunter Memorial Award (1962). In 1963, she was awarded Babies Hospital Distinguished Service Medal, and in 1964, she was elected president of the American Pediatric Society. She was the first woman to be elected to this position. Even after her death, Hattie Alexander was honored for her service and accomplishments. Alexander received two honorary degrees: one from Goucher College and one from Wheaton College.

== Sources ==
- American National Biography, vol. 1, pp. 270–271.
- CDC biography
- Biography.com profile
- New York Times obituary, June 25, 1968 (subscription required)
- Columbia University: Faculty Remembered
