= Edwards A. Park =

Edwards A. Park may refer to:

- Edwards Amasa Park (1808–1900), American Congregational theologian
- Edwards A. Park (doctor) (1877–1969), American pediatrician
