= Martha May Eliot =

American pediatrician (1891–1978)

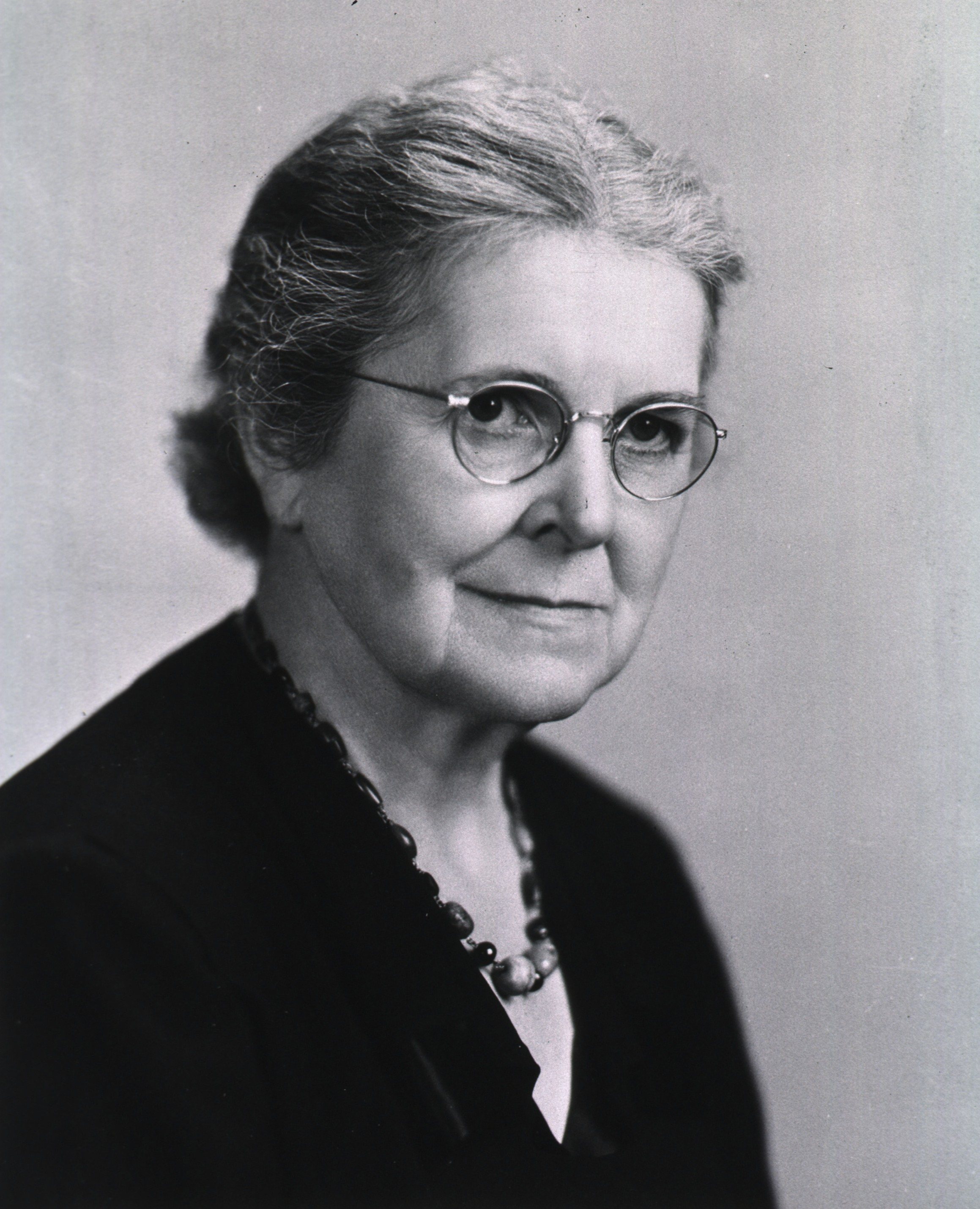
- Born: April 7, 1891; Dorchester, Massachusetts
- Died: February 14, 1978 (aged 86); Cambridge, Massachusetts
- Education: Bryn Mawr College; Johns Hopkins University
- Employer(s): Yale University National Children's Bureau Division of Child and Maternal Health Harvard School of Public Health
- Spouse: Ethel Collins Dunham
- Awards: Mary Woodard Lasker Award for Public Service Sedgwick Memorial Medal John Howland Award

Martha May Eliot (April 7, 1891 – February 14, 1978), was an American pediatrician. She was a specialist in public health, an assistant director for WHO, and an architect of New Deal and postwar programs for maternal and child health. Her first important research, community studies of rickets in New Haven, Connecticut, and Puerto Rico, explored issues at the heart of social medicine. Together with Edwards A. Park, her research established that public health measures (dietary supplementation with vitamin D) could prevent and reverse the early onset of rickets.

== Biography ==
Martha May Eliot was born in Dorchester, Massachusetts in 1891, to Christopher Rhodes Eliot, a Unitarian minister, and Mary Jackson May. Her father was a scion of the Eliot family, an influential American family that is regarded as one of the Boston Brahmins, originating in Boston, whose ancestors became wealthy and held sway over the American education system in the late 19th and early 20th centuries. Her grandfather, William G. Eliot, was the first chancellor of Washington University in St. Louis. The poet, playwright, critic, and Nobel laureate T.S. Eliot was her first cousin.

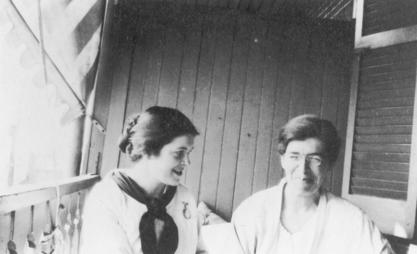
The Schlesinger Library, Radcliffe Institute, Harvard University. Martha May Eliot and Ethel Collins Dunham, 1915

During undergraduate study at Bryn Mawr College she met Ethel Collins Dunham, who was to become her life partner. After completing their undergraduate education, the two enrolled together at Johns Hopkins University School of Medicine in 1914.

In 1918, Eliot graduated from medical school at Johns Hopkins University. As early as her second year of medical school, Dr. Eliot hoped to become "some kind of social doctor." She taught at Yale University's department of pediatrics from 1921 to 1935. For most of these years, Dr. Eliot also directed the National Children's Bureau Division of Child and Maternal Health (1924–1934). She later accepted a full-time position at the bureau, becoming bureau chief in 1951. In 1956, she left the bureau to become department chairman of child and maternal health at Harvard School of Public Health.

During her tenure at the Children's Bureau, Eliot helped establish government programs that implemented her ideas about social medicine, and she was responsible for drafting most of the Social Security Act's language dealing with maternal and child health. During World War II, she administered the Emergency Maternity and Infant Care program, which provided maternity care for greater than 1 million servicemen's wives. After the war, she held influential positions in both the World Health Organization and United Nations Children's Fund (UNICEF). From 1949 to 1951, Eliot worked as an assistant director for WHO in Geneva. In 1959, Martha accepted a post as chair of the Massachusetts Commission on Children and Youth, a position she held for a decade.

She served as the chief architect of health provisions for children in the 1935 US Social Security Act, that mandated that every state establish child health services. In 1946, she served as the vice chair of the US delegation to the International Health Conference and on behalf of the US, signed the constitution that established the World Health Organization (she was the only woman to sign WHO's constitution).

Martha May Eliot died in Cambridge, Massachusetts on February 14, 1978.

== Personal life ==
Martha May Eliot had a long domestic partnership with Ethel Collins Dunham, also a pioneering female pediatrician. They met at Bryn Mawr in 1910 and were together until Dunham's death in 1969.

== Awards and honors ==
In 1948, Eliot received the Mary Woodard Lasker Award for Public Service. From 1949 to 1950, she was president of the National Conference of Social Work. In 1951, President of the United States Harry S. Truman named Eliot chief of the Children's Bureau. She also received the 1967 John Howland Award.

In 1947, she became the first woman to be elected president of the American Public Health Association (APHA). She was also the first woman to receive APHA's Sedgwick Memorial Medal in 1958. APHA established the Martha May Eliot Award in 1964 to honor extraordinary health service to mothers and children.
