= Samuel Z. Levine =

American pediatrician (1895–1971)

- Born: 1895; New York City, United States
- Died: July 14, 1971 (aged 75–76); New York City, United States
- Occupation: Pediatrician
- Awards: John Howland Award (1964)

Academic background
- Education: City College of New York; Cornell University Medical College

Samuel Zachary Levine (1895 – July 14, 1971) was an American pediatrician who was a professor of pediatrics at Cornell University Medical College. His research focused on neonatology, particularly physiology of premature infants. He served as president of both th Society for Pediatric Research and served the American Pediatric Society.

After retiring in 1961, Levine received the John Howland Award, the highest honor bestowed by the APS, in 1964. In 1963, he was summoned by the White House to treat Patrick Bouvier Kennedy, the premature son of President John F. Kennedy.

== Personal life ==
Levine was born in 1895 in New York City to Mendel and Rose Levine. He graduated from Townsend Harris High School in Queens in 1912 before attending the City College of New York. In 1916, he enrolled at Cornell University Medical College, graduating in 1920.

== Career ==
Levine interned at Mount Sinai Hospital between 1920 and 1922 and served as a resident at Boston Children's Hospital between 1922 and 1923. In 1924, he returned to New York when he was appointed chairman of Cornell's department of pediatrics, which was then located at New York Nursery and Child's Hospital. At Nursery and Child's, he began to publish extensively on respiratory physiology in infants and children.

He was appointed assistant professor at Cornell University Medical College in 1930. In 1932, Levine began a ten-year research collaboration with his colleague Harry Gordon, who was previously a medical student taught by Levine. Levine and Gordon's research focused on the physiology of newborn babies, including full-term and premature infants, for which they won the first Borden Award of the American Academy of Pediatrics in 1944.

In 1936, Levine succeeded his mentor, Oscar Schloss, as professor of pediatrics and pediatrician-in-chief of New York Hospital–Cornell Medical Center, a position he held until his retirement in 1961. From 1947, he led numerous international missions with the World Health Organization and the Unitarian Universalist Service Committee. Levine was a founding member and one-time president of the Society for Pediatric Research and served as president of the American Pediatric Society (APS).

=== Post-retirement career ===
Despite formally retiring in 1961, he remained active in his field. In 1964, he received the highest honor of the APS, the John Howland Award.

In August 1963, the White House arranged for Levine to be flown from New York to Boston by the U.S. Air Force and taken by helicopter to a local hospital to treat Patrick Bouvier Kennedy, the premature infant born to President John F. Kennedy and Jacqueline Kennedy. Levine was summoned because he had previously assisted in the care of a premature baby born to Jacqueline Kennedy's sister, Lee Radziwill.

== Personal life and death ==
He married Bella Morell in 1922, with whom he had four children. Levine died from a heart attack on July 14, 1971, at his home in Manhattan's Upper East Side.

== Honors ==
- 1944: Borden Award (American Academy of Pediatrics); shared with Harry Gordon
- 1964: John Howland Award (American Pediatric Society)
