= John Howland Award =

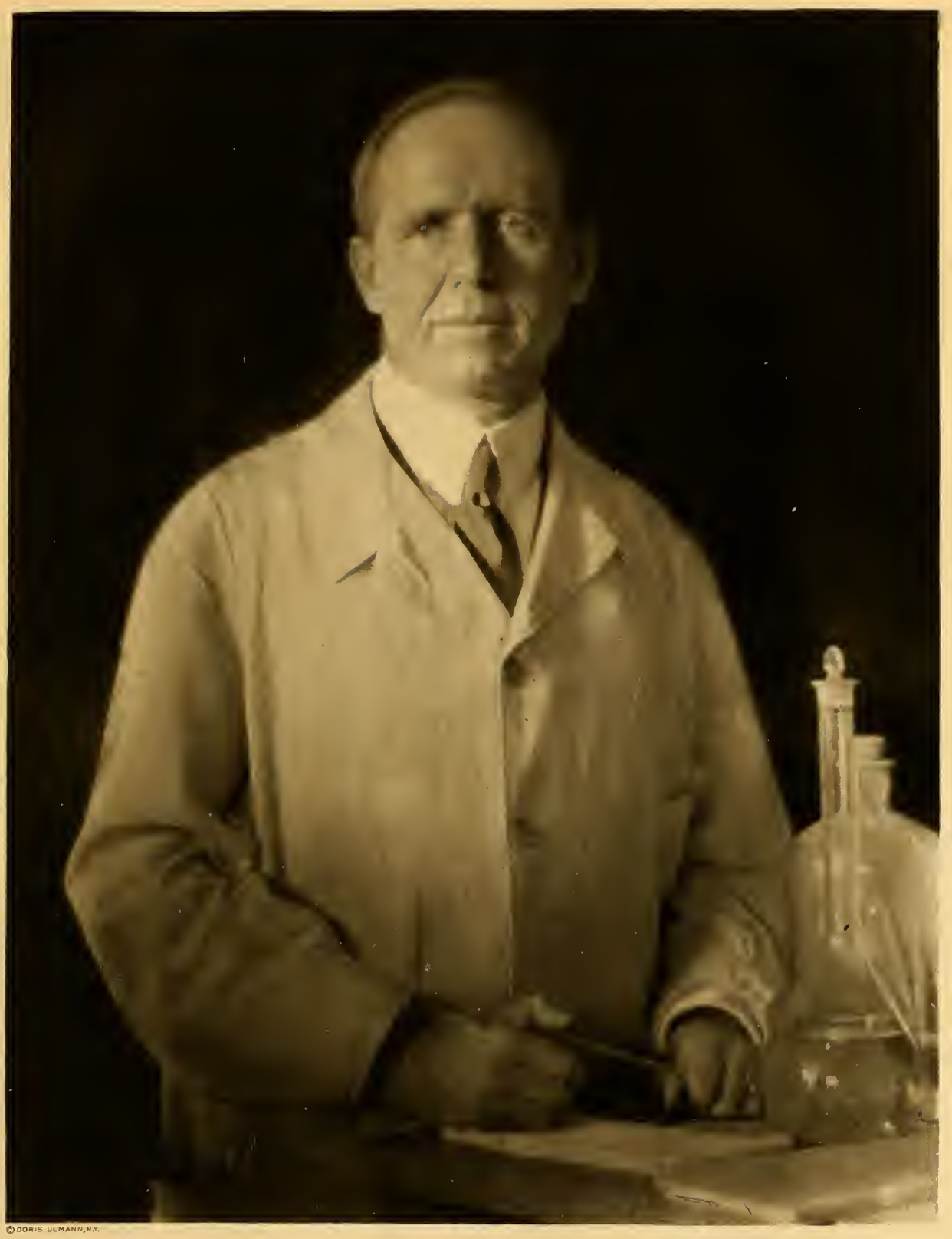
1922 portrait of Dr. John Howland, the namesake of the award

The John Howland Award is the highest honor bestowed by the American Pediatric Society (APS). Named in honor of John Howland (1873–1926), the award, with its accompanying medal, is presented annually by the American Pediatric Society for "distinguished service to pediatrics as a whole."

Since 1952, when Edwards A. Park, M.D., received the inaugural Howland Award, this honor has been bestowed upon esteemed leaders in academic pediatrics whose significant contributions have advanced the lives of children and the profession of pediatrics through clinical care, scientific discovery, mentorship and service.

Dr. Bonnie W. Ramsey, selected for the 2025 award, is the most recent Howland Awardee.

== Description ==
Article II of the APS Constitution forms the actual basis for the selection of the Howland recipient, which states:

The objectives of this Society shall be to bring together men and women for the advancement of the study of children and their diseases, for the prevention of illness and the promotion of health in childhood, for the promotion of pediatric education and research, and to honor those who, by their contributions to pediatrics, have aided in its advancement.

== History ==
The award has been described as what "may be the most coveted award in all of pediatrics" in a 2003 journal article. Since 1976, a formal dinner has been held to honor the recipient of the Howland Award.

Dr. Ethel Collins Dunham became the first woman to receive the award in 1957. Her partner, Dr. Martha May Eliot became the second woman to receive the award in 1967.

== Award recipients ==
Source: APS

- 1952 Edwards A. Park (doctor)
- 1953 Grover F. Powers
- 1954 Bela Schick
- 1955 James Gamble (pediatrician)
- 1956 Harold K. Faber
- 1957 Ethel C. Dunham
- 1958 Irvine McQuarrie
- 1959 Daniel C. Darrow
- 1960 Bronson Crothers
- 1961 Rustin McIntosh
- 1962 Joseph Stokes
- 1963 Lawson Wilkins
- 1964 Samuel Z. Levine
- 1965 John Caffey
- 1966 L. Emmett Holt, Jr.
- 1967 Martha M. Eliot
- 1968 Paul Gyorgy
- 1969 Allan Macy Butler
- 1970 Josef Warkany
- 1971 Helen B. Taussig
- 1972 Waldo E. Nelson
- 1973 Louis K. Diamond
- 1974 Albert B. Sabin
- 1975 Harry H. Gordon
- 1976 Clement A. Smith
- 1977 A. Ashley Weech
- 1978 Charles Alderson Janeway
- 1979 Amos U. Christie
- 1980 C. Henry Kempe
- 1981 Saul Krugman
- 1982 Horace L. Hodes
- 1983 Helen C. Harrison and Harold E. Harrison
- 1984 Henry L. Barnett
- 1985 Wolf W. Zuelzer
- 1986 Richard L. Day
- 1987 Robert A. Good
- 1988 Joseph Dancis
- 1989 Barton Childs
- 1990 Julius Richmond
- 1991 Robert E. Cooke and Roland B. Scott
- 1992 Gilbert B. Forbes
- 1993 Lewis A. Barness
- 1994 Sydney S. Gellis
- 1995 Floyd W. Denny
- 1996 Mildred T. Stahlman
- 1997 Melvin M. Grumbach
- 1998 Robert J. Haggerty
- 1999 Abraham M. Rudolph
- 2000 Samuel Katz
- 2001 Delbert A. Fisher
- 2002 Howard A. Pearson
- 2003 David G. Nathan
- 2004 Frederick C. Battaglia
- 2005 Mary Ellen Avery
- 2006 Kurt Hirschhorn
- 2007 Ralph D. Feigin
- 2008 Richard B. Johnston
- 2009 Jerold F. Lucey
- 2010 Charles R. Scriver
- 2011 Russell W. Chesney
- 2012 Philip A. Pizzo
- 2013 Elizabeth R. McAnarney
- 2014 Rebecca Hatcher Buckley
- 2015 Catherine D. DeAngelis
- 2016 Barbara J. Stoll
- 2017 Michael Weitzman
- 2018 Thomas F. Boat
- 2019 David K. Stevenson
- 2020 Kathryn M. Edwards
- 2021 Sherin U. Devaskar
- 2022 Richard J. Whitley
- 2023 Yvonne Maldonado
- 2024 Alan Jobe
- 2025 Bonnie W. Ramsey

== See also ==
- List of medicine awards
