= Michael Weitzman =

American pediatrician

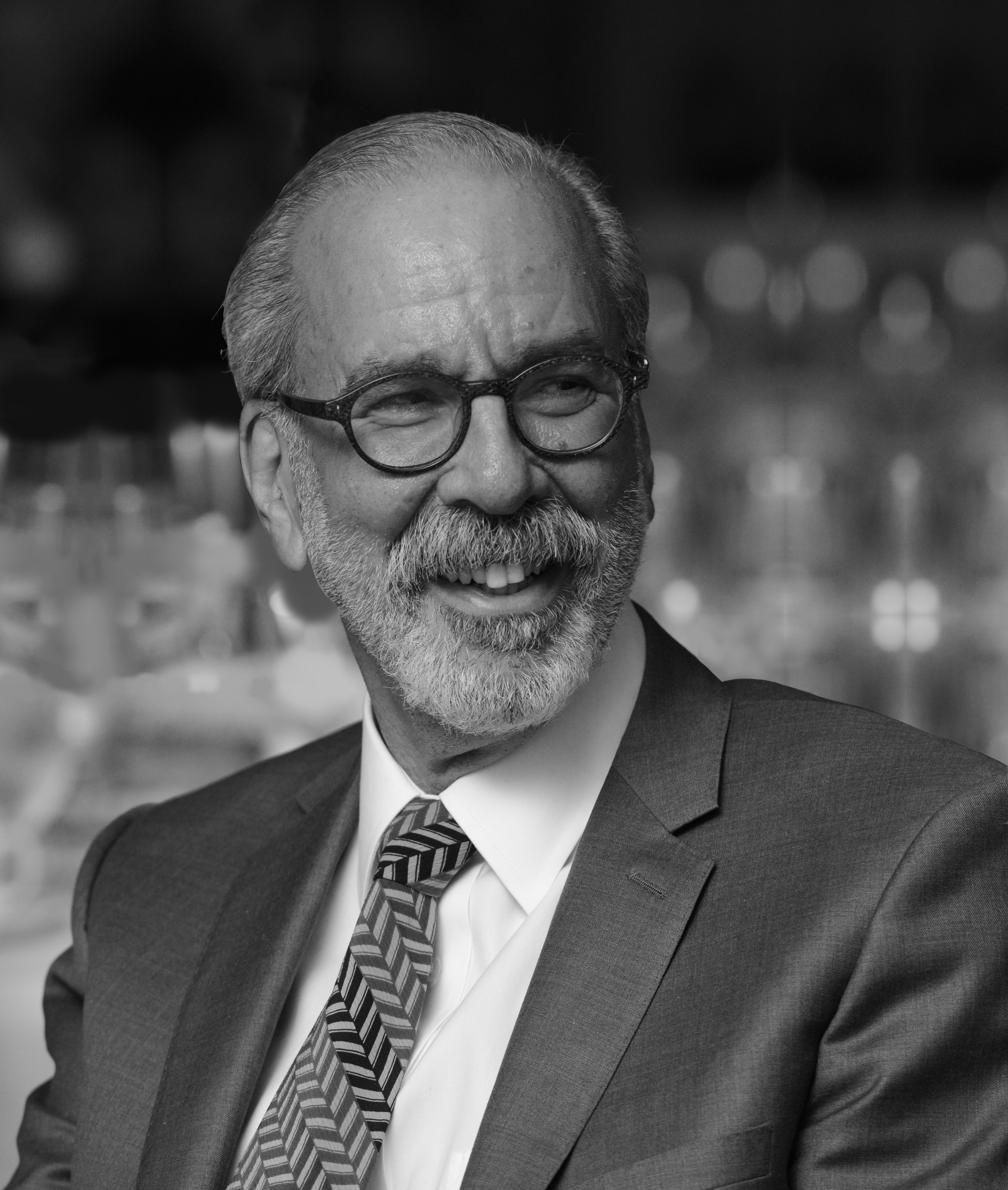
- Weitzman at Howland Award Dinner
- Born: January 16, 1948 (age 78); Brooklyn
- Education: State University of New York Upstate Medical University (MD)
- Occupation: Pediatrician

Michael Weitzman (born January 16, 1948) is an American pediatrician specializing in public health and policy. He is known for his research focusing on the social and environmental determinants of child health. He has published over 150 articles in medical and scientific journals on the damaging effects of second-hand smoke, lead exposure, and countless other determinants of children's health and behavior. From 1999-2005 he served as the executive director of the Center for Child Health Research, a national research institute created by the American Academy of Pediatrics.

Weitzman served as chairman of the department of pediatrics at the New York University School of Medicine from 2005 until 2007. He currently is a professor at New York University with appointments in the departments of pediatrics, environmental medicine, and global public health. He is the 2017 American Pediatric Society's John Howland Award recipient, which is considered the highest honor in academic Pediatrics and is bestowed upon leaders whose significant contributions have advanced the lives of children and the profession of pediatrics through clinical care, scientific discovery, mentorship, and service.

== Education and early career ==
Weitzman went to Stuyvesant High School in Manhattan, New York and graduated in 1964 at the age of 16. Weitzman received his BA from Brooklyn College in 1968 before enrolling at the State University of New York Upstate Medical University where he received his MD degree in 1972 and would continue on to complete a residency in pediatrics in 1975. He received additional training in health administration at the Maxwell School of Citizenship and Public Affairs Syracuse University, and then served as a health services research fellow at the Harvard School of Public Health.

From 1979 to 1989 Weitzman was a professor pediatrics and public health at Boston University, working primarily at Boston City Hospital, where he would become the director of general pediatrics, director of child lead poisoning and treatment programs, and director of maternal and child health for the city of Boston.

Following his time in Boston, Weitzman relocated to Rochester, NY where he became the Director of the Division of General Pediatrics and Pediatrician in Chief at Rochester General Hospital, as well as associate chair of Pediatrics at the University of Rochester Medical Center.

== Lead poisoning research ==
For over 20 years, Weitzman has studied the neurotoxic effects of lead exposure on children. His research on preventing childhood lead exposure has influenced lead policy in several major ways, including: contributing to a paradigm shift from treating lead poisoned children to a primary and secondary prevention approach that involves home investigations and abatements and screening of children to trigger home investigations and repairs. He also has contributed to the current Housing and Urban Development (HUD) and Environmental Protection Agency (EPA) dust lead clearance levels post lead abatement, as well as contributing to the Centers for Disease Control and Prevention (CDC) changing its definition of elevated blood lead levels and its lead screening and treatment guidelines. He served on the CDC Advisory Committee on Childhood Lead Poisoning Prevention from 1997-2002 and the EPA Clean Air Clean Air Scientific Advisory Committee Lead Review Panel from 2010-2013.

== Tobacco research and advocacy ==
Weitzman's tobacco-related work, which includes more than 40 research papers over the past 25 years, has been central to the recognition of the effects or contribution of prenatal tobacco and childhood secondhand smoke exposure, including associations with increase rates of childhood asthma, child mental health and school problems, parental physical and mental health problems and the negative effects of these problems on child health and food insecurity among children of smokers, increased rates of tooth decay and the metabolic syndrome, and most recently, increased rates of sensorineural hearing loss. His health services research had a direct effect on the American Academy of Pediatrics establishing the Julius Richmond Center on Tobacco and Child Health, which leads national efforts to get pediatricians to address parental smoking. Weitzman was a key witness as part of the Department of Justice's federal racketeering case against the tobacco industry. He provided expert testimony regarding the epidemiologic studies of effects of second hand smoke on children.

Currently he serves on the Scientific Advisory Committee for the Food and Drug Administration's (FDA) Tobacco Center.

== Childhood nutrition and obesity research ==
Weitzman's research has also focused on the ways in which malnutrition and food insecurity produce profound effects on child health and development. His research into the positive effect school breakfast programs had on school performance helped to lead to every state in the US implementing school breakfast programs. He has also conducted epidemiological research tracking the percentage of adolescents who meet the criteria for Metabolic syndrome. He has also shown the immense costs associated with childhood obesity.

== Influences on child development and behavior ==
Weitzman has investigated numerous aspects of children's lives that ultimately influence their development and behavior. He was one of the first individuals to study the impact that paternal depression has on childhood development. Weitzman has also demonstrated that delayed school entry is associated with higher rates of extreme behavior. In his role as executive director of the Center for Child Health Research he directed research to focus on the impact poverty plays in psychosocial child development.

== Awards and recognition ==
- Clinical Teaching Award in Pediatrics (1984) - Boston University School of Medicine
- Research Award (1997) - Academic Pediatric Associations
- Mentoring Award in Pediatrics (1998) - The Academic Pediatric Research Association
- Mentoring Award (2004) - The University of Rochester School of Medicine
- EPA's Child Environmental Advocacy Award (2005) - EPA
- APS's John Howland Award (2017)
- Children's Environmental Health Network's Science Award (2017)
