= Bronson Crothers =

American pediatric neurologist

Bronson Crothers (July 10, 1884 – July 17, 1959) was an American pediatric neurologist and a professor at Harvard Medical School. He studied birth trauma, cerebral palsy, and other neurological disabilities in children.

== Early life ==
Bronson Crothers was born in 1884 in Elmira, New York. His father was a Unitarian minister. Crothers grew up in Saint Paul, Minnesota, and later moved with his family to Cambridge, Massachusetts, where he attended Cambridge Latin School. He graduated from Harvard College in 1904 and from Harvard Medical School in 1909.

== Career ==
Crothers completed his residency training at Massachusetts General Hospital and Boston Children's Hospital, and in 1915 he joined the Massachusetts General Hospital Unit of the British Royal Army Medical Corps. When the United States entered the war, he transferred to the U.S. Army Medical Corps. After the war, he studied at the Neurological Institute of New York, and in 1920 he returned to Boston, where he was appointed a neurologist at the Children's Hospital and joined the Harvard faculty. He was appointed clinical professor of pediatrics in 1944 and, upon his retirement, became professor emeritus in 1952.

Crothers' main field of research was neurological birth trauma, referring to injuries to the nervous system that occur during birth, including cerebral palsy, brachial plexus injuries and spinal cord injuries. He wrote about the importance of emotional wellbeing in children with neurological disabilities, and advocated for psychological support to be provided to these children. He served as president of the American Pediatric Society, co-founded the American Academy of Cerebral Palsy, and chaired Herbert Hoover's 1932 White House Conference on Child Health and Protection.

== Death and legacy ==
Crothers died on July 17, 1959, at his summer home in Sorrento, Maine. While the essay on Crothers by William T. McLean, Jr. in Child Neurology: Its Origins, Founders, Growth and Evolution states his cause of death as spinal muscular atrophy, this is not sourced in the essay, is not listed in other obituaries or any other biographies of Crothers, and would be an unusual cause of death for a 75-year-old person without any known disabilities. He was posthumously awarded the John Howland Award by the American Pediatric Society (APS) in 1960. In 1961, Harvard Medical School established the Bronson Crothers Professorship of Neurology. In the 1990 book The Founders of Child Neurology, William T. McLean, Jr. described Crothers as "one of the true greats of child neurology".
