= David G. Nathan =

American pediatrician (born 1929)

David Gordon Nathan (born May 25, 1929) is an American pediatrician and hematologist. He is known for his authorship of Nathan and Oski's Hematology of Infancy and Childhood, a standard reference in pediatrics, currently in its seventh edition. Nathan remains an author on the current edition.

Now retired, he was Robert A. Stranahan professor of pediatrics at Harvard Medical School and served as president of the Dana–Farber Cancer Institute.

== Biography ==
He was born in Boston, Massachusetts on May 26, 1929. He graduated from Harvard Medical School. Nathan was given the John Howland Award, the highest honor bestowed by the American Pediatric Society (APS), in 2003.

== Awards and honors ==
- 2003 John Howland Award
- 1990 National Medal of Science
- 2006 George Kober Medal of the Association of American Physicians
- 2010 Honorary Doctor of Science Harvard University
- 2011 Wallace Coulter Award of the American Society of Hematology

== Sources ==
- Orkin S, et al. (2008). Nathan and Oski's Hematology of Infancy and Childhood (2 Volume Set) (7 ed.). Saunders.
