= Felix Konotey-Ahulu =

Ghanaian physician-scientist (1930–2025)

Felix I. D. Konotey-Ahulu FGA, FRCPSG, FRCP, FWACP
- Born: Felix Israel Domeno Konotey-Ahulu; 12 July 1930; Odumase-Krobo, Gold Coast
- Died: 27 May 2025 (aged 94); London, England
- Other name: Felix Israel Domeno
- Education: Achimota College; University of Ghana; University of London (MB BS)
- Occupations: Professor, physician, scientist
- Known for: Sickle-cell disease research

Felix Israel Domeno Konotey-Ahulu FGA, FRCPSG, FRCP, FWACP (12 July 1930 – 27 May 2025) was a Ghanaian physician and scientist who was Kwegyir Aggrey Distinguished Professor of Human Genetics at the University of Cape Coast, Ghana, and a consultant physician/genetic counsellor, Haemoglobinopathy/Sickle Cell States, in Harley Street, London. He was one of the world's foremost experts on sickle-cell disease.

== Early life and education ==
Felix Israel Domeno Konotey-Ahulu was born on 12 July 1930 in Odumase-Krobo, Gold Coast (now Ghana). The son of a Presbyterian minister, he was educated at Basel/Presbyterian Mission Schools, and at Achimota College (1947–49) where he took the Cambridge School Certificate (Grade I) and the London Matriculation (1st Division), subsequently going to University College of the Gold Coast (1951–53). He went on to London University, where he studied medicine (University College London and Westminster Hospital School of Medicine). He graduated with MB BS, Membership of the Royal College of Surgeons, LRCP in 1959.

After full registration in the UK, he joined the Ghana Civil Service as Medical Officer, with subsequent postings at the University of Ghana Medical School and the Ministry of Health at Korle Bu Teaching Hospital, where he directed the largest sickle-cell disease clinic in the world. Post-graduate studies took him to the Liverpool School of Tropical Medicine, Westminster Hospital, Royal Postgraduate Medical School, Hammersmith, and Professor (later Dame) Sheila Sherlock's Department of Medicine at the Royal Free Hospital, London, where he was Research Fellow.

== Early career ==
He went back to Ghana to Korle-Bu Teaching Hospital and University of Ghana Medical School as Lecturer, then Senior Lecturer. He conducted research into Clinical Haemoglobinopathy and, together with Professors Bela Ringelhann (Hungary), Hermann Lehmann (University of Cambridge), and others he discovered Haemoglobin Korle-Bu and Haemoglobin Osu-Christiansborg. He was Physician Specialist at Korle-Bu Hospital and Ridge Hospital, Accra, and Director of the erstwhile Ghana Institute of Clinical Genetics.

In 1972, he was National Foundation/March of Dimes Visiting Lecturer to 11 American Medical Schools, including Yale Medical School, George Washington University Medical School, Howard University College of Medicine, Cornell, Rockefeller, Indianapolis, Tennessee and Johns Hopkins.

He was Andrew N. Schofield Fellow, Christ's College, Cambridge (1970–71), and in 1976 he gave Edinburgh University's MacArthur Postgraduate Lecture. Konotey-Ahulu lectured in Turkey, Brazil, Greece, Singapore, Australia, India, Hungary, Canada, Denmark, Switzerland, Sweden (Stockholm) and, on the African continent, in Ghana, Nigeria, Cameroon, Ivory Coast, Sierra Leone, Liberia, Senegal, Kenya, Tanzania, Zambia, South Africa and Egypt. He did Grand Rounds at the NIH (Bethesda), George Washington University, Johns Hopkins, Howard University, Illinois and Chicago universities, and in Cook County Hospital, Chicago.

He was once editor of the Ghana Medical Journal, chairman of a Ghanaian Government Committee to Investigate Hospital Fees, member of the WHO Expert Committee Advisory Panel on Human Genetics, and a temporary consultant to the Commonwealth Secretariat's Medical Department in London. In March 1980, he was the University of Ghana Alumni Lecturer on the subject "Genes and Society, and Society and Genes". Konotey-Ahulu was invited by Professor Roland Scott as Annual Visiting Professor to Howard University College of Medicine, and as Honorary Consultant to its Centre for Sickle Cell Disease, Washingtonm DC.

== African health research ==
In March 1998, Konotey-Ahulu was appointed Chief Visiting Clinician/Scientist, Kenya Medical Research Institute (KEMRI), and was on the editorial board of the African Journal of Health Sciences of The African Forum of Health Sciences. Between 1965 and 2005 he published more than 200 articles, letters, editorials, book reviews, and comments. He had been round Sub-Saharan African countries studying AIDS, and published What is AIDS? (227 pages), The Sickle Cell Disease Patient (643 pages), and one booklet, Sickle Cell Disease – The Case For Family Planning (32 pages). Ghana's Managing Trustees of the VALCO Trust Fund supported much of his research. Konotey-Ahulu was a former examiner at the University of Ghana Medical School. In April 2000, he was appointed "Dr Kwegyir Aggrey Distinguished Professor of Human Genetics, University of Cape Coast, Ghana" after having been awarded an honorary DSc degree. His inaugural lecture was titled "Human Genetics and the Ghanaian African: How The New Genetics Affects You". In 2000, he was elected Fellow of the Third World Academy of Sciences.

In June 1973, he was invited to join The World Council of Churches' Consultation on Genetics and Quality of Life, chaired by Dr Robert Edwards, and more than 30 years later Konotey-Ahulu was still in contact with Bob Edwards through the Ethics Committee of the Cromwell Hospital, London, where Konotey-Ahulu was Consultant Physician from 1983 to July 2005. To present the African viewpoint in an international symposium on "The Human Genome Diversity Project", published by Politics and The Life Sciences (PLS), Lake Superior State University, USA, in September 1999 he titled his paper "The Human Genome Diversity Project: Cogitations of an African Native" (pages 317–322), where he traced the sickle-cell gene in his ancestry, with patients' names, generation by generation back to AD 1670, aided by the fact that the hereditary rheumatic syndrome was known to African tribes by specific onomatopoeic names (hemkom, chwechweechwe, nwiiwii, ahotutuo, nuidudui) for centuries before it was first described in the US in 1910.

This exercise in genetic genealogy, rare in medical archives, helped Konotey-Ahulu develop a discipline of genetic epidemiology to show how polygamy in his forebears produced gene combinations with variations in phenotypic expression of the hereditary syndrome. His invention of the Male Procreative Superiority Index (MPSI), which shed new light on African anthropogenetics, is the result of this personalised genetic epidemiology.

In October 2002, the South African Medical Research Council, with Georgetown University, Washington DC, invited him to take part in an international conference on "Developing Sustainable Health Care Delivery Systems in Africa for the New Millennium". He spoke on two topics: "An African Physician's Personal Analysis of his Continent's Sustainable Health Care Delivery Prognosis for the New Millennium", and "Setting Priorities and Overcoming Obstacles: AIDS in Africa – Obstacles to Health Care Delivery".

== Linguistics ==
Konotey-Ahulu developed a method for writing African tonal languages, explained in a book titled Mother Tongue – Introducing The Tadka Phonation Technique For Speaking An African Tonal Language: Krobo/Dangme-Ga of South-East Ghana (82 pages – ISBN 0-9515442-4-1. Watford, UK: T-A'D Co, 2001). The book aims to help educate some Africans to read their own language more easily and quickly than has hitherto been possible. It also explains the basic principles of Public Health information about genetic and acquired disease to those who do not read English, and promises to be a great tool in adult education, aiming to be translated into French and Portuguese.

== Christianity ==
Konotey-Ahulu was a Christian, played the piano, and wrote a Millennium Hymn of seven verses, complete with melody, entitled "Time Was Created", which the University of Cape Coast Choir sang after his inaugural address. He co-founded the Accra Chapel. He was a staunch biblical creationist, and ably defended Christianity in the Ghanaian Times and the British Medical Journal. His faith also meant that he was strongly anti-abortion, and denounced genetic testing for sickle-cell disease with a view to aborting babies with the disease. Most recently, he answered the latest antitheistic arguments from Richard Dawkins and the racist arguments from James Watson.

== Career and accomplishments ==
The value of Konotey-Ahulu's work as a global authority on sickle-cell disease, including some discoveries in Clinical Medicine, was widely recognized by medical practitioners and specialists around the world, leading to his inclusion in a survey of "The 100 Greatest Africans of All Time". He produced more than 200 publications, a number of which have become the definitive studies in their field.

Konotey-Ahulu was the first person known to have traced hereditary disease in his forebears, generation by generation, with all names, right back to 1670 AD. He was the recipient of numerous awards, including the Dr. Martin Luther King Jr. Foundation Award for outstanding research in Sickle Cell Anaemia, the Guinness Award for Scientific Achievement in the Commonwealth, and the Gold Medal of the Ghana Academy of Arts and Sciences for outstanding contribution to knowledge in the Medical Sciences by a Ghanaian.

== Personal life and death ==
Konotey-Ahulu was married to his English wife, Rosemary, for 63 years. They had three children: Dawid Konotey-Ahulu, Carys Brown and Lydia Campbell. Konotey-Ahulu had six sisters – Edna, Gritty, Ruby, Catherine, Ann, Helen – and a brother, David. Konotey-Ahulu also had 11 grandchildren and six great-grandchildren.

Konotey-Ahulu died in London on 28 May 2025, at the age of 94.

== Honours and awards ==
- Konotey-Ahulu was one of the recipients of the Dr Martin Luther King Jr. Foundation Award "for outstanding research in Sickle Cell Anaemia" (other recipients included Roland B Scott, Linus Pauling (Nobel Prize-winner), Herman Lehmann, Bela Ringelhann, James E. Bowman, Max Perutz (Nobel Prize-winner), J. V. Neel, Charles Whitten, and Graham Serjeant, in Philadelphia in 1972, when Konotey-Ahulu was chosen to give the keynote address).
- In 1974, Konotey-Ahulu was awarded the Gold Medal of the Ghana Academy of Arts and Sciences, of which he was a Fellow (FGA), for "the most outstanding contribution to knowledge in the Medical Sciences by a Ghanaian between 1952 and 1973".
- In 1976, in London he received the Guinness Award for Scientific Achievement (GASA) in the Commonwealth "in recognition of his work in applying science to the service of the community".
- In November 1999, he received from President Abdou Diouf of Senegal the 1998 Third World Academy of Sciences Award for outstanding work in the Basic Medical Sciences. The citation of this Trieste-based TWAS Award noted not only Konotey-Ahulu's "outstanding contributions to haemoglobinopathy" but also his "first description of some 5 new physical signs in Clinical Medicine, invention of the 'Male Procreative Superiority Index' (MPSI) which shed some light on aspects of African Anthropogenetics, and for his insistence on an ethical dimension to genetic programmes, and highlighting public health measures as the best tool for long-term sickle-cell patient management."

Reading in New African magazine (August/September 2004) that he had been voted among "The One Hundred Greatest Africans Of All Time", Konotey-Ahulu promptly pleaded in the October issue that he be replaced by Aggrey of Africa, whom Konotey-Ahulu proved by a 1,600-word article to be altogether more worthy of such honour.

In September 2005, Konotey-Ahulu gave five consecutive public lectures at the British Council Accra, on Contemporary Health Issues, in commemoration of the 115th anniversary of the Scripture Union in Ghana.
