= Elizabeth R. McAnarney =

- Born: May 7, 1940 (age 86); New York, New York
- Education: Vassar College (AB); State University of New York Upstate Medical University (MD)
- Awards: John Howland Award
- Scientific career
- Fields: Pediatrics, Adolescent Medicine
- Workplaces: University of Rochester

Elizabeth R. McAnarney (born May 7, 1940), often known as Lissa McAnarney, is a pediatrician who is recognized for her leadership in the fields of adolescent medicine and pediatrics. In 2013, she was awarded the John Howland Award, the most prestigious award given by the American Pediatric Society (APS).

== Early life and education ==
Elizabeth McAnarney was born in New York, New York on May 7, 1940. She grew up in Watkins Glen, New York. She graduated from Vassar College in 1962, received the M.D. cum laude from the State University of New York Upstate Medical University in 1966, and completed her pediatric residency there.

== Career ==
In 1968, she pursued post-residency fellowship training at the University of Rochester School of Medicine and Dentistry in Rochester, New York.

She has remained there to the present, serving as director of the Division of Adolescent Medicine for 22 years. In 1993, she became the first woman to serve as the university's chair of pediatrics, a position she held for 13 years; she also served as Acting Dean of the University of Rochester School of Medicine in 2009–2010. In 2018, she was named a Distinguished University Professor, the highest title that the university bestows on its faculty. McAnarney was the first woman to receive this honor at the University of Rochester.

McAnarney is a leader in the field of Adolescent Medicine, and long advocated for it to become a board-certified specialty, which it became in 1991. She is the editor of the Textbook of Adolescent Medicine, published in 1992.

She was the president of the Society for Adolescent Medicine (1983-1985, first woman president of the Association of Medical School Pediatric Department Chairs (AMSPDC) (2001-2003) and was president of the American Pediatric Society (2004-2005). She received the John Howland Award, the most prestigious award given by the American Pediatric Society (APS), in 2013.

Her scholarly activities focused on the relationship of young maternal age and perinatal outcome in high-risk adolescents. She has published extensively on this topic in many national journals.

== Awards and honors ==
McAnarney has been recognized for her community contributions to the city of Rochester on several occasions.

| Year | Award |
|---|---|
| 1989 | McNeill Outstanding Achievement in Adolescent Medicine |
| 1999 | Election as a fellow to the American Association for the Advancement of Science (AAAS) |
| 2000 | Election to the National Academy of Medicine (Institute of Medicine) |
| 2005 | Honorary Doctorate in Science, State University of New York Upstate Medical University, Syracuse, New York |
| 2013 | John Howland Award of the American Pediatric Society |
