= Jerold F. Lucey =

American pediatrician (1926–2017)

- Born: March 26, 1926; Holyoke, Massachusetts, United States
- Died: December 10, 2017 (aged 91); Osprey, Florida, United States
- Occupations: Pediatrician (neonatologist), editor-in-chief of Pediatrics
- Known for: Phototherapy for neonatal jaundice, use of neonatal pulmonary surfactants, transcutaneous oxygen monitoring
- Awards: John Howland Award (2009)

Jerold Francis Lucey (March 26, 1926 – December 10, 2017) was an American pediatrician and journal editor. He specialized in the field of neonatology, and introduced several therapies to mainstream use in the United States, including phototherapy for neonatal jaundice, transcutaneous oxygen monitoring, and pulmonary surfactant use.

== Life and education ==
Lucey was born in Holyoke, Massachusetts, in 1926. After graduating from Dartmouth College in 1948, having studied zoology, he completed a doctor of medicine at New York University College of Medicine in 1952.

== Career ==
He was an intern at Bellevue Hospital and a resident at Columbia-Presbyterian Medical Center, before completing a research fellowship focusing on jaundice in newborns at Boston Children's Hospital and Harvard Medical School. He moved to Vermont in 1956 to join the University of Vermont College of Medicine faculty, and was promoted to professor in 1967. He was named the Harry Wallace Professor of Neonatology in 1995 and remained in that role until his retirement in 2009.

Lucey was responsible for introducing phototherapy to the United States as a treatment for jaundice in newborns; although the technique had been invented earlier, Lucey conducted the first major trial to show that phototherapy was effective. He also led the first randomized controlled trial of pulmonary surfactant use in infant respiratory distress syndrome, leading to its widespread use in premature infants. Similarly, he promoted the use of transcutaneous oxygen saturation monitoring in newborns after seeing it used in Germany.

Lucey was editor-in-chief of the American Academy of Pediatrics' journal Pediatrics from 1974 until 2008. He received the John Howland Award, the highest honor of the American Pediatric Society, in 2009.

== Death ==
He died from a stroke on December 10, 2017, in Osprey, Florida.
