= Samuel Katz (pediatrician) =

American pediatrician and virologist (1927–2022)

- Born: Samuel Lawrence Katz; May 31, 1927; Manchester, New Hampshire, United States
- Died: August 31, 2022 (aged 95); Chapel Hill, North Carolina
- Education: Dartmouth College; Harvard Medical School
- Known for: Wilburt Cornell Davison Professor and Chairman of Pediatrics at Duke University
- Awards: John Howland Award (2000)

Samuel Lawrence Katz (May 29, 1927 – October 31, 2022) was an American pediatrician and virologist whose career has been devoted to infectious disease research, focusing principally on vaccine research and development. Katz was the Wilburt Cornell Davison Professor and Chairman of Pediatrics at Duke University.

== Early life and education ==
Born in Manchester, New Hampshire, he was an honors graduate of Dartmouth College and Harvard Medical School. After medical internship at Beth Israel Hospital he completed pediatrics residency training at the Massachusetts General Hospital and the Boston Children's Hospital, followed by a research fellowship in virology and infectious diseases.

== Career ==
Katz became a staff member at Children's Hospital working with Nobel Laureate John F. Enders. He remained with Enders for 12 years during which time they developed the attenuated measles vaccine now used throughout the world. In addition to his work on measles, Katz had been involved in studies of many other pathogens and infectious diseases including vaccinia, polio, rubella, influenza, pertussis, HIV, and Haemophilus influenzae b conjugates.

Katz chaired the Committee on Infectious Diseases of the American Academy of Pediatrics (the Redbook Committee), the Advisory Committee on Immunization Practices (ACIP) of the Centers for Disease Control, the Vaccine Priorities Study of the Institute of Medicine (IOM), and several WHO and CVI vaccine and HIV panels. He was a member of many scientific advisory committees and boards including the NIH, IOM, WHO, St. Jude Children's Research Hospital, The Burroughs Wellcome Fund (Chairman), and the Hasbro Children's Foundation. He was chairman of the Public Policy Council of the Infectious Diseases Society of America (IDSA) and co-chaired IDSA's Vaccine Initiative.

== Awards and honors ==
Katz was the 2003 winner of the Albert B. Sabin Gold Medal awarded by the Sabin Vaccine Institute for his contributions to vaccine discoveries during his career. In 2010 he was awarded the Maurice Hilleman/Merck Laureate by the American Society of Microbiology for major contributions to vaccine discovery and development. He received the John Howland Award, the most prestigious award bestowed by the American Pediatric Society, in 2000.

== Personal life ==
Katz died in Chapel Hill, North Carolina on October 31, 2022, at the age of 95.
