= Clement A. Smith =

American pediatrician (1901–1988)

Clement Andrew Smith (1901 – December 31, 1988) was an American pediatrician and the editor-in-chief of the journal Pediatrics. Though he did not consider himself to be a neonatologist, much of his work concerned the care of the newborn infant. He was associated with Harvard Medical School for several decades and served a term as president of the American Pediatric Society.

== Biography ==
Smith was born in Ann Arbor, Michigan. His father, Shirley Smith, had been a University of Michigan English professor and vice president. Smith attended the University of Michigan, where he earned a master's degree in English and a medical degree. He joined Boston Children's Hospital as a physician in 1931. With his colleagues at Harvard, Smith conducted research on the oxygen–hemoglobin dissociation curve in newborn babies to determine their oxygen requirements.

Smith was the editor-in-chief of the journal Pediatrics for more than a decade. He was the 1965-66 president of the American Pediatric Society. He received the society's highest honor, the John Howland Award, in 1976. The American Academy of Pediatrics (AAP) Section on Perinatal Pediatrics gave him its first Virginia Apgar Award in 1975, recognizing his work with newborns.

Smith was married to Margaret Earhart, who died in 1960. His second wife, Radcliffe College president Mary Bunting, survived him.
