= Pediatrics (journal) =

Monthly medical journal

- Discipline: Pediatrics
- Language: English, Spanish
- Edited by: Lewis R. First

Publication details
- History: 1948–present
- Publisher: American Academy of Pediatrics (United States)
- Frequency: Monthly
- Impact factor: 8.0 (2022)

Standard abbreviations
- ISO 4: Pediatrics

Indexing
- CODEN: PEDIAU
- ISSN: 0031-4005 (print); 1098-4275 (web)
- LCCN: 51002540
- OCLC no.: 1761995

Links
- Journal homepage; Online access; Online archive

Pediatrics is a monthly peer-reviewed medical journal published by the American Academy of Pediatrics. In the inaugural January 1948 issue, the journal's first editor-in-chief, Hugh McCulloch, articulated the journal's vision: "The content of the journal is... intended to encompass the needs of the whole child in his physiologic, mental, emotional, and social structure. The single word, Pediatrics, has been chosen to indicate this catholic intent." According to the Journal Citation Reports, the journal has a 2022 impact factor of 8.0.

== Editors ==
The following persons are or have been editor-in-chief:

- 1948–1954 Hugh McCulloch
- 1954–1961 Charles D. May
- 1962–1974 Clement A. Smith
- 1974–2009 Jerold F. Lucey
- 2009–2025 Lewis First
- 2025–present Alex R. Kemper
