= American Association for the Study and Prevention of Infant Mortality =

The American Association for the Study and Prevention of Infant Mortality (AASPIM) was one of the first organizations to begin investigating infant mortality rates in terms of eugenics. They promoted government intervention in attempts to promote the health of future citizens.

The AASPIM was founded at a November 1909 conference on the prevention of infant mortality, held in New Haven, Connecticut, by the American Association of Medicine (AAM). Its first annual meeting took place at Johns Hopkins University in November 1910. Subsequent meetings continued annually.

Luther Emmett Holt, in his 1913 presidential address to the AASPIM members, opposed the opinion that lowering infant mortality might help genetically unfit individuals to survive and thereby affect the nation's strength. In contrast, he held the position that

We must eliminate the unfit by birth not by death. The race is to be most effectively improved by preventing marriage and reproduction by the unfit, among whom we would class the diseased, the degenerate, the defective, and the criminal.

== See also ==
- Eugenics in the United States

== Bibliography ==
- Richard A. Meckel, Save the Babies: American Public Health Reform and the Prevention of Infant Mortality, 1850-1929, The Johns Hopkins University Press, 1990 ISBN 0801838797; Univ. of Michigan Press, 1998
