= Roland B. Scott =

American researcher and pediatrician (1909–2002)

Roland Boyd Scott
- Born: April 18, 1909; Houston, Texas, U.S.
- Died: December 10, 2002 (aged 93)
- Education: Howard University College of Medicine
- Occupations: Researcher, pediatrician, authority on sickle cell disease
- Medical career
- Institutions: Howard University

Roland Boyd Scott (April 18, 1909 – December 10, 2002) was an American researcher, pediatrician and authority on sickle cell disease. Scott authored a key paper in 1948 describing the incidence of sickle cell in infants that eventually led to the establishment of routine screening for newborns. He established the Howard University Center for Sickle Cell Disease. He was chairman of the pediatrics department at Howard University. He lobbied Congress to pass the Sickle Cell Anemia Control Act of 1971. He authored over 250 academic publications on allergy, growth and development, and sickle cell disease.

== Early life ==
Roland Boyd Scott was born on April 18, 1909, in Houston, Texas. Later his family moved to Kansas City, Missouri, where Scott completed high school in 1927. He chose to study at Howard University. He was also accepted at University of Chicago. His mother believed the predominantly African-American Howard would provide a more comfortable social environment for him. Scott studied chemistry and then began medical studies after completing his BS degree. Scott decided to focus on pediatrics, influenced by Alonzo DeGrate Smith, professor of pediatrics in the medical school. He conducted his earliest research into nutritional diseases, including a study of rickets and the use of vitamin D to treat it. Scott completed his study of medicine at Howard in 1934, graduating with an MD degree.

== Career ==
Scott completed his internship in Kansas City, Missouri. Despite limited interest at the time in the specialty, he decided to pursue residency in pediatrics and spent four years as a pediatric resident and fellow in Chicago at Provident Hospital, Cook County Hospital, and the Municipal Hospital for Contagious Diseases. Scott passed the examination of the American Board of Pediatrics in 1939. After completing his postgraduate training in pediatrics in Chicago, he returned to Howard to join the faculty. Scott was one of the first two black physicians in the United States to be admitted to membership in the American Academy of Pediatrics, after he was initially rejected because of race and had to reapply. Scott was the first black physician to become a member of the American Pediatric Society and the Society for Pediatric Research.

At that time an assistant professor of pediatrics at Howard University was paid $3,000 per year, leading Scott to negotiate for permission to work part-time as a pediatric consultant. During this part-time work at Freedmen's Hospital, he saw that most parents of children admitted with sickle cell anemia lacked awareness of the disease. He saw many children die from its complications and in 1948 he began writing about the condition. Scott published articles describing the clinical findings of sickle cell disease in infants and children. Working with a team from his clinic, he prepared exhibits on the disease that were presented at medical meetings throughout the USA and overseas. In 1948 Scott published a report on the incidence of red cell sickling in newborn infants which helped to change the modern understanding of the disease and would eventually lead to newborn screening tests that became standard of care. Initially, the disease was seen as affecting only African-Americans, bringing little financial support available for studying it. Scott showed that the disease also occurs in the Mediterranean, South America and the Middle-East, and in people from those regions. In 1945, Scott was appointed acting director of pediatrics. In 1949, Scott was instrumental in turning the pediatric division into a department from the Department of Medicine, of which he became Chairman. He remained as head of pediatrics for twenty-eight years.

In 1950, Scott took a sabbatical to study allergic diseases at Roosevelt Hospital in New York City. Upon his return to Howard, he started allergy clinics for children at D.C. General and Freedmen's Hospitals. Scott became board certified in both allergy and clinical immunology. In 1971, Scott and others lobbied Congress, which then passed the Sickle Cell Control Act. Following the act, increasing funding was made available from the National Institutes of Health (NIH) for studying and treating sickle cell disease. Soon after, a grant was awarded to establish the Howard University Center for Sickle Cell Disease, as one of ten centers created to ensure more productive research and more effective clinical treatment for patients. Scott directed the Howard University Center for Sickle Cell Disease from its creation in 1971 until his retirement in 1990.

Scott authored or co-authored more than 250 scientific publications. He was interviewed by Carl Pochedly of the American Journal of Pediatric Hematology/Oncology, and mentioned coping with racism in the United States as a significant and lifelong problem.

== Personal life ==
In 1935, he married Sarah Rosetta Weaver. They had three children. Scott died on December 10, 2002, at the age of 93 of congestive heart failure at the Washington Adventist Hospital in Washington, D.C.

== Awards ==
- American Academy of Pediatrics’ Jacobi Award
- Pioneer in sickle cell research award from the Advisory Board of the Comprehensive Center for Sickle Cell Disease of the Columbia University College of Physicians and Surgeons
- Special award from the National Sickle Cell Disease Program for "leadership and pioneering efforts in directing national and international attention to sickle cell disease."
