= Catherine Wilfert =

American pediatrician (1936–2020)

- Born: July 26, 1936; Inglewood, California
- Died: 13 September 2020 (aged 84)
- Education: Harvard Medical School (MD)
- Occupation: physician
- Known for: ACTG 076 study of AZT reducing mother-to-child transmission of HIV
- Medical career
- Institutions: Duke University School of Medicine
- Sub-specialties: infectious diseases
- Research: pediatric HIV disease

Catherine Wilfert (26 July 1936 - 13 September 2020) was an American pediatrician specializing in infectious diseases. She became a professor at Duke University School of Medicine and known internationally for her work in pediatric HIV prevention. After 1993, using zidovudine during pregnancy led to an estimated reduction of mother-to-infant transmission of HIV in the United States by 75 percent and a 47 percent decrease in new HIV infections globally.

== Early life and education ==
Catherine Wilfert was born in Inglewood, California. She studied at Stanford University. She recalled that one of her professors told her not to bother applying to Harvard Medical School. In 1958, she graduated from Harvard Medical School as one of only five women in her class. She did her pediatric residency at Boston City Hospital, in the early 1960s and interned under John Enders. whom she called her "most influential teacher".

== Career ==
In 1969, Wilfert became a pediatric faculty member at the Duke University School of Medicine. Her research was in virology and epidemiology of Rocky Mountain Spotted Fever. In 1976, she became the division chief of Pediatric Infectious Diseases.

Years into the AIDS epidemic there had not been any medication to treat HIV infection, but when zidovudine was approved, "Wilfert theorized that by reducing the viral load of infected mothers, she could diminish the amount of virus their babies were exposed to, thereby reducing HIV transmission from mother to baby." In April 1991 the Pediatric AIDS Clinical Trials Group (ACTG) of the US NIAID and the National Institute of Health and Medical Research (INSERM) and the National Agency of Research on AIDS (ANRS), France started the clinical trial of zidovudine (AZT) in HIV-infected pregnant women otherwise known as "ACTG protocol 076". The trial showed such a big reduction in the risk for HIV transmission to infants, that it was halted prematurely in 1993 and later became the new standard of care, leading to an estimated reduction of mother-to-infant transmission of HIV in the United States by 75 percent.

In 1996, she retired from Duke University and became scientific director of the Elizabeth Glaser Pediatric AIDS Foundation to prevent mother-to-child transmission of HIV in low-income countries Thailand, South Africa, Kenya, Cameroon, and Uganda. The "Call To Action" led to a 47 percent decrease in new HIV infections globally. She retired from this position in 2010.

== Personal life ==
In 1971 Wilfert married Samuel Katz (pediatrician). She had two children and six step children. She was an "avid gardener, seamstress, photographer and admirer of visual artists, her favorite being Georgia O'Keeffe."
