= Morgan Stanley Children's Hospital =

- Columbia University Irving Medical Center; NewYork-Presbyterian Hospital

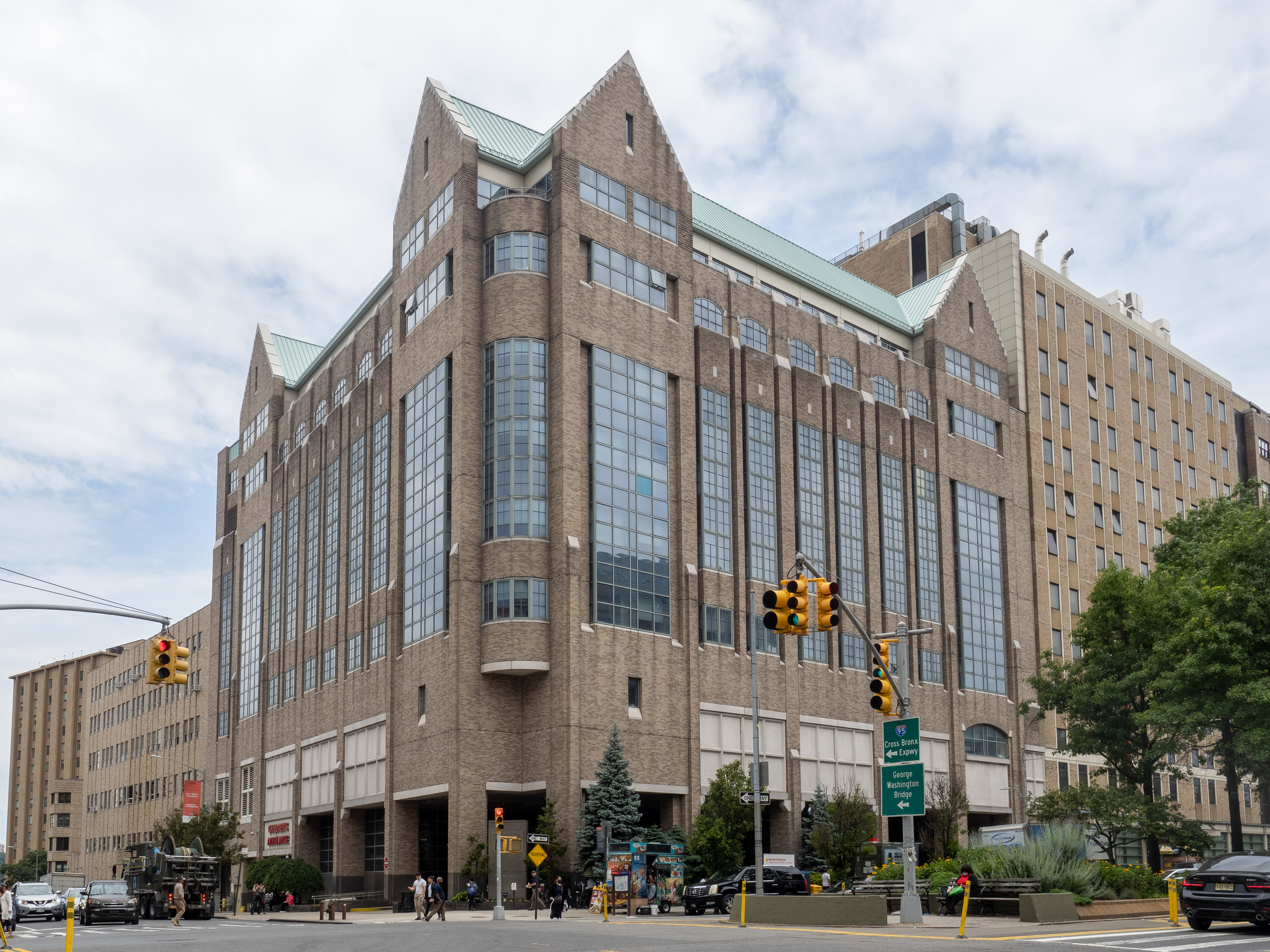
- The front of the hospital pictured in 2021

Geography
- Location: Manhattan, New York, United States
- Coordinates: 40°50′23″N 73°56′28″W

Organization
- Type: Teaching
- Affiliated university: Columbia University Vagelos College of Physicians and Surgeons

Services
- Emergency department: Level I Pediatric Trauma Center
- Beds: 299
- Speciality: Children's hospital

History
- Former names: (1887–1980) Babies Hospital; (1980–2003) Babies and Children's Hospital; (2003–present) Morgan Stanley Children's Hospital
- Opened: 1887 (Babies' Hospital); 2003 (current building)

Links
- Website: nyp.org/morganstanley
- Lists: Hospitals in New York State
- Other links: Hospitals in Manhattan

Morgan Stanley Children's Hospital of NewYork-Presbyterian (MSCH or CHONY) is a women's and children's hospital at 3959 Broadway, near West 165th Street, in the Washington Heights neighborhood of Manhattan, New York City. It is a part of NewYork-Presbyterian Hospital and the Columbia University Irving Medical Center. The hospital treats patients aged 0–21 from New York City and around the world. The hospital features a ACS verified Level I Pediatric Trauma Center and is named after financial firm Morgan Stanley, which largely funded its construction through philanthropy.

The hospital is affiliated with the Columbia University Vagelos College of Physicians and Surgeons, and many of its physicians are faculty members of the college.

== History ==
The hospital has nearly 250 years of history in treating children, tracing its roots to the establishment of Columbia University's – then King's College – Department of Pediatrics in 1767. Initially founded as Babies Hospital, it was established in 1887 in a Brownstone on 55th Street and Lexington Avenue. At the time of its opening, New York City's hospitals only had 27 beds catering to infants.

In 1929, the hospital moved from its Lexington Avenue site to Upper Manhattan to become part of the Columbia–Presbyterian Medical Center. The hospital underwent various expansions throughout the years and, during the planning of the new building, the old hospital had 168 beds and six operating rooms.

=== The Babies Hospital ===
The Babies Hospital, which was New York City's first dedicated hospital for children, was founded in 1887 by Drs. Sarah McNutt and Julia McNutt and three members of the board of New York Infirmary, Jeannie Smith, Isabella Satterthwaite, and Isabella Banks.

Since its founding, Babies Hospital physicians have helped shape the field of modern pediatrics and established numerous medical subspecialties.

=== 1887–1900 ===
The hospital, which initially had only women resident physicians, had 30 beds for sick infants and children up to three years old; malnutrition was the most common diagnosis. Its early leaders focused on milk sterilization, proper nutrition, and sanitary practices.

In 1887, L. Emmett Holt was appointed medical director. Under his leadership, Babies Hospital became the leading pediatric hospital of its time.

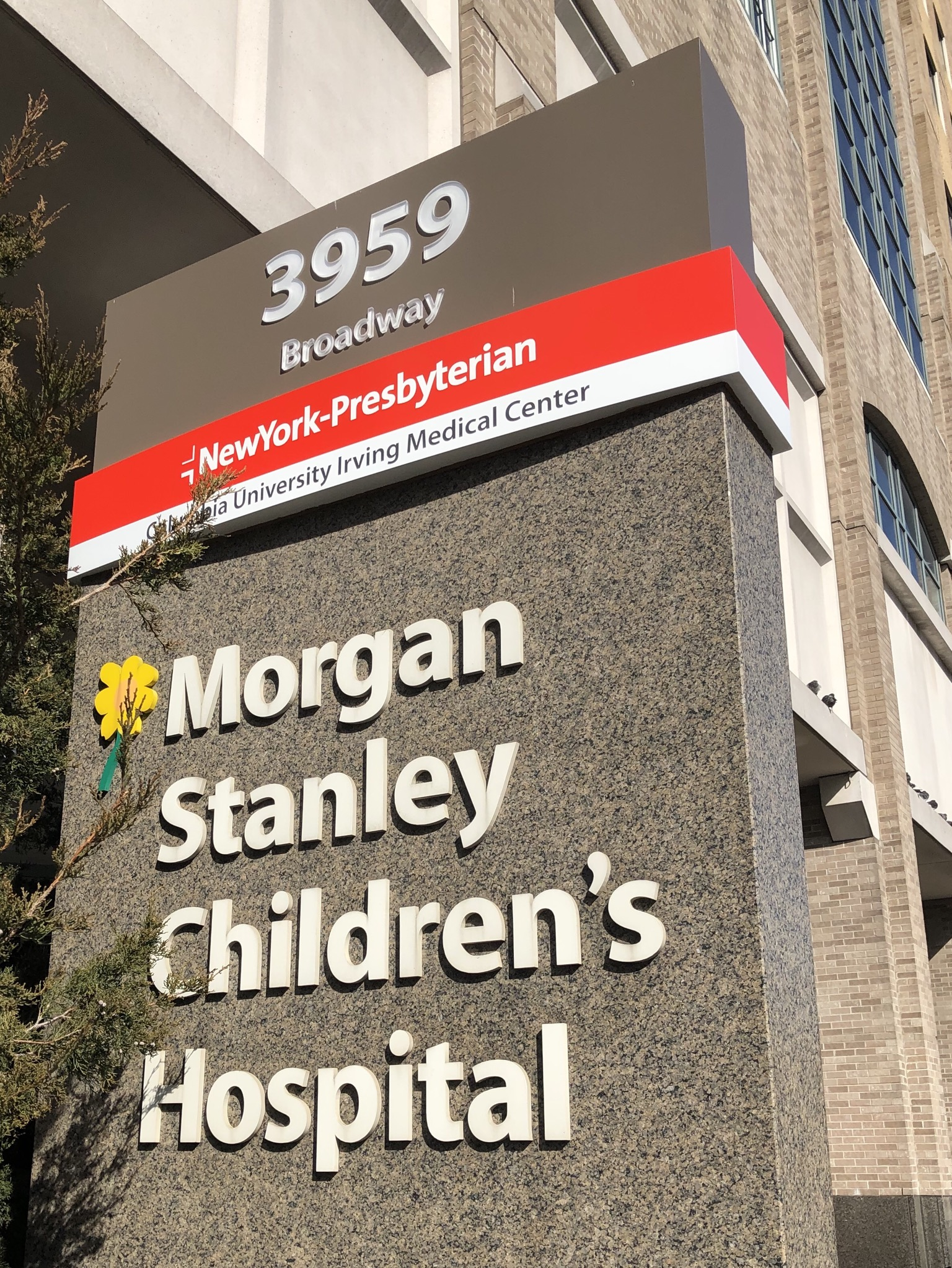
Signage outside NYP/MSCH

Martha Wollstein, MD, the first fully specialized pediatric perinatal pathologist practicing exclusively in a North American children's hospital, became the pathologist of record at Babies Hospital as of 1892.

Babies Hospital was also the first hospital to use neonatal incubators in the U.S.

=== 1900–1929 ===
In 1900, Babies Hospital affiliated with the Columbia University College of Physicians and Surgeons to help train new doctors in pediatrics. In 1900, the Rockefeller family helped to fund the construction of a new Babies Hospital at its original site. That 10-story building still stands today as Children's Hospital North.

In 1903, Dorothy Reed Mendenhall, one of the first female physicians who discovered the blood cell disorder characteristic of Hodgkin's disease, completed an internship in pediatrics at Babies Hospital.

In 1922, Babies Hospital physicians established the first pediatric radiology service.

Babies Hospital retained an independent corporate identity until it was wholly merged into Presbyterian Hospital on Dec. 31, 1943.

The new facility in northern Manhattan had 204 beds for children up to 12 years of age. The New York Times referred to the new Babies Hospital as "the last word in hospital design and equipment," mainly because of revolutionary features such as private and shared patient rooms, playrooms, and a roof garden.

=== 1930–1991 ===
From 1930 to 1960, Rustin McIntosh, MD, was chief of pediatrics at Babies Hospital. Under his leadership, the hospital was one of the first in the country to develop programs in neonatal care, pediatric surgery, radiology, neurology, hematology-oncology, and psychiatry. As the director of pediatrics at the Columbia University College of Physicians and Surgeons, he assembled a department of noted pediatric subspecialists. These included Dorothy Hansine Andersen (pathology), Hattie Alexander (infectious disease), William Silverman (neonatology), John Caffey (radiology), and James Wolff (Hematology-Oncology).

In 1933, Hattie Elizabeth Alexander, MD, was appointed as an adjunct assistant pediatrician at Babies Hospital. During her tenure at the hospital, she developed a cure for influenza meningitis, which reduced the mortality rate to 20 percent in children and infants. Dr. Alexander was also the first woman elected president of the American Pediatric Society.

In 1936, Donovan McCune, an attending physician at Babies Hospital, first described a rare genetic disorder later known as McCune–Albright syndrome. In 1940, Katharine Krom Merritt and Haig Haigouni Kasabach, pediatricians at Babies Hospital, first described a case of Kasabach-Merritt syndrome in an infant. In 1949, Conrad M. Riley and Richard Lawrence Day identified Riley-Day syndrome, a nervous system disorder affecting children of Eastern European Jewish descent mostly.

In 1953, Babies Hospital anesthesiologist Virginia Apgar, MD, created an easy scoring method for predicting infant health, now known as the "Apgar score." The Apgar score measures five body functions to determine the need for life-saving assistance within a minute of birth and remains the international pediatric standard for assessing newborn health. James Wolff, MD, was a founding member of the Children's Cancer Group, the first cooperative cancer treatment consortium in the United States, and also collaborated with Dr. Vincent Freda to discover the therapy for Rh disease.

In 1959, Baby's hospital physicians developed the sweat test.

In 1968, the hospital once again expanded and erected a new adjacent building. The new building doubled the size of the hospital and is now known as the "Central Building" of MSCH.

Shaken Baby syndrome was described in 1972. In 1984, Dr. Eric Rose performed the first successful pediatric heart transplant at Babies Hospital.

=== 1992–present ===
In the early 1990s, the hospital performed a renovation of its pediatric intensive care unit. The renovation was funded by Morgan Stanley.

Dr. Driscoll, a neonatologist, had directed the neonatal intensive care unit since 1971. In 1992, Driscoll was named chairman and remained chair until he retired in 2007.

In 2000, investment bank Morgan Stanley Dean Witter gifted NewYork-Presbyterian more than $55 million to build the Morgan Stanley Dean Witter Children's Hospital at 165th Street and Broadway adding on to the Babies and Children's Hospital.

In 2003, the Morgan Stanley Children's Hospital of NewYork-Presbyterian opened.

In 2009, MSCH made national news when they were able to remove and replace six organs and cut out a tumor in 7-year-old Heather McNamara. The surgery took 23 hours.

In 2013, the hospital installed a new pirate-themed CT scanner. It was installed by GE and designed to reduce the fear and anxiety of children getting a CT scan at the hospital.

== About ==
In 2020, NewYork-Presbyterian was the top-ranked children's hospital in the New York metro area in the 2020-2021 rankings by U.S. News & World Report's "Best Children's Hospitals". In 2019, the hospital was ranked in all ten pediatric specialties.

NewYork-Presbyterian Morgan Stanley Children's Hospital was named a Level 1 Children's Surgery Center by the American College of Surgeons in 2019. NewYork-Presbyterian Morgan Stanley Children's Hospital is a New York State-designated Regional Perinatal Center, a Level IV Neonatal Intensive Care Unit, and a Level 1 Pediatric Trauma Center.

NewYork-Presbyterian Morgan Stanley Children's Hospital has 269 beds - including 100 medical/surgical beds, 41 pediatric intensive care beds (including 14 cardiac intensive care beds), and 50 neonatal intensive care beds.

=== Services ===
- Pediatric ECMO: NewYork-Presbyterian Morgan Stanley Children's Hospital's pediatric ECMO (Extracorporeal Membrane Oxygenation, which provides heart-lung support) program is one of five programs in the world designated as a Platinum Center of Excellence by the Extracorporeal Life Support Organization (ELSO) for Excellence in Life Support. The ECMO program is provided in either the Neonatal Intensive Care Unit (NICU) or the Pediatric Intensive Care Unit (PICU).
- SCID Specialty Care Center: NewYork-Presbyterian Morgan Stanley Children's Hospital is one of a few New York State–designated Severe Combined Immunodeficiency (SCID) Specialty Care Centers. A specialty care center is a healthcare facility established to provide treatment and services to children identified by the newborn screening laboratory.
- Center for Autism and the Developing Brain: The Center for Autism and the Developing Brain, located at NewYork-Presbyterian Westchester Behavioral Health Center provides services to patients and families affected by autism. The 11,000-square-foot center was created with $11 million in donations from New York Collaborates for Autism, Jim and Marilyn Simons, Autism Speaks, and the Mortimer D. Sackler Foundation.
- Weinberg Family Cerebral Palsy Center: In 2013, Debby and Peter A. Weinberg donated more than $7 million to help establish the Weinberg Family Cerebral Palsy Center. The center provides patient education and helps patients transition from pediatric to adult care when they turn 21.

=== Research ===
Pediatric research at NewYork-Presbyterian Morgan Stanley Children's Hospital is conducted through the Department of Pediatrics at Columbia University Vagelos College of Physicians & Surgeons. The Department of Pediatrics has received more National Institutes of Health research grants than any other pediatric program in the New York metro area.

The physician-researchers at the hospital have made significant advancements in the field of pediatrics, including performing the first successful pediatric heart transplant, identification of cystic fibrosis, and the creation of the Apgar score. NewYork-Presbyterian Morgan Stanley Children's Hospital is a member of the Food Allergy Research & Education (FARE) Clinical Network to aid in the development of new therapeutics and best practices for the care of patients with food allergies. The FARE Clinical Network consists of 33 Centers of Excellence that develop best practices for the care of patients with food allergies; serve as sites for clinical research; contribute to the development of the FARE Patient Registry and food allergy biorepositories to support food allergy research.

== Sloane Hospital for Women ==
The Sloane Hospital for Women is the obstetrics and gynecology service within NewYork-Presbyterian Hospital and the Department of Obstetrics and Gynecology of the Columbia University College of Physicians and Surgeons (P&S) in New York City. It was originally founded in 1886 with Columbia P&S as a training and treatment center for obstetrics. It has now provided over 100 years of obstetrical care. The hospital is located within Morgan Stanley Children's Hospital.

== Rankings ==
As of 2025 Morgan Stanley Children's Hospital and Komansky Children's Hospital have tied as the #1 children's hospital in New York and placed nationally in 10 ranked pediatric specialties by U.S. News & World Report.

U.S. News & World Report rankings for MSCH and KCH
Specialty	Rank (in the U.S.)
Neonatology	#15
Pediatric & Adolescent Behavioral Health	Top 50
Pediatric Cardiology & Heart Surgery	#24
Pediatric Diabetes & Endocrinology	#15
Pediatric Gastroenterology & GI Surgery	#18
Pediatric Nephrology	#46
Pediatric Neurology & Neurosurgery	#20
Pediatric Orthopedics	#32
Pediatric Pulmonology & Lung Surgery	#34
Pediatric Urology	#46

== In popular culture ==
- Morgan Stanley Children's Hospital was featured in Season 2 Episode 2 of NY Med. 19-year-old Chris Molnar from South Brunswick need a heart transplant to replace his LVAD and received one at Morgan Stanley Children's Hospital. Molnar was originally brought to Bristol Myers Squibb Children's Hospital at RWJ but was transferred to MSCH when the hospital could not manage his complex heart condition.
- Morgan Stanley Children's Hospital was featured in Season 1 Episode 2 of the Netflix series Diagnosis. 7-year-old Sadie Gonzalez from Queens, NY is faced with a brain disorder that causes her to have constant seizures. After preliminary treatments at MSCH failed, Sadie went to neurologists at nearby Kravis Children's Hospital for treatment.

== See also ==
- Sarah McNutt
- Columbia University Irving Medical Center
- Cohen Children's Medical Center
