= Society for Pediatric Research =

US child health organization

- Website: www.societyforpediatricresearch.org

The Society for Pediatric Research (SPR) is an international society of multidisciplinary pediatric researchers. The Society works with four independent regional societies: Eastern, Midwestern, Southern, and Western Societies for Pediatric Research. The Society for Pediatric Research is a collaborative partner with the American Pediatric Society.

== See also ==
- American Academy of Pediatrics
- American College of Pediatricians
- Academic Pediatric Association
- American Pediatric Society
