= Edwards A. Park (doctor) =

American pediatrician

- Born: December 30, 1877; Gloversville, New York
- Died: July 11, 1969 (aged 91); Nova Scotia, Canada
- Education: Yale University; Columbia University
- Occupations: Pediatrician, researcher
- Years active: 1905-47
- Known for: Rickets, lead poisoning
- Spouse: Agnes Bevan (1913-66)
- Awards: John Howland Award

Edwards A. Park (December 30, 1877 – July 11, 1969) was an American pediatrician who established the pediatric heart disease clinic at the Johns Hopkins Hospital, along with other pediatric subspecialties. Park was chief of Pediatrics at the Harriet Lane Home for two decades, and published articles on medical conditions such as rickets and lead poisoning.

The contemporary pediatric department at Hopkins is still regulated in the same way that Park established. The Edwards A. Park Scholarship Fund at Johns Hopkins was built under his name upon his eightieth birthday by friends, colleagues and former students.

== Early life ==
Park was born in Gloversville, New York, on December 30, 1877. His father was a local Congregational minister.

Park attended Yale University and earned his B.A. degree in 1900. After his graduation, Park declined to follow his father into a religious occupation. He instead debated between a career in medicine and one in teaching Greek. He eventually decided to pursue medicine shortly after graduating from Yale University.

Park received his M.D. degree from the Columbia University College of Physicians and Surgeons in 1905. He was an intern at the Roosevelt Hospital in New York from 1905 to 1907. He spent the next two years as an intern at the New York Foundling Hospital, working for six months in pediatrics, where Dr. John Howland was an attending physician. Park also spent several months at the City Hospital on Blackwell Island, where he cultivated pathological skills and insight crucial to his later research in rickets.

== Career ==
=== Early career ===
After completing varying internships, Park began his career at a private practice from 1909 to 1912, where he worked for Theodore Caldwell Janeway as an office assistant. WithJaneway, Park published his first paper in 1910, focused on the contractions of arteries, which they had studied in vitro. In 1912, Park wrote his first pediatrics paper while studying pathology at Roosevelt Island. During that summer, he also went to Marburg, Germany, to study under Schmidt, the world's leading expert in rickets at the time. While abroad, Park was offered a position by Howland to join his first pediatric staff at Johns Hopkins Hospital. Although Park initially declined because he was working with Janeway and felt obliged to stay in the position, he later joined the small staff in an effort of creating a new full-time department of Pediatrics at Johns Hopkins.

=== World War I ===
When World War I broke out in 1914, the American Red Cross sent Park to Le Havre, France, to run an orphanage for Belgian children. With a limited staff of only three doctors, a nurse, and an executive secretary, he established a clinic and a small hospital in the local neighborhood. He witnessed first-hand the effects of poverty and malnutrition on disease. This experience affected his decision to hire Ruth Wendell Washburn in the summer of 1918 and build a department of social service.

=== Johns Hopkins ===
In 1919, Park returned to Baltimore, Maryland. Following his research with Howland, he went to Yale where he took on the role as the professor of Pediatrics for seven years. In 1927, Howland's death caused Park to return to Johns Hopkins to take over as professor of Pediatrics and chief of Pediatrics. In 1946, Park was also named the professor emeritus of Pediatrics at the School of Medicine. As chief of Pediatrics of the Johns Hopkins Hospital, he established multiple specialty clinics under pediatrics, with tuberculosis, cardiac, endocrine, and psychiatric clinics, bringing fame to the Harriet Lane Home. He was known for his daily noon conferences with his staff, during which an intern, resident, and sub-specialist would all review a case. After they presented, Park would question all parts, reviewing all steps and small details. One student described his questions as being "asked softly, hesitantly, almost apologetically, but each one was apropos, pointed and searching". His attention to detail also applied to all publications that came from the Harriet Lane Home, as Park wrote about 30 papers over his twenty years as chief of Pediatrics and reviewed over 100 papers written by his staff.

==== The Harriet Lane Home ====
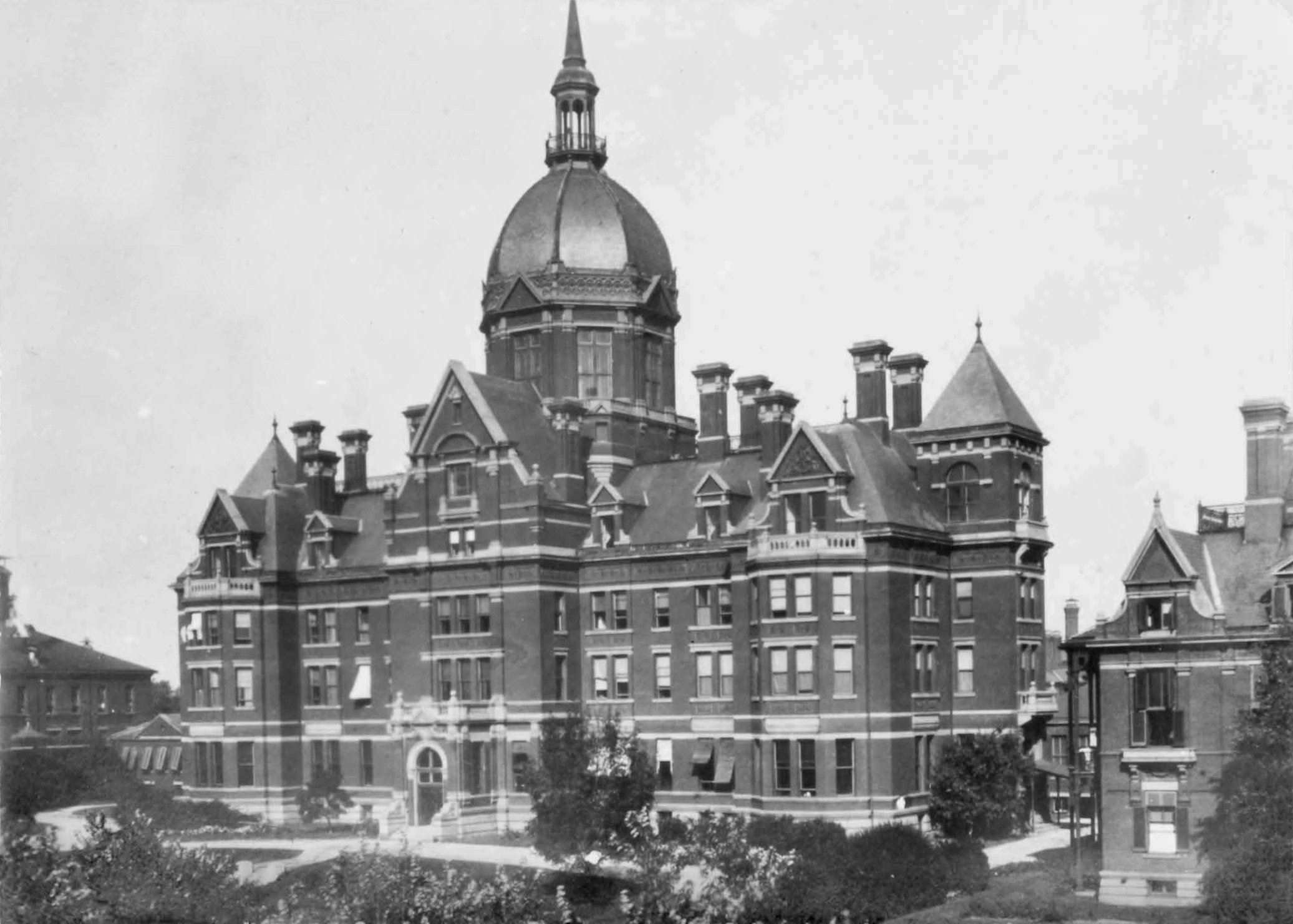
Park spent half of his life working at the Johns Hopkins Hospital in Baltimore, Maryland.

When Howland died in 1926, Park was inaugurated as the new professor of Pediatrics who would oversee the operations of the Harriet Lane Home. Thus, he became the successor of Howland, and the third director of the Harriet Lane Home in the two decades to follow (1926–1947). Six months after settling into his new position, Park realized that children in the Baltimore dispensaries were receiving significantly lower quality care compared to children who could afford to be treated at the hospital. Frustrated at this social phenomenon, Park went to Dr. Edward Carter, who was then a cardiologist in the Department of Medicine. He asked Carter whether he would support the establishment of a pediatric clinic. On December 1, 1927, Park collaborated with the Rockefeller Institute and the Commonwealth Fund to set up a pediatric heart disease clinic at Johns Hopkins in the outpatient dispensary.

Before Park's arrival, the Harriet Lane Home was an obscure clinic where pediatrics was viewed as a specialty that held very little status. Although the full-time system had recently begun to flourish in the United States, it was difficult for most hospitals and clinics to adhere entirely to its principles. Under Howland, the university started to pour intellectual and financial investments into a full-time pediatric system, but Park ultimately played the transitional role in ensuring the permanence of the system. Park invoked concerns about access to and cost of pediatric health care, and advocated for a central focus surrounding a few particular diseases.

== Research ==
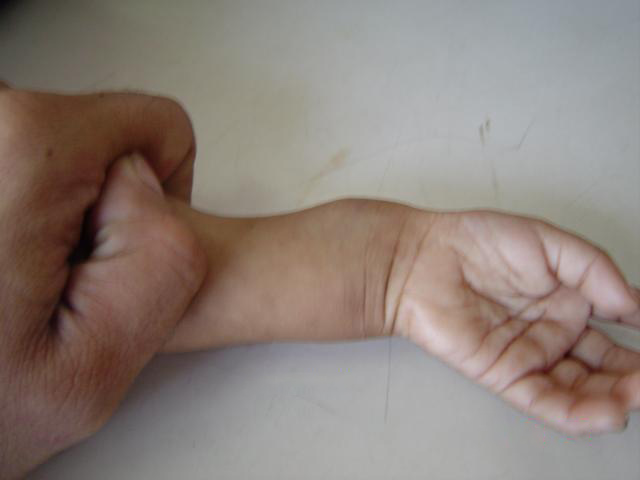
An abnormal bone growth in a child's wrist due to rickets

Although Park's initial research interests revolved around cardiovascular physiology and cardiac disease, his research later made the most impact in the field of rickets and the growth in bone that indicate the illness.

During Park's time, rickets had been viewed as an enduring and often permanently damaging disease that was especially prominent in the case of infants. Before his arrival at Johns Hopkins, Howland and Dr. E.V. McCollum had already begun work on studying rickets – specifically studying the changes in calcium and potassium content of the blood. Park taught and worked in the Hunterian Lab, where he studied histologic changes in the bone, characterizing normal versus abnormal changes in bone growth. He did so by varying dietary deficiencies, and discovered that vitamin D can be used to prevent rickets. This work, along with that of E.V. McCollum, Simmonds and Shipley, led to a total of 23 publications over a fifteen-month period.

Park's other research interests were reflected in his study of bone structure where growth has been malignantly halted by illness. Through X-ray examinations, he discovered that bone growth proceeds horizontally so that a dense horizontal line of bone builds up during a disease phase, despite the cartilage arrest. Park received the Goldberger Award for this study at the age of 85, and he included his findings through years of bone growth research in the publication of his last paper in 1964.

== Personal life and family ==
While working at the Johns Hopkins Hospital, Park lived in Garrison, Maryland, with his wife, Agnes Bevan, an English woman he had met in London in 1911. Together, they had three children.

Referred to as "Ned" by his friends and colleagues, Park was known for having people over to his home and summer home in Cape Breton, Nova Scotia. There, Park continued his research and fished for salmon, designing the "Park fly" to better catch them. At his summer home on the Margaree River, Park died in 1969, and was later buried there.

== Awards and honorary degrees ==
- M.A. from Yale University (1923)
- Doctorate of Science from the University of Rochester (1936)
- Doctorate of Science from Washington University in St. Louis (1950)
- Association of American Physicians - George M. Kober Medal (1950) an award given annually to a member who makes significant contributions to their respective field
- Doctorate of Law from Johns Hopkins University (1951)
- American Pediatric Society - inaugural John Howland Award (1952) an award given annually for "distinguished service to pediatrics as a whole."
- New York Academy of Medicine - Bronze Medal (1953)
- Doctorate of Science from Laval University (1955)
- American Medical Association - Goldberg Nutrition Award (1964)
