= American Pediatric Society =

The American Pediatric Society (APS) is the first pediatric society established in North America. Created in 1887, the APS pursues a vision of an engaged, inclusive, and impactful community of pediatric thought leaders. The APS focuses on academic pediatrics and engagement in child health.

== Awards and honors ==
- The John Howland Award, considered the highest honor given by APS, has been awarded since 1952 to honor those who, by their contribution to pediatrics, have aided in its advancement.

== See also ==
- American Academy of Pediatrics
- Academic Pediatric Association
- Society for Pediatric Research
