= Mazra =

Mazra may refer to:

- Mazra, Armenia (disambiguation)

- Katnarrat, Syunik, Armenia
- Mets Masrik, Armenia
- Mutsk, Armenia
- Pokr Masrik, Armenia

- Mazra, Azerbaijan (disambiguation)

- Məzrə, Babek, Azerbaijan
- Məzrə, Jabrayil, Azerbaijan
- Məzrə, Ordubad, Azerbaijan
- Məzrə, Qubadli, Azerbaijan
- Mazrali, Azerbaijan

- Mazra, Iran (disambiguation)

- Mazra, Ahar, East Azerbaijan Province, Iran
- Mazra, Shabestar, East Azerbaijan Province, Iran
- Mazra, Varzaqan, East Azerbaijan Province, Iran
- Mazra, Hamadan, Iran
- Mazra, Markazi, Iran

- Mazra'a, Israel
- Mazra, Turkey, a historical Assyrian hamlet in the village of Tkhuma
