= Migeon =

Migeon may refer to:

== People with the surname ==
- Armand Viellard-Migeon (1842-1905), French politician.
- Barbara Migeon (born 1931), American geneticist.
- Claude Migeon (1923-2018), French-born American pediatric endocrinologist.
- François Viellard-Migeon (1803-1886), French politician.
- Jean-Baptiste Migeon (1768-1845), French businessman and politician.
- Jules Migeon (1815-1868), French author and politician.

== Place ==
- Migeon Avenue Historic District, historic district in Connecticut, USA.
