= Masrik =

Masrik may refer to:

- Mets Masrik, a town in the Gegharkunik province of Armenia
- Pokr Masrik, a town in the Gegharkunik Province of Armenia
