= Mezire =

Mezire may refer to:

- Məzirə, Azerbaijan
- Méziré, France
