= Mazra, Armenia =

Mazra, Armenia may refer to:

- Katnarrat, Syunik
- Mets Masrik
- Mutsk
- Pokr Masrik
