= Melvin M. Grumbach =

American pediatric endocrinologist (1925–2016)

- Born: December 21, 1925; New York City, New York, U.S.
- Died: October 4, 2016 (aged 90); San Francisco, California, U.S.
- Scientific career
- Fields: Pediatric endocrinology
- Workplaces: University of California, San Francisco

Melvin Malcolm Grumbach (December 21, 1925 – October 4, 2016) was an American pediatrician and academic who specialized in pediatric endocrinology. Called Edward B. Shaw Distinguished Professor of Pediatrics, Emeritus at the University of California, San Francisco School of Medicine, Grumbach was noted for his research and writing on the effect of hormones and the central nervous system on growth and puberty and their disorders; the function of the human sex chromosomes; and disorders of sexual development.

== Career ==
After graduating from New Utrecht High School in Brooklyn, New York, and then attending Columbia College in New York City, Grumbach went on to earn his medical degree from the College of Physicians and Surgeons, Columbia University, in 1948. He completed his internship at Mount Sinai Hospital in 1949 and his residency at Babies Hospital, Columbia Presbyterian Medical Center in pediatrics under the direction of Rustin McIntosh in 1951. During the Korean War he served as a captain in the United States Air Force Medical Corps, with assignments at Oak Ridge Institute of Nuclear Studies in Tennessee and at Fort Detrick Biological Laboratories in Maryland. Following his military service, Grumbach did a fellowship with Lawson Wilkins at Johns Hopkins. He then returned to Babies Hospital and Columbia University in 1955, becoming founding director of the Pediatric Endocrine Division at Babies Hospital. In 1966 Grumbach was recruited to the University of California San Francisco as chairman of the Department of Pediatrics, and in 1983 he was named the first Edward B. Shaw Distinguished Professor of Pediatrics. Grumbach served as chairman of the Department of Pediatrics at University of California San Francisco for over two decades, transforming the department into one of the leading academic centers for pediatrics in the country. Grumbach stepped down as chairman of pediatrics in 1986 and retired in 1994, but he remained active in the field until December 2014.

Grumbach made many seminal contributions the understanding of pediatric endocrinology including extensive studies on the development and function of the endocrine and neuroendocrine systems from fetal life through puberty, as well as studies of the hormonal and genetic effects on growth, bone maturation, puberty, sex determination and differentiation (and their disorders) and disease-causing pathology. He was a past president of the Endocrine Society, the American Pediatric Society, the Lawson Wilkins Pediatric Endocrine Society, the Association of Medical School Pediatric Department Chairmen, and honorary president of the International Endocrine Society. From 1956 to 1990 he supervised the training of 82 fellows from 15 countries on five continents. No single individual trained as many leaders or had a broader impact on pediatric endocrinology. He died on October 4, 2016, of a heart attack.

== Awards and honors ==
- 1966 Joseph Mather Smith Prize from Columbia University
- 1971 Collège de France Medal, Paris
- 1971 Borden Award for Research in Pediatrics, American Academy of Pediatrics
- 1980 Robert H. Williams Distinguished Leadership Award, the Endocrine Society
- 1984 Elected Member, Institute of Medicine of the National Academy of Sciences
- 1985 Fellow, American Association for the Advancement of Science
- 1988 Alumni Gold Medal for Distinguished Achievement in Medicine from Columbia University College of Physicians and Surgeons
- 1991 D.M. honoris causa, University of Geneva, Switzerland
- 1992 Fred Conrad Koch Award and Medal for Research from the Endocrine Society (shared with Selna Kaplan)
- 1995 Elected Member, National Academy of Sciences
- 1995 Elected Fellow, American Academy of Arts and Sciences
- 1996 Lifetime Achievement Medical Education Award from the American Academy of Pediatrics
- 1997 John Howland Award from the American Pediatric Society
- 2000 D. honoris causa, University René Descartes, Paris V
- 2006 Judson J. Van Wyk Prize for Career Achievement in Pediatric Endocrinology from the Lawson Wilkins Pediatric Endocrine Society
- 2008 D. honoris causa, University of Athens, Greece
- 2010 Recipient of the University of California, San Francisco Medal
