= Claude Migeon =

French pediatric endocrinologist (1923–2018)

Claude Jean Migeon (1923 – March 4, 2018) was a French pediatric endocrinologist who spent the majority of his career at the Johns Hopkins Hospital.

== Early life ==
Migeon was born in 1923 in Lievin, France, to Andre Migeon, a printer, and Pauline Descamps. While simultaneously working with the French Resistance during the German occupation of France in World War II, he earned a bachelor's degree from the Lycée de Reims in 1942. He obtained his medical degree from the University of Paris in 1950. He did further postdoctoral work in biochemistry at the University of Paris and trained in pediatrics at the Hôpital des Enfants Malades.

== Career ==
Migeon received a Fulbright Scholarship in 1950 which allowed him to travel to the United States, where he studied under Lawson Wilkins at the Johns Hopkins Hospital in Baltimore. Migeon worked as a fellow alongside Wilkins for two years before taking on a three-year research project with biochemist Leo T. Samuels at the University of Utah School of Medicine. He then returned to Johns Hopkins, and when Wilkins retired in 1960, Migeon was appointed co-director of the pediatric endocrinology division with Robert M. Blizzard. Migeon became the sole director when Blizzard left in 1974, and held the role until 1994. He retired in 2016, becoming a professor emeritus at Johns Hopkins.

Migeon's research focused largely on steroid metabolism and adrenal function. He was also interested in disorders of sex development including congenital adrenal hyperplasia and androgen insensitivity syndrome. In 1950, he became the first person to treat congenital adrenal hyperplasia with cortisone, which then became the standard of care for that condition. With gynaecologist Howard W. Jones and sexologist John Money, he established the first of its kind in the U.S. Johns Hopkins Gender Identity Clinic in 1965. Migeon and Robert Blizzard founded with Lawson Wilkins Pediatric Endocrine Society in 1972, and Migeon served as the society's founding president. By 1978, having published over 300 articles, Migeon was considered one of the world's most-cited scientists at the time. His research earned him numerous awards including the Endocrine Society's Robert H. Williams Distinguished Service Award in 1991 and the European Society of Pediatric Endocrinology's International Award in 2015.

He was married to Barbara Migeon, an American geneticist.
