= Mezre =

Mezre may refer to:

- Məzrə (disambiguation), places in Azerbaijan
- Mazraeh, Shabestar, Iran
- Mezre, a former name of Elazığ, Turkey
