= Məzrə =

Məzrə or Mazra or Mezre may refer to:

- Məzrə, Babek, Azerbaijan
- Məzrə, Jabrayil, Azerbaijan
- Məzrə, Ordubad, Azerbaijan
- Məzrə, Qubadli, Azerbaijan
- Yuxarı Məzrə, Jabrayil, Azerbaijan
