= Selna Kaplan =

American pediatric endocrinologist

- Born: Selna Lucille Kaplan; April 8, 1927; New York City, U.S.
- Died: July 21, 2010 (aged 83); San Francisco, California, U.S.
- Education: Brooklyn College (BA, 1948); Washington University in St. Louis (MA, PhD, 1953; MD, 1955)
- Known for: Clinical trials of engineered growth hormone treatment Biochemical assays for pediatric hormone levels
- Awards: Ayerst Award for Distinguished Service (1987); Fred Conrad Koch Award (1992)
- Scientific career
- Workplaces: University of California, San Francisco

Selna Lucille Kaplan (April 8, 1927 – July 21, 2010) was an American pediatric endocrinologist and a professor of pediatrics at the University of California, San Francisco. She led the first American clinical trials of growth hormone treatment.

== Early life ==
Kaplan was born in Brooklyn, New York City, on April 8, 1927. Her parents were first cousins from Lithuania who migrated to the United States as teenagers; she had one younger sister who died from erysipelas when Selna was four years old. She attended Midwood High School, where she excelled in biology. She continued to study biology at Brooklyn College, graduating in 1948. She did not favor her chances of being admitted to medical school because she was female, Jewish, and from a city college, and so she applied to graduate school at Washington University in St. Louis to study anatomy. She completed a Master's degree and finished her PhD, with a thesis on vitamin E abnormalities in pregnant rats, in 1953. She then transferred to the Washington University School of Medicine, and received an MD in 1955.

== Career ==
After graduating from medical school, Kaplan returned to New York City, where she completed an internship at Bellevue Hospital and a residency in pediatrics at Kings County Hospital. Upon completion of her pediatric training in 1958, she began a postdoctoral fellowship with Melvin M. Grumbach in pediatric endocrinology at Columbia University. In 1966, Kaplan followed Grumbach to San Francisco, where Grumbach had been appointed the chair of pediatrics at the University of California, San Francisco (UCSF). Kaplan later became a professor of pediatrics at UCSF, a position that she held for almost 40 years, and was given emeritus status in 2000.

During her career at UCSF, Kaplan authored more than 200 publications. She specialized in children's growth disorders, and when artificial growth hormone was first engineered in the 1980s, she served as the principal investigator in the first clinical trials of growth hormone treatment in the United States. Her report on the success of these initial trials was published in The Lancet in 1986. Together, Kaplan and Grumbach developed numerous biochemical tests to measure hormone levels in children, babies, and fetuses. The Endocrine Society awarded Kaplan the Ayerst Award for Distinguished Service in 1987 and the Fred Conrad Koch Award, its highest honor, shared with Grumbach, in 1992.

== Death ==
Kaplan died in San Francisco on July 21, 2010, after a long period of Alzheimer's disease.
