= Armand Viellard-Migeon =

French politician (1842–1905)

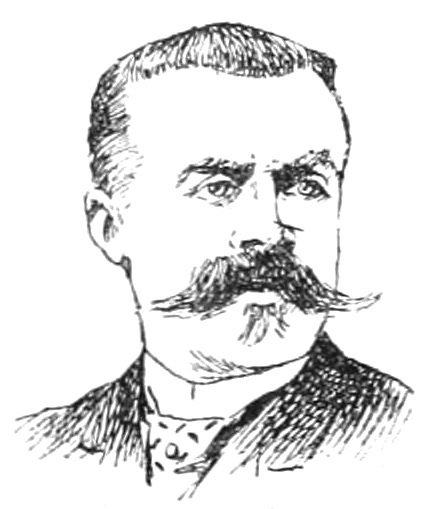
- Born: 24 September 1842; Méziré
- Died: 19 July 1905 (aged 62)
- Occupation: Politician
- Parent: François Viellard-Migeon

Armand Viellard-Migeon (1842–1905) was a French politician. He served in the Chamber of Deputies from 1885 to 1889.

== Early life ==
Armand Viellard-Migeon was born in Méziré on 24 September 1842. His father, François Viellard-Migeon, was a politician.

== Career ==
Viellard-Migeon served as a member of the Chamber of Deputies from 1885 to 1889.

== Death ==
Viellard-Migeon died on 19 July 1905.
