= Arboretum de la Pipe Qui Fume =

Garden in France

Coordinates: 49.85685°N 4.77190°E

The Arboretum de la Pipe Qui Fume (4 hectares) is an arboretum located in the Forêt Domaniale des Hazelles at Bogny-sur-Meuse, Ardennes, Grand-Est, France. It is open daily without charge.

The arboretum site was founded in 1996 by the Société d'Histoire Naturelle des Ardennes, and is currently managed by the Office National des Forêts, which offers guided tours. It contains trees, including ash and maple, shrubs, perennial plants, ferns, and annual flowers, growing about a deep ravine with slopes to 35%.

== See also ==
- List of botanical gardens in France
