= Bogny-sur-Meuse =

- Commune
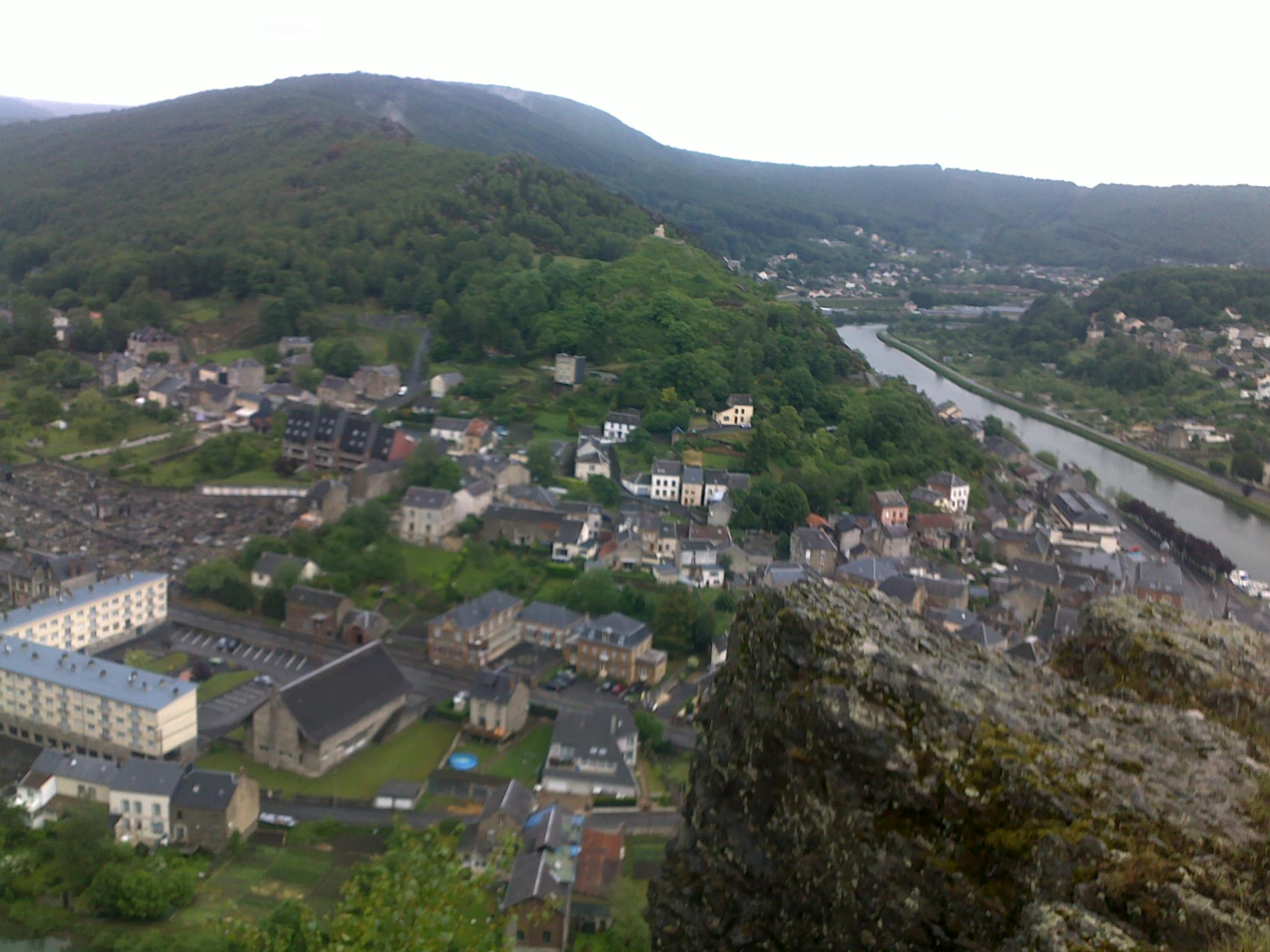
- View of the town

- Coat of arms
- Location of Bogny-sur-Meuse
- Location within France Location within Grand Est
- Coordinates: 49°51′03″N 4°46′04″E
- Country: France
- Region: Grand Est
- Department: Ardennes
- Arrondissement: Charleville-Mézières
- Canton: Bogny-sur-Meuse
- Intercommunality: Vallées et Plateau d'Ardenne

Government
  - Mayor (2020–2026): Kevin Gengoux
- Area^{1}: 23.16 km^{2} (8.94 sq mi)
- Elevation: 165 m (541 ft)
- Population (2023): 4,889
  - Density: 211.1/km^{2} (546.7/sq mi)
- Time zone: UTC+01:00 (CET)
  - Summer (DST): UTC+02:00 (CEST)
- INSEE/Postal code: 08081 /08120
- ^{1} French Land Register data, which excludes lakes, ponds, glaciers > 1 km^{2} (0.386 sq mi or 247 acres) and river estuaries.

Bogny-sur-Meuse (French pronunciation: [bɔɲi syʁ møz], literally Bogny on Meuse) is a commune in the Ardennes department in the Grand Est region of northern France. Bogny-sur-Meuse is known for multiple sites linked to the medieval legend of The Four Sons of Aymon, such as the Hermitage, the statue of Bayard the horse, and the four peaks symbolizing the four brothers. Situated in the Ardennes mountains, the commune extends along the banks of the Meuse.

== History ==
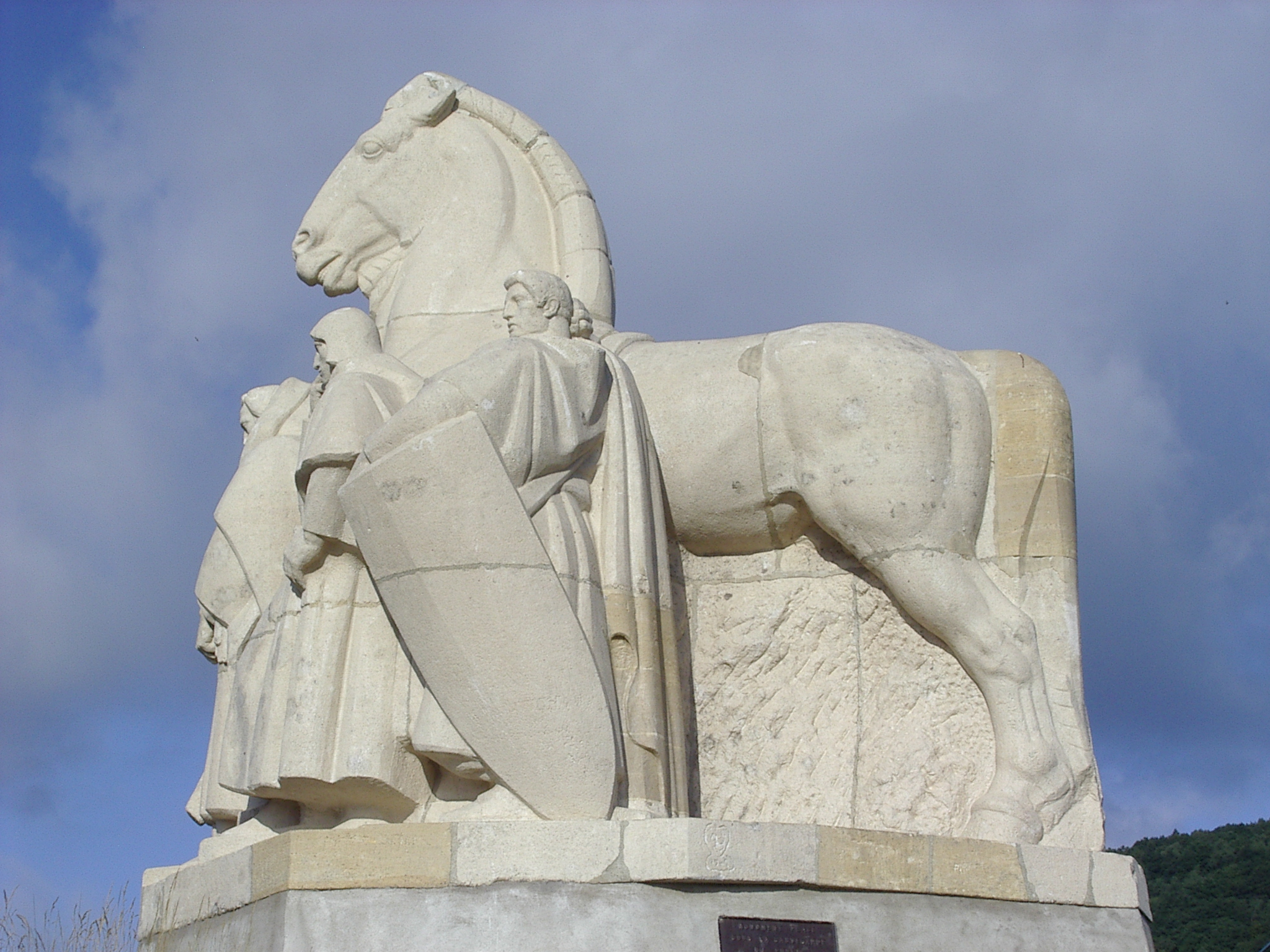
Statue of Bayard the horse

Bogny-sur-Meuse came into existence when the villages of Château-Regnault-Bogny, Braux and Levrézy merged in 1967.

The fortress of Château-Regnault used to stand at the present site of the statue of Bayard the horse. During the erection of the statue in 1933, some archaeological finds were made: coins, swords, arrowheads, dishes, and some bones of animals. In the 19th and 20th centuries other finds were made at this same site, the nature of which suggested an occupation of the area prior to the medieval period.

The last sovereigns of this principality were François de Bourbon, Prince of Conti and Louise Marguerite of Lorraine. The reign of the prince lasted until 1614. When he died, his wife retained the principality until 1629, when she yielded it to King Louis XIII.

In the 19th century, an industry of metalworking developed on the banks of the Meuse, with people fashioning bolts and other similar products in workshops. This served to industrialise the region, replacing the smaller, more artisan ironmongeries. Contractors Maré and Joseph built a factory which quickly became the most important producer of bolts in the department of Ardennes. Its activity ceased almost entirely during the Second World War, and the factory closed its doors in 1953. Today, for the most part, this metalworking tradition has disappeared from Bogny-sur-Meuse, although a few residents remain knowledgeable in metallurgy.

== Geography ==
Bogny-sur-Meuse is located within the Ardennes Massif, in a hilly forested area. The Meuse crosses through the town.

== Geology ==
A dividing line between strata of the Cambrian and Devonian periods runs north-west-south-east through the Hermitage and the quarries of the Pleines Roches above the Château Marcadet. To the north of this limit, the rock is early Cambrian (between 540 and 500 million years), characterised by clear or white quartzites, green shales, and grey phyllites. To the south, the Devonian rock is represented by grey schists, phyllites and quartzites. Schists and phyllades from this region are often calcareous. All these rocks were transformed by metamorphism and folded during two orogenies (Caledonian, then Variscan).

== Economy ==
In the 20th century, there was a prolific industry of metalworking in Bogny-sur-Meuse, which largely ceased after World War Two. However, Ateliers des Janves (A.D.J.), a French forgery and stamping company, was established in the industrial zone of Braux in the early 1990s. This was the first autonomous manufacturer of connecting rods in France and the second in Europe.

Bogny-sur-Meuse is part of the Ardennes Free Zone which offers favourable conditions for growth and development.

== Population ==
Historical population

Year	Pop.	±% p.a.
1793	1,015	—
1800	1,059	+0.61%
1806	1,057	−0.03%
1821	1,271	+1.24%
1831	1,299	+0.22%
1836	1,498	+2.89%
1841	1,522	+0.32%
1846	1,657	+1.71%
1851	1,703	+0.55%
1866	2,154	+1.58%
1872	2,407	+1.87%
1876	2,540	+1.35%
1881	2,854	+2.36%
1886	2,841	−0.09%
1891	2,836	−0.04%
1896	2,775	−0.43%
1901	3,065	+2.01%
1906	3,093	+0.18%

Year	Pop.	±% p.a.
1911	3,384	+1.81%
1921	2,907	−1.51%
1926	3,023	+0.79%
1931	3,031	+0.05%
1936	2,761	−1.85%
1946	2,306	−1.78%
1954	2,680	+1.90%
1962	3,098	+1.83%
1968	6,715	+13.76%
1975	6,855	+0.30%
1982	6,261	−1.29%
1990	5,981	−0.57%
1999	5,838	−0.27%
2007	5,566	−0.59%
2012	5,354	−0.77%
2017	5,100	−0.97%
2023	4,889	−0.70%

Source: EHESS and INSEE (1968-2023)

== Notable people ==
- Jean Rogissart (1894–1961), a writer born in Braux.
- Maurice Blin (1922–2016), former senator of the Fifth Republic born in Levrézy.
- Jean-Baptiste Migeon (1768–1845), born in Braux, represented Haut-Rhin in the Chamber of Deputies from 1827 to 1831.

== Sights ==
- There are four rocky crags on a mountain peak near Bogny-sur-Meuse, which are said to symbolise the Four Sons of Aymon. A statue of their magical horse, Bayard, stands nearby.
- The collegiate church of Saint-Vivent de Braux is one of the oldest churches in the valley of the Meuse, founded in the 9th century during the Carolingian era. It was made a monument historique in 1963.
- The Château Marcadet is a large château, which was made a monument historique in 2000.
- Arboretum de la Pipe Qui Fume
- The Museum of Minerals and Fossils
- The Ardennes Museum of Metallurgy
- The City Hall of Bogny on Meuse labeled ACR (Remarkable Contemporary Architecture)

=== Industrial remnants ===
- The workers' lodgings (on rue de l'Echelle).
- The old nursery (on rue Bernisseau).
- The former co-operative, now a butchers (on rue Jourdes).

== Gallery ==
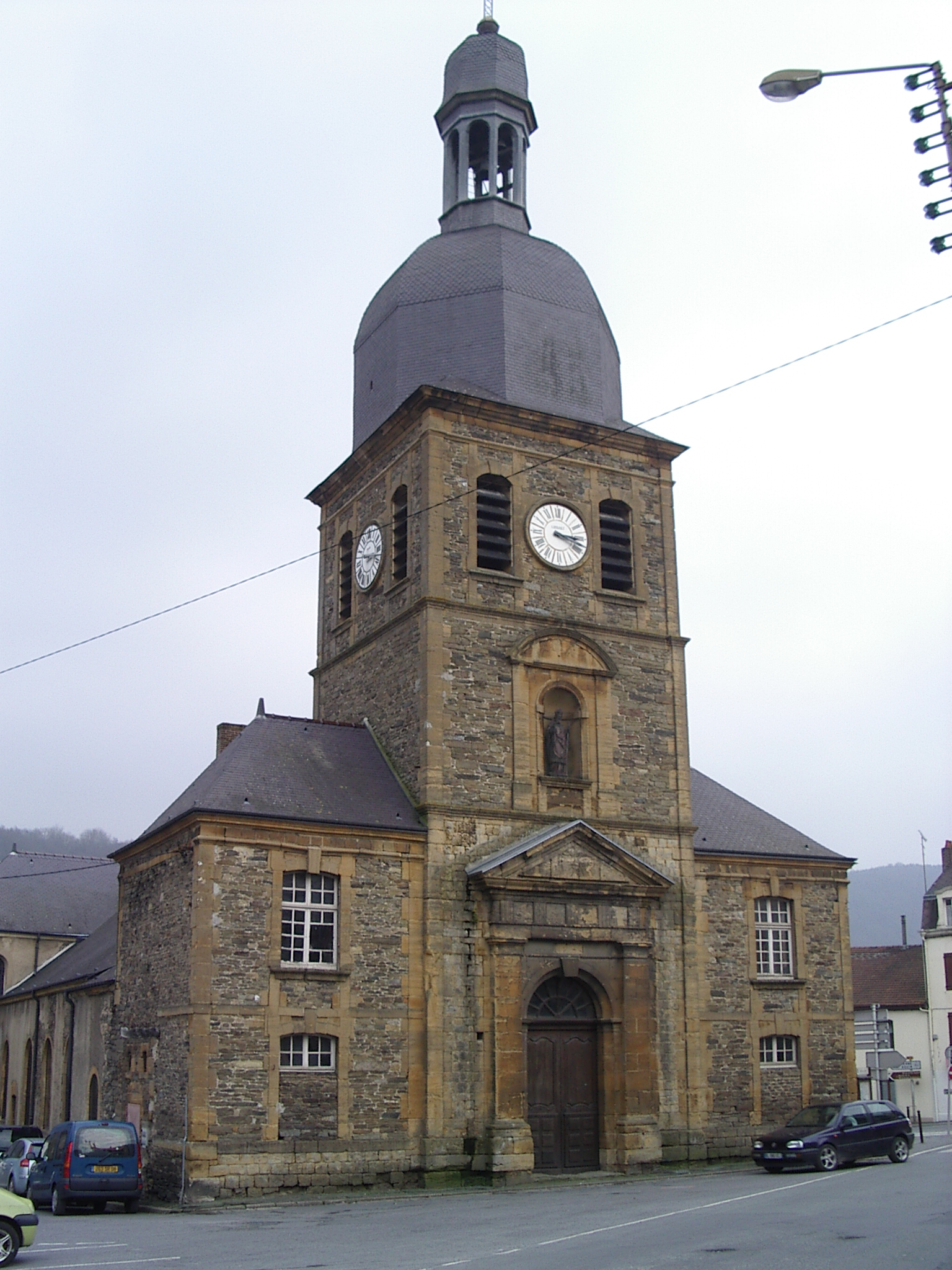
Saint-Vivent de Braux collegiate church

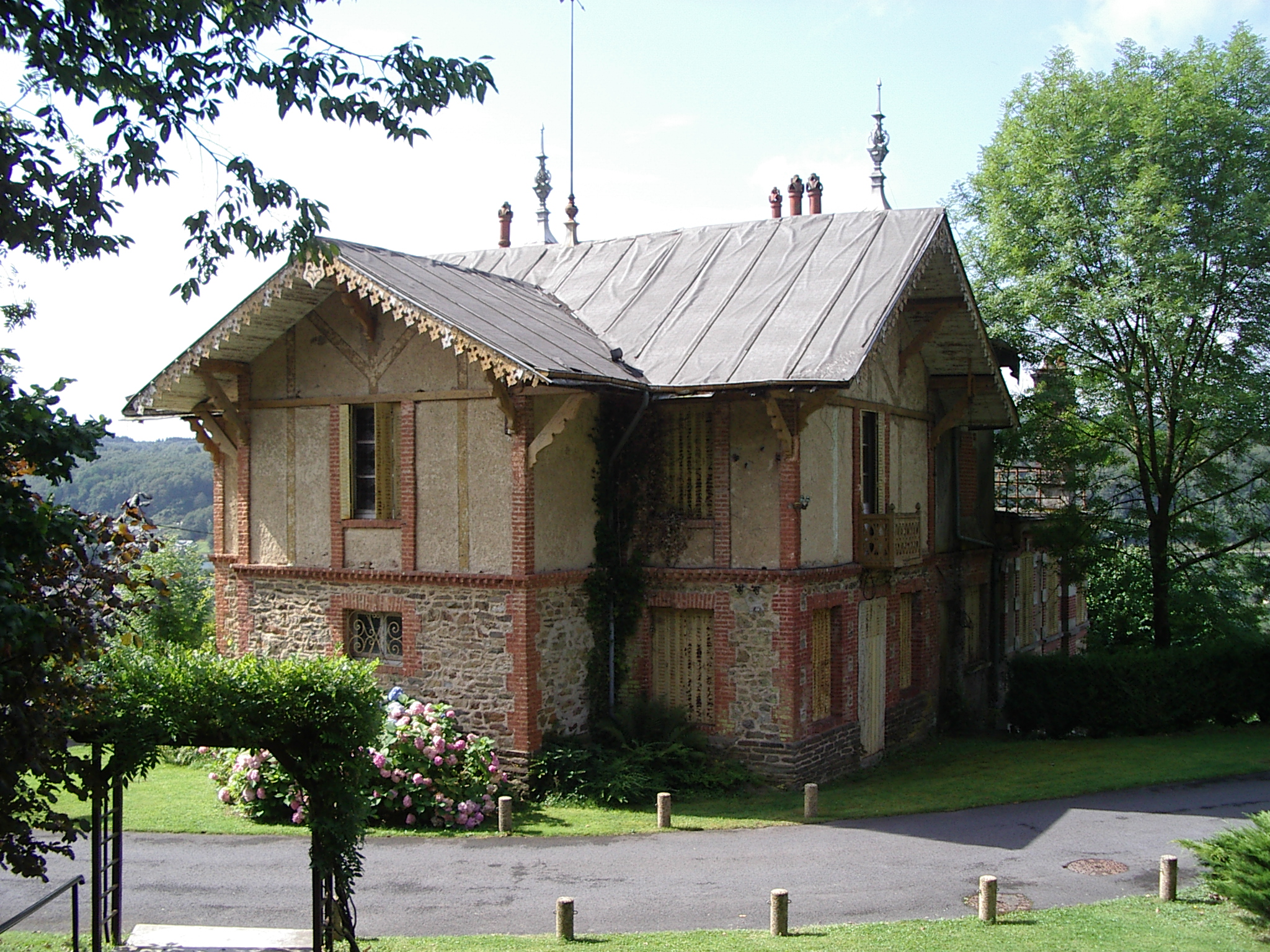
Château Marcadet

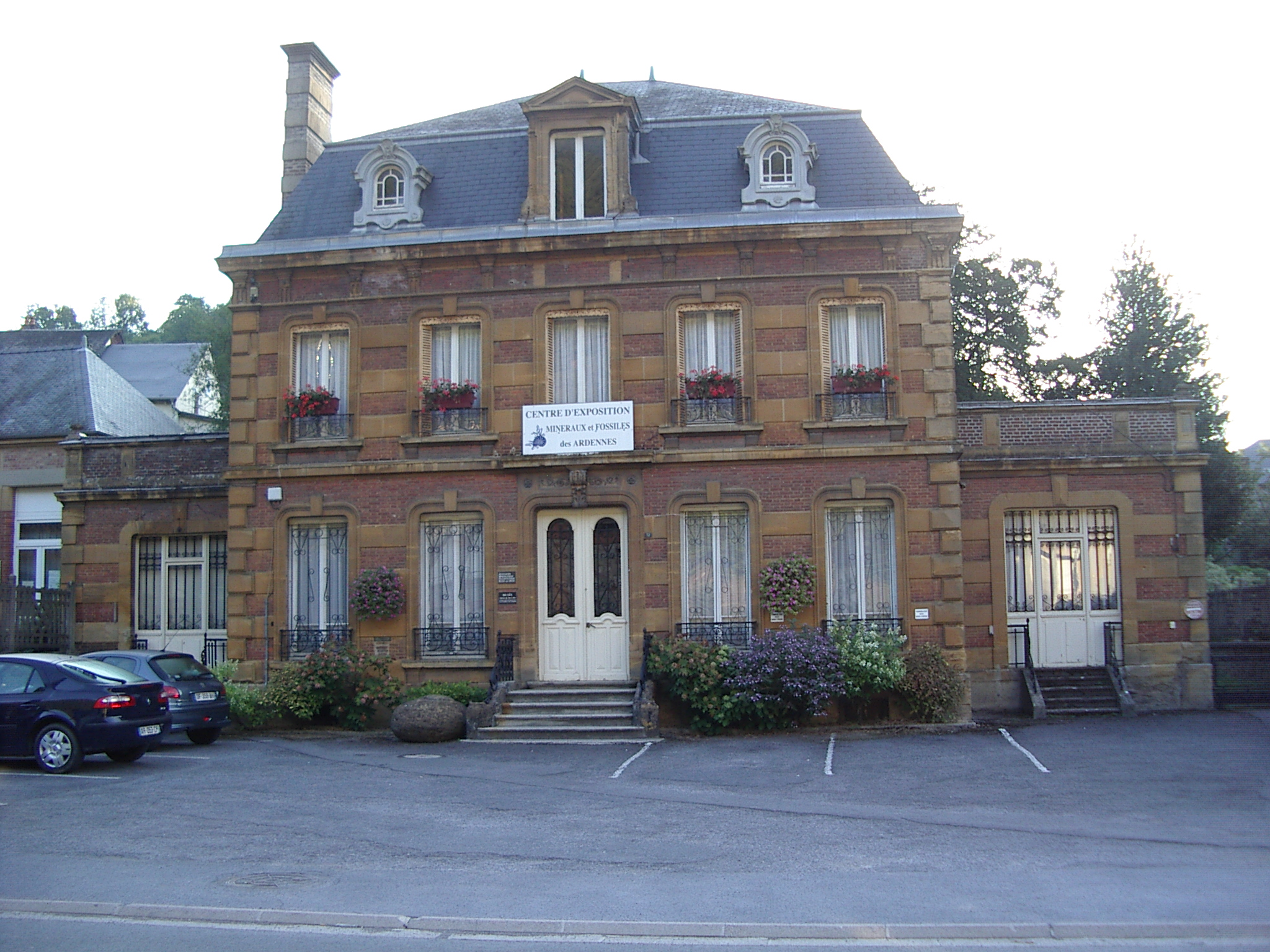
Museum of Minerals and Fossils

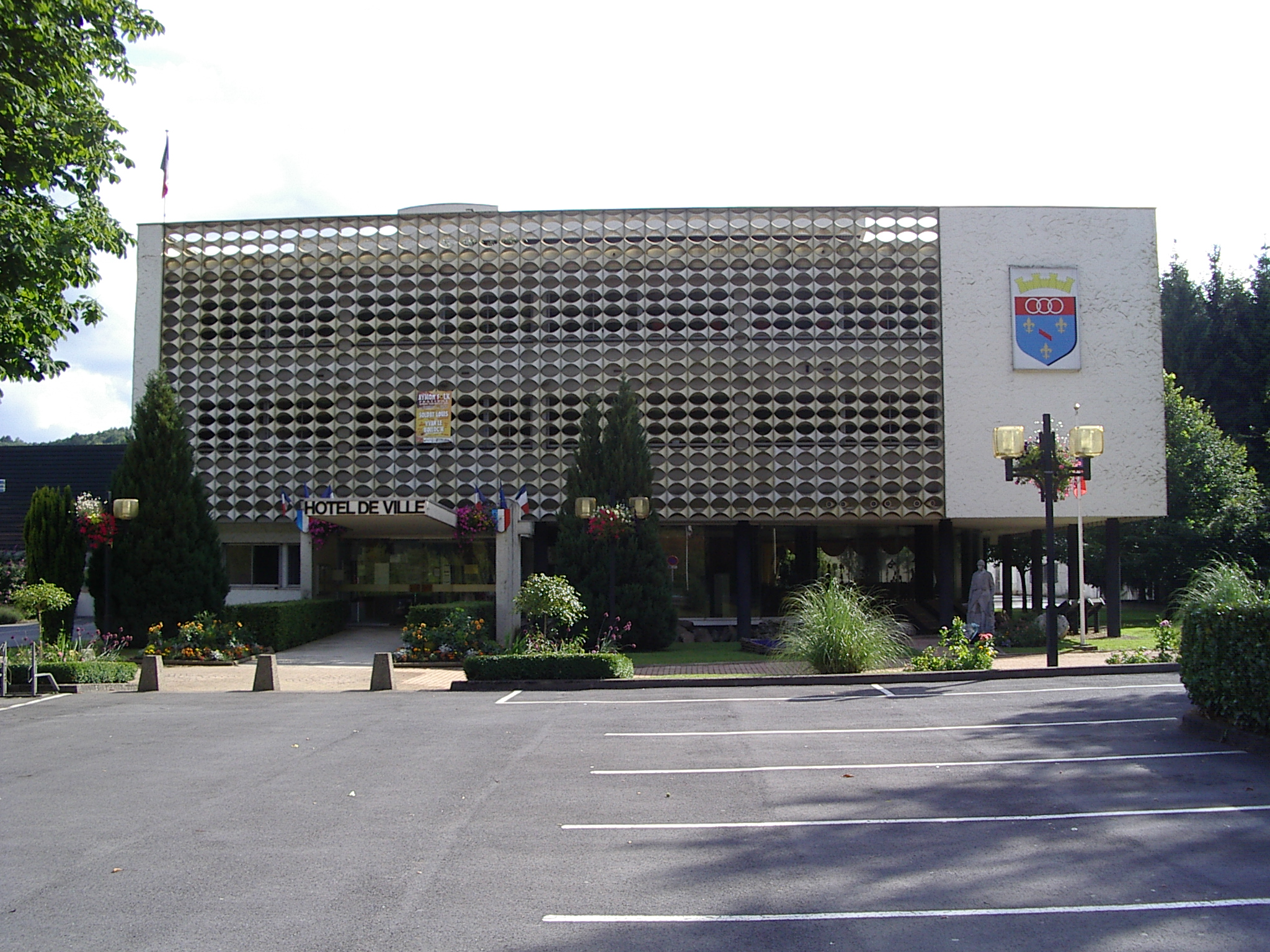
Bogny-sur-Meuse town hall

== See also ==
- Communes of the Ardennes department
