= C. Garrison Fathman =

American medical doctor and academic

- Born: Charles Garrison Fathman
- Education: Washington University School of Medicine (M.D., 1969)
- Occupations: Physician, immunologist, academic
- Known for: Research in T cell anergy, autoimmunity, and molecular immunology
- Title: Professor of Medicine; Chief, Division of Immunology and Rheumatology (Emeritus)
- Scientific career
- Workplaces: Stanford University School of Medicine

C. Garrison Fathman is a Professor of Medicine and Division Chief of Immunology and Rheumatology at Stanford University School of Medicine. He is also the Associate Director of the Institute for Immunity, Transplantation and Infection and Director of the Center for Clinical Immunology at Stanford University. He was Founder and first-President of the Federation of Clinical Immunology Societies. As Director of the CCIS, Dr. Fathman initiated a multidisciplinary approach to study and treat autoimmune diseases, including rheumatoid arthritis, multiple sclerosis, and insulin-dependent diabetes mellitus, and initiated several new approaches to education and community outreach.

== Academic career ==
Dr. Fathman received his M.D. from Washington University School of Medicine 1969. He subsequently completed his residency training at Dartmouth Affiliated Hospitals and completed a fellowship in immunology and rheumatology at Stanford University. Fathman then spent four years doing research, first as a clinical associate at the National Cancer Institute of the NIH, and then as a member of the Basel Institute of Immunology in Switzerland. He returned to the United States to join the faculty at the Mayo Clinic Medical School in 1977 and was recruited back to Stanford University in 1981.

== Research ==
Dr. Fathman has been and continues to be a leading figure in the field of clinical immunology. His research centers on a molecular and cellular understanding of CD4 T cell responsiveness in mice and man.

== Awards and honors ==
President of the Federation of Clinical immunology Societies: Distinguished Achievement in Clinical Investigation, Society of Investigative Dermatology; President of the Clinical immunology Society; Council of ACSI; Director JDRF Center of Excellence; director, NIH Autoimmunity Prevention Center; Director of the Center for Clinical immunology at Stanford; Associate Director, Institute of Immunity, Transplantation and Infection, Stanford Medical School; Co-Chairman of the Autoimmunity Committee of the Immune Tolerance Network; Naomi M. Kanof Award for Distinguished Achievement in Clinical Investigation, Society for Investigative Dermatology; Washington University Medical School Alumni Achievement Award; Clinical Immunology Society President’s Award; American College of Rheumatology Master; Federation of Clinical Immunology Society Founder’s Award.

== Professional organizations ==
Fathman is a member of many professional organizations, including the American Association of Immunologists (AAI) and the Association of American Physicians (AAP), and is past council member of the American Society for Clinical Investigation (ASCI) and past president of the Clinical Immunology Society (CIS). He was associate editor of the Annual Review of Immunology for 25 years and serves on the editorial boards of numerous scientific journals. Fathman has chaired a variety of national and international professional meetings, served on NIH study sections and numerous blue ribbon panels and has written more than 300 articles on his research in molecular and cellular immunology.

- Council of ASCI;
- President of the Clinical Immunology Society;
- President of the Federation of Clinical Immunology Societies;
- SAB Barbara Davis Center Without Walls (MS research),
- Associate editor, Annual Review of Immunology for 25 years,
- Council Henry Kunkel Society,
- Chairman of the FASEB summer conference on Autoimmunity (1983, 1986, 1988, 1995, 1997)
- Chairman NIH Immunological Sciences and Hyper-accelerated Award/Mechanisms in Immune Disease Study Sections,
- HHMI Review Panel for the Research Training Fellowships for Medical Students Program

== Selected bibliography ==
1. Fathman C.G., and Hengartner, H. (1978) Clones of alloreactive T cells. Nature 272:617-8.
2. Kimoto, Masao, and Fathman, C. Garrison. (1981) Antigen-reactive T cell clones. I. Transcomplementing hybrid I-A-region gene products function effectively in antigen presentation. J. Exp. Med. 152:759-70.
3. Shizuru, Judith, Gregory, Anita K., Chao, Cynthia and Fathman, C.G. (1987) Islet allograft survival after a single course of treatment of recipient with antibody to L3T4. Science 237:278-280.
4. Shizuru, Judith, Taylor-Edwards, Cariel, Banks, Beth Ann, Gregory, Anita K. and Fathman, C. Garrison. (1988) Immunotherapy of the nonobese diabetic mouse: treatment with an antibody to T-helper lymphocytes. Science 240:659-652.
5. Gaur, Amitabh, Weirs, Brook, Liu, Angela, Rothbard, Jonathan, and Fathman, C. Garrison. (1992) Amelioration of autoimmune encephalomyelitis by myelin basic protein synthetic peptide-induced anergy. Science 258:1491-1494.
6. Yang, Yang, Charlton, Brett, Shimada, Akira, Taylor-Edwards, Cariel and Fathman, C. Garrison. (1996) Monoclonal T cells identified in early NOD islet infiltrates. Immunity 4:189-194.
7. Anandasabapathy, Niroshana, Ford, Gregory S., Bloom, Deborah…. Fathman, C. Garrison and Soares, Luis. (2003) GRAIL: A novel E3 ubiquitin ligase that inhibits cytokine gene transcription is expressed in anergic CD4+ T cells. Immunity 18:535-54
8. Soares, Luis, Seroogy, Christine, Skrenta, Heidi, Anandasabapathy, Niroshana… and Fathman, C. Garrison. (2004) Two isoforms of otubain 1 regulate T cell anergy via GRAIL. Nat Immunol 5:45-54.
9. Kodama, Keiichi, Butte, Atul J., Creusot, Remi J., Su, Leon, Sheng, Deqiao, Hartnett, Mark, Iwai, Hideyuki, Soares, Luis R., and Fathman, CG. (2008), Tissue and age specific changes in gene expression during disease induction and progression in NOD mice. Clin. Immunol; 129(2): 195-201.
10. Yip L, Su L, Sheng D, Chang P, Atkinson M…. Fathman CG, Creusot RJ. (2009) Deaf1 isoforms control the expression of genes encoding peripheral tissue antigens in the pancreatic lymph nodes during type 1 diabetes. Nature Immunol 9:1026-33
