= Mazra, Iran =

Mazra (Persian: مزرا) in Iran may refer to:

- Mazra, Ahar, East Azerbaijan Province
- Mazra, Shabestar, East Azerbaijan Province
- Mazra, Hamadan
- Mazra, Markazi
