= Bruce David Levy =

Researcher

Bruce D. Levy
- Born: Bruce David Levy
- Education: University of Pennsylvania (BA); University of Pennsylvania School of Medicine (MD); Harvard University (MS (Hon.))
- Scientific career
- Fields: Pulmonology, critical care medicine, inflammation biology
- Workplaces: Washington University School of Medicine; Harvard Medical School; Brigham and Women's Hospital; Mass General Brigham

Bruce D. Levy is an American physician-scientist specializing in pulmonology and critical care medicine. He is the executive vice chancellor for medical affairs and the George and Carol Bauer Dean of Washington University School of Medicine at Washington University in St. Louis, where he also holds the Joseph Erlanger Distinguished Professorship. He previously served as the Hersey Professor of the Theory and Practice of Physic at Harvard Medical School and as the inaugural executive vice-chair of the Department of Medicine at Mass General Brigham. His clinical specialties include acute respiratory distress syndrome, asthma, bronchiectasis, and chronic obstructive pulmonary disease.

== Early life and education ==
Levy is a child of Morton A. Levy (hematology, oncology) and Marilyn A. Levy (electron microscopist) and a nephew of Richard D. Aach (hepatology), all of whom were members of the Washington University School of Medicine faculty. Levy received a Bachelor of Arts from the University of Pennsylvania in 1984. He received his Doctor of Medicine degree from the University of Pennsylvania School of Medicine in 1988.

He completed a residency in internal medicine at Brigham and Women's Hospital, where he served as chief medical resident under Marshall A. Wolf and Eugene Braunwald. He subsequently completed clinical fellowships in pulmonary and critical care medicine under Jeffrey M. Drazen and a research fellowship in biochemistry in the laboratory of Charles N. Serhan.

== Career ==
Levy joined the faculty of Harvard Medical School in 1993. He held the Parker B. Francis Professorship of Medicine from 2015 to 2024 and was appointed Hersey Professor of the Theory and Practice of Physic in 2024.

At Brigham and Women's Hospital, Levy held academic and clinical leadership positions in internal medicine and pulmonary care. He served as associate residency program director for academics and career development from 2000 to 2013, before becoming chief of pulmonary and critical care medicine in 2013. He was also the founding medical director of the hospital's Lung Clinical Center and the founding co-director of the Lung Research Center at the Brigham Research Institute.

In 2022, Levy became interim chair of the Department of Medicine at Brigham and Women's Hospital and was appointed chair the following year. He also served as physician-in-chief of the hospital. In 2024, he became co-chair of the Department of Medicine at Mass General Brigham and was appointed its inaugural executive vice-chair in 2025.

On July 1, 2026, Levy became executive vice chancellor for medical affairs at Washington University in St. Louis and the George and Carol Bauer Dean of WashU Medicine, succeeding David H. Perlmutter. He also holds the Joseph Erlanger Distinguished Professorship.

== Research ==
Levy's research concerns the biological processes that resolve pulmonary inflammation following infection, injury or potentially noxious stimuli (e.g., allergen, particulate matter). His work has helped to characterize and define the resolution of inflammation as an active process. His laboratory has particularly examined fundamental molecular and cellular aspects of specialized pro-resolving mediators and their roles in human inflammatory lung conditions, including asthma, pneumonia, acute respiratory distress syndrome and long COVID. His work was the first to define a chronic inflammatory disease (i.e., severe asthma) as a clinical syndrome of deficient resolution.

His laboratory has received continuous funding from the National Institutes of Health since 1993. By 2026, he had authored more than 300 peer-reviewed journal articles and held more than ten patents that had been awarded or were pending. In 2016, with Clifford Woolf and Bruce Bean, Levy co-founded Nocion Therapeutics, a biotechnology company developing treatments for chronic cough.

== Selected honors ==
Levy received the Dean's Community Service Award from Harvard Medical School and the Harvard School of Dental Medicine in 2003. He was elected a member of the American Society for Clinical Investigation in 2007 and the Association of American Physicians in 2014. He was named a fellow of the European Respiratory Society in 2016 and the American Thoracic Society in 2018. In 2018, he also received the American Thoracic Society's Recognition Award for Scientific Accomplishments.
