= Jules Migeon =

French author, businessman and politician (1815–1868)

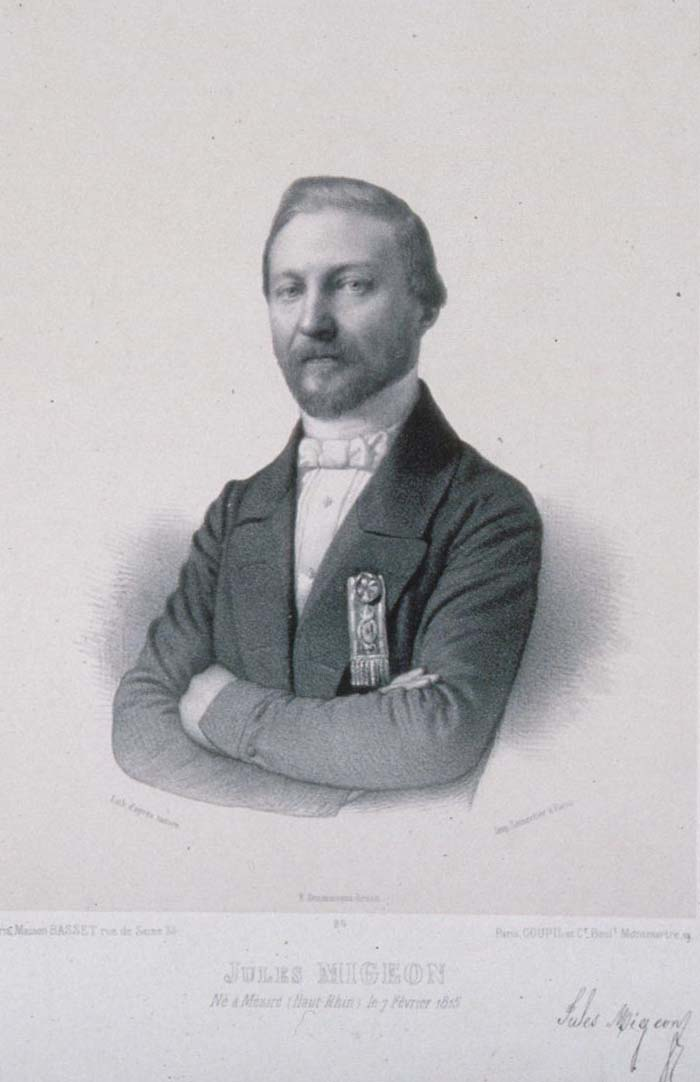
- Born: 7 February 1815; Méziré, France
- Died: 20 March 1868 (aged 53); Zug, Switzerland
- Occupations: Author, businessman, politician
- Parent: Jean-Baptiste Migeon

Jules Migeon (1815–1868) was a French author, businessman and politician. He served in the Corps législatif from 1852 to 1859.

== Early life ==
Jules Migeon was born on 7 February 1815 in Méziré, France. His father, Jean-Baptiste Migeon, was a businessman.

Migeon studied the Classics in Haut-Rhin and Paris.

== Career ==
Migeon published short stories in Le Pionnier, a literary magazine, as early as 1844. He published his first novel, Louise, shortly after. Two years later, in 1846, he published, La France et ses institutions, a book about French institutions.

Migeon acquired the Zola Dam, built by François Zola, near Aix-en-Provence in 1853. It was dedicated in 1854.

Migeon was conservative. He served in the Corps législatif from 1852 to 1859, representing Haut-Rhin.

Migeon was a papal count.

== Death ==
Migeon died on 20 March 1868 in Zug, Switzerland.
