= Washington University School of Medicine =

Medical school in St. Louis, Missouri, US

Coordinates: 38.6370°N 90.2646°W

- Type: Private
- Established: 1891
- Parent institution: Washington University in St. Louis
- Dean: Bruce D. Levy
- Faculty: 1874
- Students: 1,379 (includes 647 MD, 219 OT, and 254 PT)
- Location: St. Louis, Missouri, U.S.
- Campus: Urban
- Website: medicine.washu.edu

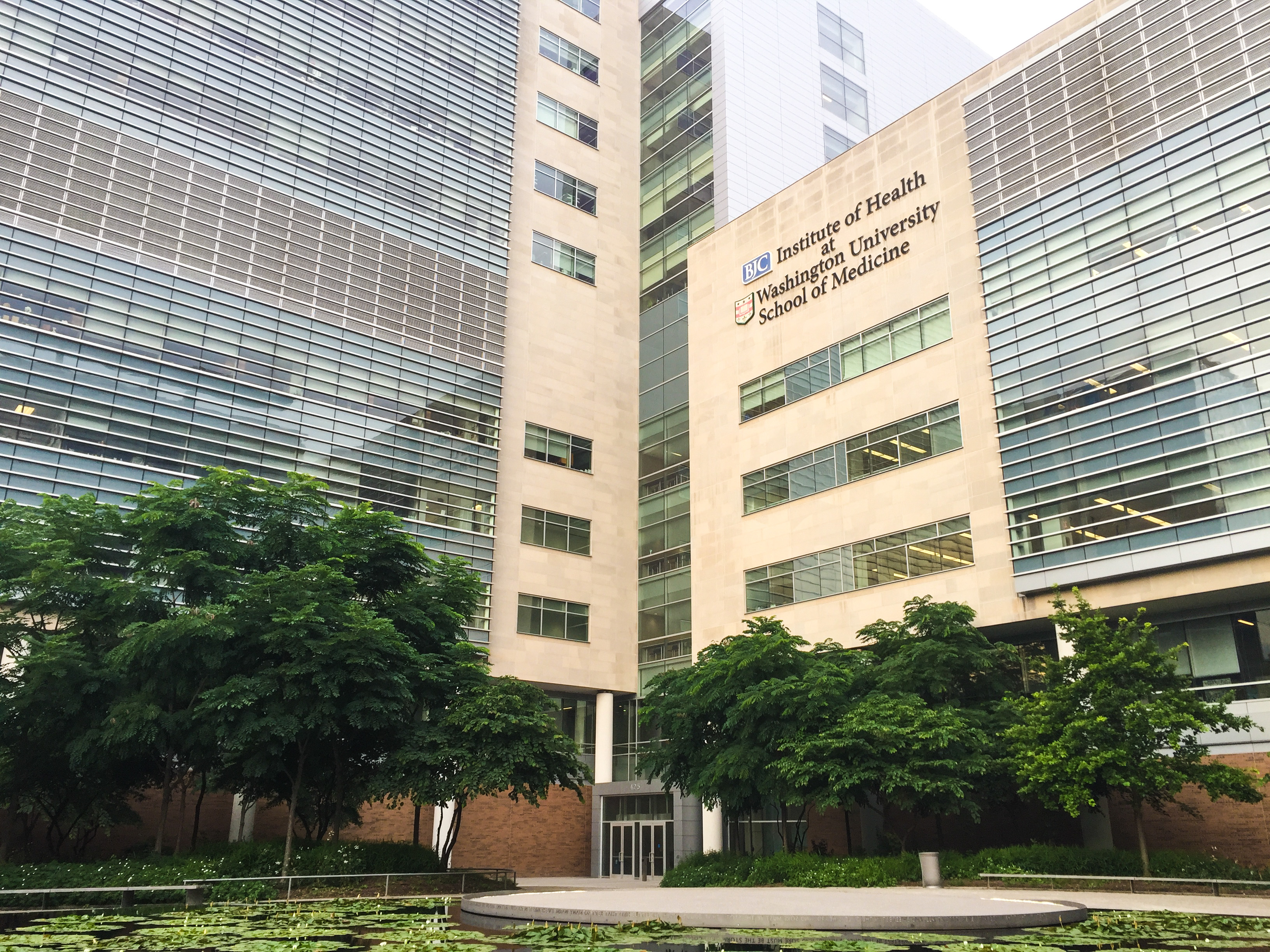
The BJC Institute of Health on the WashU Medicine campus

Washington University School of Medicine (WashU Medicine) is the medical school of Washington University in St. Louis, located in the Central West End neighborhood of St. Louis, Missouri. Founded in 1891, the School of Medicine shares a campus with Barnes-Jewish Hospital, St. Louis Children's Hospital, and the Alvin J. Siteman Cancer Center.

The clinical service is provided by Washington University Physicians, a comprehensive medical and surgical practice providing treatment in more than 75 medical specialties. Washington University Physicians are the medical staff of the school's two teaching hospitals – Barnes-Jewish Hospital and St. Louis Children's Hospital. They also provide inpatient and outpatient care at the St. Louis Veteran's Administration Hospital, hospitals of the BJC HealthCare system, and 35 other office locations throughout the greater St. Louis region.

== History ==
Medical classes were first held at Washington University in 1891 after the St. Louis Medical College decided to affiliate with the university, establishing a Medical Department. Robert S. Brookings, a university benefactor from its earliest days, devoted much of his work and philanthropy to Washington University and made the improvement of the Medical Department one of his primary objectives. This stemmed from concern after an early 1900s Carnegie Foundation report derided the organization and quality of the Medical Department.

Following a trend in medical education across the country, research and the creation of new knowledge became a stated objective in a 1906 course catalog for the Medical Department. For Brookings and the university, incorporating the Medical Department into a separate School of Medicine seemed to be the next logical step. This process began in 1914 when facilities were moved to their current location in St. Louis's Central West End neighborhood in 1914, and was completed in 1918 with the official naming of the School of Medicine. Of note, the first female faculty member is believed to have been biochemist and physiologist Ethel Ronzoni Bishop, who became an assistant professor in 1923.

The Medical School began its escalation from regional renown in the 1940s, a decade when two groups of faculty members received Nobel Prizes, in 1944 and 1947. In 1947, Gerty Cori, a professor at the School of Medicine, became the first woman to win a Nobel Prize in Physiology or Medicine. Professors Carl and Gerty Cori became Washington University's fifth and sixth Nobel laureates for their discovery of how glycogen is broken down and resynthesized in the body.

In 1950, a Cancer Research Building was completed, the first major addition to the School of Medicine since its 1914 move and one of several buildings added in the decade.

The work of the Masters and Johnson team researching human sexual response began in 1957 in the Department of Obstetrics and Gynecology, continuing at the independent not-for-profit research institution they founded in St. Louis in 1964.

In the 1960s the School of Medicine diversified its student body, graduating its first African-American student and substantially increasing the percentage of graduating students who are female to nearly half.

In March 2020, Washington University School of Medicine announced the construction of a new $616 million, 11-story, 609,000-square-foot neuroscience research building which will sit at the eastern edge of the Medical Campus in the Cortex Innovation Community. Construction of the building finished in 2023.

== Campus ==
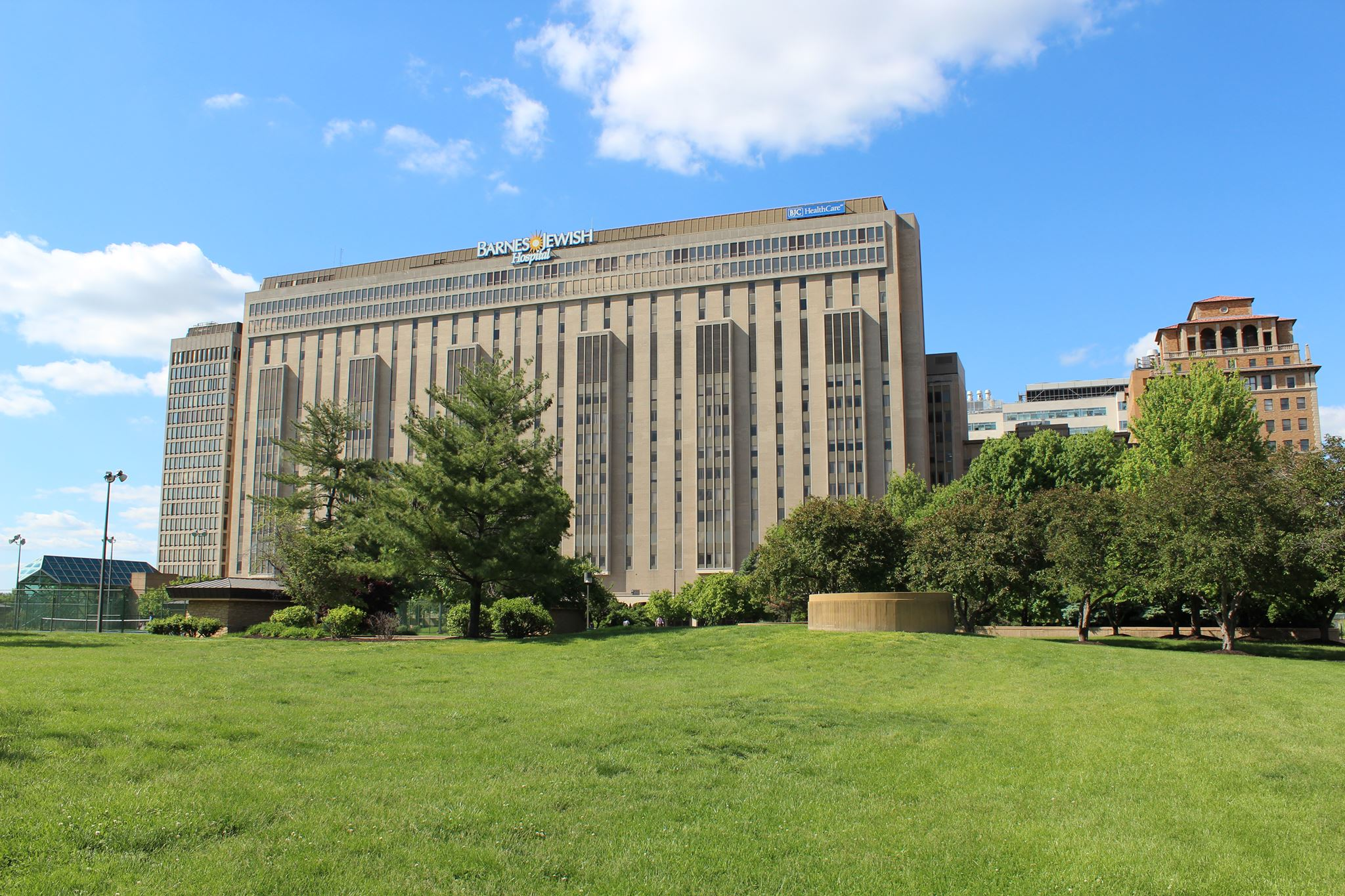
Barnes-Jewish Hospital, which is affiliated with the Medical School

Washington University Medical Campus comprises 186 acres (75.3 ha) spread over about 18 city blocks, located along the eastern edge of Forest Park within the Central West End neighborhood of St. Louis. Barnes-Jewish Hospital and St. Louis Children's Hospital, part of BJC HealthCare, are the teaching hospitals affiliated with the School of Medicine and are also located within the medical complex. Many of the buildings are connected via sky bridges and corridors. As of 2008, the School of Medicine occupies over 4,500,000 square feet (420,000 m^{2}) in the complex.

Olin Residence Hall, named for Spencer T. Olin, provides residential services for 200 medical and graduate students.

Washington University and BJC HealthCare have taken on numerous joint venture projects since their original collaboration in the 1910s. One is the Center for Advanced Medicine, which houses the Alvin J. Siteman Cancer Center and was completed in December 2001. At 650,000 square feet (60,000 m^{2}), it is one of the largest buildings in the complex.

In 2007, construction began on the 700,000-square-foot (65,000 m^{2}) BJC Institutes of Health, of which Washington University's Medical School occupies several floors. It is the largest building constructed on Washington University's campus. Called the BJC Institute of Health at Washington University, it houses the university's BioMed 21 Research Initiative, five interdisciplinary research centers, laboratories, and additional space for The Genome Center.

Prominent buildings, centers, and spaces at the medical campus includes Barnes-Jewish Hospital, the Central Institute for the Deaf, St. Louis Children's Hospital, Rehabilitation Institute of Saint Louis, the Siteman Cancer Center, Center for Advanced Medicine, Charles F. Knight Emergency and Trauma Center, and the Eric P. Newman Education Center.

The complex is accessible via the Central West End MetroLink station, which provides transportation to the rest of Washington University's campuses.

== Rankings and admissions ==
Washington University School of Medicine is recognized as one of the best medical schools in the United States, consistently ranking in the top ten medical schools within the country.

Acceptance to the school's Doctor of Medicine (MD) program is extremely competitive, with more than 6,000 applications for about 124 openings each year. In 2022, accepted applicants had an average MCAT of 522 (99th percentile) and an average undergraduate GPA of 3.94.

Its major teaching hospital, Barnes Jewish Hospital, was recognized in 2023 by U.S. News & World Report as one of the best hospitals in the entire United States, with the university ranked No. 5 in the nation among medical schools for research. According to Doximity's 2024-2025 Residency Rankings, Washington University School of Medicine held top rankings in multiple specialties including #3 in Orthopedic Surgery, #5 in General Surgery, #3 in Radiology, #9 in OB-GYN, #7 in Neurology, and #10 in Neurosurgery.

== Affiliated research institutions ==
- Knight Alzheimer Disease Research Center (Knight ADRC) - founded in 1985, its mission is to promote collaborative research in the treatment and assessment of Alzheimer's disease. The center also provides a training environment for postdoctoral fellows, students in nursing, social work and medicine, along with residents in geriatrics, psychiatry and neurology.
- BioMed 21 - started in 2003, BioMed 21 is an interdisciplinary research center linking life sciences and medical education throughout Washington University. To be housed in a 700,000-square-foot (65,000 m^{2}) facility in the Medical Complex to be named the BJC Institute of Health at Washington University, BioMed 21 includes five Interdisciplinary Research Centers:
  - Center for Cancer Genomics
  - Center for the Investigation of Membrane Excitability Disorders
  - Center for Women's Infectious Disease Research
  - Hope Center Program on Protein Folding and Neurodegeneration
  - Center for Interdisciplinary Studies of Diabetic Cardiovascular Disease
- Central Institute for the Deaf - combines education, research and clinical and community service to benefit individuals who are deaf and hearing-impaired. Audiologists, teachers and scientists serve as graduate program faculty and Washington University graduate students gain experience in real-world situations.
- Hope Center for Neurological Disorders - formed by a collaborative alliance between Washington University School of Medicine and Hope Happens, a St. Louis-based non-profit formerly known as ALS Hope, its mission is to improve the lives of people with neurological disorders (particularly ALS, Alzheimer's Disease, brain and spinal cord injury, cerebral palsy, epilepsy, multiple sclerosis, Parkinson's, and stroke) by discovering the fundamental mechanisms of neurodegeneration and translating this knowledge into new methods for diagnosis, treatment, and prevention.
- Mallinckrodt Institute of Radiology - serves as the Department of Radiology for the Washington University School of Medicine. Institute physicians and scientists are faculty members of the School of Medicine, and physicians are on the medical staff of Barnes-Jewish Hospital and St. Louis Children's Hospital. Multidisciplinary research training programs combine both clinical and basic research.
- McDonnell Genome Institute - an organization focusing on genomics research. The Institute played a major role in the Human Genome Project, to which it contributed 25% of the finished sequence, and is currently a major participant in both The Cancer Genome Atlas and the 1000 Genomes Project.

== Faculty ==
19 Nobel Prize laureates have been associated with the School of Medicine. 15 faculty members are fellows of the National Academy of Sciences; 30 belong to the Institute of Medicine. 116 faculty members hold individual career development awards from the National Institutes of Health (NIH). 77 faculty members hold career development awards from non-federal agencies. 15 faculty members have MERIT status, a special recognition given by the National Institutes of Health that provides long-term, uninterrupted financial support to investigators.

== Nobel laureates ==
Physiology or Medicine

- 1943: Edward A. Doisy (1893–1986), Faculty of Medicine, 1919–1923
- 1944: Joseph Erlanger (1874–1965), Chairman, Department of Physiology 1910–1946
- 1944: Herbert Gasser (1888–1963), Faculty of Medicine, 1916–1931
- 1947: Carl F. Cori (1896–1984), Faculty of Medicine 1931–1984
- 1947: Gerty T. Cori (1896–1957), Faculty of Medicine 1931–1957
- 1959: Arthur Kornberg, Chairman, Department of Microbiology, 1952–1959
- 1959: Severo Ochoa, Faculty of Medicine 1940–1942
- 1969: Alfred Hershey (1908–1997), Faculty of Medicine 1934–1950
- 1971: Earl Sutherland (1915–1974), M.D. 42, Resident in Internal Medicine 1943–1945, Faculty of Medicine, 1945–1953
- 1974: Christian de Duve, Faculty of Medicine 1946–1947
- 1978: Daniel Nathans (1928–1999), M.D. 54
- 1978: Hamilton O. Smith, Washington University Medical Service 1956–1957
- 1980: George D. Snell, Faculty of Arts and Sciences 1933–1934
- 1986: Stanley Cohen, Faculty of Arts and Sciences 1953–1959
- 1986: Rita Levi-Montalcini (1909–2012), Faculty of Arts and Sciences, 1948–1977
- 1992: Edwin G. Krebs, M.D. 43, Resident in Internal Medicine and then a Research Fellow in Biological Chemistry 1945–1948
- 1998: Robert F. Furchgott, Ph.D. Faculty of Medicine, 1949–1956
- 2020: Charles M. Rice, Ph.D. Faculty of Medicine, 1986–2001

Chemistry

- 1970: Luis F. Leloir, Faculty of Medicine 1944
- 1980: Paul Berg, Faculty of Medicine 1954–1959
- 2012: Brian Kobilka, Resident in Internal Medicine, 1981–1984

== Notable alumni ==
- Alexis F. Hartmann, MD '21; pediatrician, biochemist and former professor of pediatrics
- Faye Cashatt Lewis, MD '21; first woman to receive an M.D. from Washington University School of Medicine
- Ewald W. Busse, MD '42; psychiatrist and dean of Duke University School of medicine
- Earl Sutherland, MD '42; biochemist and winner of the Nobel Prize in Physiology or Medicine
- Edwin G. Krebs, MD '43; biochemist and winner of the Nobel Prize in Physiology or Medicine
- David W. Talmage, MD '44; immunologist
- Helen Elizabeth Nash, MD, PhD '45; pediatrician; dean of minority affairs at Washington University School of Medicine
- Ernst Wynder, MD '50; linked smoking with lung cancer
- Daniel Nathans, MD '54; microbiologist and winner of the Nobel Prize in Physiology or Medicine and National Medal of Science
- James E. Darnell Jr., MD '55; molecular biologist and winner of the National Medal of Science
- Selna Kaplan, MD '55; pediatric endocrinologist
- Thomas Hornbein, MD '56; mountaineer and chairman of anesthesiology at University of Washington School of Medicine
- Clay Armstrong, MD '60; physiologist and winner of the Albert Lasker Award for Basic Medical Research for describing K+ channels
- Floyd E. Bloom, MD '60; chairman emeritus of neuropharmacology at Scripps Research Institute and editor-in-chief of Science
- Pedro Cuatrecasas, MD '62; inventor of affinity chromatography and winner of the Wolf Prize in Medicine
- C. Garrison Fathman, MD '69; clinical immunologist
- Philip O. Alderson, MD '70; dean of Saint Louis University School of Medicine
- Jonathan Mann, MD '74; head of the World Health Organization global AIDS program
- Susan Kolb, MD '79, medical doctor and author
- Dan R. Littman, MD, PhD '80; immunologist, HHMI investigator, member of the National Academy of Sciences and the Institute of Medicine
- Robert B. Darnell, MD, PhD '85; neuroscientist/neurologist, founding director of the New York Genome Center
- Eric D. Green, MD, PhD '87; director of the NHGRI
- Ingrid Skop, MD, '92, controversial pro-life obstetrician

== Other associated hospitals ==
- St. Louis Children's Hospital
- Alvin J. Siteman Cancer Center
- Barnes-Jewish West County Hospital
- Barnes-Jewish St. Peters Hospital
- Christian Hospital
- Northwest HealthCare
- Missouri Baptist Medical Center
- St. Louis Shriner's Hospital

== See also ==
- Washington Manual of Medical Therapeutics
