= Philip O. Alderson =

American academic

Philip O. Alderson, M.D. served as Dean of Saint Louis University School of Medicine from 2008 through 2016 and as vice-president for Medical Affairs from 2009 through 2016. He was succeeded in both of these roles by Kevin Behrns, M.D. on January 1, 2017. He was formerly James Picker Professor and Chairman of the Department of Radiology at the Columbia University College of Physicians and Surgeons, Radiologist-in-Chief at NewYork-Presbyterian Hospital/Columbia University Medical Center and President of the Medical Board at New York-Presbyterian. Alderson currently ( 2020 ) is chair of the Board of Directors of Casa de Salud St Louis, a nonprofit organization providing medical and mental health care to immigrants and the underserved in the St Louis region.

Alderson is a graduate of Washington University in St. Louis and Washington University School of Medicine.

Alderson's past work focused on applications of radioactive tracers to cardiac and pulmonary disorders. Current interests include health care reform, big data analytics, genomic medicine and structural biology. He is former President of the Society of Chairmen of Academic Radiology Departments, the Association of University Radiologists, the Association of Residency Program Directors in Radiology, the Academy of Radiology Research, the Fleischner Society, the American Roentgen Ray Society and the American Board of Radiology. He is a former vice-president of the American College of Radiology and the Society of Nuclear Medicine, and served on the Advisory Council of the NIH—National Institute of Biomedical Imaging and Bioengineering. He also served on the NIH Council of Councils and is Chair of the Advisory Committee on Medical Uses of Isotopes of the United States Nuclear Regulatory Commission ( 2015 - 2018 ). He was on sabbatical at the NIH (January - June 2017 ) and subsequently returned to Saint Louis University as Dean Emeritus.
