= Məzrəli =

Məzrəli may refer to:

- Məzrəli, Imishli, Azerbaijan
- Məzrəli, Saatly, Azerbaijan
