= Jean-Baptiste Migeon =

French politician

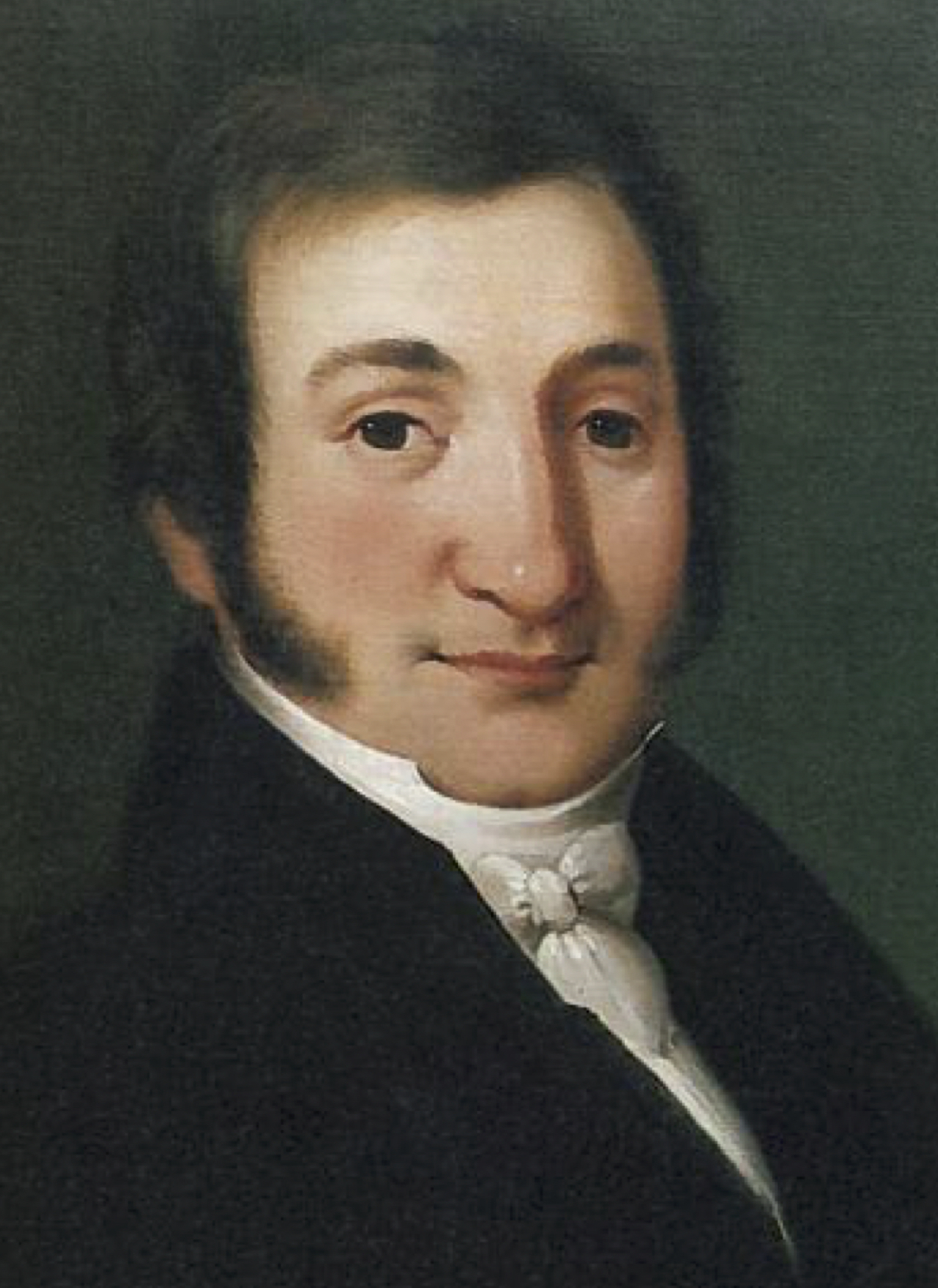
- Born: 15 October 1768; Braux, Ardennes, France
- Died: 28 December 1845 (aged 77); Paris, France
- Occupation(s): Businessman, politician
- Children: Jules Migeon
- Parent(s): François Viellard-Migeon (son-in-law); Mary Frances Schervier (granddaughter)

Jean-Baptiste Migeon (1768-1845) was a French businessman and politician. He served in the Chamber of Deputies from 1827 to 1831, where he represented Haut-Rhin.

== Early life ==
Jean-Baptiste Migeon was born on 15 October 1768 in Braux, France.

== Career ==
Migeon was an ironmaster. He served as the mayor of Mézières. He served in the Chamber of Deputies from 1827 to 1831, where he represented Haut-Rhin.

== Death ==
Migeon died on 28 December 1845 in Paris.
