= François Viellard-Migeon =

French politician

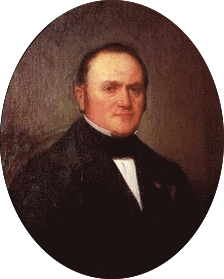
- François Viellard-Migeon.
- Born: François-Christophe-Nicolas-Juvénal Viellard-Migeon; 21 November 1803; Belfort, Haut-Rhin, France
- Died: 2 October 1886 (aged 82); Giromagny, Haut-Rhin, France
- Occupation: Politician
- Children: Armand Viellard-Migeon
- Relatives: Jean-Baptiste Migeon (father-in-law)

François Viellard-Migeon (1803-1886) was a French politician. He served in the Corps législatif from 1869 to 1870, and in the French Senate from 1876 to 1886.

== Early life ==
François Viellard-Migeon was born on 21 November 1803 in Belfort, Haut-Rhin, France.

== Career ==
Viellard-Migeon was an ironmaster in Morvillars. He served in the Corps législatif from 1869 to 1870, and in the French Senate from 1876 to 1886.

== Death ==
Vieillard-Migeon died on 2 October 1886 in Giromagny, Haut-Rhin, France.
