= Məzrə, Jabrayil =

Məzrə
- Location within Azerbaijan
- Coordinates: 39°19′N 47°06′E
- Country: Azerbaijan
- District: Jabrayil

Population
  - Total: 0
- Time zone: UTC+4 (AZT)
  - Summer (DST): UTC+5 (AZT)

Məzrə (Mazra) is a village in the Jabrayil District of Azerbaijan. It is currently uninhabited.
