= Mazar, Markazi =

Village in Markazi, Iran

Mazar مزارع
- Village
- Location within Iran
- Coordinates: 33°45′36″N 49°56′45″E
- Country: Iran
- Province: Markazi
- County: Khomeyn
- Bakhsh: Kamareh
- Rural District: Khorram Dasht

Population (2006)
  - Total: 35
- Time zone: UTC+3:30 (IRST)
  - Summer (DST): UTC+4:30 (IRDT)

Mazar (Persian: مزارع, also Romanized as Mazārʿ; also known as Mazrā‘, Mazrā‘-e Darreh Shūr, Mazra‘eh, and Mirza) is a village in Khorram Dasht Rural District, Kamareh District, Khomeyn County, Markazi Province, Iran. At the 2006 census, its population was 35, in 9 families.
