= Məzrə, Babek =

Məzrə
- Municipality
- Location within Azerbaijan
- Coordinates: 39°18′27″N 45°27′33″E
- Country: Azerbaijan
- Autonomous republic: Nakhchivan
- District: Babek

Population (2005)
  - Total: 855
- Time zone: UTC+4 (AZT)

Məzrə (also, Mazra, Mezre, until 2003, Alagözməzrə and Alagëzmazra) is a village and municipality in the Babek District of Nakhchivan, Azerbaijan. It is located 16 km in the north from the district center, on the left bank of the Nakhchivanchay River. Its population is busy with grain-growing, vegetable-growing, vine-growing, poultry and animal husbandry. There are secondary school, club, library, mosque and a medical center in the village. It has a population of 855.

== Etymology ==
In the scientific literature this name is explained as Alagözməzrə. The name was made with components of Alagöz (it is related with same named mountain in the area) and Məzrə (in Arabian language "Arable", "field") means "arable at the foot of Alagöz Mountain ".
