= Pediatric endocrinology =

Medical subspecialty

Pediatric endocrinology (British: Paediatric) is a medical subspecialty dealing with disorders of the endocrine glands, such as variations of physical growth and sexual development in childhood, diabetes and many more.

By age, pediatric endocrinologists, depending upon the age range of the patients they treat, care for patients from infancy to late adolescence and young adulthood.

The most common disease of the specialty is type 1 diabetes, which usually accounts for at least 50% of a typical clinical practice. The next most common problem is growth disorders, especially those amenable to growth hormone treatment. Pediatric endocrinologists are usually the primary physicians involved in the medical care of infants and children with intersex disorders. The specialty also deals with hypoglycemia and other forms of hyperglycemia in childhood, variations of puberty, as well other adrenal, thyroid, and pituitary problems. Many pediatric endocrinologists have interests and expertise in bone metabolism, lipid metabolism, adolescent gynecology, or inborn errors of metabolism.

Most pediatric endocrinologists in North America and many from around the world can trace their professional genealogy to Lawson Wilkins, who pioneered the specialty in the pediatrics department of Johns Hopkins School of Medicine and the Harriet Lane Home in Baltimore between the late 1940s and the mid-1960s.

== Professional training ==
In the United States and Canada, pediatric endocrinology is a subspecialty of the American Board of Pediatrics or the American Osteopathic Board of Pediatrics, with board certification following fellowship training. It is a relatively small and primarily cognitive specialty, with few procedures and an emphasis on diagnostic evaluation.

Training for pediatric endocrinology consists of a 3-year fellowship following completion of a 3-year pediatrics residency. The fellowship, and the specialty, are heavily research-oriented and academically based, although less exclusively now than in past decades.

== Professional organizations ==
The principal North American professional association was originally named the Lawson Wilkins Pediatric Endocrine Society, now renamed the Pediatric Endocrine Society. Other longstanding pediatric endocrine associations include the European Society for Paediatric Endocrinology, the British Society for Paediatric Endocrinology, the Australasian Paediatric Endocrine Group and the Japanese Society for Pediatric Endocrinology. Professional associations of the specialty continue to proliferate.

== Controversial treatment guidelines ==
In 2021, the Pediatric Endocrine Society offered updated recommendations for use of growth-promoting hormone therapy and related medications in children. The Guidelines for Growth Hormone and Insulin-Like Growth Factor-1 Treatment in Children and Adolescents were updated from 2003 and reflect the continuing controversy over how to diagnose, categorize and treat growth failure in children. The guideline was developed following the GRADE approach (Grading of Recommendations, Assessment, Development, and Evaluation).

In 2021, the Pediatric Endocrine Society released a position statement in support of Gender Affirming Care (GAC). In it the society states, "Puberty suppression and/or gender-affirming hormone therapy is recommended within this evidence-based approach on a case-by-case basis as medically necessary and is potentially lifesaving." This position is at odds with the position of England's National Health Service (NHS) which maintains that evidence for puberty blockers and hormone treatment for gender transition wholly is inadequate, and has decided to stop routine prescribing of puberty blockers.

== See also ==
- Robert Lustig, an American pediatric endocrinologist
- Melvin Grumbach, an American pediatric endocrinologist
