= Méziré =

- Commune
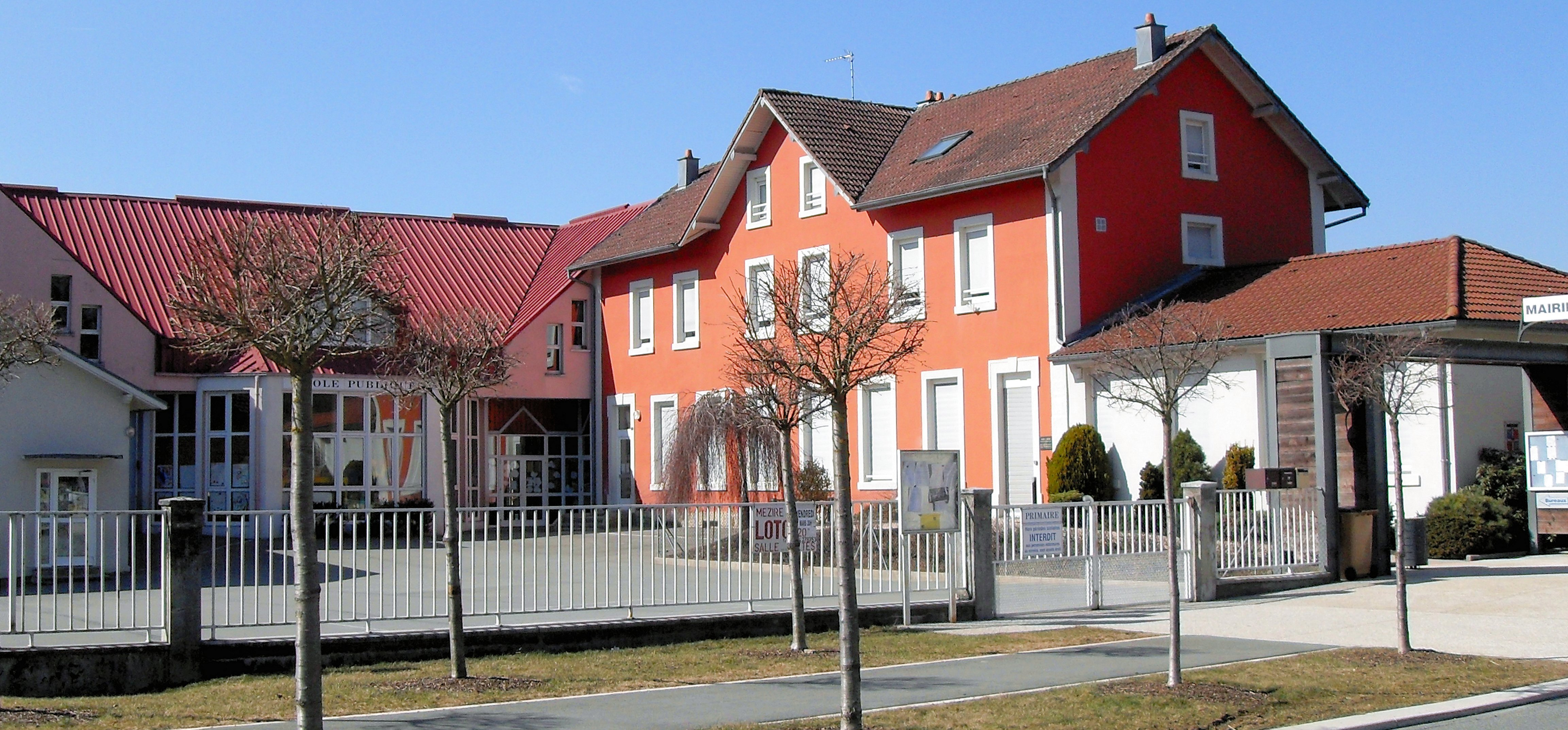
- Town hall and school

- Coat of arms
- Location of Méziré
- Location within France Location within Bourgogne-Franche-Comté
- Coordinates: 47°31′55″N 6°55′14″E
- Country: France
- Region: Bourgogne-Franche-Comté
- Department: Territoire de Belfort
- Arrondissement: Belfort
- Canton: Grandvillars
- Intercommunality: Grand Belfort

Government
  - Mayor (2020–2026): Rafaël Rodriguez
- Area^{1}: 3.91 km^{2} (1.51 sq mi)
- Highest elevation: 395 m (1,296 ft)
- Lowest elevation: 324 m (1,063 ft)
- Population (2023): 1,255
  - Density: 321/km^{2} (831/sq mi)
- Time zone: UTC+01:00 (CET)
  - Summer (DST): UTC+02:00 (CEST)
- INSEE/Postal code: 90069 /90120
- ^{1} French Land Register data, which excludes lakes, ponds, glaciers > 1 km^{2} (0.386 sq mi or 247 acres) and river estuaries.

Méziré (French pronunciation: [meziʁe]) is a commune in the Territoire de Belfort department in Bourgogne-Franche-Comté in northeastern France.

== See also ==
- Communes of the Territoire de Belfort department
