= Məzrə, Qubadli =

Məzrə
- Location within Azerbaijan
- Coordinates: 39°24′30″N 46°24′38″E
- Country: Azerbaijan
- Rayon: Qubadli
- Time zone: UTC+4 (AZT)
  - Summer (DST): UTC+5 (AZT)

Məzrə is a village in the Qubadli Rayon of Azerbaijan.
