= Pokr Masrik =

Village in Gegharkunik, Armenia

Pokr Masrik Փոքր Մասրիկ
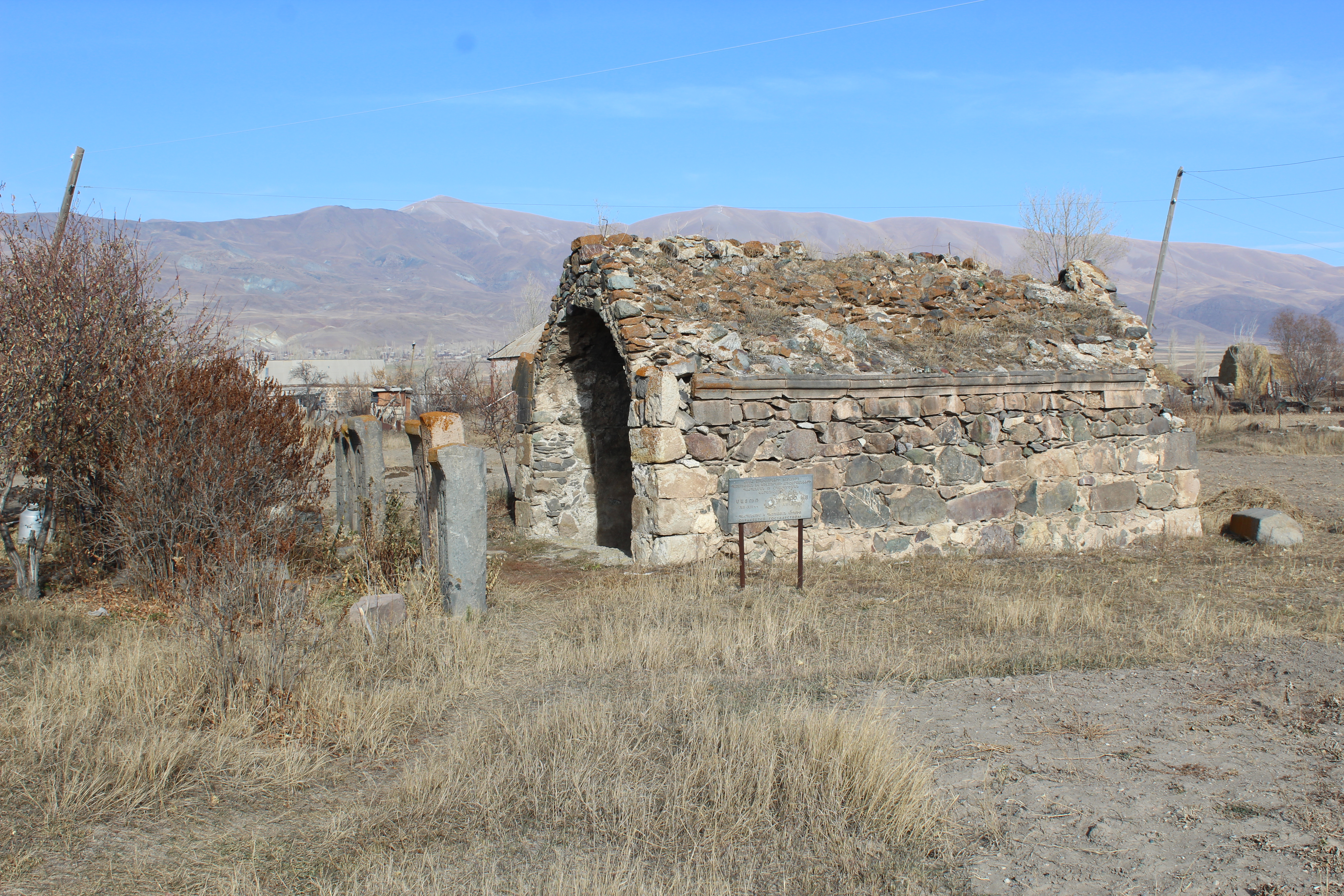
- St. Nshan chapel in Pokr Masrik

- Location within Armenia Location within Gegharkunik
- Coordinates: 40°15′29″N 45°43′21″E
- Country: Armenia
- Province: Gegharkunik
- Municipality: Vardenis

Population (2011)
  - Total: 626
- Time zone: UTC+4 (AMT)

Pokr Masrik (Armenian: Փոքր Մասրիկ) is a village in the Vardenis Municipality of the Gegharkunik Province of Armenia. Azerbaijanis lived in the village prior to their exodus from Armenia after the outbreak of the Nagorno-Karabakh conflict. From 1988 and onward, Armenian refugees from Azerbaijan settled in the village. The village is located close to Mets Masrik (lit. 'Big Masrik').

== History ==
The village has a 12th-century church.

== Demographics ==
The population of the town consisted of 227 Muslims in 1831 rising to 1,200 in 1897 and to 1,375 by 1916.

== Gallery ==
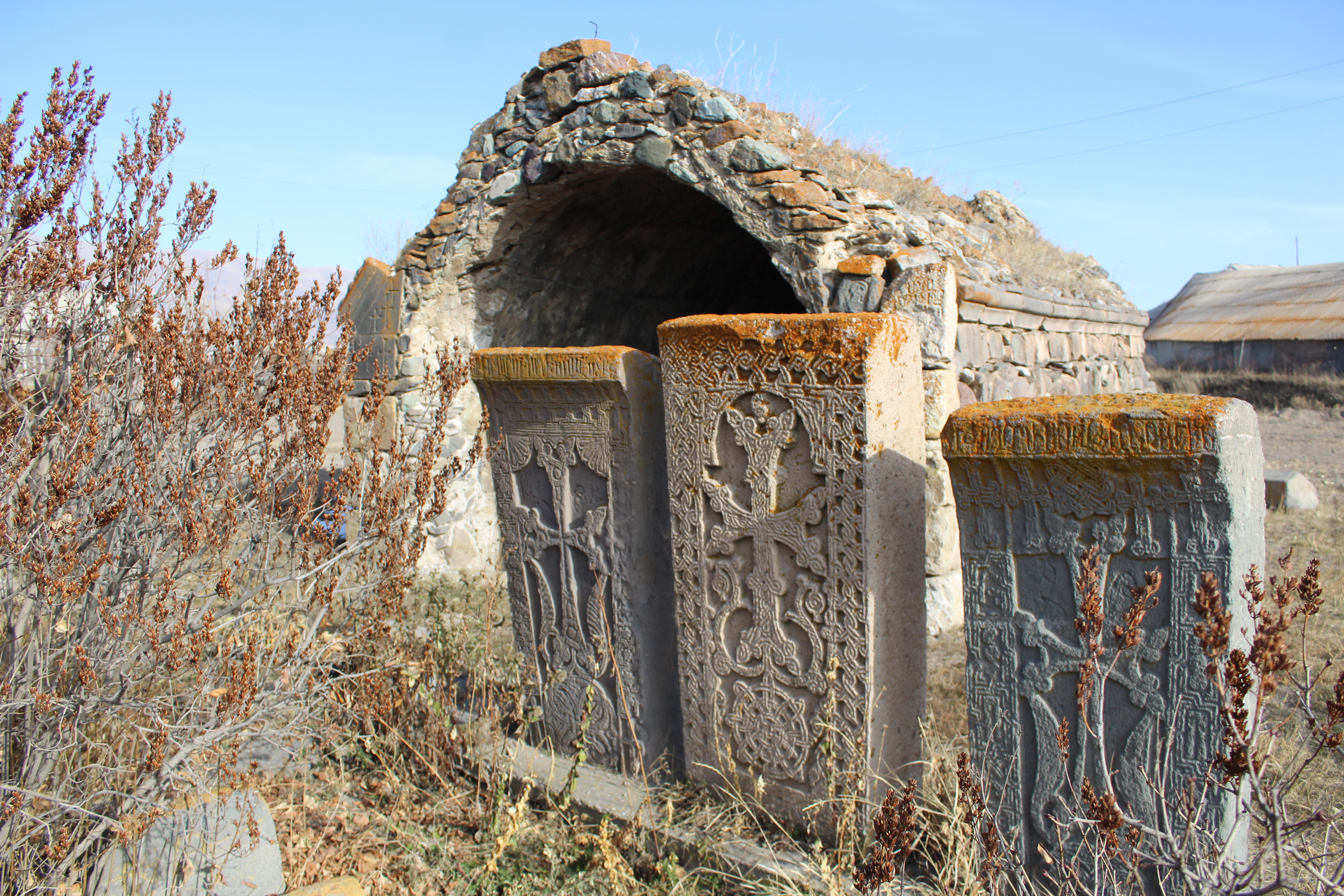
St. Nshan chapel and khachkars

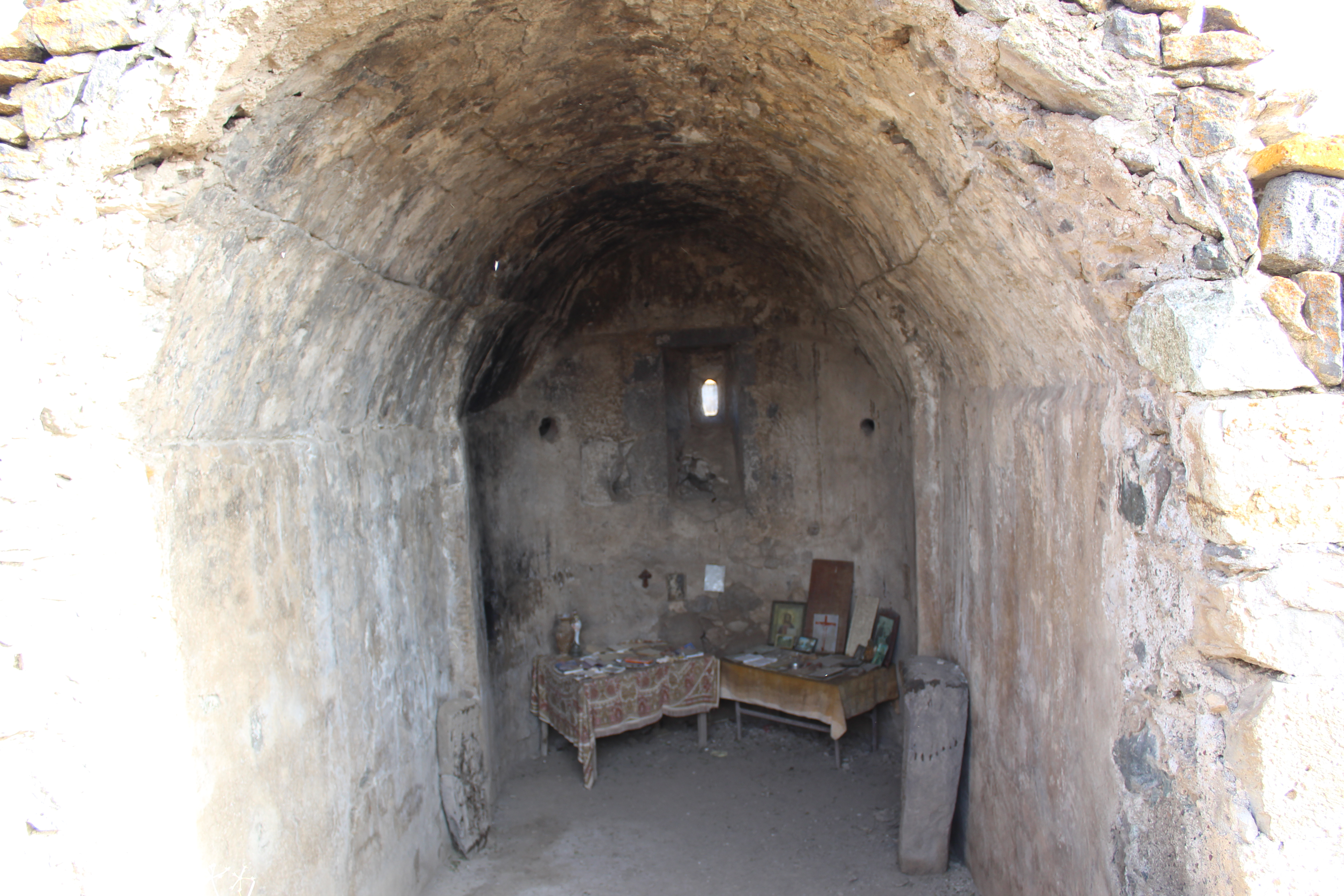
St. Nshan chapel interior
