= Mets Masrik =

Village in Gegharkunik, Armenia

Mets Masrik Մեծ Մասրիկ
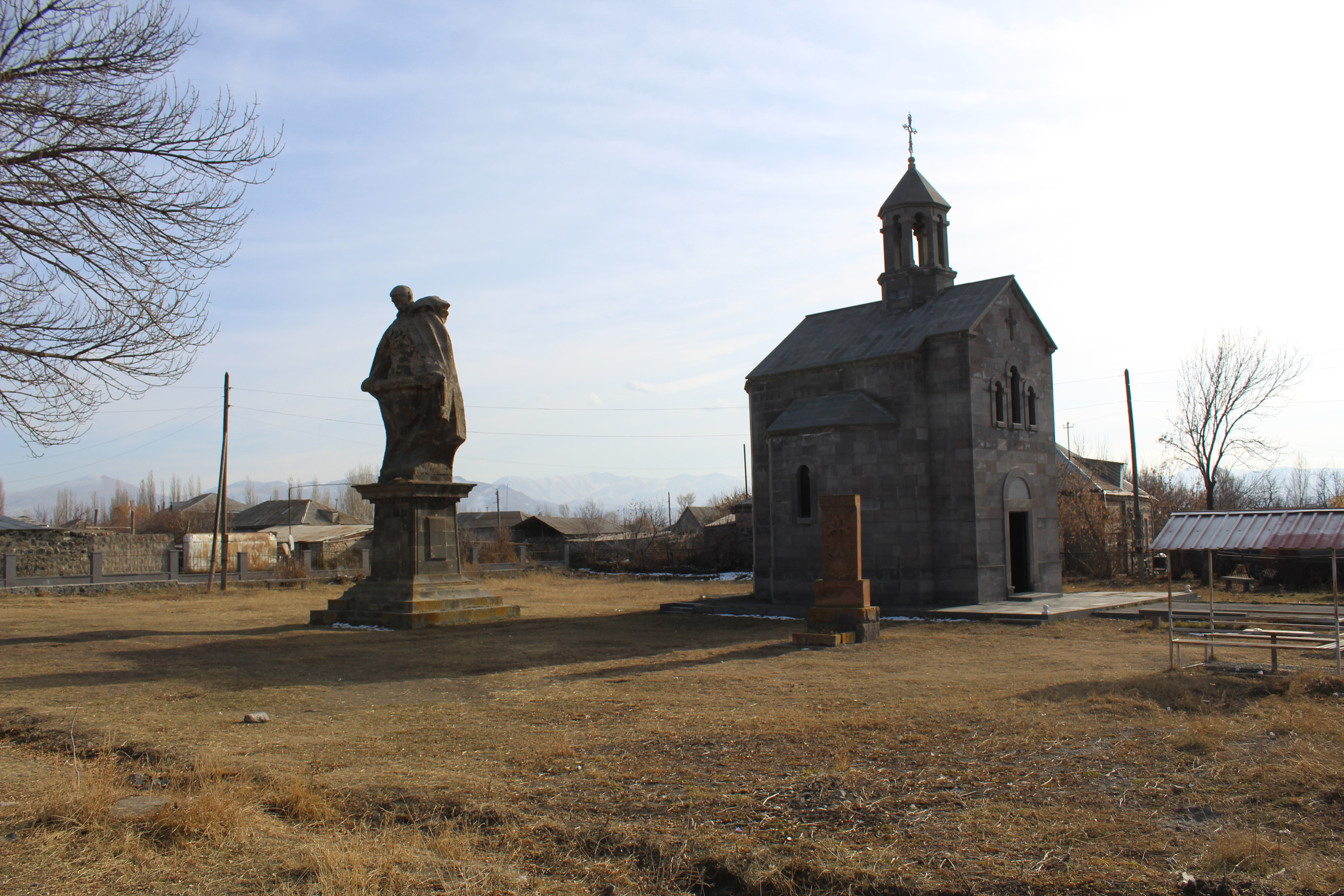
- Church in Mets Masrik

- Location within Armenia Location within Gegharkunik
- Coordinates: 40°13′07″N 45°46′10″E
- Country: Armenia
- Province: Gegharkunik
- Municipality: Vardenis

Area
  - Total: 2.8 km^{2} (1.1 sq mi)

Population (2019)
  - Total: 2,699
- Time zone: UTC+4 (AMT)

Mets Masrik (Armenian: Մեծ Մասրիկ) is a village in the Vardenis Municipality of the Gegharkunik Province of Armenia. The village is located close to Pokr Masrik (lit. 'little Masrik').

== History ==
The town has been inhabited since the 7th century and has a khachkar dated 881, two shrines from the 12th and 13th centuries, and a 17th-century church.

== Demographics ==
The village had 3,132 inhabitants in 2011.

== Climate ==
Climate data for Masrik, 1991-2020
Month	Jan	Feb	Mar	Apr	May	Jun	Jul	Aug	Sep	Oct	Nov	Dec	Year
Record high °C (°F)	9.8 (49.6)	10.5 (50.9)	18.6 (65.5)	25.0 (77.0)	29.5 (85.1)	31.3 (88.3)	35.2 (95.4)	34.5 (94.1)	31.5 (88.7)	25.0 (77.0)	19.2 (66.6)	15.6 (60.1)	35.2 (95.4)
Daily mean °C (°F)	−8.3 (17.1)	−7.2 (19.0)	−1.4 (29.5)	4.9 (40.8)	9.5 (49.1)	13.9 (57.0)	16.9 (62.4)	17.2 (63.0)	13.5 (56.3)	7.9 (46.2)	0.5 (32.9)	−5.4 (22.3)	5.2 (41.3)
Record low °C (°F)	−31.0 (−23.8)	−31.2 (−24.2)	−27.2 (−17.0)	−23.3 (−9.9)	−7.9 (17.8)	−1.8 (28.8)	0.0 (32.0)	1.4 (34.5)	−6.5 (20.3)	−10.0 (14.0)	−24.6 (−12.3)	−26.8 (−16.2)	−31.2 (−24.2)
Average precipitation mm (inches)	19.7 (0.78)	21.1 (0.83)	33.8 (1.33)	47.4 (1.87)	64.0 (2.52)	73.6 (2.90)	45.4 (1.79)	35.7 (1.41)	37.2 (1.46)	43.1 (1.70)	30.3 (1.19)	24.9 (0.98)	476.2 (18.76)
Average precipitation days (≥ 1 mm)	5	5.1	7	8.7	12.1	9.8	6.5	5.4	5.2	6.5	5.4	5.3	82
Average relative humidity (%)	71.8	70.7	68.5	65.9	65.4	64.4	62.8	61.5	62.9	66.6	70.2	72.3	66.9
Source: NOAA

== Gallery ==
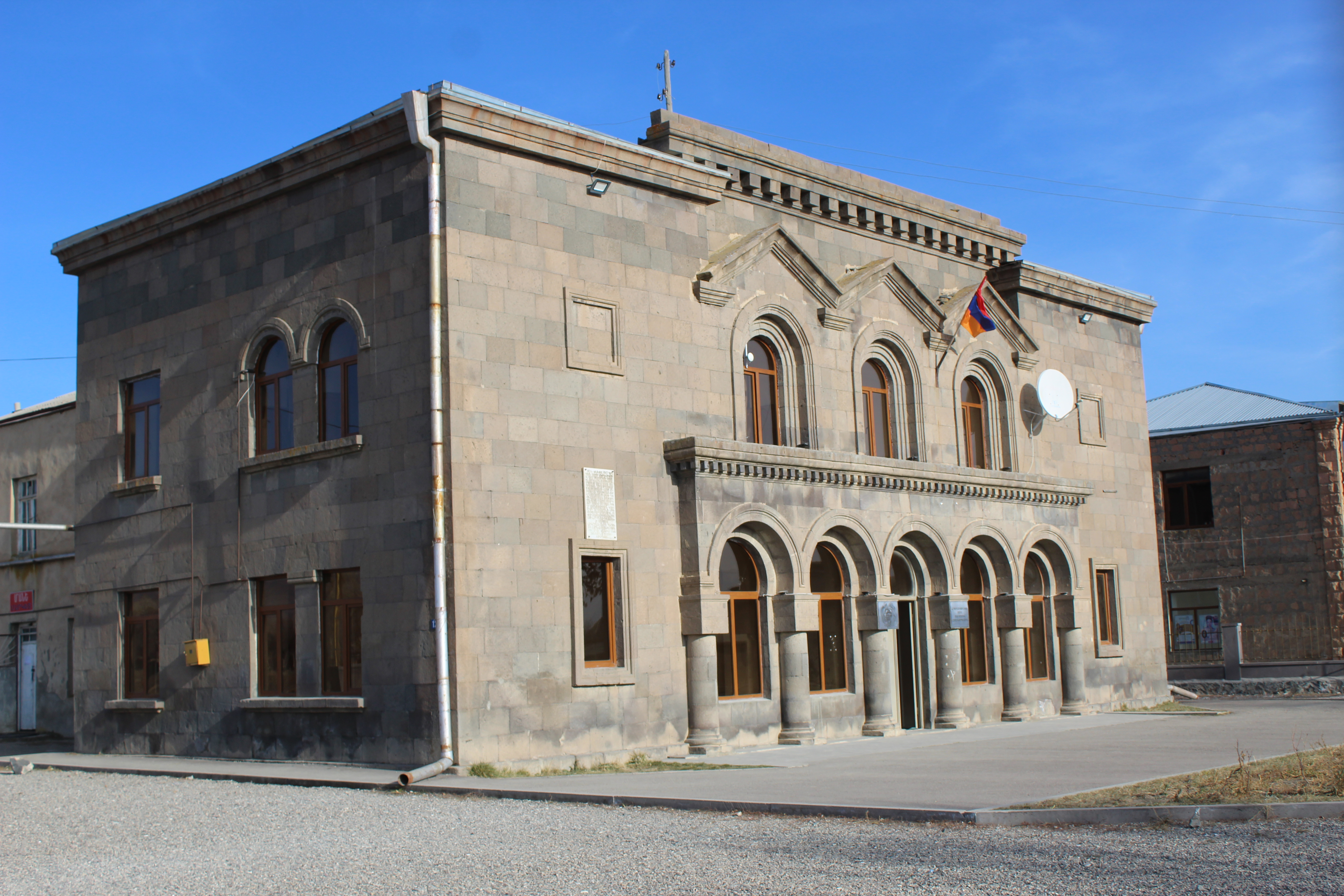
House of Culture

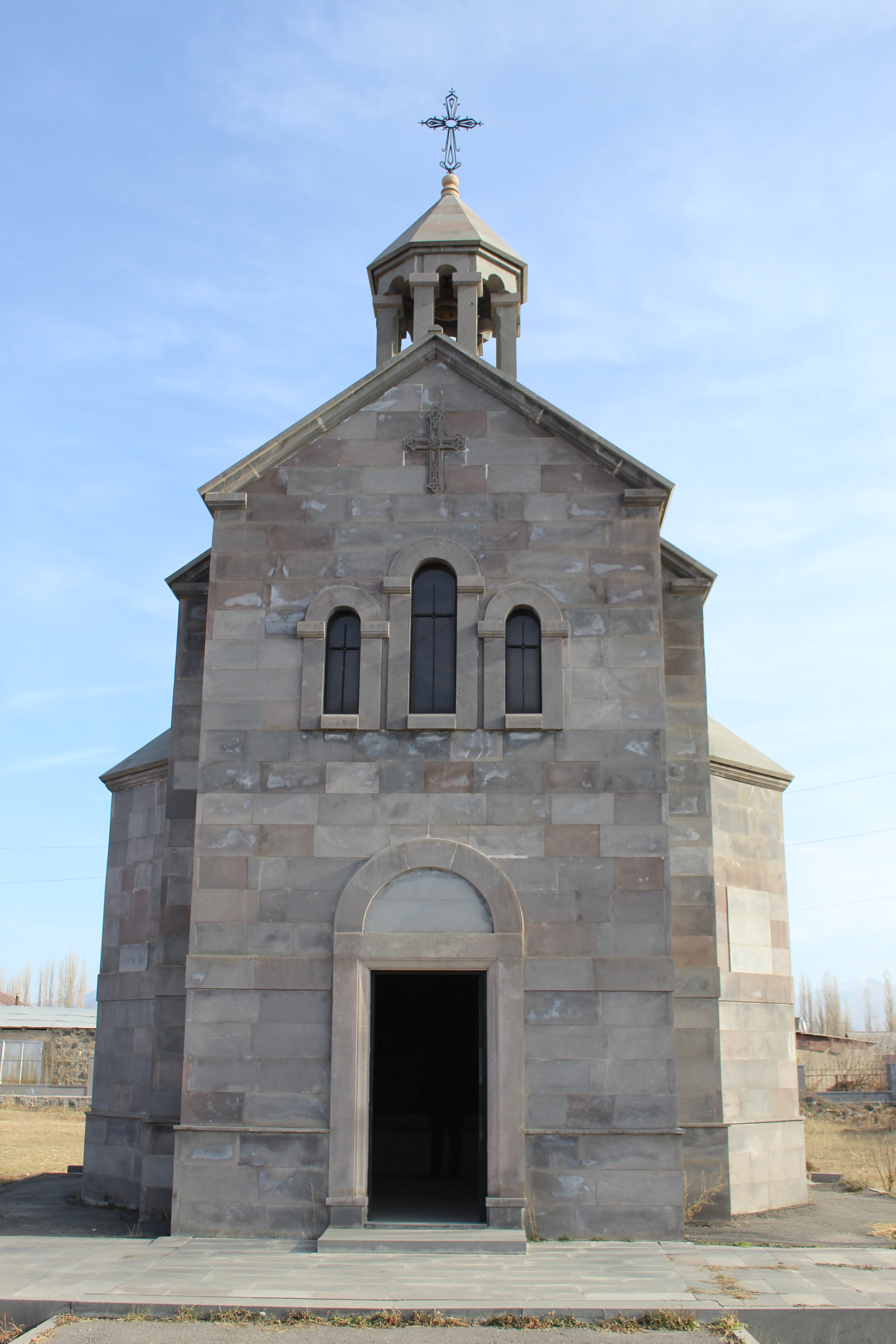
Church in Mets Masrik

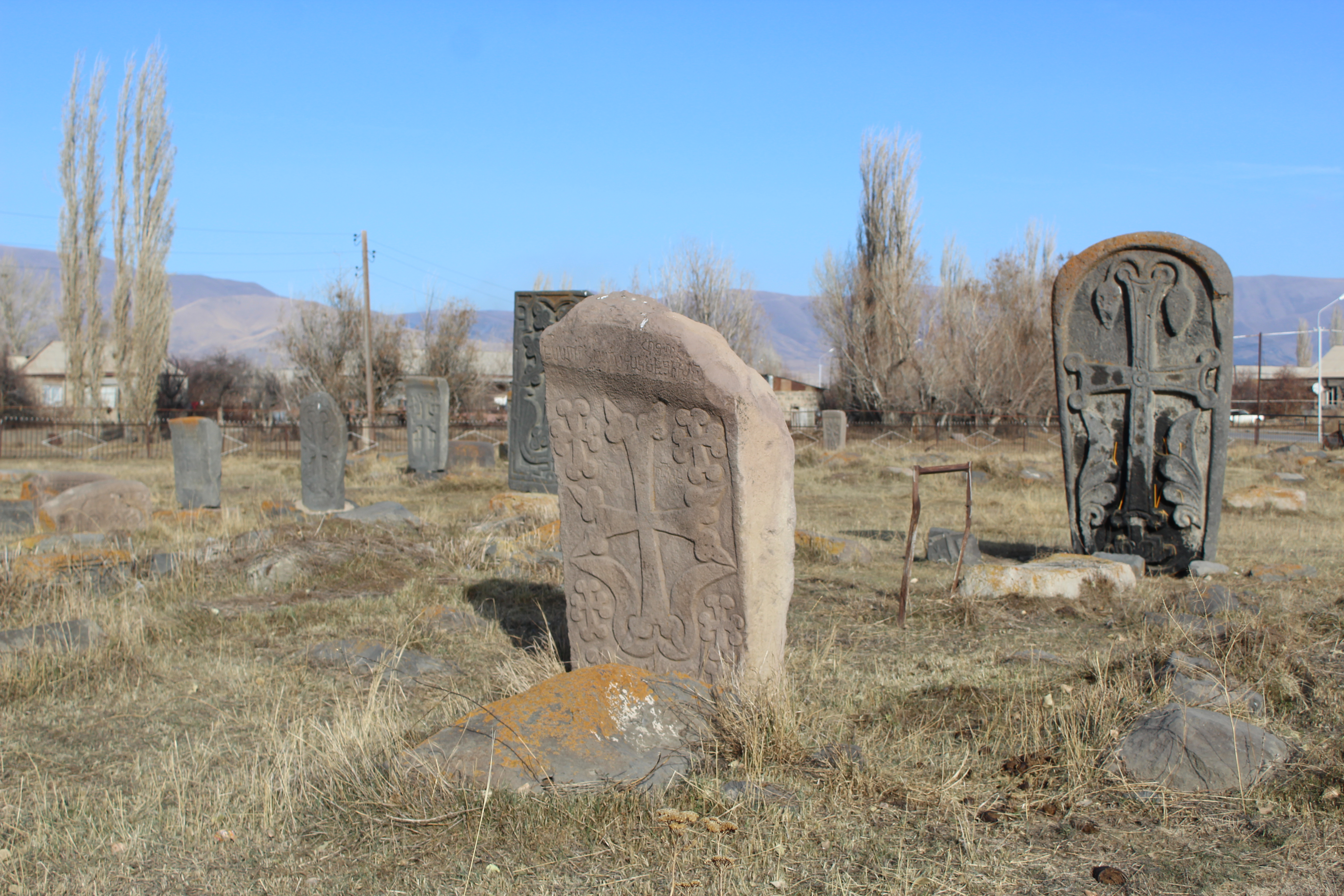
Khachkars in Mets Masrik

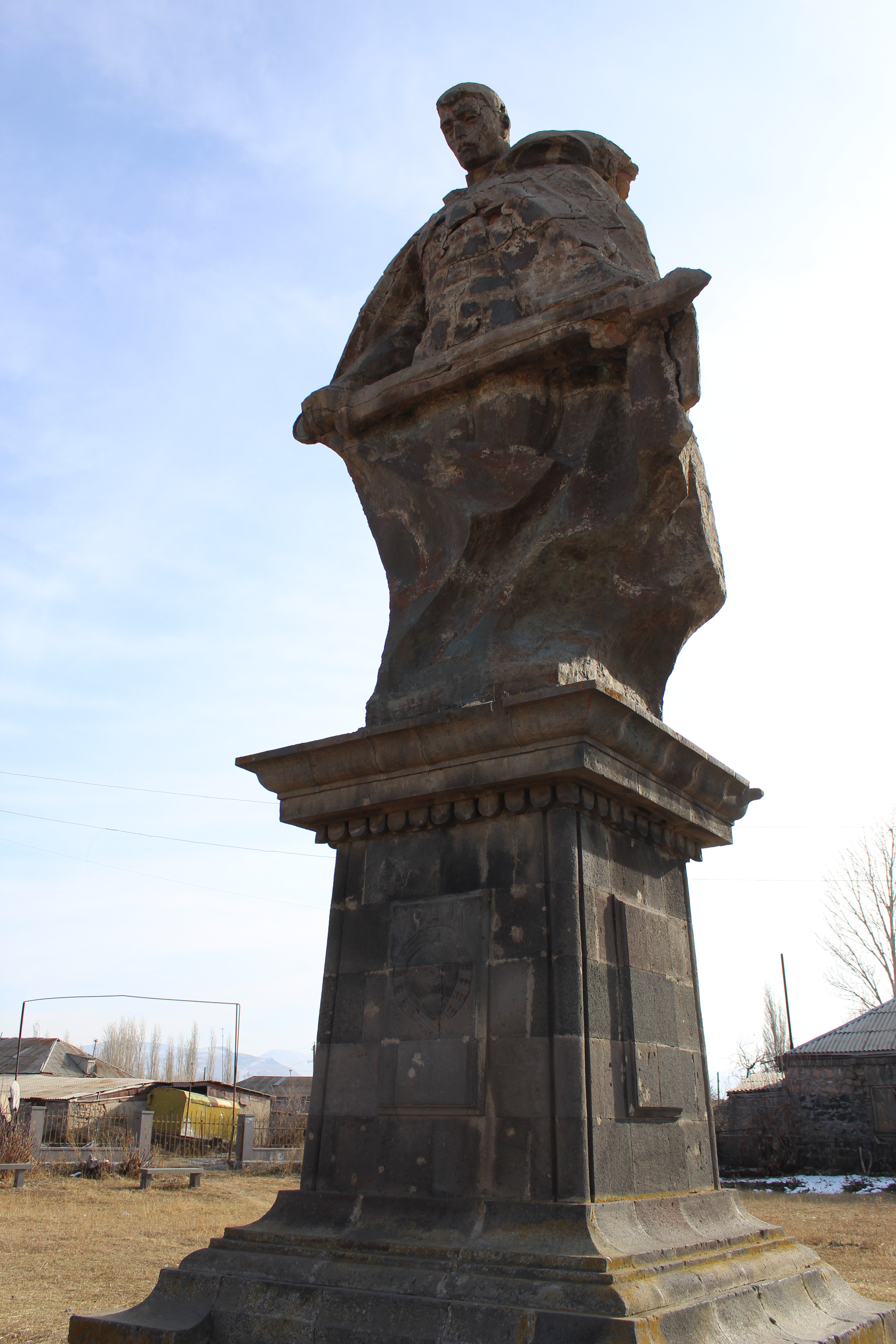
WWII monument

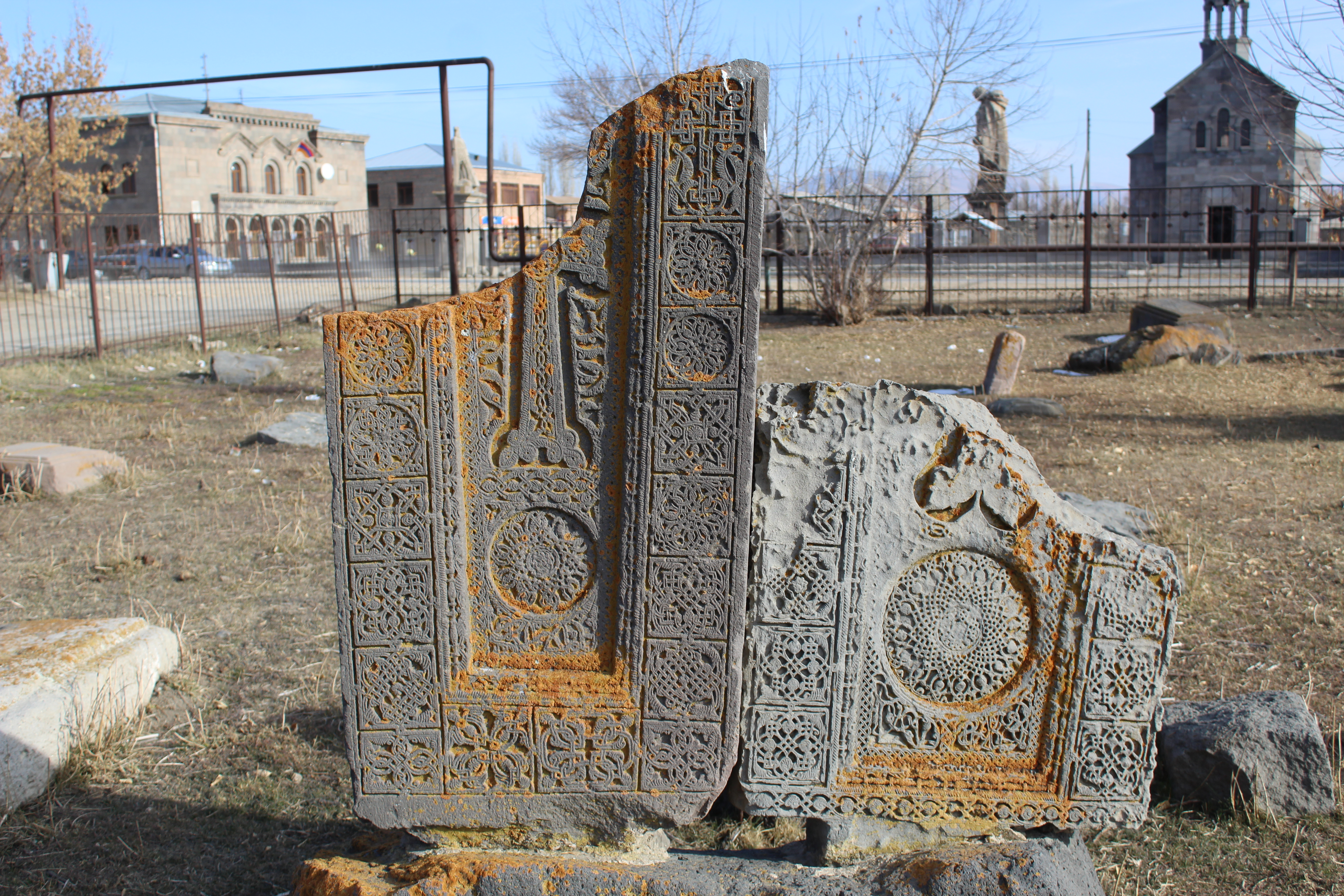
Khachkars in Mets Masrik

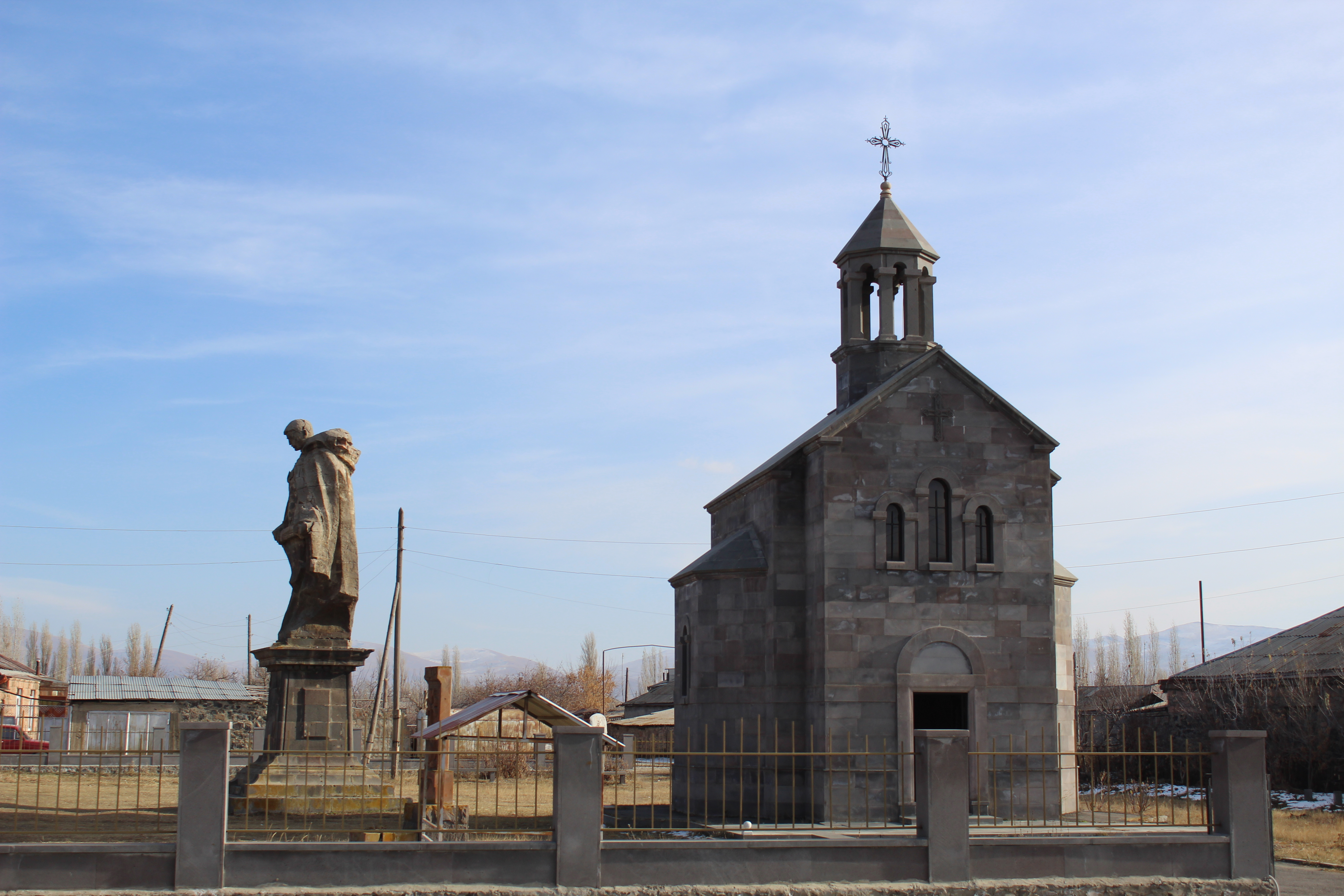
Church in Mets Masrik

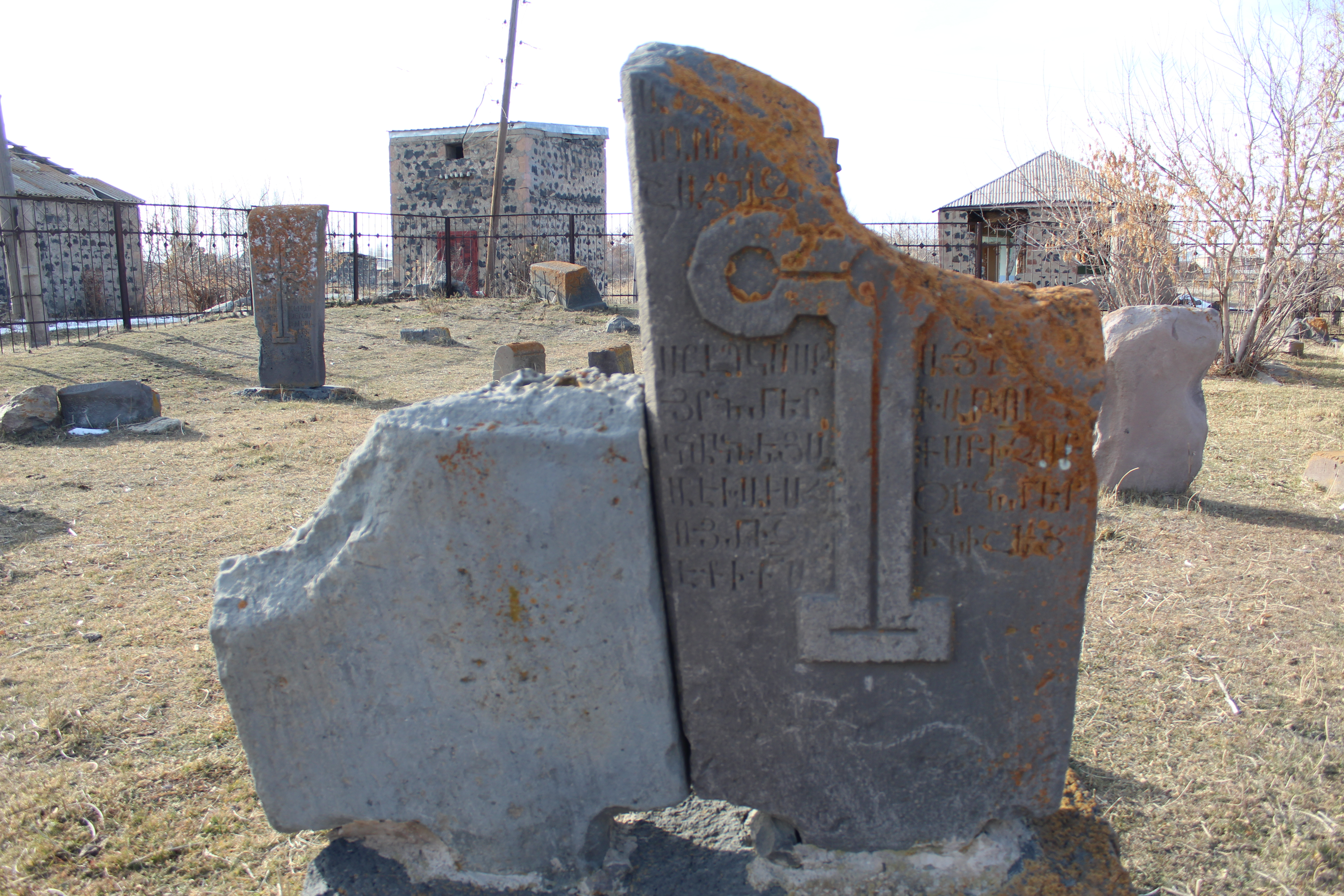
Khachkars in Mets Masrik
