= Lawson Wilkins =

American endocrinologist (1894–1963)

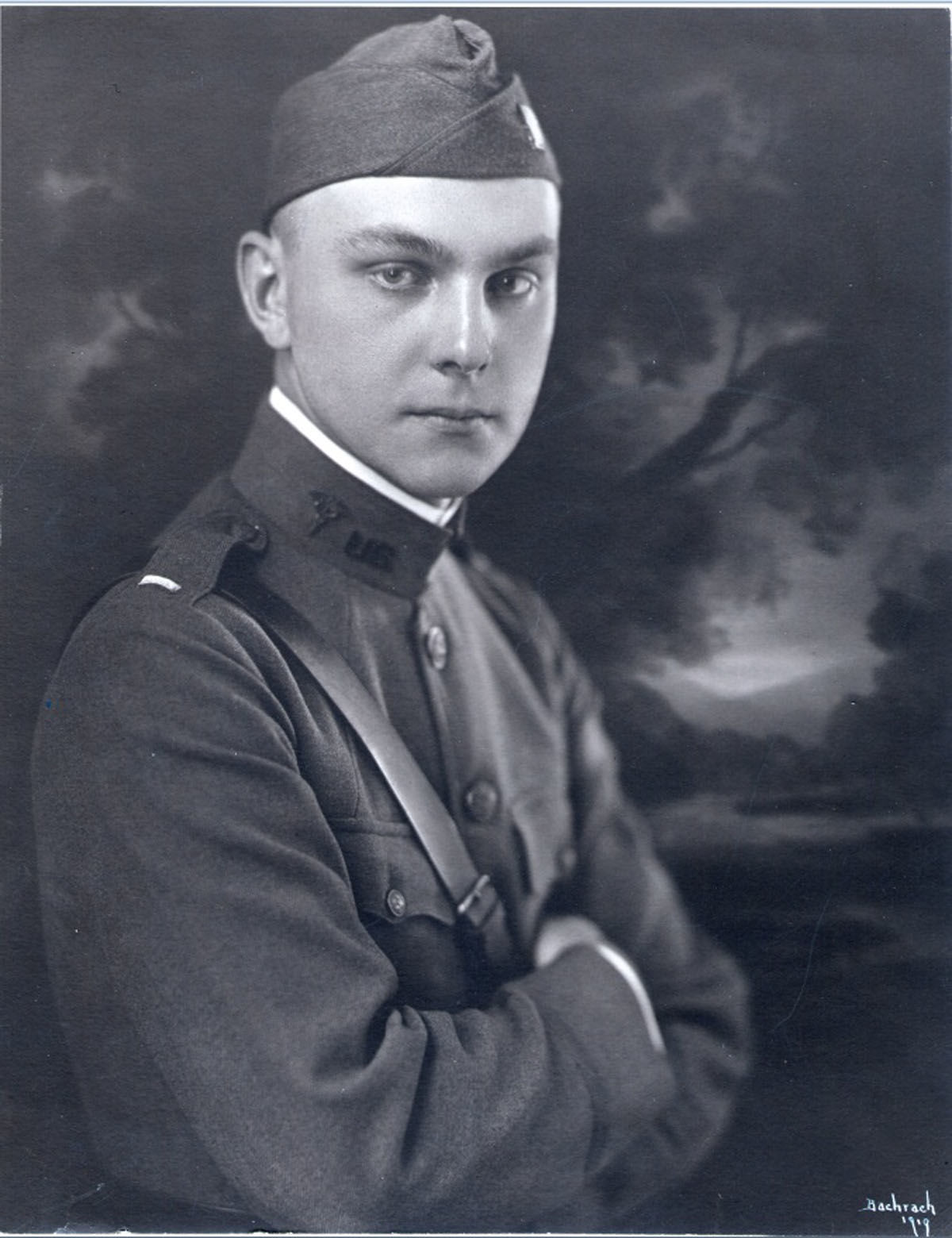
- Lawson Wilikins as a young soldier, ca. 1919
- Born: March 6, 1894; Baltimore, Maryland
- Died: September 27, 1963 (aged 69)
- Education: Johns Hopkins School of Medicine
- Occupation: pediatric endocrinologist
- Parent: George Wilkins
- Awards: John Howland Award (1963)

Lawson Wilkins (March 6, 1894 – September 27, 1963) was an American pediatric endocrinologist. He is known along with John Money for pioneering surgeries for visibly intersex newborns. At the time, intersex anatomy was understood virtually exclusively as a birth defect as opposed to a nonpathological anatomical variation. Physicians who trained under Wilkins would later go on to found the Pediatric Endocrine Society, with the society's name originally including a tribute to him.

== Biography ==
Lawson Wilkins was born on March 6, 1894 in Baltimore, Maryland. His father was also a physician. After completing his service in World War I, he studied at the Johns Hopkins School of Medicine. He completed his pediatric residency at Yale University before returning to practice in his hometown of Baltimore.

== Honors ==
- Borden Award, American Academy of Pediatrics (1953)
- Amory Prize, American Academy of Arts and Sciences (1955)
- Koch Award, Endocrine Society (1961)
- John Howland Award, American Pediatric Society (1963)
