= E. Mead Johnson Award =

Award in pediatric research

The E. Mead Johnson Award, given by the Society for Pediatric Research, was established in 1939 to honor clinical and laboratory research achievements in pediatrics. The awards are funded by Mead Johnson Nutritionals, a subsidiary of Reckitt Benckiser and are named after Edward Mead Johnson, a co-founder of the originating company Johnson & Johnson. Two researchers sometimes share a prize.

== Award recipients ==
- 1939 Frederic A. Gibbs, Dorothy Hansine Andersen
- 1940 Robert E. Gross, Lee E. Farr
- 1941 René J. Dubos, Albert Sabin
- 1942 David Bodian and Howard A. Howe, Harold E. Harrison and Helen C. Harrison
- 1943 Hattie E. Alexander, Philip Levine
- 1944 Fuller Albright, Josef Warkany
- 1945 no awards given
- 1946 Horace L. Hodes, Paul A. Harper
- 1947 Helen B. Taussig, Louis K. Diamond
- 1948 Wolf W. Zuelzer, Benjamin M. Spock
- 1949 Nathan B. Talbot, Henry L. Barnett
- 1950 Charles D. May and Harry Shwachman, Gertrude Henle and Werner Henle
- 1951 William M. Wallace, Victor A. Najjar
- 1952 Seymour S. Cohen, Orvar Swenson and Edward B.D. Neuhauser
- 1953 Frederick C. Robbins and Thomas H. Weller, Margaret H. Smith
- 1954 Robert E. Cooke, Vincent C. Kelley
- 1955 Robert A. Good
- 1956 David Gitlin, Arnall Patz
- 1957 Alfred M. Bongiovanni and Walter R. Eberlein, Albert Dorfman
- 1958 William A. Silverman, Norman Kretchmer
- 1959 C. Henry Kempe, Barton Childs
- 1960 Robert A. Aldrich, Irving Schulman
- 1961 Lytt Irvine Gardner, Donald E. Pickering
- 1962 Park S. Gerald, Robert L. Vernier
- 1963 Daniel Carleton Gajdusek, Richard T. Smith
- 1964 Robert M. Chanock, Abraham M. Rudolph
- 1965 David Y.-Y Hsia, L. Stanley James
- 1966 William H. Tooley, Robert W. Winters
- 1967 Henry Neil Kirkman, Henry M. Meyer and Paul D. Parkman
- 1968 Mary Ellen Avery, Charles R. Scriver
- 1969 Frederick C. Battaglia, Gerard B. Odell
- 1970 Myron Winick, Joseph A. Bellanti
- 1971 Paul G. Quie, Fred S. Rosen
- 1972 Chester M. Edelmann, Frank A. Oski
- 1973 Henry L. Nadler, James G. White
- 1974 Andre J. Nahmias, E. Richard Stiehm
- 1975 John B. Robbins and David H. Smith, Rawle M. McIntosh
- 1976 Haig H. Kazazian, David Lawrence Rimoin
- 1977 Arthur J. Ammann, Michael E. Miller
- 1978 Samuel A. Latt, Pearay L. Ogra
- 1979 Philip L. Ballard, Harvey R. Colten
- 1980 R. Michael Blaese, S. Michael Mauer
- 1981 Robert J. Desnick, Erwin W. Gelfand
- 1982 Larry J. Shapiro, Jerry A. Winkelstein
- 1983 Laurence A. Boxer, Samuel E. Lux
- 1984 Jan L. Breslow, John A. Phillips
- 1985 Russell W. Chesney, Augustine Joseph D'Ercole
- 1986 Raif Salim Geha, Alan H. Jobe
- 1987 Donald C. Anderson, Stuart H. Orkin
- 1988 Jeffrey A. Whitsett, Barry Wolf
- 1989 Steven M. Reppert, Robert H. Yolken
- 1990 Gregory A. Grabowski, Arnold W. Strauss
- 1991 Louis M. Kunkel, Ronald G. Worton
- 1992 Ann Margaret Arvin, Francis S. Collins and Lap-Chee Tsui
- 1993 Edward R.B. McCabe, Alan L. Schwartz
- 1994 David A. Williams, David H. Perlmutter
- 1995 Margaret K. Hostetter, Alan M. Krensky
- 1996 Perrin C. White, Huda Y. Zoghbi
- 1997 Donald Y.M. Leung, Elaine Tuomanen
- 1998 Jonathan D. Gitlin, James R. Lupski, Jeffrey C. Murray
- 1999 Steven H. Abman and Chaim M. Roifman
- 2000 Mark A. Kay and Gregg L. Semenza
- 2001 Alan D. D'Andrea, Steve A.N. Goldstein
- 2002 Nancy C. Andrews, Markus Grompe
- 2003 Gregory S. Barsh, Val C. Sheffield
- 2004 Bruce D. Gelb, Friedhelm Hildebrandt
- 2005 Elizabeth C. Engle, Terence R. Flotte
- 2006 James E. Crowe, David Pellman
- 2007 Marc E. Rothenberg, Deepak Srivastava
- 2008 Todd R. Golub, Victor Nizet
- 2009 George Q. Daley, Brendan Lee
- 2010 Jean-Laurent Casanova, Fernando Pedro Polack
- 2011 Joel Hirschhorn, Eric Vilain
- 2012 Scott A. Armstrong, Nicholas Katsanis
- 2013 William T. Pu, Bradley L. Schlaggar
- 2014 Atul Butte, John Vance Williams
- 2015 Ophir Klein, Loren D. Walensky
- 2016 Kimberly Stegmaier, Sing Sing Way
- 2017 Jordan S. Orange
- 2018 Helen Su
- 2019 Joshua D. Milner
- 2021 Sallie Permar
- 2022 Vijay G. Sankaran
- 2023 Audrey Odom John

== See also ==
- List of medicine awards
- List of awards named after people
