= Walensky =

Walensky is a surname. Notable people with the surname include:

- Loren D. Walensky, American physician-scientist
- Rochelle Walensky (born 1969), American physician-scientist

== Fictional ==
- Lisa Walensky, a character in Philly (TV series)
