= Drimmer =

Drimmer is a surname. Notable people with the surname include:

- Debra Drimmer (born c. 1963), American television producer
- Frederick Drimmer (1916–2000), American writer
- John Drimmer, American television producer

== See also ==
- Dimmer (surname)
