= Prevention of Tay–Sachs disease =

For preventing Tay–Sachs disease, three main approaches have been used to prevent or reduce the incidence of Tay–Sachs disease in those who are at high risk:

- Prenatal diagnosis. If both parents are identified as carriers, prenatal genetic testing can determine whether the fetus has inherited a defective copy of the gene from both parents. Couples may be willing to terminate the pregnancy, although abortion may raise ethical issues. Chorionic villus sampling (CVS), which can be performed after the 10th week of gestation, is the most common form of prenatal diagnosis. Both CVS and amniocentesis present developmental risks to the fetus that have to be balanced with the possible benefits, especially in cases where the carrier status of only one parent is known.
- Mate selection. In Orthodox Jewish circles, the organization Dor Yeshorim carries out an anonymous screening program so that couples who are likely to conceive a child with Tay–Sachs or another genetic disorder can avoid marriage. Nomi Stone of Dartmouth College describes this approach: "Orthodox Jewish high school students are given blood tests to determine if they have the Tay–Sachs gene. Instead of receiving direct results as to their carrier status, each person is given a six-digit identification number. Couples can call a hotline, and if both are carriers, they will be deemed 'incompatible.' Individuals are not told they are carriers directly in order to avoid the possibility of stigmatization or discrimination. If the information were released, carriers could potentially become unmarriageable within the community." Anonymous testing eliminates the stigma of carriership while decreasing the rate of homozygosity in this population. Stone notes that this approach, while effective within a confined population such as Hasidic or Orthodox Jews, may not be effective in the general population.
- Preimplantation genetic diagnosis. By retrieving the mother's eggs for in vitro fertilization and conceiving a child outside the womb, it is possible to test the embryo prior to implantation. Only healthy embryos are selected for transfer into the mother's womb. In addition to Tay–Sachs disease, PGD has been used to prevent cystic fibrosis, sickle cell anemia, Huntington's disease, and other genetic disorders. However this method is expensive. It requires invasive medical technologies, and is beyond the financial means of most couples.

== Screening ==
Screening for TSD is carried out with two possible objectives:

- Carrier testing seeks to detect whether an individual unaffected by the disease is carrying one copy of a mutation. Individuals seeking carrier screening are couples from at-risk populations who are seeking to start a family. Individuals and couples who seek carrier screening are aware of test results or genetic disease in ancestors or living family members.
- Prenatal testing seeks to determine whether the fetus has inherited two defective copies, one from each parent. In prenatal testing, there is generally greater information about family history and the mutations are often known precisely. Prenatal testing for TSD is usually undertaken when both parents cannot be ruled out as possible carriers. Prenatal testing can be performed by assay of HEX A enzyme activity in fetal cells obtained by chorionic villus sampling or amniocentesis. If an actual mutation has been identified in both parents, then more precise mutational analysis techniques using PCR are available.

Two technical approaches to testing for Tay–Sachs mutations are available. The enzyme assay approach tests phenotype at the molecular level with the levels of enzyme activity, while the mutation analysis approach tests the genotype directly, seeking known genetic markers. As with all biomedical tests, both approaches can produce false positives and false negative results. The two methods are used in tandem because an enzyme assay can detect all mutations with some inconclusive results, while mutation analysis can give definite results, but only for known mutations. Family history can be used to select a more effective testing protocol.

Both carrier and prenatal testing using enzyme assay became available in the 1970s. Mutation analysis was added to testing protocols gradually after 1990 as the costs of PCR techniques declined. Over time, as knowledge of the mutation base has increased, mutation analysis has played an increasingly significant role.

Due to the sensitive nature of testing in parental decisions, beginning in the 1970s wrongful life suits began to emerge. This was most common among parents who were not previously aware of their risk factors and felt that their doctors had the responsibility to inform them of their genetic risks.

=== Enzyme assay techniques ===
Enzyme assay techniques detect individuals with lower levels of hexosaminidase A. Development of a serum enzyme assay test made it feasible to conduct large scale screening for Tay–Sachs in targeted at-risk populations such as Ashkenazi Jews. Developed in the late 1960s and then automated during the 1970s, the serum test was a first in medical genetics. It produced few false positives among Ashkenazi Jews, the first group targeted for screening.

In enzyme assay, success with one targeted population cannot always be generalized to other populations, because the mutation base is diverse. Different mutations have different effects on enzyme assay results. Polymorphisms are neutral, while others affect the phenotype without causing disease. Enzyme assay was particularly effective among Ashkenazi Jews because fewer pseudodeficiency alleles are found in this population, as compared with the general population.

Because serum can be drawn at low cost and without an invasive procedure, it is the preferred tissue for enzyme assay testing. Whole blood is normally drawn, but the enzyme assay measures activity in leukocytes, white blood cells that represent only a small fraction of whole blood. Serum testing gives inconclusive results in about 10% of cases when used to screen individuals from the general population. Serum testing also cannot be used to test pregnant women or women using hormonal birth control pills. To address these deficiencies, other techniques using enzyme assay have been developed.

=== Mutation analysis techniques ===
Although early testing for human mutations was often conducted by extracting DNA from larger tissue samples, modern testing in human subjects generally employs polymerase chain reaction because small tissue samples can be obtained by minimally invasive techniques, and at very low cost. PCR techniques amplify a sample of DNA and then test genetic markers to identify actual mutations. Current PCR testing methods screen a panel of the most common mutations, although this leaves open a small probability of both false positive and false negative results. PCR testing is more effective when the ancestry of both parents is known, allowing for proper selection of genetic markers. Genetic counselors, working with couples that plan to conceive a child, assess risk factors based on ancestry to determine which testing methods are appropriate.

Mutation analysis techniques have declined rapidly in cost since the 1980s, a development that has run parallel with advances in computation and information processing technology. At the same time, knowledge of mutations has increased, allowing researchers and practitioners to interpret mutation data.

It will soon be cost efficient to sequence and analyze the whole HEXA gene in at-risk specimens. Biotechnology offers the prospect that in the future, all individuals, even those without known risk factors, will be able to afford a full genome sequence report (see personal genomics). Such screening would identify novel as well as known mutations. As the cost of direct mutation analysis declines, medical genetics will confront the fact that full sequencing of the genome identifies polymorphisms that are neutral or harmless. This prospect will create uncertainty for couples using full genome sequencing methods. Czech medical geneticist Eva Machácková writes: "In some cases it is difficult to distinguish if the detected sequence variant is a causal mutation or a neutral (polymorphic) variation without effect on phenotype. The interpretation of rare sequence variants of unknown significance detected in disease-causing genes becomes an increasingly important problem."

=== In the Jewish population ===
Screening for Tay–Sachs carriers was one of the first great successes of the emerging field of genetic counseling and diagnosis. Proactive testing has been quite effective in eliminating Tay–Sachs occurrence among Ashkenazi Jews, both in Israel and in the diaspora. Starting in the 1970s, Jewish activists and organizers spread awareness through newspaper and magazine articles, Jewish newsletters, and posters at synagogues. Medical professionals volunteered by sending promotional letters and recruited rabbis and other leaders of the Jewish community to spread the word and encourage screening for Tay-Sachs. In 2000, Michael Kaback reported that in the United States and Canada, the incidence of TSD in the Jewish population had declined by more than 90% since the advent of genetic screening. On January 18, 2005, the Israeli English language daily Haaretz reported that as a "Jewish disease" Tay–Sachs had almost been eradicated. Of the 10 babies born with Tay–Sachs in North America in 2003, none had been born to Jewish families. In Israel, only one child was born with Tay–Sachs in 2003, and preliminary results from early 2005 indicated that none were born with the disease in 2004.

== Public health model ==
Michael Kaback, at the time a medical resident in pediatric neurology at Johns Hopkins University, saw two Tay–Sachs families in 1969. At the time, researchers had only recently uncovered the biochemical basis of TSD as the failure of an enzyme in a critical metabolic pathway. Kaback developed and later automated an enzyme assay test (first reported in 1969 by O'Brien) for detecting heterozygotes (carriers). In the targeted population, this inexpensive test proved statistically reliable, with low rates of both errors and false positives. For the first time in medical history, it was possible to screen broadly for carriers of a genetic disease, and a physician or medical professional could counsel a family on strategies for prevention. Within decades, the disease had been virtually eliminated among Ashkenazi Jews. Most cases today are in families that do not have identifiable risk factors.

Kaback and his associates also developed the first mass screening program for genetic disease carriers. Every aspect of this landmark study was meticulously planned, including community liaison, blood-draw procedure, laboratory set-up, assay protocol, and follow-up genetic counseling. On a Sunday in May 1971, more than 1,800 young adults of Ashkenazi Jewish ancestry in the Baltimore and Washington, D.C., areas were voluntarily screened for carrier status. The success of the program demonstrated the efficacy of voluntary screening of an identifiable at-risk population. Within years, these screening programs had been repeated among Ashkenazi Jews throughout the United States, Canada, western Europe, and Israel.

Tay–Sachs disease has become a model for the prevention of all genetic diseases. In the United States before 1970, the disease affected about 50–70 infants each year in Ashkenazi Jewish families. About 10 cases occurred each year in infants from families without identifiable risk factors. Before 1970, the disease had never been diagnosed at the time of birth. Physicians saw the disease for the first time in infants that failed to thrive, and they could do nothing for the parents or family. Although the genetic basis of the disease was understood, antenatal testing was not available, and families with a Tay–Sachs infant faced a one in four probability of another devastating outcome with each future pregnancy.

In the first 30 years of testing, from 1969 through 1998, more than 1.3 million persons were tested, and 48,864 carriers were identified. In at-risk families, among couples where both husband and wife were carriers, more than 3000 pregnancies were monitored by amniocentesis or chorionic villus sampling. Out of 604 monitored pregnancies where there was a prenatal diagnosis of Tay–Sachs disease, 583 pregnancies were terminated. Of the 21 pregnancies that were not terminated, 20 of the infants went on to develop classic infantile Tay–Sachs disease, and the 21st case progressed later to adult-onset Tay–Sachs disease. In more than 2500 pregnancies, at-risk families were assured that their children would not be affected by Tay–Sachs disease.
