= Dor Yeshorim =

Jewish genetic screening organization

- דור ישרים
- Formation: 1983; 43 years ago
- Founder: Josef Ekstein
- Founded at: Brooklyn, New York, United States
- Type: Nonprofit
- Website: doryeshorim.org

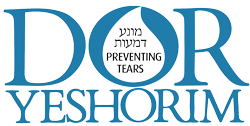
Dor Yeshorim's former logo, with the motto "Preventing Tears" (Hebrew: מונע דמעות)

Dor Yeshorim (Hebrew: דור ישרים) also called Committee for Prevention of Jewish Genetic Diseases, is a nonprofit organization that offers genetic screening to members of the Jewish community worldwide. Its objective is to minimize, and eventually eliminate, the incidence of genetic disorders common to Jewish people, such as Tay–Sachs disease. Dor Yeshorim is based in Brooklyn, New York, but has offices in Israel and various other countries.

== History ==
In both the Ashkenazi and Sephardi Jewish communities, there is an increased rate of a number of genetic disorders such as Tay–Sachs disease, an autosomal recessive disorder that goes unnoticed in carriers, but is fatal within the first few years of life in almost all homozygotes. (The exception is the rare adult-onset Tay–Sachs, which is normally not fatal but is incapacitating.)

Orthodox Judaism generally opposes selective abortion. Although preimplantation genetic diagnosis (PGD) is often approved by Halakha, it is a difficult and costly process. By avoiding marriages between "carriers", the incidence of the disorders decreases without having to resort to such methods.

Dor Yeshorim was founded in 1983 by Rabbi Josef Ekstein in Brooklyn. Its name, meaning "upright generation", comes from Psalms 112:2.

In a 2006 interview, Ekstein said that while four of his first five children died of Tay-Sachs disease, none of his children born subsequent to the founding of Dor Yeshorim suffered the condition. The same interview quotes a New York neurologist who credits the near-total disappearance of the condition from the ultra-orthodox community to Dor Yeshorim's involvement.

In 2005, a subsidiary of Dor Yeshorim called Kehila Cord was created for the collection and storing of umbilical cord blood.

In 2016, Dor Yeshorim received media attention when a rap video of two schoolgirls beat-boxing about their marriage prospects was shared in the Orthodox Jewish community. The organisation claimed to be "very disturbed by the whole thing" and that "...it is below our dignity as an organization to promote such a thing". Subsequently, Dor Yeshorim also issued an official statement distancing itself from the video.

== Operations ==
Dor Yeshorim screens only for recessive traits that give rise to lethal or severely debilitating disorders, providing prophylactic, rather than diagnostic services. They do not screen for disorders arising from dominant gene mutations, as these cannot be prevented by informed mate selection. Only conditions which can be reliably reported as a positive or negative genetic match are tested.

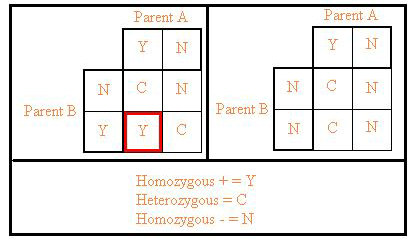
These diagrams, known as Punnett squares, are used to illustrate the method of trait transfer to offspring according to classical Mendelian genetics. In the Punnett square to the left, two heterozygous individuals (carriers) can potentially form three types of offspring: homozygous positive, heterozygous carriers and homozygous negative, in the ratio of 1:2:1. Homozygous positive offspring (highlighted in red) will completely express the particular recessive trait, in this case the genetic disorder. In the Punnett square to the right, a heterozygous carrier individual and a homozygous negative individual can potentially form two types of offspring: heterozygous carriers and homozygous negative, in the ratio of 1:1, and are necessarily unable to produce any affected offspring, barring a new random mutation. It is the situation depicted on the left, in which couples have the potential of producing affected offspring, that Dor Yeshorim attempts to prevent.

Three panels of tests are offered: the original Standard Ashkenazi Panel, the Sephardi/Mizrahi Panel, and the Optional Ashkenazi Panel (offered for an additional fee). Since January 2016, people who indicate that they are of Sephardic descent are automatically tested with both the Ashkenazi and Sephardi panels. The Standard Ashkenazi Panel includes testing for the following diseases:

- Tay–Sachs disease
- Familial dysautonomia
- Cystic fibrosis
- Canavan disease
- Glycogen storage disease (type 1)
- Fanconi anemia (type C)
- Bloom syndrome
- Niemann–Pick disease
- Mucolipidosis type IV
- Spinal muscular atrophy

The samples collected by Dor Yeshorim are anonymized; The only personal information associated with each sample is date of birth. A randomized ID number that identifies the sample is provided to the submitter. When two Dor Yeshorim clients contemplate marriage, they exchange sample ID numbers and birth dates and each contacts the organization. When both carry a gene for the same disorder, they are informed that the match is not recommended. In that case, a client can optionally contact Dor Yeshorim separately for counseling and support services. In this way, complete privacy is guaranteed; not even Dor Yeshorim employees are aware of who was found to be genetically incompatible unless the clients desire otherwise. Dor Yeshorim does not report to the clients which disease was indicated, in order to avoid "unnecessary emotional burden" and "stigmatization of families". In the context of shidduchim, this genetic compatibility check is commonly run within the first three dates or even before the first date, to avoid disappointments and heartbreak.

In the United States, testing costs range from $225 to $500. One-half of the actual testing costs is subsidized by private donors and governments.

For convenience, Dor Yeshorim provides yearly testing sessions at Orthodox Jewish schools for students who are approaching marriageable age. Samples can also be provided privately.

== Reception ==
The system has received praise and criticism from both within as well as outside the community.

By March 2006, Dor Yeshorim had achieved wide support in the Orthodox Jewish community and among its leaders, and had become a household name that was taken for granted. By that time, they had tested over 200,000 individuals, and had responded "incompatible" to 750 suggested matches.

There has been criticism leveled against the method used by Dor Yeshorim by Moshe Dovid Tendler, a professor of medical ethics at Yeshiva University.

The question arises, when do you stop? There are close to 90 [homozygous] genes you wouldn’t want to have. Will this lead to people showing each other computer print outs of their genetic conditions? We’ll never get married.

Fred Rosner, a professor of medicine at Albert Einstein College of Medicine, said that "I think Dor Yeshorim performs a tremendous service...screening is a wonderful thing to do, and if you can avoid the birth of a potentially lethally affected child, that is a good thing."

Dor Yeshorim has been criticised for withholding patient results, for declining to publish its financial records and for not testing anyone who has already been tested elsewhere, by Geoffrey Alderman, who says that Dor Yeshorim fails some fundamental tests itself. Critics including the Association for the Prevention of Jewish Genetic Diseases, have described Dor Yeshorim in the UK as a "Wedding tax".

Dor Yeshorim was also criticised for allegedly seeking to convince the Jewish community it must, for “religious reasons”, use its service, by circulating a letter from Bezalel Rakow. Rakow was a signatory to a subsequent letter stating that "Every individual has the privilege to perform the test in a manner consistent with his desires.” In 2012, the Jewish Chronicle published a letter by a Tay–Sachs carrier, who was hurt by a Dor Yeshorim organiser's insinuation that there was stigma attached to being a Tay–Sachs carrier.

== See also ==
- Carrier testing
- Medical genetics of Jews
- Prevention of autosomal recessive disorders
- Prevention of Tay–Sachs disease
