= David Rimoin =

American physician (1936–2012)

- Born: David Lawrence Rimoin; 9 November 1936; Montreal, Canada
- Died: 27 May 2012 (aged 75); Los Angeles, USA
- Education: McGill University; Johns Hopkins University
- Known for: Studies of skeletal dysplasia, Tay–Sachs disease, diabetes; Principles and Practice of Medical Genetics
- Spouse: Ann Garber Rimoin (2nd wife)
- Children: 3, including Anne Rimoin
- Parent(s): Fay (née Lecker) and Michael Rimoin
- Awards: Lifetime Achievement Award in Medical Genetics, Inspiring Excellence Award (both from the American College of Medical Genetics and Genomics)
- Scientific career
- Fields: Medical genetics
- Workplaces: Washington University in St. Louis; Harbor–UCLA Medical Center; Cedars-Sinai Medical Center
- Doctoral advisor: Victor A. McKusick

David Lawrence Rimoin (November 9, 1936 – May 27, 2012) was a Canadian American geneticist. He was especially noted for his research into the genetics of skeletal dysplasia (dwarfism), inheritable diseases such as Tay–Sachs disease, and diabetes.

== Biography ==
Rimoin was born in Montreal, the son of Fay (Lecker) and Michael Rimoin. Rimoin attended college and medical school at McGill University, where he received his bachelor's degree in 1957, followed by a medical degree and a Master of Science in genetics in 1961. He followed with internships and residencies at Royal Victoria Hospital in Montreal and at Johns Hopkins School of Medicine, where he studied under genetics pioneer Victor A. McKusick and received a Ph.D. in medical genetics. He spent three years at the Washington University School of Medicine where his first daughter Anne Walsh Rimoin was born. His 1970 study of diabetes challenged the then-prevailing consensus that diabetes was a single disorder, and showed instead that it could have multiple genetic causes.

In 1970 Rimoin moved to Harbor–UCLA Medical Center in Los Angeles, where he became chief of the division of medical genetics. He moved to Cedars-Sinai Medical Center in 1986. He founded the International Skeletal Dysplasia Registry. Together with Michael Kaback, he organized a California Tay-Sachs screening program that became a national model. Rimoin and English geneticist Alan Emery co-edited Principles and Practice of Medical Genetics, first published in 1983 and now considered an essential textbook on the subject. At Cedars-Sinai he was chair of the pediatrics practice, established an adult genetics program, and began a screening program focused on genetic diseases within Los Angeles' large population of Persian Jews.

Rimoin was mentioned in Frederick Drimmer's book "Very Special People". It stated that he had found that growth hormone could help pituitary dwarfs achieve close to normal height. Obtained from the pituitaries of human cadavers, it had not been available in sufficient supply.

In 1997–98, Rimoin was the first president of the American College of Medical Genetics and Genomics. After his death, the ACMG established two awards in his honor, the David L. Rimoin Lifetime Achievement Award in Medical Genetics and the David L. Rimoin Inspiring Excellence Award.

Rimoin died in Los Angeles on May 27, 2012, days after having been diagnosed with pancreatic cancer.
