= Tuomanen =

Tuomanen is a surname. Notable people with the surname include:

- Anne Tuomanen (born 1987), Finnish ice hockey player
- Elaine Tuomanen (born 1951), American pediatrician
- Jukka-Pekka Tuomanen (born 1985), Finnish former football player
