= Mark A. Kay =

American physician-scientist known for work in gene therapy

- Born: Mark Allan Kay
- Education: Michigan State University (B.S.); Case Western Reserve University (M.D., Ph.D.)
- Known for: AAV vector biology, liver-directed gene therapy, RNA interference
- Awards: National Academy of Inventors (2020); ASGCT Outstanding Investigator Award (2013); E. Mead Johnson Award (2000); National Hemophilia Foundation Researcher of the Year Award (2000)
- Scientific career
- Fields: Gene therapy, RNA biology, Genome editing
- Workplaces: Stanford University

Mark A. Kay is an American physician-scientist recognized for his contributions to the field of gene therapy, genome editing, and RNA biology. He has an h-index of 123, and is known for liver-directed gene therapy, demonstrating RNA interference in mammals, and advancing adeno-associated virus (AAV) vector biology.

== Education ==
Kay earned his B.S. in Physical Sciences from Lyman Briggs College at Michigan State University in 1980, and his M.D. and Ph.D. in Developmental Genetics from Case Western Reserve University in 1987. He completed a pediatric residency, medical genetics fellowship, and postdoctoral fellowship at Baylor College of Medicine in 1993.

== Career and research ==
Kay began his work in gene therapy in 1990. He was a founding member of the American Society of Gene and Cell Therapy (ASGCT) in 1996 and served as its Vice President, President-Elect, and President from 2003 to 2006. He played a role in establishing the society’s journal, Molecular Therapy, and advancing gene therapy research during a period of skepticism.

Kay has been a long-time editor of Human Gene Therapy. His research has led to advances in gene transfer mechanisms, vector biology, and gene regulation. He demonstrated the correction of Hemophilia B in a large animal model and filed the initial Investigational New Drug (IND) application for systemic administration of recombinant AAV in humans.

Kay’s team demonstrated functional RNA interference (RNAi) in whole mammals. His research has also explored microRNA (miRNA)-mediated gene repression, tRNA-derived small RNAs, and their applications in cancer therapeutics.

=== Academic and professional roles ===
From 1993 to 1998, Kay was a faculty member at the University of Washington in the Division of Medical Genetics, Department of Medicine. In 1998, he was recruited to Stanford University, where he currently serves as the Dennis Farrey Family Professor in the Departments of Pediatrics and Genetics and as Head of the Division of Human Gene Therapy in Pediatrics.

He co-founded Avocel Inc., Voyager Therapeutics, and LogicBio Therapeutics.

== Honors and recognition ==
Kay was elected to the National Academy of Inventors in 2020. He received the ASGCT Outstanding Investigator Award (2013), the E. Mead Johnson Award for Pediatric Research (2000), and the National Hemophilia Foundation Researcher of the Year Award (2000). He has mentored over 60 scientists.

== Research and publications ==
Kay has published nearly 300 research articles, including over 30 in high-impact journals such as Nature, Science, Cell, and The New England Journal of Medicine. His work has been cited over 65,000 times, and he has an h-index of 123.

=== Selected publications ===
- Snyder RO et al. (1999). Correction of hemophilia B in canine and murine models using recombinant adeno-associated viral vectors. Nat Med. 5:64–70. doi:10.1038/4751.
- McCaffrey AP et al. (2002). RNA interference in adult mice. Nature. 418:38–39. doi:10.1038/418038a.
- Grimm D et al. (2006). Fatality in mice due to oversaturation of cellular microRNA/short hairpin RNA pathways. Nature. 441:537–541. doi:10.1038/nature04791.
- Manno CS et al. (2006). Successful transduction of liver in hemophilia by AAV-Factor IX and limitations imposed by the host immune response. Nat Med. 12:342–347. doi:10.1038/nm1358.
- Grimm D et al. (2008). In vitro and in vivo gene therapy vector evolution via multispecies interbreeding and retargeting of adeno-associated viruses. J Virol. 82:5887–5911. doi:10.1128/JVI.00254-08.
