= Howard Markel =

American physician and medical historian (born 1960)

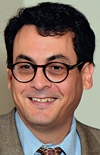
- Born: April 23, 1960 (age 66); Detroit, Michigan, U.S.
- Education: University of Michigan (BA, MD); Johns Hopkins University (PhD)

Howard Markel (born April 23, 1960) is an American physician and medical historian. At the end of 2023, Markel retired from the University of Michigan Medical School, where he served as the George E. Wantz Distinguished Professor of the History of Medicine and Director of the University's Center for the History of Medicine. He was also a professor of psychiatry, health management and policy, history, and pediatrics and communicable diseases. Markel writes extensively on major topics and figures in the history of medicine and public health.

== Early life and education ==
Markel was born in Detroit and grew up in Oak Park and Southfield, Michigan. He received a Bachelor of Arts degree (summa cum laude) in English from the University of Michigan in 1982 and earned his M.D. degree (cum laude) from the University of Michigan Medical School in 1986, before completing his internship, residency, and fellowship in pediatrics at the Johns Hopkins School of Medicine and the Johns Hopkins Hospital in 1993. Markel then joined the University of Michigan faculty as a Professor of Pediatrics and Professor of the History of Medicine. A medical historian by training, Markel earned his Ph.D. in the History of Medicine, Science and Technology from Johns Hopkins in 1994.

== Publications ==
=== Quarantine! ===
Markel's writing focuses on major topics and figures in the history of medicine. A consistent theme in his work has been the historical relationship between epidemics, social stigma and immigration, and public health. His book Quarantine!: East European Jewish Immigrants and the New York City Epidemics of 1892, focuses on the complex interaction between anti-immigrant prejudices in the United States and the ways such prejudices were mobilized during the typhus and cholera outbreaks of 1892 in New York City. Markel's argument about the tension between isolating disease and the potential for social scapegoating acquired new urgency during the 2014 Ebola epidemic. "Ebola is jerking us back to the 19th century", he stated in The New York Times.

=== When Germs Travel ===
When Germs Travel: Six Major Epidemics That Have Invaded America Since 1900 and the Fears They Have Unleashed expands the scope of Quarantine! by chronicling American epidemics during the two "great waves of immigration" that helped shape the 20th century. Markel argues that the association of immigrants with infectious disease is a key component of that history, and that their stigmatization during 20th century American epidemics "reveal[s] much about our predispositions for dealing with the perpetual threat of contagious disease".

=== An Anatomy of Addiction ===
Markel's An Anatomy of Addiction: Sigmund Freud, William Halsted, and the Miracle Drug Cocaine explores the lives and careers of Freud and Halsted through their relationship to cocaine. Having treated patients with various forms of substance abuse, Markel thought that sharing Freud and Halsted's struggles (both personal and scientific) with cocaine would raise awareness of the perniciousness of addiction while illuminating an important chapter in medical history. Discussing his work with Science Friday's Ira Flatow, Markel said "they were so compelling, and I thought using their lives and their struggles I could really put a human face on this terrible disease."

=== The Kelloggs ===
In August 2017, Pantheon Books published Markel's latest book, The Kelloggs: The Battling Brothers of Battle Creek. A finalist for the National Book Critics Circle Award, the book tells the story of the lives and times of the Kellogg Brothers of Battle Creek, Michigan.

=== Literatim: Essays on the Intersections of Medicine and Culture ===
In December 2019, Oxford University Press published Literatim: Essays at the Intersections of Medicine and Culture, a collection of the Markel's essays on medicine, American culture, and how their intersections compose the interstitial matter of modern life.

=== The Secret of Life: Rosalind Franklin, James Watson, Francis Crick and the Discovery of DNA’s Double Helix ===
The Secret of Life: Rosalind Franklin, James Watson, Francis Crick and the Discovery of DNA’s Double Helix, was published by W.W. Norton and Company in September 2021. Audiofile awarded the recorded book version with an October 2021 Earphone Award, The Washington Post named the version as one of the ten best audiobooks in 2021, and both Kirkus Reviews and National Public Radio placed it among its best books of the year list.

=== Origin Story: The Trials of Charles Darwin ===
Markel's latest book was published by W.W. Norton and Company in 2024. Applauded in the press, the book was named a New York Times Editor's Choice and The Economist Magazine book of the year.

=== The Milbank Quarterly ===
From 2013 to 2017, Markel was the editor-in-chief of the Milbank Quarterly, a peer-reviewed public health journal of population health and health policy.

=== Academic and popular periodicals ===
Markel has also contributed over 500 articles to scholarly publications and popular periodicals.

== Government advice and media appearances ==
=== Influenza ===
From 2005 to 2006, Markel served as a historical consultant on pandemic influenza preparedness planning for the United States Department of Defense. From 2006 to 2016 he served as principal historical consultant on pandemic preparedness for the U.S. Centers for Disease Control and Prevention. Markel was one of many who advised the federal government's response to the 2009 H1N1 influenza pandemic on the CDC Director's "Novel A/H1N1 Influenza Team B" real-time think tank. He and a team of researchers at the Center for the History of Medicine collaborated with the CDC to publish a digital encyclopedia of the 1918 influenza pandemic, the largest available digital collection of materials pertaining to the deadliest pandemic of the 20th century and one of the largest collections of historical documents ever assembled on a single epidemic. The collaboration between Markel and the CDC continued with analysis and documentation of non-pharmaceutical interventions deployed during the 2009 H1N1 flu pandemic. "

=== Ebola ===
During the 2014 Ebola epidemic, Markel contributed his expertise on the history of epidemics and quarantines to public forums such as NPR's All Things Considered, the BBC World Service, CNN/Sanjay Gupta MD, PBS NewsHour, and The New Yorker. He reminded readers in The New York Times that "we are a global village. Germs have always traveled. The problem now is they can travel with the speed of a jet plane." Markel additionally sought to enhance public understanding of the Ebola outbreak through op-eds for Reuters Opinion and The New Republic.

=== COVID-19 ===
He is best known for working with Martin Cetron at the U.S. Centers for Disease Control and having co-developed the evidence base of the concept of "flattening the curve," a means of social distancing that saved millions of lives around the globe during the first wave of COVID-19. This work was widely covered in newspapers and media around the world, including an "Annals of Medicine" article that appeared in The New Yorker on August 6, 2020. Markel wrote a piece in The New York Times criticizing the Chinese government for their response to the COVID-19 pandemic. He argued that the Wuhan lockdown, which had completely shut all transportation in Wuhan and surrounding cities, was "too much too late", and that "Incremental restrictions, enforced steadily and transparently, tend to work far better than draconian measures."

== Honors and awards ==
Markel's historical, medical, and health policy research has been recognized with numerous grants, honors and awards. In 1996 he was a Robert Wood Johnson Foundation Generalist Physician Faculty Scholar for his work on American Doctors and Foreign Patients; Health Care Delivery for Russian, Jewish, Mexican, and Chinese Immigrants to the United States between 1880 and 1995, while his work titled U.S. Immigration Policy and the Public Health, 1880-1995 received the National Institutes of Health's James A. Shannon Director's Award for 1997–1999. He was named a Centennial Historian of the City of New York in 1998 for his role in advising and planning the New York City 100: Greater New York Centennial Celebration. Markel was also an inaugural fellow at the New York Public Library's Center for Scholars and Writers from 1999 to 2000.

In 2003 Markel's Quarantine!—by that time established as "a classic in the history of public health"—was recognized by the American Public Health Association with The Arthur J. Viseltear Prize "for the outstanding book in the History of Public Health in America". In 2007, he received the Theodore Woodward Award from the American Clinical and Climatological Association for his presentation on "Non-Pharmaceutical Interventions Employed By Major American Cities During the 1918-19 Influenza Pandemic" and a Robert Wood Johnson Foundation Investigator Award in Health Policy, also awarded on the basis of Markel's work on the 1918-1919 pandemic.

In 2008, in recognition of contributions made throughout his career to the fields of medicine and public health, Markel was elected to the Institute of Medicine of the National Academies. In 2011 he was appointed to the Institute of Medicine's Board of Population Health and Public Health Practices and was chair of its Section on Social Sciences from 2013 to 2015. In 2015, the Institute of Medicine was renamed the National Academy of Medicine, of which Markel is an elected member.

In 2015 Markel was awarded a Guggenheim Fellowship from the John Simon Guggenheim Memorial Foundation for demonstrating "exceptional capacity for productive scholarship.

In 2016, he was inducted into the Johns Hopkins University Society of Fellows for distinguished work in his scholarly field.

In 2017, his book "The Kelloggs" was a Finalist in Biography for the National Book Critics Circle Award.

In 2019, the Johns Hopkins University School of Medicine awarded him with the Distinguished Alumnus Award for excellence and achievement through his personal and professional accomplishments.

In 2021, Markel was named a 2022 Visiting Fellow of Clare Hall, University of Cambridge.

== Books ==
- Markel, Howard; Oski, Frank A. (1990). The H.L. Mencken Baby Book: Comprising the Contents of H.L. Mencken's 'What You Ought to Know About Your Baby', with commentaries. Philadelphia: Hanley & Belfus. ISBN 9780932883223. OCLC 20353016.
- —— (1992). The Portable Pediatrician. Philadelphia: Hanley & Belfus. ISBN 9781560530077. OCLC 26060532.
- ——; Oski, Frank A. (1996). The Practical Pediatrician: the A-to-Z Guide to Your Child's Health, Behavior, and Safety. New York: W.H. Freeman and Co. ISBN 9780716728979. OCLC 34564899.
- —— (1997). Quarantine!: East-European Jewish Immigrants and the New York City Epidemics of 1892. Baltimore, Md.: Johns Hopkins University Press. ISBN 9780801855122. OCLC 35566332.
- —— (2004). Six Major Epidemics That Have Invaded America and the Fears They Have Unleashed (1st ed.). New York: Pantheon Books. ISBN 9780375420955. OCLC 52980646.
- —— (2011). An Anatomy of Addiction: Sigmund Freud, William Halsted and the Miracle Drug, Cocaine (1st ed.). New York: Pantheon Books. ISBN 9780307379818. OCLC 759513453.
- —— (2017). The Kelloggs: The Battling Brothers of Battle Creek (First ed.). New York. ISBN 9780307907288. OCLC 964624787.
- —— (2020). Literatim: Essays at the Intersections of Medicine and Culture (First ed.). New York: W.W. Norton & Company. ISBN 9780190070007.
- —— (2021). The Secret of Life: Rosalind Franklin, James Watson, Francis Crick, and the Discovery of DNA's Double Helix (First ed.). New York: Oxford University Press. ISBN 9781324002239.
- —— (2024). Origin Story: The Trials of Charles Darwin (First ed.). New York: W.W. Norton & Company. ISBN 9781324036746.
