= ASGT =

ASGT may refer to:

- American Society of Gene Therapy
- Acting Sergeant
