= Ophir Klein =

- Born: San Francisco Bay Area, US
- Awards: E. Mead Johnson Award

Academic background
- Education: BA, 1993, University of California, Berkeley; PhD, 1999, MD, 2000, Yale University

Academic work
- Institutions: UCSF School of Dentistry
- Website: klein.ucsf.edu

Ophir David Klein is an American developmental biologist who specializes in pediatric medical genetics. Klein is Executive Director of Cedars-Sinai Guerin Children’s, Vice Dean for Children’s Services, Professor of Pediatrics, and the David and Meredith Kaplan Distinguished Chair in Children’s Health. He is also a professor of Orofacial Sciences and Pediatrics at UCSF.

== Early life and education ==
Klein was raised in the San Francisco Bay Area and he completed his Bachelor of Arts degree from the University of California, Berkeley in 1993. Following this, he simultaneously earned his Ph.D. and medical degree from Yale University, where he also completed a pediatrics residency.

== Career ==
Upon completing his genetics residency at the University of California, San Francisco (UCSF) in 2007, Klein joined their faculty as an assistant professor of orofacial sciences, pediatrics, and human genetics. In this role, he focused his research efforts on the genetic control of the development of craniofacial structures. As a result, he received a California Institute for Regenerative Medicine grant for his project "Laying the groundwork for building a tooth: analysis of dental epithelial stem cells." In 2009, Klein was appointed director of UCSF's Craniofacial and Mesenchymal Biology Program, later renamed the Program in Craniofacial Biology.

Klein began his independent laboratory studying stem cells in the face and mouth. Due to this, he earned a 2010 National Institutes of Health (NIH) Director’s New Innovator Award to identify the genetic changes that led stem cells to arise in teeth during the evolution of mammals. Using this grant, Klein's laboratory focused on understanding the processes underlying craniofacial and dental malformations and on the cellular and molecular mechanisms that enable epithelial renewal. Klein was eventually promoted to chair of the Division of Craniofacial Anomalies and director of the Center for Craniofacial Anomalies. He was also elected a member of the American Society for Clinical Investigation in the same year.

While serving in his new role, Klein collaborated with Jukka Jernvall at the University of Helsinki to create rodent teeth that replicate those of an earlier evolutionary time. Following this, Klein participated in the first phase I clinical trial to treat Ectodysplasin A in humans. Later that year, Klein was recognized by the American Association for the Advancement of Science for "distinguished contributions to the field of oral biology, particularly in the development of a novel system for the study of dental stem cells." The following year, he was the 2015 recipient of the E. Mead Johnson Award from the Society for Pediatric Research.

By 2016, Klein refocused his laboratory to study how organs form in the embryo and how they renew and regenerate in the adult. Due to this, he received one of two new Sustaining Outstanding Achievement in Research awards from the NIH to support his research on the regenerative properties of craniofacial and dental stem cells. Klein was also the recipient of the 2017 International Association for Dental Research (IADR) Distinguished Scientist Award in Craniofacial Biology Research. In 2018, Klein was one of four UCSF faculty elected a member of the National Academy of Medicine for "demonstrating outstanding professional achievements and commitment to service in the medical sciences, health care, and public health."

After serving as interim director since July 1, 2020, Klein earned a permanent appointment as Director of the Institute for Human Genetics in September 2021. Klein was also elected vice president of the IADR in 2020, and has been a member since 2008. In 2022, he joined Cedars-Sinai as Executive Director of Guerin Children’s and Vice Dean for Children’s Services.
