= Harold E. Harrison and Helen C. Harrison =

American physician

Harold E. Harrison (1908–1989) and Helen Coplan Harrison (1911–2004) were a husband-and-wife research team in pediatrics who individually and jointly published more than 175 research papers and one textbook on topics including pediatric metabolic disorders, parathyroid hormone and bone, vitamin D, renal and intestinal transport, nutrition, rickets, and lead poisoning. They were jointly the authors of Disorders of Calcium and Phosphate Metabolism in Childhood and Adolescence, a comprehensive medical reference published in 1979.

The Harold E. Harrison Medical Library is a part of the Johns Hopkins University Bayview Medical Campus.

== Awards and honors ==
- 1938 E. Mead Johnson Award, awarded jointly
- 1942 E. Mead Johnson Award, awarded jointly
- 1961 Borden Award, to Harold E. Harrison
- 1980 American College of Nutrition Award to Harold E. Harrison
- 1983 John Howland Award, awarded jointly
