= Ronald Worton =

Canadian doctor

Ronald G. Worton OC FRSC (born April 2, 1942) is a Canadian doctor.

Born in Winnipeg, Manitoba, he earned a BSc and MSc from the University of Manitoba and a PhD in medical biophysics from the University of Toronto. Worton pursued post-doctoral studies at Yale University. In 1971, he became director of the diagnostic cytogenetics laboratory at The Hospital for Sick Children in Toronto. Worton became geneticist in chief at the hospital and professor of Medical Genetics at the University of Toronto in 1985. In 1996, he became director of research at the Ottawa General Hospital and chief executive officer of the Ottawa Hospital Research Institute, as well as professor of medicine, University of Ottawa.

Worton and his team identified the dystrophin gene whose mutation is associated with Duchenne and Becker muscular dystrophies. Under his leadership, the genetics department at The Hospital for Sick Children also identified genes associated with cystic fibrosis, Fanconi anemia, Wilson's disease, Wilms' tumor and Tay–Sachs disease.

Worton served four years on the board of the Human Genome Organization, twelve years as associate director for the Canadian Genetic Diseases network, six years as head of the Canadian Genome Analysis and Technology Program and four years as founding scientific director of the Canadian Stem Cell Network.

He was awarded a Gairdner Foundation International Award in 1989, was named an officer of the Order of Canada in 2012 and is a fellow of the Royal Society of Canada. He has also received the E. Mead Johnson Award for pediatrics research. In 2014, Worton was inducted into the Canadian Medical Hall of Fame.

Worton has retired from medical research and lives in Oakville, Ontario, spending his winters in Mesa, Arizona.
