= Friedhelm Hildebrandt =

German-American physician and nephrology researcher

- Born: February 11, 1957 (age 69)
- Education: Heidelberg University
- Known for: Genetic causes of kidney disease; nephrotic syndrome; renal ciliopathies
- Awards: E. Mead Johnson Award (2004); Homer Smith Award (2014); Alfred R. Newton Award (2017)
- Scientific career
- Fields: Pediatrics; Nephrology; Human genetics
- Workplaces: Harvard Medical School; Boston Children's Hospital; University of Michigan; Howard Hughes Medical Institute
- Academic advisors: Peter Aronson; Peter Igarashi

Friedhelm Hildebrandt (born February 11, 1957) is the William E. Harmon Professor of Pediatrics at Harvard Medical School and Chief of the Division of Nephrology at Boston Children's Hospital. He was formerly an Investigator of the Howard Hughes Medical Institute (HHMI) and the Frederick G.L. Huetwell Professor of Pediatrics at the University of Michigan.

== Early life and education ==
Hildebrandt received his M.D. degree from Heidelberg University in Germany, completed his clinical training in general pediatrics and pediatric nephrology at Freiburg University Children’s Hospital, and conducted postdoctoral research in nephrology at the Yale School of Medicine under Peter Aronson and Peter Igarashi.

== Research ==
Friedhelm Hildebrandt identified and functionally characterized multiple kidney diseases caused by single-genes (Mendelian) including nephrotic syndrome, cystic renal ciliopathies, and congenital anomalies of the kidney

Hildebrandt was elected to the American National Academy of Medicine in 2015, Leopoldina in 2007, and to the Association of American Physicians in 2005. He is a recipient of the Homer Smith Award of the American Society of Nephrology (2014), the Alfred R. Newton Award of the International Society of Nephrology (ISN) (2017), and the E. Mead Johnson Award from the Society for Pediatric Research (2004).

Hildebrandt’s group has identified over 80 novel causative genes of the 240 genes that are currently known to cause chronic kidney disease, if mutated. His laboratory delineated the related disease mechanisms by generating animal models of human kidney disease in mice, zebrafish, C. elegans, and Drosophila as well in cell-based systems. He demonstrated that in a very high percentage of cases with early-onset chronic kidney disease a single-gene cause may be identified. Link to pertinent publications.

== See also ==
- Ciliopathy
- Nephrology
- Mendelian disorder
- Nephrotic syndrome
- Harvard Medical School
- Boston Children's Hospital
