= Ann Arvin =

American pediatrician (born 1945)

- Born: 1945 (age 80–81)
- Education: Brown University; Brandeis University; University of Pennsylvania

Ann M. Arvin (born 1945) is an American pediatrician and microbiologist. She is the Lucile Salter Packard Professor of Pediatrics and Professor of Microbiology & Immunology Emerita at Stanford University. Arvin is a specialist of the Varicella zoster virus (VZV) and a prominent national figure in health. Arvin is currently the chief of the infectious diseases division of pediatrics at the Lucile Packard Children's Hospital, as well as the former Stanford's Vice Provost and Dean of Research.

== Education ==
Ann Arvin received her undergraduate degree in Philosophy from Brown University in 1966. She earned her M.A. in Philosophy from Brandeis University. Arvin graduated from the University of Pennsylvania's medical school in 1972, completed her pediatric residency at UCSF in 1975 and her postdoctoral fellowship at Stanford University in 1978.

== Positions ==
Ann Arvin has contributed to multiple national committees and boards. Arvin was elected to the Institute of Medicine (IOM), part of the National Academy of Sciences in 2003. She was one of the committee members for the 1999 Institute of Medicine Committee on the Assessment of Future Scientific Needs for Live Variola Virus and the chair of the 2009 IOM. She also served on the U.S. Food and Drug Administration (FDA) Vaccines and Related Biological Products Advisory Committee, the NIH Collaborative Antiviral Study Group, the World Health Organization Committee on Research Related to Measles and Measles Vaccine, and the Council of the National Institute of Allergy and Infectious Disease. Arvin is also a member of the Council of the American Society of Virology, the Thrasher Foundation Advisory Board, National Vaccine Advisory Committee, which advises the Secretary of the Department of Health and Human Services.

== Research ==
Ann Arvin's research surrounds infectious diseases like Varicella Zoster virus (VZV), "focusing on the functional roles of particular viral gene products in pathogenesis and virus-cell interactions in differentiated human cells in humans and in SCID mouse models of VZV cell tropisms in vivo." Her research also surrounds T-cell response and immunity in children and the immunocompromised.

She was the editor of several books in pediatrics and virology field, such as Nelson Textbook Of Pediatrics: Multi User, "Current Topics in Microbiology and Immunology: Varicella-zoster Virus", "Nelson Essentials of Pediatrics", "Varicella-zoster Virus: Virology and clinical management", "Human Herpesviruses: Biology, Therapy, and Immunoprophylaxis", "Immunity to and Prevention of Herpes Zoster", and "Live Variola Virus: Considerations for Continuing Research".

== Honors ==
Arvin has received several awards and honors for her research, such as the E. Mead Johnson Award for Research in Pediatrics (1992), the John F. Enders Distinguished Lecture in Medical Virology (2002), the Distinguished Graduate Award for 2010 from the University of Pennsylvania School of Medicine, and Stanford University School of Medicine's Dean's Medal (2016). Arvin was elected to the National Academy of Sciences in 2026.
