= William Silverman =

American physician (1917–2004)

- Born: October 23, 1917; Cleveland, Ohio
- Died: December 16, 2004 (aged 87); Greenbrae, California
- Education: University of California, Los Angeles; University of California, San Francisco
- Known for: Evidence-based medicine
- Awards: E. Mead Johnson Award (1958)
- Scientific career
- Fields: Neonatology
- Workplaces: Columbia-Presbyterian Medical Center

William Aaron Silverman (October 23, 1917 – December 16, 2004) was an American physician who made important contributions to neonatology. He held academic positions at Columbia University College of Physicians and Surgeons and served as the medical director of the neonatal intensive care unit at Columbia-Presbyterian Medical Center. Silverman urged physicians to address considerations like quality of care in formulating medical treatment plans, especially in the management of premature infants.

== Biography ==
=== Early life ===
Silverman was born in Cleveland in 1917. In an interview late in his life, Silverman said that his mother had rheumatic heart disease and that she struggled with her health after he was born, so he was raised mostly by his grandparents. Silverman was also sickly as a child. His family moved to Los Angeles in 1920, hoping that the climate would have beneficial effects on the health of Silverman and his mother. Silverman's mother died of a stroke two years later.

He completed undergraduate studies at the University of California, Los Angeles (UCLA). Silverman earned a medical degree from the University of California, San Francisco (UCSF). He completed a residency at Columbia-Presbyterian Medical Center.

=== Appointments and service ===
Remaining on the staff at Columbia-Presbyterian after his residency, Silverman later became the director of the hospital's neonatal intensive care unit. After many years at Columbia-Presbyterian, Silverman moved back to California and directed the neonatal intensive care unit at San Francisco Children's Hospital. He also spent time working with children who had been blinded by retinopathy of prematurity, previously known as retrolental fibroplasia.

=== Contributions ===
In the 1950s, Silverman contributed to the knowledge that retinopathy of prematurity was related to the high concentrations of oxygen administered to premature infants. Early in his career, he had conducted a trial that examined the use of adrenocorticotropic hormone (ACTH) in treating retinopathy of prematurity. Though his research seemed to support ACTH as an effective treatment for the condition, researchers at Johns Hopkins University School of Medicine disproved this connection. The experience with ACTH made a strong impression on Silverman, who became adamant that strong scientific evidence must guide medical decisions. Epidemiologist David Sackett said that Silverman was "clearly the pioneer" in evidence-based medicine.

Emphasizing that physicians must consider quality of life before deciding to pursue new and aggressive treatments in the neonatal intensive care unit, Silverman supported the right of parents to decide that their severely premature babies should not be resuscitated. Referring to Silverman's position in medicine in the 1950s, UCSF physician Malcolm Holliday said, "Bill was really regarded as the premier neonatologist of that period."

=== Later life ===
In 2003, the American Foundation for the Blind awarded its highest honor, the Migel Medal, to Silverman.

He died of renal failure in late 2004. Upon his death, he had been married to Ruth Silverman for 59 years. They had three children.

=== Legacy ===
The Cochrane Collaboration awards the Bill Silverman Prize to a researcher who evaluates and improves the presentation, maintenance or dissemination of the collaboration's materials. The American Academy of Pediatrics honored him in 2006 with the creation of the William A. Silverman Lectureship.

== Selected publications ==
- Dunham's Premature Infants, Third Edition (1961)
