= Arthur J. Ammann =

American pediatric immunologist (1936–2021)

- Born: August 12, 1936; Brooklyn, New York City, United States
- Died: August 15, 2021 (aged 85); San Rafael, California, United States
- Education: Wheaton College (BS); New Jersey Medical School (MD)
- Scientific career
- Fields: Pediatric immunology

Arthur J. Ammann (August 12, 1936 – August 15, 2021) was an American pediatric immunologist and advocate known for his research on HIV transmission, discovering in utero transmission and the risk of contaminated transfusions and blood products, and his role in the development of the first successful vaccine to prevent pneumococcal infection in 1977. He founded Global Strategies for HIV Prevention and was Clinical Professor of Pediatrics at the UCSF Medical Center.

== Education ==
Ammann was born in Brooklyn, New York, to German parents, neither of whom finished grade school. He graduated from Brooklyn Technical High School and attended Wheaton College in Illinois, continuing on to study medicine at New Jersey Medical School, where he received his M.D. in 1962. Ammann later became the first pediatric immunologist at UCSF, where he served his residency in pediatrics.

== Research ==
=== Early research ===
In 1966, for the first time, Ammann and Richard E. Stiehm documented Immunoglobulin A (IgA) as the major immunoglobulin class in breastmilk, present in high concentrations in colostrum mature breastmilk. They postulated that the protection afforded to infants by breast-feeding was a result of exposure to local antibodies contained within IgA rather than absorption of maternal antibody into these infants circulation.

Ammann, Stiehm and James D. Cherry identified that there are elevated levels of Immunoglobulin M (IgM) in the cord blood of newborn infants born with the congenital rubella syndrome. This was a major step forward in understanding the fetal immune response and developing diagnostic tools to differentiate between in utero infection with infectious agents such as rubella, toxoplasmosis and cytomegalovirus from infections acquired following birth.

In 1973, Ammann led his research team to perform the first successful reconstitution of T-cell immunity in a patient with severe combined immunodeficiency. This was achieved through fetal thymus transplantation. This study demonstrated that the thymus holds only the potential of developing T cells and will not result in reconstitution of B cell immunity as was subsequently shown by others who utilized bone marrow transplantation, which contained multi-potential stem cells.

Working with E. R. Giblett in 1972, Ammann described the first patient with purine nucleoside phosphorylase deficiency in association with a unique genetic profile that included depressed T-cell immunity with normal levels of immunoglobulins. The resulting publication was listed as one of the 500 most widely cited articles in 1984. Ammann's discovery represented an essential step to understanding new treatments for immunodeficiency diseases and developing drugs that could interfere with the immune response.

=== Pneumococcal vaccine ===
From 1971 to 1985, Ammann was director of Pediatric Immunology and Clinical Research Center at UCSF. It was during this period that Ammann performed a series of clinical trials aimed at protecting children with sickle cell anemia and the elderly from pneumococcal infection, a bacterium that causes fatal infection. He and his colleagues were successful in creating the first U.S. Food and Drug Administration-approved vaccine effective against the bacteria; it granted individuals immunity against a life-threatening infection. Ammann's vaccine has since been expanded and its immunogenicity has been improved, increasing the effectiveness of the vaccine in young infants. This discovery has saved the lives of millions of individuals by preventing pneumococcal infection, particularly in children and the elderly.

=== HIV transmission and treatment ===
In 1981, while working at UCSF in a lab that could perform the immunologic tests needed to detect immunodeficiency in AIDS patients, Ammann observed immunodeficiency disorders in children that mirrored those of gay men who had contracted the Human Immunodeficiency Virus. Ammann's investigations into the cause of the symptoms led him to identify two new means of transmission, in utero mother to infant and blood transfusions. With the medical community wanting not to believe that AIDS could affect infants, Ammann's initial publication blood transfusion infection was rejected by prominent medical journals. This discovery changed the perception of HIV/AIDS as an epidemic solely within the gay community.

In 1985, Ammann left his position at UCSF in order to work with the biotechnology firm, Genentech. There he developed clinical products focused on HIV/AIDS, and although while with Genentech a successful vaccine was not developed, the discoveries made by Ammann's research team were used by other researchers in a partially successful study performed in Thailand in 2009.

In 1994, Ammann was selected to become a member of the Presidential National AIDS Task Force on Drug and Vaccine Development. Three years later, in 1996, he was recognized by POZ magazine as one of the fifty most influential AIDS researchers.

== Advocacy ==
Ammann spent much of his life fighting injustices within the health care system, nationally and internationally. From 1992 to 1996 he served as director of research programs for the Pediatric AIDS Foundation. Ammann was also the chairman of the Conference on Global Strategies for Prevention of HIV Transmission from Mothers to Infants.

Ammann became a member of the American Foundation for AIDS Research (AmFAR) Board of directors in 1988, and was also appointed chairman of the AmFAR scientific advisory committee. From 1997 to 1998 Ammann served as president of AmFAR. In these positions, Ammann fought for an increase in research funding in HIV, in particular for women and children, and the development of more cost-effective treatments.

In 1997, Ammann founded Global Strategies for HIV Prevention. In his position as president, Ammann advocated for the needs of the most marginalized populations that are affected by the HIV epidemic. The organization is aimed at helping to prevent HIV transmission from mothers to infants in order to slow the spread of the HIV virus.

== Death ==
Ammann died in San Rafael, California, on August 15, 2021, three days after his 85th birthday.

== Selected awards and honors ==
- 1977 E. Mead Johnson Award for Pediatric Research, New York, NY.
- 1987 Distinguished Alumnus Award, New Jersey College of Medicine, Newark, NJ.
- 1994 Selected as one of "The POZ 50," individuals who have most influenced the course of HIV/AIDS.
- 1995 AmFAR's Outstanding Research in Pediatric AIDS Award. Presented on World's AIDS Day.
- 2000 American Society of Microbiology Heroes in Medicine Award
- 2001 Research in Action Award. Presented by Treatment Action Group. December 8, 2001. New York, NY.
- 2007 Wheaton College Outstanding Alumnus Award for Service to Humanity
- 2010/2011 Purpose Prize Fellow Encore Career for continued dedication to issues of justice and equity.
- 2013 Bakken Invitation Honoree.

== Selected publications ==
- Ammann AJ and Stiehm ER. Immune Globulin Levels in Colostrum and Breast Milk, and Serum From Formula- and Breast-Fed Newborns. Proc Soc Exp Biol Med, 122:1098-1100, 1966.
- Stiehm ER, Ammann AJ, Cherry JD. Elevated cord macroglobulins in the diagnosis of intrauterine infections. NEJM, 275:971-977, 1966.
- Ammann AJ, Wara D, Salmon S, Perkins H. Thymus transplantation. Thymus Transplantation — Permanent Reconstitution of Cellular Immunity in a Patient with Sex-Linked Combined Immunodeficiency. NEJM, 289:5-9, 1973.
- Wara DW, Goldstein AL, Doyle NE, Ammann AJ. Thymosin Activity in Patients with Cellular Immunodeficiency. NEJM, 292:70-74, 1975. (One of the 500 most widely quoted articles in 1980, Citation Classic)
- Giblett ER, Ammann AJ, Sandman R, Wara DW, Diamond LK. Nucleoside-phosphorylase deficiency in a child with severely defective T-cell immunity and normal B-cell immunity. Lancet, 1:2020-1014, 1975. (One of the 500 most widely quoted articles in 1984, Citation Classic)
- Ammann AJ, Addiego J, Wara DW, Lubin B, Smith WB, Mentzer WC. Polyvalent pneumococcal-polysaccharide immunization of patients with sickle-cell anemia and patients with splenectomy. NEJM, 297:897-900, 1977.
- Ammann AJ, Cowan MJ, Wara DW, Weintrub P, Dritz S, Goldman H, Perkins HA. Acquired immunodeficiency in an infant: Possible transmission by means of blood products. Lancet, 1:956-958, 1983.
- Curran TW, Lawrence DN, Jaffe HS, Kaplan JE, Zyla LD, Chamberland M, Weinstein R, Lui KJ, Schonberger LB, Spira TJ, Alexander WJ, Swinger G, Ammann AJ, Solomon S, Auerbach D, Mildvan D, Stoneburner R, Jason JM, Haverkos HW, Evat BL. Acquired immunodeficiency associated with transfusions. NEJM, 310:69-75, 1984.
- Cowan MJ, Hellmann D, Chudwin D, Wara DW, Chang RS, Ammann AJ. Maternal transmission of acquired immune deficiency syndrome. Pediat, 73:382-386, 1984.
- Cao Y, Krogstad P, Korber BT, Koup RA, Muldoon M, Macken C, Song J-L, Jin Z, Zhao J-Q, Clapp S, Chen ISY, Ho DD., Ammann AJ and the Ariel Project Investigators. Maternal HIV-1 viral load and vertical transmission of infection: The Ariel Project for the prevention of HIV transmission from mother to infant. Nature Medicine 3: 549-552 1997.
- Ammann AJ. HIV in China: An Opportunity to Halt an Emerging Epidemic. Ammann AJ AIDS Patient Care and STDs 14:109-112, 2000.
- Ammann AJ. Introduction to the Second Conference on Global Strategies for the Prevention of HIV Transmission from Mothers to Infants. Annals NY Academy of Sciences 918:1-2, 2000.
- Kim JY, Ammann AJ. Is the "3 by 5" initiative the best approach to tackling the HIV pandemic? PLoS Med. 2004 Nov;1(2):e37. Epub 2004 Nov 30.
- Ammann AJ. Feminization of the HIV Epidemic. Radix 32:8-13 2006
- Ammann AJ. Advances in HIV Care and Treatment in Resource Poor Countries. HIV Therapy. 2009 3:329-338.
