= Robert J. Desnick =

American geneticist

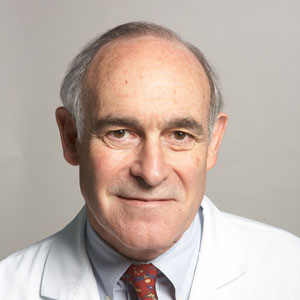
- Born: Minneapolis, MN
- Education: University of Minnesota Medical School
- Known for: translational research in genetics and genomics; research on inherited metabolic diseases
- Awards: E. Mead Johnson Award (1981)
- Scientific career
- Fields: human genetics and genomics
- Workplaces: Mount Sinai Hospital

Robert J. Desnick is an American human geneticist whose basic and translational research accomplishments include significant discoveries in genomics, pharmacogenetics, gene therapy, personalized medicine, and the treatment of genetic diseases. His translational research has led to the development of the enzyme replacement therapy (ERT) and the chaperone therapy for Fabry disease, ERT for Niemann–Pick disease type B, and the RNA Interference Therapy for the Acute Hepatic Porphyrias.

He was the co-founder of Amicus Therapeutics, a biopharmaceutical company developing pharmacologic chaperone therapies (Galafold approved 2018), and served as the Chairman of the Scientific Advisory Committees (SAC) of Synageva BioPharma and Kiniksa Pharmaceuticals. The enzyme therapy developed in his laboratory and licensed to Genzyme as Fabrazyme, along with Cerazyme for Gaucher disease, helped build the rare disease company Genzyme, which has spawned more CEOs than any other company in history following its 2011 sale to Sanofi for $20.1 billion.

Desnick is the Dean for Genetics and Genomic Medicine, and Professor and Chairman Emeritus of the Department of Genetics & Genomic Sciences at The Icahn School of Medicine at Mount Sinai in New York City. Additionally, he is Professor of Pediatrics, Professor of Oncological Sciences, and Professor of Obstetrics, Gynecology and Reproductive Science at The Mount Sinai Hospital.

Desnick is the author of more than 590 peer-reviewed articles in scientific journals, 250 book chapters and is the editor of 10 books. He holds 26 US issued and licensed patents and is included in Castle Connelly's lists of Best Doctors in America and Best Doctors in New York and New York Magazine’s list of the Best Doctors every year since the inception of the rating. He was elected to the National Academies of Sciences, Engineering and Medicine in 2004.

Part of his genetics laboratory at Mount Sinai was spun out into Sema4 (NASDAQ: SMFR), which IPO’d in 2021 for $3 billion.

== Biography ==
Desnick received his undergraduate degree from the University of Minnesota in 1965. He earned a Ph.D. in genetics from the University of Minnesota Graduate School in 1970 and his M.D. from the University of Minnesota Medical School in 1971. He completed an internship and a residency in pediatrics at the University of Minnesota Hospitals and joined the faculty at the University of Minnesota, where he rose to the rank of associate professor of Cell Biology and Genetics and Pediatrics.

Desnick joined the staff at Mount Sinai Medical Center in 1977, as the Arthur J. and Nellie Z. Cohen Professor of Pediatrics and Genetics and Chief of the Division of Medical and Molecular Genetics. He was the first chairman of the newly created Department of Human Genetics in 1993, which was renamed the Department of Genetics & Genomic Sciences in 2006. In 2009, he became Dean for Genetics & Genomic Medicine and Interim Director of the newly established Genomics Institute at Mount Sinai. He is currently Professor of Pediatrics, Oncological Sciences, Obstetrics, Gynecology and Reproductive Science, Gene and Cell Medicine and Professor and Chairman Emeritus of Genetics & Genomic Sciences.

Desnick is an elected member of the Society for Pediatric Research, the American Pediatric Society, the American Society for Clinical Investigation, and the Association of American Physicians. He is an elected Fellow of the American Association for the Advancement of Science, and an elected member of the National Academy of Medicine of the National Academy of Sciences. His research awards include the E. H. Ahrens, Jr. Award for Research from the Association for Patient-Oriented Research and the Award for Excellence in Clinical Research from the National Center for Research Resources from the National Institutes of Health. He received the Outstanding Achievement Award from the University of Minnesota.

Desnick is a past director of the American Board of Medical Genetics, a Founding Diplomat of the American College of Medical Genetics, a past member of the board of directors of the American College of Medical Genetics Foundation, and a founder and past president of the Association of Professors of Human and Medical Genetics. He is past chair of the Association of American Medical Colleges (AAMC), past member of the AAMC Board of Directors and past chair of the AAMC Council of Academic Societies. He is currently the President of the American Porphyrias Expert Collaborative.

== Personal life ==
He lives in New York City and Palm Beach with his wife, Julie Herzig Desnick, and son, Jonathan Desnick. Julie is an Abstract Expressionist painter and a LEED-certified, Registered Architect.

He is a Trustee of the American School of Classical Studies in Athens.

== Fellowships and awards ==
Partial list:

- U.S. Public Health Service Fellowship in Genetics, 1968–1970
- Ross Award in Pediatric Research, 1972
- C. J. Watson Award, University of Minnesota Medical School, 1973
- NIH Research Career Development Award, 1975–1980
- E. Mead Johnson Award for Research in Pediatrics of the American Academy of Pediatrics, 1981
- Honorary Member, Japanese Society for Inherited Metabolic Diseases, Elected 1985
- Correspondent Member, Societá Italiana di Pediatria, Elected 1991
- Honorary Member, Societá Italiana di Pediatria, Elected 1999
- Outstanding Faculty Award, Mount Sinai School of Medicine, 1991
- NIH MERIT Award, 1992–2004
- J. Lester Gabrilove Award for Medical Research, 2003
- Jacobi Medal, Mount Sinai Alumni Association, 2004
- Edward H. Ahrens, Jr. Award for Research from the Association for Patient-Oriented Research, 2004
- University of Minnesota Medical School Distinguished Alumni Award, 2004
- Doctor of Science, Honoris Causa, Mount Sinai School of Medicine of New York University, 2004
- Elected Senior Fellow, American Association for the Advancement of Science, 2004
- Elected Member, National Academy of Medicine of the National Academies of Sciences, Engineering, and Medicine, 2004
- Award for Excellence in Clinical Research from the National Center for Research Resources, NIH, 2005
- Albion O. Bernstein, MD Award for Contributions in Disease Prevention from the New York State Medical Society, 2005
- Distinguished Service Award, Association of American Medical Colleges, 2010
- Faculty Council Senior Award, Mount Sinai School of Medicine, 2011
- Lifetime Innovation & Achievement Award of the Lysosomal Disease Network, NIH, 2013
- Genetic Disease Foundation Scientific Honoree for Contributions to Genetic Research and Genetic Medicine
- 2013 Inventor of the Year Award of the New York Intellectual Property Law Association, 2013
- 2017 Rare Impact Award, National Organization for Rare Disorder
- University of Minnesota, College of Biological Sciences, Lifetime Achievement Award, 2018
- University of Minnesota, Outstanding Achievement Award, 2019

== Grants ==
Partial list:

- Research Training For Medical Geneticists at Icahn School of Medicine at Mount Sinai, National Institute of General Medical Sciences
- Porphyria Rare Disease Clinical Research Consortium (rdcrc), National Institute of Diabetes and Digestive and Kidney Diseases
- Mental Retardation and Developmental Disabilities, National Institute of Child Health and Human Development
- Porphyrias and Human Heme Biosynthesis, National Institute of Diabetes and Digestive and Kidney Diseases
- Alpha Galactosidases A And B – Molecular and Cellular Mechanisms, National Institute of Diabetes and Digestive and Kidney Diseases
- Gene Therapy: Lysosomal Diseases With Mental Retardation, National Institute of Child Health & Human Development

== Patents ==
- Cloning and expression of biologically active human alpha-galactosidase A, (1994).
- Cloning and expression of biologically active α-N-acetylgalactosaminidase, (1995).
- Cloning and expression of biologically active α-galactosidase A, (1995).
- Cloning and expression of biologically active α-N-acetylgalactosaminidase, (1996).
- Cloning and expression of biologically active alpha-galactosidase A as a fusion protein, (1996).
- Acid sphingomyelinase gene and diagnosis of Niemann-Pick disease, (1997).
- Acid sphingomyelinase gene, (1998).
- Methods for the treatment of bone resorption disorders, including osteoporosis, (1998).
- Methods for determining susceptibility to lead poisoning, (1998).
- Cells expressing an αGalA nucleic acid and methods of xenotransplantation, (2002).
- Acid sphingomyelinase protein and methods of treating type B Niemann-Pick disease, (2003).
- Method for enhancing mutant enzyme activities in lysosomal storage disorders, (2003).
- Chaperone-based therapy for Niemann-Pick disease, (2010).
- Dose escalation enzyme replacement therapy for treating acid sphingomyelinase deficiency, (2013).
- Dose escalation enzyme replacement therapy for treating acid sphingomyelinase deficiency, (2014).
- Dose escalation enzyme replacement therapy for treating acid sphingomyelinase deficiency, (2014).
- Compositions and methods for inhibiting expression of the ALAS1 gene, (2015).
- Method and kits for detecting a polymorphism in δ-aminolevulinate dehydratase gene which is associated with an altered susceptibility to lead poisoning, (2017).
- Dose escalation enzyme replacement therapy for treating acid sphingomyelinase deficiency, (2017).
- Compositions and methods for inhibiting expression of the ALAS1 gene, (2017).
- Dose escalation enzyme replacement therapy for treating acid sphingomyelinase deficiency, (2017).
- Materials and methods for identifying spinal muscular atrophy carriers, (2018).
- Compositions and methods for inhibiting expression of the ALAS1 gene, (2018).
- Compositions and methods for inhibiting expression of the ALAS1 gene, (2018).
- Dose escalation enzyme replacement therapy for treating acid sphingomyelinase deficiency, (2019).
- Compositions and methods for inhibiting expression of the ALAS1 gene, (2021).

== Books ==
- Desnick, R. J., Bernlohr, R. W. and Krivit, W., eds.: Enzyme Therapy in Genetic Diseases, Birth Defects Original Article Series. Vol. IX, No. 2. The National Foundation, New York, pp. 236, 1973. ISBN 0-683-06367-7
- Rubenstein, I., Phillips, R. L., Green, C. E. and Desnick, R. J., eds.: Molecular Genetic Modification of Eucaryotes, Academic Press, New York, pp. 171, 1977. ASIN B000N5X2F2
- Desnick, R. J., ed.: Enzyme Therapy in Genetic Diseases: 2, Alan R. Liss, Inc., New York, pp. 544, 1980. ISBN 0-8451-1035-7
- Desnick, R. J., Patterson, D. F. and Scarpelli, D. F., eds.: Animal Models of Inherited Metabolic Diseases. Alan R. Liss, Inc., New York, pp. 519, 1982. ASIN B0028IQ4KC
- Desnick, R. J., Gatt, S. and Grabowski, G. A., eds.: Gaucher Disease: A Century of Delineation and Research, Alan R. Liss, Inc., New York, pp. 740, 1982. ISBN 0-8451-0095-5
- Bishop, D. F. and Desnick, R. J., eds.: Assays of the Heme Biosynthetic Enzymes. Enzyme 28:1–232, 1982. ISBN 978-3-8055-3573-1
- Tada, K., Colombo, J. P. and Desnick, R. J., eds.: Recent Advances in Inborn Errors of Metabolism. Karger, Basel, pp. 332, 1987. ISBN 3-8055-4772-2
- Desnick, R. J., ed.: Treatment of Genetic Diseases, Churchill Livingstone, Inc., New York, pp. 331, 1991. ISBN 0-443-08773-3
- Desnick, R. J. and Kaback, M. M., eds.: Tay–Sachs Disease, Academic Press, pp. 1–360, 2001. ISBN 0-12-017644-0

== Publications ==
Partial list:

- Ziegler RJ, Cherry M, Barbon CM; et al. (March 2007). "Correction of the biochemical and functional deficits in fabry mice following AAV8-mediated hepatic expression of alpha-galactosidase A". Mol. Ther. 15 (3): 492–500. doi:10.1038/sj.mt.6300066. PMID 17191071.
- Germain DP, Waldek S, Banikazemi M; et al. (May 2007). "Sustained, long-term renal stabilization after 54 months of agalsidase beta therapy in patients with Fabry disease". J. Am. Soc. Nephrol. 18 (5): 1547–57. doi:10.1681/ASN.2006080816. PMID 17409312.
- Grace ME, Balwani M, Nazarenko I, Prakash-Cheng A, Desnick RJ (2007). "Type 1 Gaucher disease: Null and hypomorphic novel chitotriosidase mutations- implications for diagnosis and therapeutic monitoring". Hum. Mutat. 28 (9): 866–873. doi:10.1002/humu.20524. PMID 17464953.
- Desnick RJ (August 2007). "Prenatal diagnosis of Fabry disease". Prenat. Diagn. 27 (8): 693–4. doi:10.1002/pd.1767. PMID 17533632.
- Scott SA, Edelmann L, Kornreich R, Erazo M, Desnick RJ (2007). "CYP2C9, CYP2C19, and CYP2D6 allele frequencies in the Ashkenazi Jewish population". Pharmacogenomics. 8 (7): 721–730. doi:10.2217/14622416.8.7.721. PMID 18240905.
- Yasuda M, Domaradzki M, Bishop DF, Desnick RJ (2007). "Acute intermittent porphyria: Vector optimization for gene therapy". J. Gene Med. 9 (9): 806–911. doi:10.1002/jgm.1074. PMID 17654633.
- Cunha L, Kuti M, Bishop DF, Mezei M, Zeng L, Zhou MM, Desnick RJ (2008). "Human uroporphyrinogen III synthase: NMR-based mapping of the active site". Proteins. 71 (2): 855–873. doi:10.1002/prot.21755. PMID 18004775.
- Scott SA, Edelmann L, Kornreich R, Desnick RJ (2008). "Warfarin pharmacogenetics: CYP2C9 and VKORC1 genotype predict different sensitivities and resistance frequencies in the Ashkenazi and Sephardi Jewish populations". Am. J. Hum. Genet. 82 (2): 495–500. doi:10.1016/j.ajhg.2007.10.002. PMC 2427171. PMID 18252229.
- McGovern MM, Wasserstein MP, Giugliani R; et al. (August 2008). "A prospective, cross-sectional survey study of the natural history of Niemann-Pick disease type B". Pediatrics. 122 (2): e341–9. doi:10.1542/peds.2007-3016. PMC 2692309. PMID 18625664.
- Schiffmann R, Warnock DG, Banikazemi M; et al. (July 2009). "Fabry disease: progression of nephropathy, and prevalence of cardiac and cerebrovascular events before enzyme replacement therapy". Nephrol. Dial. Transplant. 24 (7): 2102–11. doi:10.1093/ndt/gfp031. PMC 2698092. PMID 19218538.
- Benjamin ER, Flanagan JJ, Schilling A; et al. (June 2009). "The pharmacological chaperone 1-deoxygalactonojirimycin increases alpha-galactosidase A levels in Fabry patient cell lines". J. Inherit. Metab. Dis. 32 (3): 424–40. doi:10.1007/s10545-009-1077-0. PMID 19387866.
- Hwu WL, Chien YH, Lee NC, Chiang SC, Huang AC, Yeh HY, Chao MC, Lin SJ, Kitagawa T, Hse LW, Desnick RJ, Hsu LW (2009). "Newborn screening for Fabry disease in Taiwan reveals a high incidence of the later-onset mutation, IVS4+919G>A". Hum. Mutat. 30 (10): 1397–405. doi:10.1002/humu.21074. PMC 2769558. PMID 19621417.
- Hillenkamp F, Karas M (1990). Mass spectrometry of peptides and proteins by matrix-assisted ultraviolet laser desorption/ionization. Meth. Enzymol. Vol. 193. pp. 280–95. doi:10.1016/0076-6879(90)93420-p. ISBN 978-0-12-182094-7. PMID 1963669.
- Galende E, Karakikes I, Edelmann L, Desnick RJ, Kerenyi T, Khoueiry G, Lafferty J, McGinn JT, Brodman M, Fuster V, Hajjar RJ, Polgar K (2010). "Amniotic fluid cells are more efficiently reprogrammed to pluripotency than adult cells". Cell Reprogram. 12 (2): 117–25. doi:10.1089/cell.2009.0077. PMC 2998987. PMID 20677926.
- Khanna R, Soska R, Lun Y; et al. (January 2010). "The pharmacological chaperone 1-deoxygalactonojirimycin reduces tissue globotriaosylceramide levels in a mouse model of Fabry disease". Mol. Ther. 18 (1): 23–33. doi:10.1038/mt.2009.220. PMC 2839206. PMID 19773742.
- Yasuda M, Bishop DF, Fowkes M, Cheng SH, Gan L, Desnick RJ (January 2010). "AAV8-mediated gene therapy prevents induced biochemical attacks of acute intermittent porphyria and improves neuromotor function". Mol. Ther. 18 (1): 17–22. doi:10.1038/mt.2009.250. PMC 2839207. PMID 19861948.
- Wozniak M, Kittner S, Tuhrim S, Cole J, Stern B, Dobbins M, Grace M, Nazarenko I, Dobrovolny R, McDade E, Desnick RJ (2010). "Frequency of unrecognized Fabry disease among young European-American and African-American men with first ischemic stroke". Stroke. 41 (1): 78–81. doi:10.1161/STROKEAHA.109.558320. PMC 3564050. PMID 20007919.
