= Prevention of autosomal recessive disorders =

Prevention of autosomal recessive disorders is focused on making it less likely that two carriers for the same hereditary disease will have children together.

== Background ==
Autosomal recessive pattern, showing how two unaffected carriers can have a child with the disease.

Some genetic disorders are caused by having two "bad" copies of a recessive allele. When the gene is located on an autosome (as opposed to a sex chromosome), it is possible for both men and women to be carriers. A child of two carriers has a 1/4 chance of being affected by the disorder.

Due to carriers being unaffected (or barely affected), the bad recessive alleles can persist in the gene pool for quite a while, even if the disorder is 100% lethal.

== Outbreeding ==
Most modern societies have laws regarding incest, with avoiding the genetic disorders caused by inbreeding as one of the major motivations.

Both social acceptance and legality of first-cousin marriage is mixed. Some jurisdictions narrowly tailor their laws to preventing inbreeding: in Maine, first cousins can marry with proof of genetic counseling, while in Arizona and several other states, first cousins can marry if they are old or infertile.

== Carrier testing ==
Carrier testing can help guide the decisions of couples who are at high risk, e.g.:

- Both of Jewish descent – Several disorders including Tay–Sachs disease. The organization Dor Yeshorim offers testing in many countries.
- Both Cypriot – Thalassemia. Testing is fully subsidized and mandated in both jurisdictions on Cyprus.
- Both Maldivian – Thalassemia. Testing is fully subsidized and mandated in the Maldives.
- Both from affected parts of Africa – Sickle-cell disease. Carrier testing is not widely available in many African countries and disease burden remains high.

Couples who learn that they are both carriers may decide to part ways, adopt, or use preimplantation genetic diagnosis to select unaffected embryos.

== Relation to eugenics ==
When a population is in Hardy–Weinberg equilibrium, the proportions of each genotype are directly determined by allele frequency as shown in this chart. Mate choice is one of the ways to move a population out of equilibrium, allowing genotype frequency to change even if the underlying allele frequencies remain constant.

These practices are not designed to change allele frequencies and therefore have little impact on future generations beyond the first. As a result, these practices are generally not considered to be a form of eugenics, despite overlapping goals.

== See also ==
- Disability-selective abortion – controversial alternative to prevention
