= Marc E. Rothenberg =

American physician-scientist

- Born: January 17, 1961 (age 65); Forest Hills, NY
- Education: Brandeis University; Harvard Medical School
- Title: Professor of Pediatrics; Director, Division of Allergy and Immunology at Cincinnati Children's Hospital Medical Center; Director, Cincinnati Center for Eosinophilic Disorders

Marc E. Rothenberg (born 1961) is an American physician-scientist who has made significant contributions to the fields of allergy, gastroenterology, and immunology. He is currently a Professor of Pediatrics, at Cincinnati Children's Hospital Medical Center, and the University of Cincinnati College of Medicine, the Director of the Division of Allergy and Immunology, the Director of the Cincinnati Center for Eosinophilic Disorders, and the principal investigator of the Consortium of Eosinophilic Disease Researchers (CEGIR) as part of the Rare Disease Clinical Research Network of the National Institute of Health. Rothenberg's research is focused on eosinophilic gastrointestinal diseases.

== Early life and education ==
Rothenberg was born in New York City in 1961. He received his Bachelor of Arts degree in Biochemistry and Chemistry from Brandeis University in 1983. His undergraduate years were influences by the renowned biochemist Professor William P. Jencks, who was Rothenberg’s early research mentor. He went on to earn his medical degree and PhD in Immunology from Harvard Medical School in 1990, conducting research under the mentorship of professor K. Frank Austen. He completed his residency in pediatrics at Boston Children's Hospital and his fellowship in Allergy and Immunology and Hematology at Boston Children’s Hospital and the Dana Farber Cancer Institute.

== Career ==
Rothenberg began his career as a faculty member at the University of Cincinnati College of Medicine and Cincinnati Children's Hospital Medical Center in 1996, where he has since remained. Rothenberg established the Cincinnati Center for Eosinophilic Disorders, a center focused on eosinophilic diseases.

In 2016, Rothenberg was the first recipient of the Denise and Dave Bunning Chair for Allergy and Immunology.

Rothenberg is also the current Director of the NIH-sponsored Consortium of Eosinophilic Gastrointestinal Disease Researchers, part of the Rare Diseases Clinical Research Network. In 2021, he was elected Co-Chair of the RDCRN.

== Research ==
The Rothenberg CURED Laboratory at Cincinnati Children's Hospital Medical Center conducts research focused on the molecular analysis of allergic inflammation, particularly the pathogenesis of eosinophilic gastrointestinal disorders. His research is credited with elucidating the mechanism of eosinophilia, including the identification of key checkpoints that are central targets for therapeutic intervention. These targets have been translated into developed clinical products. Rothenberg's research has included key proof-of-principle studies that provided the bases for a new class of drugs, anti-eosinophil therapeutics, as well as the first FDA approved drug for eosinophilic esophagitis.

== Awards and honors ==
Rothenberg has been recognized for his contributions to science and medicine with numerous honors and awards, including the American Academy of Allergy, Asthma, and Immunology (AAAAI) Distinguished Scientist Award, the National Institutes of Health (NIH) Merit Award, the E. Mead Johnson Award from the Society of Pediatric Research, and the Paul Ehrlich Award from the International Eosinophil Society. Rothenberg was also recognized as a Highly Cited Researcher in 2018 (Clarivate Analytics). He is an elected member of the American Society for Clinical Investigation, the Association of American Physicians and the National Academy of Medicine. In 2023, Rothenberg was awarded the Daniel Drake Medal for his impact on the field of Allergy and Immunology.

== Publications ==
Rothenberg has authored and co-authored over 500 peer-reviewed articles.
