= Responses to the COVID-19 pandemic in October 2022 =

Aspect of viral disease pandemic

This article documents the chronology of the response to the COVID-19 pandemic in October 2022, which originated in Wuhan, China in December 2019. Some developments may become known or fully understood only in retrospect. Reporting on this pandemic began in December 2019.

== Reactions and measures in South, East and Southeast Asia ==
=== 1 October ===
- China – China puts the city of Shenzhen on lockdown.

=== 5 October ===
- China – China bans residents from leaving Xinjiang.

== Reactions and measures in the Western Pacific ==
=== 18 October ===
- The New Zealand Government eliminated several of its COVID-19 emergency powers including its powers to implement lockdowns, managed isolation and quarantine (MIQ), border closures, vaccine passes and mandates. The Government however opted to retain the Act's provisions for seven-day isolation periods, mask use and border entry requirements until Parliament passed newer, general pandemic legislation. In addition, the Government revoked the Epidemic Notice, signalling a shift from emergency management to long-term management of COVID-19.
- New Zealand's COVID-19 Response Minister Chris Hipkins announced that the Government would hold a royal commission into its response to the COVID-19 pandemic.

== See also ==
- Timeline of the COVID-19 pandemic
- Timeline of the COVID-19 pandemic in October 2022
- Responses to the COVID-19 pandemic
