= Sallie Permar =

American pediatrician

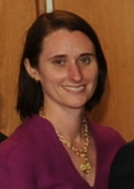
Permar after receiving the 2012 PECASE

Sallie Robey Permar is the pediatrician-in-chief at NewYork-Presbyterian / Weill Cornell Medical Center and the chair of the Department of Pediatrics at Weill Cornell Medicine. Her research focuses on infections affecting newborns.

== Education ==
Permar graduated with a BS in biology from Davidson College in 1997. In 2004, she earned an MD from Harvard Medical School and a PhD in microbiology and immunology from Johns Hopkins Bloomberg School of Public Health. She then did a pediatrics residency and a fellowship in pediatric infectious diseases at Boston Children's Hospital.

== Career ==
In 2011, Permar joined the faculty at Duke University School of Medicine as an assistant professor of pediatrics. She was promoted to associate professor in 2013.

Permar was the Wilburt C. Davison Distinguished Professor of pediatrics, immunology, and molecular genetics at Duke University School of Medicine, associate dean of physician-scientist development; and founding director of the Duke Medical's Children's Health and Discovery Institute. She is also a member of the Duke Global Health Institute.

On December 1, 2020, Dr. Permar was appointed chair of the Department of Pediatrics at Weill Cornell Medicine and the pediatrician-in-chief at NewYork-Presbyterian/Weill Cornell Medical Center and New York-Presbyterian Komansky Children's Hospital. As Pediatrician-in-Chief, Dr. Permar hosted the 13th Plates for Pediatrics Dinner on February 25, 2025. This event collected $2.5 million to fund pediatric programs such as the Pediatric Simulation Center, Residency Education, and Pediatric Mental Health.

Dr. Permar is an author of almost 150 scientific publications.

=== Awards ===
- 2012 New Innovator Award, National Institutes of Health
- 2012 Presidential Early Career Award in Science and Engineering (awarded in 2013)
- 2014 Young Investigator Award, Society for Pediatric Research
- 2015 Young Investigator Award, Pediatric Infectious Diseases Society
- 2020 E. Mead Johnson Award from the Society for Pediatric Research
- 2020 Gale and Ira Drukier Prize in Children's Health Research from Weill Cornell Medicine
- 2022 Excellence in Science Award, Federation of American Societies for Experimental Biology

She was elected to the American Society for Clinical Investigation in 2016.
