= Elizabeth Engle =

Professor of neurology and ophthalmology

Elizabeth C. Engle is a professor of neurology and ophthalmology at Harvard Medical School and a research associate at Boston Children's Hospital. She is an associate member of the Broad Institute. Her research focuses on developmental cranial nerve disorders.

== Early life and education ==
Engle is the daughter of two Ohio State University professors.

Engle earned a bachelor's degree from Middlebury College in 1980 and her M.D. from Johns Hopkins University School of Medicine. She then did a residency in pediatrics at Johns Hopkins University and a fellowship in neuropathology at Massachusetts General Hospital, before completing another residency in neurology at Longwood and Boston Children's Hospital.

After completing residency and fellowship, she did research in the laboratories of Louis M. Kunkel and Alan Beggs at Boston Children's Hospital.

== Career ==
Engle opened her laboratory at Children's in 1997 and began studying congenital cranial dysinnervation disorders.

At present, Engle is a professor of neurology and ophthalmology at Harvard Medical School. She is a research associate and member of the F.M. Kirby Neurobiology Center at Boston Children's Hospital. She is an associate member of the Broad Institute of Harvard and MIT.

Engle has been an HHMI investigator since 2008. She was elected to the National Academy of Medicine in 2019. She received the 2024 Bernard Sachs Award from the Child Neurology Society, "given annually to honor someone of international status who has done leading research in neuroscience with relevance to the care of children with neurological disorders."

== Personal life ==
Engle married Paul Dennehy in 2001, and they adopted a daughter from China.
