= Frank Oski =

American pediatrician (1932–1996)

- Born: June 17, 1932; Philadelphia
- Died: December 7, 1996 (aged 64); Baltimore, Maryland
- Medical career
- Profession: Medicine
- Field: Pediatrics
- Institutions: Johns Hopkins School of Medicine
- Sub-specialties: Pediatric hematology
- Awards: E. Mead Johnson Award (1972)

Frank Aram Oski (June 17, 1932 – December 7, 1996) was an American pediatrician. After holding several faculty positions at medical schools, he spent several years as the chair of pediatrics at Johns Hopkins School of Medicine. He was the founder and editor of the journal Contemporary Pediatrics, and he edited one of the most widely read textbooks in pediatrics.

== Biography ==
=== Early life ===
Oski was a native of Philadelphia. When he was young, he was turned off by the personalities of physicians and instead wanted to become a sportswriter or announcer. He graduated from Swarthmore College and the University of Pennsylvania School of Medicine. Oski's postgraduate training in pediatrics and hematology was completed in Boston.

=== Career ===
He returned to Penn for several years as a faculty member before becoming the chairman of pediatrics at Upstate Medical Center at the State University of New York in Syracuse. In 1985, Oski was made the chairman of pediatrics and was appointed to chair the pediatric department at Johns Hopkins School of Medicine. He also served as the physician-in-chief at the Johns Hopkins Children's Medical and Surgery Center. He was a founder and editor of the journal Contemporary Pediatrics and was known as an expert in pediatric nutrition issues and blood disorders.

Oski wrote 300 journal articles and 20 books, including The Practical Pediatrician, a guide for parents. He also co-wrote the first textbook focused on blood disorders in newborns. He was an editor of Principles and Practice of Pediatrics, a popular pediatric textbook. The fourth edition of Oski's Pediatrics was published in 2006.

He held the presidency for both the Society for Pediatric Research and the American Pediatric Society. He was a 1972 recipient of the E. Mead Johnson Award for excellence in pediatric research.

=== Anti-milk ===
Oski was a notable proponent of the anti-milk movement in the United States. In 1977, he wrote a book called Don't Drink Your Milk!. Working with pediatrician Benjamin Spock, he issued messages criticizing the nutritional value of cow's milk.

=== Later life and legacy ===
Oski died of prostate cancer in 1996. He had retired from Johns Hopkins the year before his death. He was survived by a wife and three children. The American Society of Pediatric Hematology/Oncology sponsors the Frank A. Oski Lectureship to honor his memory. Upstate Golisano Children's Hospital named its pediatric intensive care unit after Oski.
