= Elaine Tuomanen =

American biologist

Elaine I. Tuomanen
- Born: January 23, 1951 (age 75)
- Known for: Infectious disease

Elaine I. Tuomanen is an American pediatrician and chair of the Department of Infectious Diseases at St. Jude Children's Research Hospital. She is noted for her research on Molecular pathogenesis of Streptococcus pneumoniae.

== Career ==
Elaine Tuomanen received her M.D. from McGill University. She is a member of the Association of American Physicians and a Fellow of the American Academy for Microbiology. At St. Jude's Research Hospital, she focuses on the pathogenesis of infectious diseases in children, which can be seen in her initiatives of the Children's GMP Manufacturing Facility and the Translational Trials Unit. Among her influential contributions are studies that link pneumococcal virulence factors to specific host receptors, the inflammatory bioactivities of cell wall, and the increased susceptibility of children with sickle cell disease to pneumococcal disease. Her studies have been funded by the National Institutes of Health for over 30 years, and she has authored hundreds of peer-reviewed publications, reviews, and book chapters.

=== Recent publications ===
- Bacterial Peptidoglycan Transverses the Placenta to Induce Fetal Neuroproliferation and Aberrant Postnatal Behavior.
- Correlation Between the Interval of Influenza Virus Infectivity and Results of Diagnostic Assays in a Ferret Model.
- Streptococcus pneumoniae translocates into the myocardium and forms unique microlesions that disrupt cardiac function.

=== Awards ===
- 1980 Bristol Award, The American Society for Infectious Diseases
- 1987 Outstanding Young Woman of America
- 1983-1986 Parker B. Francis Research Award, The American Thoracic Society
- 1986 Vector Outstanding Young Investigator Research Award, American Society for Microbiology
- 1997 E. Mead Johnson Award of American Academy of Pediatrics, Outstanding Research in Pediatrics
- 1998 Maxwell Finland Award from Infectious Diseases Society of America
- 2006 Selected as one of "America's Top Pediatricians"
- 2010 Fellow of the American Academy of Microbiology
- 2012 Member of the Association of American Physicians
- 2014 The inaugural Pediatric Infectious Diseases Society (PIDS) Distinguished Research Award
