= Dimmer (surname) =

Dimmer is a surname. Notable people with the surname include:

- Camille Dimmer (born 1939), Luxembourgish footballer and politician
- John Dimmer (1883–1918), British World War I veteran
- John Dimmer (born 1954 or 1955), Australian rules football coach and player
