= Markus Grompe =

American professor, pediatric physician, and genetic researcher

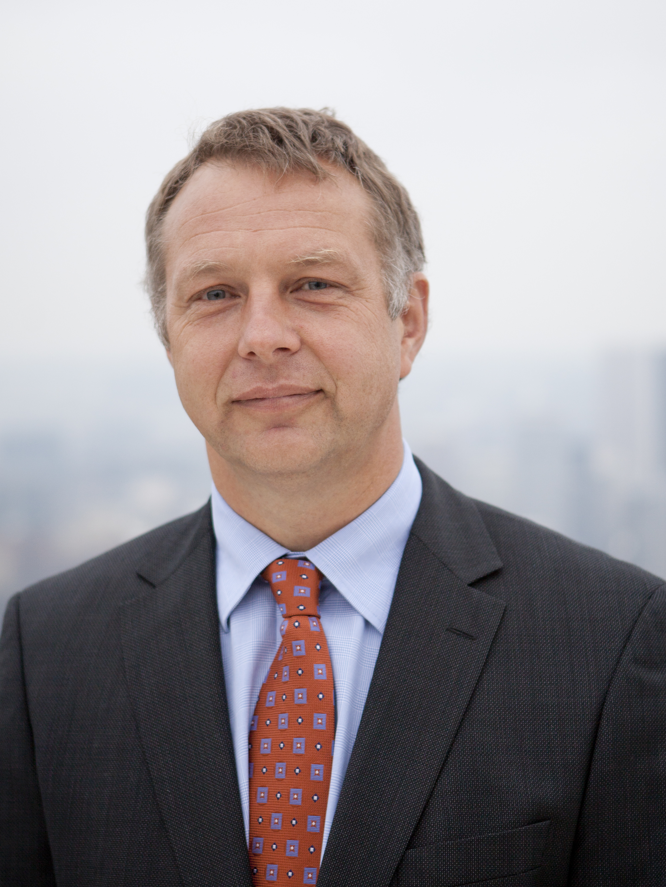
Markus Grompe, 2016

Markus Grompe is a professor of pediatrics and practicing physician at Oregon Health & Science University (OHSU) since 1991. Since 2004, he has been director of the Oregon Stem Cell Center at OHSU. Until 2018, he was also director of the Papé Family Pediatric Research Institute, Vice Chair for research in the OHSU department of Pediatrics, and holder of the Ray Hickey Endowed Chair at Doernbecher Children's Hospital.

Grompe is a specialist in hepatology and stem cell biology, and is known for the development of the "Fah mouse model", a transgenic mouse with an inactivating mutation (exon 5 deletion) in sequence encoding fumarylacetoacetate hydrolase (Fah). This mouse strain has been a useful model of Type I tyrosinemia, a human genetic disease caused by inactivating mutations in the Fah gene. The mice have been used to model diseases such as malaria and to optimize human gene therapy strategies.

Dr. Grompe has made major contributions to the study of Fanconi anemia, a rare hematological (blood-related) deficiency. His contributions have helped to reveal the role of the FANC protein complexes associated with the repair of double-stranded breaks in genomic DNA. His laboratory has made advances in the discovery of drugs for the chemoprevention of cancer in Fanconi anemia. He was involved in the establishment of the Fanconi Anemia Research Materials repository, which helps to facilitate Fanconi anemia research through the distribution of antibodies and cell lines free of charge to interested investigators.

In 2007, Grompe founded Yecuris Corporation, which distributes mice with "humanized" livers to pharmaceutical and biotech companies for pre-clinical research in infectious liver diseases, liver gene therapy, and drug metabolism.

In 2016, he co-founded Ambys Medicines, which develops treatments for advanced liver disease through enhancement or regeneration of hepatocyte activity. In 2021, he was appointed Chief Scientific Officer of Ambys.

== Education ==
Grompe earned his medical degree at the University of Ulm, then studied pediatrics at OHSU. He also completed a fellowship in molecular genetics at Baylor College of Medicine.

== See also ==
- R. Ellen Magenis
