= Harvey R. Colten =

American pediatric immunologist

Harvey Radin Colten (January 11, 1939 – May 24, 2007) was an American immunologist.

== Early life and education ==
Born in Houston, he received his undergraduate degree from Cornell University and his medical degree from Western Reserve University (now Case Western Reserve University) in 1963.

== Career ==
Colten initially taught at George Washington University before moving to Harvard University as an assistant professor of pediatrics in 1970, eventually becoming a full professor in 1979.

In 1986, Colten joined Washington University in St. Louis as a professor of pediatrics and molecular microbiology and also served as the chair of the pediatrics department.

In 1991, Colten became the treasurer of the American Association of Immunologists where he served until 1997.

From 1997 to 1999, he was the dean and vice president for medical affairs at Northwestern University.

During the 1960s, Colten's research at the National Cancer Institute focused on complement proteins, crucial components of the immune system. In the 1990s, while at Washington University, he led a team that identified the gene responsible for producing pulmonary surfactant protein B, vital for lung function.

In 2002, Colten was appointed vice president and senior associate dean for translational research at Columbia University.

== Awards and recognition ==
- 1979: E. Mead Johnson Award for Pediatric Research from the Society for Pediatric Research
