= Carrier testing =

Carrier testing is a type of genetic testing that is used to determine if a person is a carrier for specific autosomal recessive diseases or X-linked disorders. This kind of testing is used most often by couples who are considering becoming pregnant to determine the risks of their child inheriting one of these genetic disorders.

== Background ==
Genes come in pairs; one from the mother and one from the father. A carrier is a person who inherited one abnormal gene from one of their parents. Carriers often show no symptoms of the genetic disorder that they carry an abnormal gene for. Usually the only time a person finds out that they are a carrier for a specific genetic disorder is when they have an affected child. In order for offspring to inherit an autosomal recessive disease, two copies of the abnormal gene are needed. This means that both of the parents have to be a carrier for the child to inherit the disease. In instances in which both parents are carriers of an autosomal recessive genetic defect, any offspring have a 25% chance of being affected, a 50% of being a healthy carrier, and a 25% chance of not inheriting any copies of the defective gene. If a woman is a carrier of an X-linked disorder, a male partner does not need to have a defective gene in order for affected offspring to be produced. Even if she partners with a genetically normal male, all male offspring have 50% chance of being affected, while female offspring are typically unaffected, though they have a 50% chance of being carriers.

== Reasons for testing ==
The most common reason for carrier testing to allow future parents to find out if they are a carrier for a genetic disorder, usually in order to prevent the conception or birth of an affected child. Carrier testing can be done before or during the pregnancy. Most genetic diseases included on carrier screening are life-limiting, fatal, or cause disability.

== Tiers of Screening ==
There are fours tiers of carrier screening. Tier 1 is the most basic tier. It tests for Cystic Fibrosis, Spinal Muscular Atrophy, race-linked conditions among high-risk populations, and sometimes fragile X syndrome.

Tier 2 tests for all severe autosomal-recessive and X-linked disorders with a carrier prevalence of more than 1 in 100, including all disorders tested for in Tier 1. The American College of Obstetricians and Gynecologists recommends that Tier 2 testing be offered to all patients considering pregnancy, trying to conceive, or currently pregnant.

Tier 3 testing detects severe autosomal-recessive and X-linked disorders with a carrier prevalence of more than 1 in 200, including those covered in Tier 2, covering 113 conditions (97 autosomal recessive genetic disorders and 16 severe X-linked conditions). The American College of Medical Genetics and Genomics recommends Tier 3 testing be offered to all patients considering pregnancy, trying to conceive, or currently pregnant.

Tier 4 is the most comprehensive tier. It covers hundreds of ultra-rare genetic disorders, with some Tier 4 panels testing for nearly 800 conditions. It is not routinely recommended unless there is a medical indication, such if the couple is consanguineous or if there is family history of ultra-rare genetic diseases.

== Autosomal recessive disorders/diseases ==
There are thousands of recessive genetic disorders, most of which are very rare. Certain genetic disorders tend to be more common in people of a particular ethnicity. For example, people of African American ethnicity have a much higher likelihood of being a carrier for the autosomal recessive disorder called sickle cell anemia. People of one ethnicity in particular, Ashkenazi Jewish, have a tendency to be carriers for a wide variety of recessive genetic disorders. There are also several recessive disorders that are present at similar rates in all ethnicities, such as fragile X syndrome, and spinal muscular atrophy.

== Testing methods ==
Carrier testing is most often done through a simple blood test. The results from these tests are usually available anywhere between two and eight weeks depending on where the testing is conducted.

Some tests may screen for one or a few genetic conditions, and other tests may screen for hundreds. For example, in Australia, multiple companies offer carrier screening tests for the carrier status of three genes, whereas an extended screen is available that looks for variations in 552 genes.

An alternative method of testing, available for some conditions, analyzes gene products that are usually present in a person that keeps the genetic disorder from occurring. An affected person with the disorder would have close to a hundred percent reduction of the gene products compared to an unaffected person. A carrier would only have a fifty percent reduction in those gene products.

== Risks involved ==
The physical risks for getting this kind of genetic testing done are very minimal. The most common requirement is a blood sample. The emotional risks on the other hand are great. When a person finds out they are a carrier for a specific genetic disorder, dealing with that can be very difficult. In many cases, people who find out they are carries can become angered or even enraged that they carry a genetic defect that could be passed on to their child. These results can play a role in determining if a couple will have a child together. If both parents are carriers for the same genetic disorder, there is a twenty-five percent chance that any child they have could be affected. When a person finds out they are a carrier, they are always encouraged to talk to a genetic counselor. If both partners are carriers for the same genetic disease, the choice to have a child together can become much more difficult. IVF with preimplantation genetic diagnosis may be considered, to remove the risk of having an affected child.

== See also ==
- Prevention of autosomal recessive disorders
