= Willard M. Wallace =

American history professor (1911–2000)

Willard Mosher Wallace (1911 – June 15, 2000) was an American historian who taught at Wesleyan University from 1945 to 1981.

He attended Wesleyan University, where he received bachelor's and master's degrees, and the University of Pennsylvania, where he received a PhD in history. He won a Guggenheim fellowship.

At the end of his full-time teaching at Wesleyan, Wallace was made Professor Emeritus.

He was a member of the Acorn Club, to which he was elected in 1974.

== Works ==
- Traitorous Hero: The Life and Fortunes of Benedict Arnold (1954), reviewed at "Traitorous Hero"
- Sir Walter Raleigh (1959)
- East to Bagaduce (1963)
- Appeal to Arms: A Military History of the American Revolution (1964)
- "American Revolution" author in the Encyclopædia Britannica, published online 20 July 1998
- "United States" contributing editor, Encyclopedia Britannica online 26 October 1998
