= Jordan S. Orange =

American pediatric immunologist

Academic background
- Education: A.B. Biology, Brown University; PhD, 1996, MD, 1997, Alpert Medical School
- Thesis: IL-12 and viral infections (1996)

Jordan Scott Orange is an American pediatric immunologist. Orange is credited with defining a new class of diseases known as natural killer cell deficiencies.

== Early life and education ==
Orange completed his Bachelor's degree, PhD, and medical degree from Brown University and conducted his residency training at the Children's Hospital of Philadelphia (CHOP), clinical fellowship at Boston Children's Hospital, and a post-doctoral research fellowship at Harvard University. While at Brown University, he discovered that natural killer cells produce cytokines to participate in defending the body against viruses. His thesis, published in 1996, was titled "IL-12 and viral infections."

== Career ==
Following his residency and fellowships, Orange accepted a faculty position at the Perelman School of Medicine at the University of Pennsylvania. During his tenure, he also worked at CHOP where he focused on Wiskott–Aldrich syndrome. Orange continued his research stemming from his graduate studies and developed a novel therapy that bypasses the natural killer cell defect. As a result of his contributions to research and treatment of inherited immune deficiency diseases, Orange received the 2009 American Philosophical Society Judson Daland Prize. The following year, he collaborated with German researcher Christoph Klein to perform cell imaging and analysis on children diagnosed with WAS soon after birth. They collected some of their hematopoietic stem cells and then transferred normal WAS genes into those cells and returned the cells to the children's bloodstreams. Due to his studies, Orange was elected a member of the American Society for Clinical Investigation.

Orange eventually left the University of Pennsylvania in 2012 to join the faculty at Baylor College of Medicine (BCM) and serve as chief of Immunology, Allergy and Rheumatology and director of the Center for Human Immunobiology at Texas Children's Hospital. He remained in Houston until 2018 when he joined the faculty at Columbia University Vagelos College of Physicians and Surgeons as their chair of pediatrics and pediatrician-in-chief at Morgan Stanley Children's Hospital. In his final year at BCM, Orange was the recipient of the 2018 Edith and Peter O'Donnell Award in Medicine from the Academy of Medicine, Engineering and Science of Texas.

Upon joining the faculty at Columbia, Orange was elected to the National Academy of Medicine for his contributions to medical science, health care, and public health. During the COVID-19 pandemic, Orange wrote an op-ed on Stat calling for adults to "put children's health first."
