= Michael Kaback =

American geneticist

Michael M. Kaback is an American geneticist, physician, and Professor of Pediatrics and Reproductive Medicine, and chief of the Division of Medical Genetics, at the University of California–San Diego.

He is best known for his role in the discovery and development of an enzyme activity assay method (HEX A) of screening for heterozygotes ("carriers") of the genetic DNA mutations which are found in affected infants (homozygotes) with Tay–Sachs disease (TSD), a rare and fatal genetic disorder. Both parents of an affected child would be expected to be "carriers" of one of the several DNA mutations associated with his disorder. This test allowed for cost-effective screening of large populations, particularly among adult Jewish individuals of European origin. This was the first such test in medical genetics, as no large scale genetic screening for "carriers" of a recessively transmitted fatal disease had ever been done before, Kaback became involved in public health aspects of screening, including the education of target populations and genetic counseling. Although no cure for Tay–Sachs disease has been found, antenatal genetic screening has virtually eliminated the disease in the Ashkenazi Jewish population in the United States, Canada, and Israel.

In 1979, Kaback served on the first National Institutes of Health (NIH) panel to recommend antenatal diagnosis in cases where a couple might be at risk for conceiving a child with a hereditary disease or congenital defect. The panel brought together physicians, scientists, consumers, and others in order to develop a consensus statement for use by healthcare providers. In the NIH Consensus Development Program, panel members are selected for their expertise to serve as judges of evidence, and must have no prior conflicts of interest. Panel members addressed issues concerning the relative risks and benefits of genetic screening, including the costs and risks of the screening procedures themselves. It was the first NIH panel to provide recommendations for genetic screening, and its findings have since been revised many times.

== Selected publications ==
- Robert J. Desnick and Michael M. Kaback (editors). Tay Sachs Disease. Academic Press, 2001. ISBN 0-12-017644-0.
- Kaback, Michael M. (2001). "The 'Asilomar Process' and the Human Genome Project." Perspectives in Biology and Medicine Vol 44:2. Johns Hopkins University Press. pp. 230–234.
- Kaback, Michael M. (1993) et al. "Tay Sachs Disease — Carrier Screening, Prenatal Diagnosis, and the Molecular Era: An International Perspective, 1970 to 1993." Journal of the American Medical Association Vol 270:19 pp. 2307–2315.
