= Rochelle Walensky =

American medical scientist (born 1969)

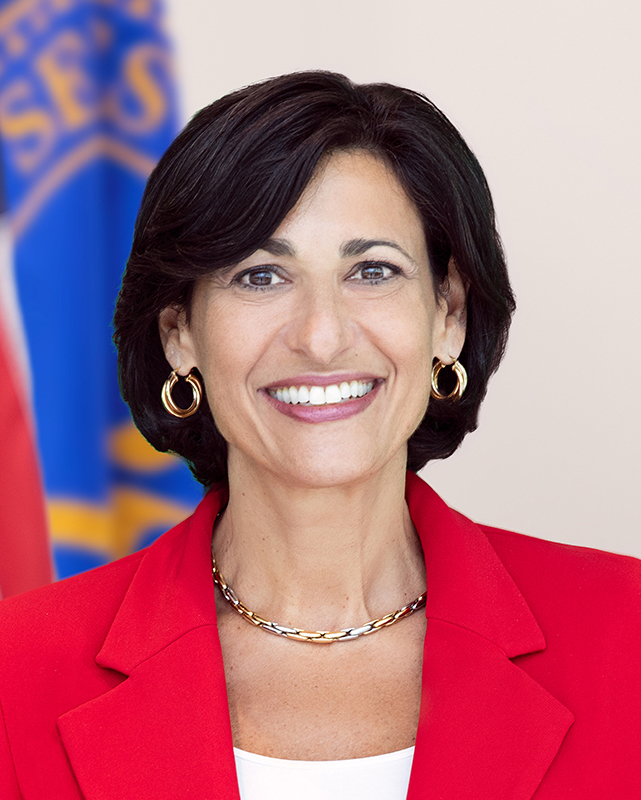
- Official portrait, 2021

19th Director of the Centers for Disease Control and Prevention
- In office January 20, 2021 – June 30, 2023
- President: Joe Biden
- Deputy: Anne Schuchat; Debra Houry (acting); Nirav D. Shah
- Preceded by: Robert Redfield
- Succeeded by: Mandy Cohen

Personal details
- Born: Rochelle Paula Bersoff; April 5, 1969 (age 57) Peabody, Massachusetts, U.S.
- Spouse: Loren D. Walensky (m. 1995)
- Children: 3
- Parent: Edward H. Bersoff (father)
- Education: Washington University in St. Louis (BA); Johns Hopkins University (MD); Harvard University (MPH)

Rochelle Paula Walensky (née Bersoff; born April 5, 1969) is an American physician-scientist who served as the 19th director of the U.S. Centers for Disease Control and Prevention (CDC) from 2021 to 2023 and also administered the Agency for Toxic Substances and Disease Registry in her capacity as CDC director. On May 5, 2023, she announced her resignation, effective June 30, 2023. Prior to her appointment at the CDC, she had served as the chief of the Division of Infectious Diseases at Massachusetts General Hospital and a professor of medicine at Harvard Medical School. Walensky is an expert on HIV/AIDS.

== Early life and education ==
Walensky was born Rochelle Paula Bersoff in Peabody, Massachusetts, to Edward Bersoff and Carol Bersoff-Bernstein. Her family is Jewish. She was raised in Potomac, Maryland. Walensky graduated high school from Winston Churchill High School in 1987.

In 1991, Walensky received a Bachelor of Arts in biochemistry and molecular biology from Washington University in St. Louis. In 1995, she received a Doctor of Medicine from Johns Hopkins School of Medicine. From 1995 to 1998, she trained in internal medicine at Johns Hopkins Hospital. Walensky then became a fellow in the Massachusetts General Hospital/Brigham and Women's Hospital Infectious Diseases Fellowship Program. In 2001, she earned a M.P.H. in clinical effectiveness from the Harvard School of Public Health.

== Academic career ==
Walensky had been on the faculty of Harvard Medical School since 2001, first as an instructor and then she ascended the ranks to become professor in 2012. Walensky was a professor of medicine at Harvard Medical School from 2012 to 2020, and served as chief of the division of infectious diseases at Massachusetts General Hospital from 2017 to 2020. She conducted research that used the methods of decision science, Monte Carlo mathematical simulation and cost-effectiveness analyses to promote access to HIV care in the US and internationally. Walensky worked to improve HIV screening and care in South Africa, led health policy initiatives, and researched clinical trial design and evaluation in a variety of settings. With over 300 publications, her work is heavily cited in the field of HIV policy. She is also the recipient of an National Institutes of Health MERIT award (Method To Extend Research in Time) Award (R37).

Walensky was chair of the Office of AIDS Research Advisory Council at the National Institutes of Health from 2014 to 2015 and served as a member of the US Department of Health and Human Services Panel on Antiretroviral Guidelines for Adults and Adolescents since 2011. She was serving on the board of directors of Mass General Brigham at the time of her departure for CDC. She has been co-director of the Medical Practice Evaluation Center at Massachusetts General Hospital since 2011. She was inducted into the National Academy of Medicine in 2021.

Since leaving CDC, Walensky has been a lecturer on Law at Harvard Law School and a Senior Fellow at the Women and Public Policy Program, Harvard Kennedy School. She is currently serving on the board of trustees at the Doris Duke Foundation and The Carter Center.

=== COVID-19 ===
Walensky was among the first to sign the John Snow Memorandum in October 2020 as a critical response to the Great Barrington Declaration.

Early in the pandemic and prior to vaccine availability, she used model-based analyses to demonstrate how SARS screening strategies could be used to safely reopen college campuses. She also conducted research on vaccine delivery and strategies to reach underserved communities. In a paper published in Health Affairs in November 2020, Walensky and her co-authors showed that the effectiveness of a COVID-19 vaccine will be strongly affected by:

- The speed with which the vaccine is produced and administered. Some of the potential vaccines have logistical challenges including the need for ultra-cold storage or requiring two doses.
- The willingness of people to be vaccinated.
- The pandemic's severity when the vaccine is introduced.

== CDC director ==
President-elect Joe Biden announced Walensky's presumptive appointment as CDC director on December 7, 2020, during the presidential transition. Doctors and public health experts widely praised the choice. As the position of director of the CDC does not require Senate confirmation to take office, Walensky's tenure at the CDC began on January 20, 2021.

On August 3, 2021, Walensky instituted a 60-day extension of a federal COVID-related ban, which had just expired, on landlords evicting their tenants. The extended ban applied only to "counties experiencing substantial and high levels of community transmission levels", but under the criteria of the ban this covered an area holding 90% of the U.S. population. On August 26, as was widely expected, the U.S. Supreme Court struck down the extension as unconstitutional, ruling that only the U.S. Congress had the authority to issue such a moratorium.

As the pandemic entered the Omicron variant wave, Walensky acknowledged that officials on the CDC response team were burned out, and tried to reassign workers. Walensky and other top officials had a plan to dissolve large parts of the pandemic response team, which has more than 1,500 staffers, and reassign members to their original posts. Walensky shelved the plan with the emergence of Omicron as cases began to tick up across the U.S., bringing morale lower than ever at the CDC. However, Ashish Jha says, "Dr. Walensky inherited a really messy organization with some real strengths but also a lot of problems."

In a January 18, 2022 interview with The Boston Globe Walensky responded to some of the criticisms of her first year in office.

Her critics told the Globe that she has confused the public on issues like quarantine guidance, school reopening, and mask-wearing. "What we're seeing is policy failures, accompanied by poor messaging," said Anne N. Sosin, a public health researcher at Dartmouth College, who added that the rest of the administration is also to blame. Critics said that the CDC was prioritizing the economy over public health. The American Medical Association criticized her December 27 guidance to shorten the COVID isolation period from ten to five days and to let people who contracted COVID leave isolation without a negative test. Former CDC Director Dr. Tom Frieden commented on her messaging around the change in guidance, saying "I think the way they were released was very problematic."

Walensky described her critics as "naysayers" who have helped sow the public confusion she has been accused of creating and pointing out that many Americans are still not following the most basic guidance on COVID-19 prevention. She also said, "We're making decisions in imperfect times, sometimes without all the data that we would like to make them." Walensky said she is working with a messaging coach and she is listening to her critics. She said that better communication is not always possible. "Some of this is not based on the messaging because, 'Wear a mask' is about as crystal clear as you could be. And still we have much of America not doing it. So some of the really easy stuff is not being followed, and some of the harder stuff is actually complicated science."

During a January 26, 2022 news conference about the rise of the Omicron variant and high hospitalization rates, Dr. Walensky said the nation should not ease up on COVID-19 safety protocols, saying, "Milder does not mean mild and we cannot look past the strain on our health systems and substantial number of deaths." She also said, "It's important to remember we're still facing a high overall burden of disease."

In April 2022, Dr. Walensky announced CDC was undergoing an external review following its mishandling of the pandemic. On August 17, 2022, she delivered a sweeping rebuke of her agency's handling of the coronavirus pandemic, saying it had failed to respond quickly enough and needed to be overhauled.

On October 22, 2022, Dr. Walensky tested positive for COVID-19.

On November 29, 2022, Dr. Walensky marked the 50th year of the Tuskegee Syphilis Study, and said that she would be meeting with colleagues and leaders in public health the following day, with a commitment to "ethical research & practice". Her comments that the 623 African-American study participants would be honored for their "suffering & sacrifice" was criticized by social media users, including those within Black Twitter, and other commentators as racist, while some users came to the defense of Walensky. Walensky later tweeted, on November 30, that she reflected on the Tuskegee study, that the men who were subjects in the study were "honored", that "their pain & that of their families" was acknowledged, and stated that the legacy of the study's participants "lives on...[and] must never be forgotten."

On May 5, 2023, Dr. Walensky announced her resignation from her role at the CDC, effective June 30, 2023. Her decision came as the Biden administration was preparing to end the nation's national health emergency status around COVID, and she was one of multiple administration officials to leave after working on the pandemic.

== Personal life ==
Walensky is married to Loren D. Walensky, also a physician-scientist. They have three sons. They are Jewish and members of Temple Emanuel in Newton, Massachusetts.

== Selected works and publications ==
- Paltiel, A. David; Weinstein, Milton C.; Kimmel, April D.; Seage, George R.; Losina, Elena; Zhang, Hong; Freedberg, Kenneth A.; Walensky, Rochelle P. (February 10, 2005). "Expanded Screening for HIV in the United States — An Analysis of Cost-Effectiveness". New England Journal of Medicine. 352 (6): 586–595. doi:10.1056/NEJMsa042088. PMID 15703423. Wikidata ()
- Walensky, Rochelle P.; Paltiel, A. David; Losina, Elena; Mercincavage, Lauren M.; Schackman, Bruce R.; Sax, Paul E.; Weinstein, Milton C.; Freedberg, Kenneth A. (July 2006). "The Survival Benefits of AIDS Treatment in the United States". The Journal of Infectious Diseases. 194 (1): 11–19. doi:10.1086/505147. PMID 16741877. Wikidata ()
- Schackman, Bruce R.; Gebo, Kelly A.; Walensky, Rochelle P.; Losina, Elena; Muccio, Tammy; Sax, Paul E.; Weinstein, Milton C.; Seage, George R.; Moore, Richard D.; Freedberg, Kenneth A. (November 2006). "The Lifetime Cost of Current Human Immunodeficiency Virus Care in the United States" (PDF). Medical Care. 44 (11): 990–997. doi:10.1097/01.MLR.0000228021.89490.2A. PMID 17063130. S2CID 21175266. Archived from the original (PDF) on February 1, 2017. Wikidata ()
- Dugdale, Caitlin M; Anahtar, Melis N; Chiosi, John J; Lazarus, Jacob E; McCluskey, Suzanne M; Ciaranello, Andrea L; Gogakos, Tasos; Little, Brent P; Branda, John A; Shenoy, Erica S; Walensky, Rochelle P; Zachary, Kimon C; Hooper, David C; Turbett, Sarah E; Hyle, Emily P (November 24, 2020). "Clinical, laboratory, and radiologic characteristics of patients with initial false-negative SARS-CoV-2 nucleic acid amplification test results". Open Forum Infectious Diseases. 8 (1) ofaa559. doi:10.1093/ofid/ofaa559. PMC 7717411. PMID 34164560.
- Sacks, Chana A.; Dougan, Michael; McCoy, Thomas H.; Zheng, Amy; Buonomo, Giancarlo; North, Crystal M.; Metlay, Joshua P.; Walensky, Rochelle P. (December 2020). "The Association Between Symptoms and COVID-19 Test Results Among Healthcare Workers". Annals of Surgery. 272 (6): e329–e332. doi:10.1097/SLA.0000000000004483. PMC 7668333. PMID 32941277. Wikidata ()
- Goldstein, Robert H.; Walensky, Rochelle P. (December 1, 2020). "The Challenges Ahead With Monoclonal Antibodies: From Authorization to Access". JAMA. 324 (21): 2151–2152. doi:10.1001/JAMA.2020.21872. PMID 33175110. Wikidata

Government offices
Preceded by Robert R. Redfield	19th Director of the Centers for Disease Control and Prevention; 2021–2023	Succeeded by Nirav D. Shah (acting)
