= American Society of Gene and Cell Therapy =

Medical society

American Society of Gene & Cell Therapy (ASGCT) is a professional non-profit medical and scientific organization based in Milwaukee, dedicated to understanding, development and application of gene, related cell and nucleic acid therapies, as well as promotion of professional and public education on gene therapy. With more than 4,800 members in the United States and worldwide, today ASGCT is the largest association of individuals involved in gene and cell therapy research.

Molecular Therapy is the official journal of the ASGCT.
