= Loren D. Walensky =

American physician-scientist and pediatric oncologist

- Education: Princeton University (BS); Johns Hopkins University (MD, PhD)
- Spouse: Rochelle Walensky (m. 1995)
- Children: 3
- Scientific career
- Institutions: Dana–Farber Cancer Institute; Harvard Medical School

Loren David Walensky is an American physician-scientist and pediatric oncologist at the Dana–Farber Cancer Institute since 2003 and a professor of pediatrics at the Dana–Farber/Harvard Cancer Center. He researches peptides and oncogenic pathways. In 2013, Walensky became director of the joint MD/PhD program at Harvard Medical School. He is the husband of Rochelle Walensky, former director of the Centers for Disease Control and Prevention.

== Education ==
Loren David Walensky graduated from Millburn High School, Essex County, New Jersey, in 1986. While in high school, he attended the precollege program of the Manhattan School of Music on a piano scholarship. In 1990, Walensky completed a bachelor's degree in chemistry from Princeton University and a certificate in science policy from the Princeton School of Public and International Affairs. He was the valedictorian. Walensky graduated from Johns Hopkins School of Medicine with a Ph.D. and M.D. in 1997. Walensky completed a residency in pediatrics and a fellowship in pediatric hematology-oncology at Dana-Farber and Boston Children's Hospital.

== Personal life ==
Walensky married physician-scientist Rochelle Walensky in 1995. They have three sons. They are Jewish and members of Temple Emanuel in Newton, Massachusetts.
