= Frederick Drimmer =

American historian

Frederick Drimmer (August 7, 1916 – December 24, 2000) was an American author, best known for his explorations of the bizarre and macabre. His Very Special People was about famous sideshow performers and the deformed, such as the conjoined twins Giacomo and Giovanni Battista Tocci. He also wrote The Elephant Man, a book about Joseph Merrick, who suffered from Proteus Syndrome, and Until You are Dead..., concerning the history of executions in the United States.

Born in Brooklyn, Drimmer received a bachelor's degree from City College of New York and a master's degree from Columbia University. He served in the Navy during World War II. He also taught at Norwalk Community College and City College of New York.

== Bibliography ==
- Drimmer, Frederick (1973). Very special people: the struggles, loves, and triumphs of human oddities. Amjon Publishers. ISBN 9780907934004.
- Drimmer, Frederick, Compiler. A Friend Is Someone Special. Norwalk, Connecticut: The C.R. Gibson Company Publishers, ISBN 0-8378-2101-0, 1975.
  - Drimmer, Frederick, Daughters of Eve.
  - Drimmer, Frederick. In Search of Eden
- Drimmer, Frederick (1 August 1985). Captured by the Indians: 15 firsthand accounts, 1750-1870. Courier Dover Publications. ISBN 978-0-486-24901-8.
- Drimmer, Frederick (September 1985). The Elephant Man. Putnam. ISBN 978-0-399-21262-8. OCLC 11599107.
- Drimmer, Frederick (1 May 1991). Born Different: Amazing Stories of Very Special People. Bantam Books. ISBN 978-0-553-15897-7. OCLC 17105334.
- Drimmer, Frederick (1 July 1992). Until You Are Dead: The Book of Executions in America. Kensington Publishing Corporation. ISBN 9781558176188.
