= Kamyar Kalantar-Zadeh =

American medical researcher (born 1963)

- Born: October 10, 1963 (age 62)
- Education: University of Bonn, University of Erlangen-Nuremberg, University of California, Berkeley
- Known for: Reverse epidemiology, nutrition in Kidney disease, incremental dialysis
- Scientific career
- Fields: Nephrology, dialysis, epidemiology, nutrition, internal medicine, pediatrics,
- Workplaces: University of California, Irvine School of Medicine, Harbor–UCLA Medical Center, UCLA School of Public Health

Kamyar Kalantar-Zadeh (born October 1963) is a US American physician doing research in nephrology, kidney dialysis, nutrition, and epidemiology. He is best known as a specialist in kidney disease nutrition and chronic kidney disease and for his hypothesis about the longevity of individuals with chronic disease states, also known as reverse epidemiology including obesity paradox. According to this hypothesis, obesity or hypercholesterolemia may counterintuitively be protective and associated with greater survival in certain groups of people, such as elderly individuals, dialysis patients, or those with chronic disease states and wasting syndrome (cachexia), whereas normal to low body mass index or normal values of serum cholesterol may be detrimental and associated with worse mortality. Kalantar-Zadeh is also known for his expertise in kidney dialysis therapy, including incremental dialysis, as well as renal nutrition. He is the brother of Kourosh Kalantar-zadeh, who is an Australian scientist involved in research in the fields of materials sciences, nanotechnology, and transducers.

== Education ==
Kalantar-Zadeh received his education in medicine from the University of Bochum and University of Bonn (Germany) and his M.D. degree from the University of Erlangen-Nuremberg (Germany). In addition, he obtained a master's degree in public health (Master of Public Health, MPH) and a PhD in epidemiology from the University of California, Berkeley. He is a practicing triple board certified physician specialist in internal medicine, pediatrics, and nephrology. Kalantar-Zadeh completed his residency at the State University of New York and his nephrology fellowship at the University of California, San Francisco.

== Career ==
Kalantar-Zadeh is a professor of medicine at the David Geffen School of Medicine at UCLA and based at the Lundquist Institute for Biomedical Innovation at Harbor–UCLA Medical Center (2000-2012, and since 2023), where he worked with his former mentor Joel D. Kopple and served as the founding director of the Harold Simmons Center for Chronic Disease Research and Epidemiology. During 2012-2022 Kalantar-Zadeh was in the University of California, Irvine School of Medicine as a tenured professor of medicine, pediatrics, public health, and Nursing Sciences, and chief of Nephrology, and the UC Irvine Medical Center. He also serves as a part-time staff physician at Tibor-Rubin VA Medical center in Long Beach, California, under the Veterans Health Administration. Kalantar-Zadeh has remained a professor of epidemiology at Fielding UCLA School of Public Health.

Kalantar-Zadeh has authored or coauthored over 1,100 research articles and reviews, which have been cited nearly 100,000 times, giving him an h-index of >150. In addition, Kalantar-Zadeh was editor-in-chief of the Journal of Renal Nutrition, and is an associate editor of the Journal of Cachexia, Sarcopenia and Muscle, Clinical Journal of the American Society of Nephrology., and Clinical Nutrition, and a member of the editorial boards of the Nephrology Dialysis Transplantation, Kidney International, American Journal of Kidney Diseases, Nutrients, and several other peer-reviewed journals in nephrology and nutrition. Kalantar-Zadeh is the past president of the International Society of Renal Nutrition and Metabolism and the past chair of the international steering committee of the World Kidney Day, and current president of the National Forum of the ESRD Networks, the coalition of the 18 congressionally mandated End Stage Renal Disease Program network organizations since 1978.

Kalantar-Zadeh first proposed reverse epidemiology in articles in the journal Kidney International in 2003 and in the Journal of the American College of Cardiology in 2004. It is a contradiction to prevailing concepts of prevention of atherosclerosis and cardiovascular disease. In an interview with Nature Magazine in 2016, Kalantar-Zadeh stated that obesity is like “that guy who led you to prison, [but] becomes your friend in prison."

Kalantar-Zadeh has also contributed extensively to the fields of dialysis and kidney disease nutrition including an invited review paper in The New England Journal of Medicine in 2017 on nutritional management of chronic kidney disease, in that he recommends low protein diet for conservative management of chronic kidney disease to delay dialysis initiation but high protein diet for dialysis patients without residual kidney function. Kalantar-Zadeh has published extensively on chronic kidney disease and end-stage renal disease including kidney dialysis with focus on incremental transition to dialysis therapy with initially less frequent hemodialysis treatment. Kalantar-Zadeh has first-authored three review and perspective articles in The New England Journal of Medicine including a 2013 case records paper on metabolic acidosis due to metformin toxicity, a 2017 renal nutrition review paper., and a 2020 perspective article on ensuring choice for people with kidney failure. as well as a 2021 review paper in The Lancet on kidney preserving therapy in persons with chronic kidney disease.
