= Peter Stenvinkel =

Swedish nephrologist and academic (born 1957)

- Born: 5 November 1957 (age 69); Strängnäs, Sweden
- Occupations: Nephrologist and academic

Academic background
- Education: M.D. Medicine; Ph.D. Nephrology
- Alma mater: Karolinska Institutet

Academic work
- Institutions: Karolinska University Hospital; Karolinska Institutet

Peter Stenvinkel (born 5 November 1957) is a Swedish nephrologist and academic. He is a senior lecturer at Karolinska University Hospital and a professor of nephrology at Karolinska Institutet.

Stenvinkel has conducted translational research aimed at identifying risk factors for metabolic, cardiovascular, and nutritional complications in chronic kidney disease (CKD). His work has delved into various aspects of inflammation, wasting, and metabolism in CKD patients. For his contributions to the field of renal medicine, he has won the Karolina Price, Vizenca Price, Addis Gold Medal and the ERA-EDTA prize for outstanding educational activities.

Stenvinkel is an Honorary member of the Polish Society of Nephrology, as well as the Australian and New Zealand Society of Nephrology. He served as an Editor-in-chief for NDT-E and has served as Editor for the Journal of Internal Medicine since 2022.

== Education ==
Stenvinkel earned his Doctor of Medicine degree from Karolinska Institute in 1982. While working as a Specialist in Nephrology, he graduated with a doctoral degree in Renal Medicine in 1994.

== Career ==
Stenvinkel began his academic career as an associate professor at Karolinska Institutet in 1997. Since 2009, he has been serving as a professor of nephrology at Karolinska Institutet and Senior lecturer at Karolinska University Hospital and where he engages in clinical duties, research, and administration.

Stenvinkel was a member of the KDOQI working group on risk factors for CVD in CKD from 2001 to 2004 and also on multiple advisory boards, including the Gambro Advisory Board, the Scientific Advisory Board of ERA-EDTA, and the Baxter Medical Advisory Board until 2013.

== Research ==
Stenvinkel has conducted translational research, emphasizing risk factors for metabolic, cardiovascular, and nutritional complications in chronic kidney disease (CKD).

=== Nephrology and cardiovascular disease ===
Stenvinkel's research has focused on the need for effective interventions addressing cardiovascular and nutritional complications in chronic kidney disease (CKD). In one of his highly cited studies, he explored the correlation between malnutrition, inflammation, and atherosclerosis to delve into their collective impact on cardiovascular disease (CVD) development in CKD patients, suggesting a synergistic effect in promoting atherosclerosis. Discussing chronic inflammation in CKD patients, he proposed a classification system for two types of malnutrition in CKD, and expanded on the relationship between inflammation and malnutrition by presenting the hypothesis that increased oxidative stress significantly influences CVD development in uremic patients. He showed that inflammation acts as a catalyst and changes the risk factor profile and also contributed to a technical note emphasizing the complexity of uremic retention, highlighting the need for comprehensive analytical methods beyond traditional markers like urea and creatinine.

Among other highly cited works, Stenvinkel's collaborative research explored the role of oxidative stress in CKD, focusing on its impact on CVD morbidity and mechanisms leading to enhanced oxidative stress in CKD. Additionally, he investigated how dysregulated cytokine networks contributed to accelerated atherosclerosis, resulting in increased inflammation risk in CKD patients, as well as demonstrated a link between immune dysfunction, CVD, and infections, leading to mortality in ESRD patients. In 2002, he show that IL-6 is a predictor of mortality in CKD which was evidenced by his study on end-stage renal disease (ESRD) patients at the outset of dialysis treatment.

Stenvinkel was part of the consortium, which identified sixteen novel genetic loci associated with blood pressure regulation, offering insights and potential therapeutic pathways for cardiovascular disease prevention. He has examined the bidirectional association between CKD and CVD, emphasizing the challenges in identifying cardiovascular culprits due to paradoxical associations and suggesting the potential role of proteomics and epigenetics in understanding vascular risk factors. He also addressed the overlooked epidemic of CKD and its association with CVD to emphasize early diagnosis through proteinuria. In recent years his research highlighted the premature aging, and accelerated vascular aging in the toxic uremic milieu, as well as advocated for interdisciplinary collaboration for innovative CKD treatments using insights from diverse species. In related research, he advocated for the concept of "food as medicine" in metabolic diseases like CKD, emphasizing dietary interventions, as bioactive nutrients have shown promise in mitigating CKD-related features.

Stenvinkel was part of the group that standardized the terminology for muscle wasting, malnutrition, and inflammation in CKD and AKI, and introduced "protein-energy wasting (PEW)" to describe loss of body protein mass and fuel reserves. He researched PEW in CKD patients, outlining its multifactorial etiology, including insufficient food intake, uremia-induced alterations, inflammation, acidosis, comorbidities and addressed interventions for PEW underscoring the effectiveness of nutritional supplementation and emerging therapies like anabolic agents.

=== Planetary health ===
Stenvinkel's research in planetary health has examined how environmental and climate threats have triggered processes like inflammation, oxidative stress, and mitochondrial dysfunction, reshaping disease patterns and increasing the risk of chronic conditions such as dementia, obesity, and diabetes. His work has also endorsed more sustainable healthcare practices, including reconsidering food production and consumption, and has suggested the use of interdisciplinary collaboration, biomimetic organizational models, and nature-inspired solutions in mitigating climate change as strategies to address environmental degradation and biodiversity loss. In 2024, he published a Swedish science book on Nature´s Intelligence and has published science texts on the link between animal hibernation and aging.

== Awards and honors ==
- 2010 – Addis Gold Medal, International Society of Renal Nutrition and Metabolism
- 2012 – International Awardee, National Kidney Foundation
- 2017 – ERA-EDTA Award for Outstanding Educational Contributions to Nephrology, European Renal Association
- 2020 – 13th Most Influential Nephrologist, Stanford University

== Selected articles ==
- Stenvinkel, Peter; Heimbürger, Olof; Paultre, Furcy; Diczfalusy, Ulf; Wang, Tao; Berglund, Lars; Jogestrand, Tomas (May 1999). "Strong association between malnutrition, inflammation, and atherosclerosis in chronic renal failure". Kidney International. 55 (5): 1899–1911. doi:10.1046/j.1523-1755.1999.00422.x. PMID 10231453.
- Stenvinkel, Peter; Heimbürger, Olof; Lindholm, Bengt; Kaysen, George A.; Bergström, Jonas (July 2000). "Are there two types of malnutrition in chronic renal failure? Evidence for relationships between malnutrition, inflammation and atherosclerosis (MIA syndrome)". Nephrology Dialysis Transplantation. 15 (7): 953–960. doi:10.1093/ndt/15.7.953. PMID 10862630.
- Himmelfarb, Jonathan; Stenvinkel, Peter; Ikizler, T. Alp; Hakim, Raymond M. (November 2002). "The elephant in uremia: Oxidant stress as a unifying concept of cardiovascular disease in uremia". Kidney International. 62 (5): 1524–1538. doi:10.1046/j.1523-1755.2002.00600.x. PMID 12371953.
- Vanholder, Raymond; De Smet, Rita; Glorieux, Griet; Argilés, Angel; Baurmeister, Ulrich; Brunet, Philippe; Clark, William; Cohen, Gerald; De Deyn, Peter Paul; Deppisch, Reinhold; Descamps-Latscha, Beatrice; Henle, Thomas; Jörres, Achim; Lemke, Horst Dieter; Massy, Ziad A.; Passlick-Deetjen, Jutta; Rodriguez, Mariano; Stegmayr, Bernd; Stenvinkel, Peter; Tetta, Ciro; Wanner, Christoph; Zidek, Walter (May 2003). "Review on uremic toxins: Classification, concentration, and interindividual variability". Kidney International. 63 (5): 1934–1943. doi:10.1046/j.1523-1755.2003.00924.x. PMID 12675874.
- Stenvinkel, Peter; Ketteler, Markus; Johnson, Richard J.; Lindholm, Bengt; Pecoits-Filho, Roberto; Riella, Miguel; Heimbürger, Olof; Cederholm, Tommy; Girndt, Matthias (April 2005). "IL-10, IL-6, and TNF-α: Central factors in the altered cytokine network of uremia—The good, the bad, and the ugly". Kidney International. 67 (4): 1216–1233. doi:10.1111/j.1523-1755.2005.00200.x. PMID 15780075.
- Fouque, D.; Kalantar-Zadeh, K.; Kopple, J.; Cano, N.; Chauveau, P.; Cuppari, L.; Franch, H.; Guarnieri, G.; Ikizler, T.A.; Kaysen, G.; Lindholm, B.; Massy, Z.; Mitch, W.; Pineda, E.; Stenvinkel, P.; Trevinho-Becerra, A.; Wanner, C. (February 2008). "A proposed nomenclature and diagnostic criteria for protein–energy wasting in acute and chronic kidney disease". Kidney International. 73 (4): 391–398. doi:10.1038/sj.ki.5002585. PMID 18094682.
- Stenvinkel, P. (November 2010). "Chronic kidney disease: a public health priority and harbinger of premature cardiovascular disease". Journal of Internal Medicine. 268 (5): 456–467. doi:10.1111/j.1365-2796.2010.02269.x. PMID 20809922.
- International Consortium for Blood Pressure Genome-Wide Association Studies; et al. (October 2011). "Genetic variants in novel pathways influence blood pressure and cardiovascular disease risk". Nature. 478 (7367): 103–109. Bibcode:2011Natur.478..103T. doi:10.1038/nature10405. PMC 3340926. PMID 21909115.
- Hobson, S.; Arefin, S.; Witasp, A.; Hernandez, L.; Kublickiene, K.; Shiels, P.G.; Stenvinkel, P. (14 April 2023). "Accelerated Vascular Aging in Chronic Kidney Disease: The Potential for Novel Therapies" (PDF). Circulation Research. 132 (8): 950–969. doi:10.1161/CIRCRESAHA.122.321751. PMID 37053277. S2CID 258052784.
