= Nathan W. Levin =

American physician

Nathan W. Levin is an American physician and founder of the Renal Research Institute, LLC., a research institute dedicated to improving the outcomes of patients with kidney disease, particularly those requiring dialysis. Levin is one of the most prominent and renowned figures in clinical nephrology as well as nephrology research. He has authored multiple book chapters and over 350 peer-reviewed publications, including articles in leading journals such as Nature, the New England Journal of Medicine, and The Lancet.

== Education and career ==
Levin received his medical degree from the University of the Witwatersrand in Johannesburg, South Africa. After his graduation he was a post-doctoral fellow at the College of Physicians of South Africa and later became a diplomate of the American Board of Internal Medicine and a fellow of the American College of Physicians. In 1974, upon training at the General Hospital in Johannesburg and the Presbyterian St. Luke's Hospital in Chicago, Illinois, he received his subspecialty diploma from the Board of Nephrology. During his medical career he held professorial appointments at the Northwestern University Medical School in Chicago, the University of Michigan in Ann Arbor, the Mount Sinai School of Medicine in New York City, and the Albert Einstein College of Medicine in New York City.

In 2005, Levin was appointed medical director of the Survey & Certification Group for the Centers for Medicare and Medicaid Services (CMS). His hospital appointments include Chief of the Renal Section at the V.A. Hospital in Chicago, Head of the Division of Nephrology and Hypertension at Henry Ford Hospital in Detroit, and Chief of the Division of Nephrology and Hypertension at Beth Israel Medical Center in New York City. He has held prominent positions in many professional societies, including President of the Michigan End-Stage Renal Disease (ESRD) Network, President of the Renal Physicians Association (RPA), and President of the RPA Research and Education Foundation. He was co-chairman of the AAMI Hemodialysis Reuse Committee and the National Kidney Foundation–Kidney Disease Outcomes Quality Initiative (NKF–KDOQI), member of the Clinical Practice Committee of the American Society of Nephrology, member of the International Society of Nephrology’s Membership Committee, member of the Council for the International Society of Renal Nutrition and Metabolism (ISRNM), and member of the American Diabetes Association. Levin was recently awarded the Belding Scribner Trailblazer Award, the Distinguished Nephrology Service Award of the RPA, the AAKP Medal of Excellence, the Fresenius Lifetime Achievement Award, the AAMI Recognition Award, the Garabed Eknoyan Award of the National Kidney Foundation and the Recognition Award for his role as Co-Chairman of the DOQI Advisory Council.

Among Levin's most prominent scientific projects are his role as one of the principal investigators of the HEMO study and his role as investigator in the CHOICE Study. The HEMO study was a randomized, controlled, multicenter trial which studied the effects of the dose of dialysis and the level of flux of the dialyzer membrane on mortality and morbidity among 1846 patients undergoing maintenance hemodialysis. The CHOICE (Choices for Healthy Outcomes in Caring for ESRD) Study investigated the relationships between dialysis modality (peritoneal dialysis versus hemodialysis) and patient survival. Furthermore, Levin is one of the principal investigators of the Frequent Hemodialysis Network (FHN) Study which investigates the effects of daily (six-times weekly) in-center hemodialysis versus conventional three-times weekly hemodialysis with respect to morbidity, mortality and quality of life.

In 1997 Levin co-founded with Linda L. Donald the Renal Research Institute in New York City, NY, US. This institute is a joint venture between Fresenius Medical Care North America and Beth Israel Medical Center. It is an administratively distinct institution and a collaborative effort among a selected group of dialysis facilities with strong ties to academic research institutions. Renal Research Institute trains Research Fellows from countries all around the world in kidney disease-related clinical research.

In 2015, Levin, together with Linda L. Donald, founded Easy Water for Everyone a USA NGO which utilizes a unique device, based on repurposed hemodialyzers, to remove pathogens of all types, including small viruses from fecally polluted water in Ghana, Uganda and Senegal. Over several years, this effort has progressed to the installation of 35 sites. The technology utilizes polysulfone hemodialyzers with a pore size excluding all pathogens. The prime result of the project has been a very large reduction in the incidence of diarrhea (approximately 70%) in children from weaning to the age of 5. Over 20,000 people now have access of pure water for drinking and for hand washing.

In 2015 Levin began to work as a consultant with responsibility for quality and research in a new organization called Dialyze Direct which has as its purpose the provision of dialysis in nursing homes throughout the United States.

== Honors and awards ==
- 2013 Honorary Professor, Zhenghou University, Henan Province, China
- 2013 Lifetime Achievement Award in Hemodialysis Annual Dialysis Conference
- 2012 Belding H. Scribner Award
- 2012 Joel D. Kopple Award
- 2011 Fulbright Senior Specialist, The Council for International Exchange of Scholars (CIES)
- 2010 Honorary Chair
- 2009 Belding Scribner Trailblazer Award
- 2009 Renal Physicians Associates Distinguished Nephrology Service Award
- 2008 AAKP Medal of Excellence
- 2007 Fresenius Lifetime Achievement Award
- 2007 AAMI Recognition Award
- 2005 NKF Garabed Eknoyan Award
- 2003 Doctor honoris causa, Poland
- 1997 Recognition Award, Co-Chairman, DOQI Advisory Council AMGEN salutes the invaluable contribution and leadership towards the Development of the NKF-DOQI Clinical Practice Guidelines
- 1992 NIH Award for HEMO and CHOICE studies
- 1980 American of Physicians Fellowship

== Recent publications ==
1. Sengstock D, Sands RL, Gillespie BW, Zhang X, Kiser M, Eisele G, Vaitkevicius P, Kuhlmann M, Levin NW, Hinderliter A, Rajagopalan S, Saran R: Dominance of traditional cardiovascular risk factors over renal function in predicting arterial stiffness in subjects with chronic kidney disease. Nephrol Dial Transplant. 2010 Mar;25(3):853-61
2. Kaysen GA, Kotanko P, Zhu F, Sarkar SR, Heymsfield SB, Kuhlmann MK, Dwyer T, Usvyat L, Havel P, Levin NW: Relationship between adiposity and cardiovascular risk factors in prevalent hemodialysis patients. J Ren Nutr. 2009 Sep;19(5):357-64.
3. Derose SF, Rutkowski MP, Levin NW, Liu IL, Shi JM, Jacobsen SJ, Crooks PW: Incidence of end-stage renal disease and death among insured African Americans with chronic kidney disease. Kidney Int. 2009 Sep;76(6):629-37
4. Thijssen S1, Zhu F, Kotanko P, Levin NW: Comment on "higher serum creatinine concentrations in black patients with chronic kidney disease: beyond nutritional status and body composition". Clin J Am Soc Nephrol. 2009 May;4(5):1011-3.
5. Carter M1, Zhu F, Kotanko P, Kuhlmann M, Ramirez L, Heymsfield SB, Handelman G, Levin NW: Assessment of body composition in dialysis patients by arm bioimpedance compared to MRI and 40K measurements. Blood Purif. 2009;27(4):330-7.
6. Wystrychowski G, Kitzler TM, Thijssen S, Usvyat L, Kotanko P, Levin NW: Impact of switch of vascular access type on key clinical and laboratory parameters in chronic haemodialysis patients. Nephrol Dial Transplant 2009;24:2194-2200.
7. van der Sande FM, Wystrychowski G, Kooman JP, Rosales L, Raimann J, Kotanko P, Carter M, Chan CT, Leunissen KM, Levin NW: Control of core temperature and blood pressure stability during hemodialysis. Clin J Am Soc Nephrol 2009;4:93-98.
8. Thijssen S, Zhu F, Kotanko P, Levin NW: Comment on "higher serum creatinine concentrations in black patients with chronic kidney disease: beyond nutritional status and body composition". Clin J Am Soc Nephrol 2009;4:1011-1013.
9. Tentori F, Albert JM, Young EW, Blayney MJ, Robinson BM, Pisoni RL, Akiba T, Greenwood RN, Kimata N, Levin NW, Piera LM, Saran R, Wolfe RA, Port FK: The survival advantage for haemodialysis patients taking vitamin D is questioned: findings from the Dialysis Outcomes and Practice Patterns Study. Nephrol Dial Transplant 2009;24:963-972.
10. Sengstock D, Sands RL, Gillespie BW, Zhang X, Kiser M, Eisele G, Vaitkevicius P, Kuhlmann M, Levin NW, Hinderliter A, Rajagopalan S, Saran R: Dominance of traditional cardiovascular risk factors over renal function in predicting arterial stiffness in subjects with chronic kidney disease. Nephrol Dial Transplant 2009.
11. Levin NW, Kotanko P, Ronco C: RRI's 11th International Conference on Dialysis, Advances in CKD 2009, emphasizes new developments in both technology and process. Blood Purif 2009;27:5.
12. Kshirsagar AV, Craig RG, Moss KL, Beck JD, Offenbacher S, Kotanko P, Klemmer PJ, Yoshino M, Levin NW, Yip JK, Almas K, Lupovici EM, Usvyat LA, Falk RJ: Periodontal disease adversely affects the survival of patients with end-stage renal disease. Kidney Int 2009;75:746-751.
13. Kotanko P, Thijssen S, Usvyat L, Tashman A, Kruse A, Huber C, Levin NW: Temporal evolution of clinical parameters before death in dialysis patients: a new concept. Blood Purif 2009;27:38-47.
14. Kaysen GA, Kotanko P, Zhu F, Sarkar SR, Heymsfield SB, Kuhlmann MK, Dwyer T, Usvyat L, Havel P, Levin NW: Relationship between adiposity and cardiovascular risk factors in prevalent hemodialysis patients. J Ren Nutr 2009;19:357-364.
15. Derose SF, Rutkowski MP, Levin NW, Liu IL, Shi JM, Jacobsen SJ, Crooks PW: Incidence of end-stage renal disease and death among insured African Americans with chronic kidney disease. Kidney Int 2009;76:629-637.
16. Carter M, Zhu F, Kotanko P, Kuhlmann M, Ramirez L, Heymsfield SB, Handelman G, Levin NW: Assessment of body composition in dialysis patients by arm bioimpedance compared to MRI and 40K measurements. Blood Purif 2009;27:330-337.
17. Zhu F, Leonard EF, Levin NW: Extracellular fluid redistribution during hemodialysis: bioimpedance measurement and model. Physiol Meas 2008;29:S491-501.
18. Zhu F, Kuhlmann MK, Kotanko P, Seibert E, Leonard EF, Levin NW: A method for the estimation of hydration state during hemodialysis using a calf bioimpedance technique. Physiol Meas 2008;29:S503-516.
19. Thijssen S, Kotanko P, Levin NW: What are the potential solutions for the problems with current methods for quantifying hemodialysis?: volume and large/protein-bound toxins. Semin Dial 2008;21:409-411.
20. Thijssen S, Kitzler TM, Levin NW: Salt: its role in chronic kidney disease. J Ren Nutr 2008;18:18-26.
21. Ronco C, Levin NW: Dialysis: Advances in Chronic Kidney Disease. Preface. Blood Purif 2008;26:5.
22. Richter A, Kuhlmann MK, Seibert E, Kotanko P, Levin NW, Handelman GJ: Vitamin C deficiency and secondary hyperparathyroidism in chronic haemodialysis patients. Nephrol Dial Transplant 2008;23:2058-2063.
23. Raimann J, Liu L, Ulloa D, Kotanko P, Levin NW: Consequences of overhydration and the need for dry weight assessment. Contrib Nephrol 2008;161:99-107.
24. Raimann J, Liu L, Tyagi S, Levin NW, Kotanko P: A fresh look at dry weight. Hemodial Int 2008;12:395-405.
25. Kuhlmann MK, Levin NW: How common is malnutrition in ESRD? New approaches to diagnosis of malnutrition. Blood Purif 2008;26:49-53.
26. Kuhlmann MK, Levin NW: Potential interplay between nutrition and inflammation in dialysis patients. Contrib Nephrol 2008;161:76-82.
27. Kruse A, Uehlinger DE, Gotch F, Kotanko P, Levin NW: Red blood cell lifespan, erythropoiesis and hemoglobin control. Contrib Nephrol 2008;161:247-254.
28. Kotanko P, Thijssen S, Levin NW: Association between erythropoietin responsiveness and body composition in dialysis patients. Blood Purif 2008;26:82-89.
29. Kotanko P, Levin NW, Zhu F: Current state of bioimpedance technologies in dialysis. Nephrol Dial Transplant 2008;23:808-812.
30. Kaysen GA, Kotanko P, Zhu F, Sarkar SR, Heymsfield SB, Kuhlmann MK, Levin NW: Estimation of adipose pools in hemodialysis patients from anthropometric measures. J Ren Nutr 2008;18:473-478.
31. Hirachan P, Thijssen S, Levin NW, Kotanko P: Body composition and outcomes in chronic hemodialysis patients. Contrib Nephrol 2008;161:108-114.
32. Handelman GJ, Levin NW: Iron and anemia in human biology: a review of mechanisms. Heart Fail Rev 2008;13:393-404.
33. Daugirdas JT, Levin NW, Kotanko P, Depner TA, Kuhlmann MK, Chertow GM, Rocco MV: Comparison of proposed alternative methods for rescaling dialysis dose: resting energy expenditure, high metabolic rate organ mass, liver size, and body surface area. Semin Dial 2008;21:377-384.
34. Daugirdas JT, Depner TA, Greene T, Kuhlmann MK, Levin NW, Chertow GM, Rocco MV: Surface-area-normalized Kt/V: a method of rescaling dialysis dose to body surface area-implications for different-size patients by gender. Semin Dial 2008;21:415-421.
35. Jochen G. Raimann, Joseph Marfo Boaheng, Philipp Narh, Harrison Matti, Seth Johnson, Linda Donald, Hongbin Zhang, Friedrich Port, Nathan W. Levin: Public health benefits of water purification using recycled hemodialyzers in developing countries. Scientific Reports Nature Research (2020) 10:11101.
