= NKRF =

NKRF may refer to:

- NKRF (gene)
- National Kidney Research Fund, former name of Kidney Research UK
