= Anne Simmonds =

Chemist

- Born: 6 December 1927; Kohukohu
- Died: 2 April 2010

Academic background
- Education: The Correspondence School, Whangārei Girls' High School, University of Auckland, University of Otago, University of London
- Thesis: The separation and identification of purines, pyrimidines and pyrazolopyrimidines in patients with gout treated with 4- hydroxypyrazolo (3,4-d) pyrimidine (Allopurinol) (1971)

Academic work
- Institutions: Guy's Hospital Medical School, Auckland City Hospital
- Doctoral students: Dianne Webster

Hermione Anne Simmonds (6 December 1927 – 2 April 2010) was a New Zealand biochemist, who worked mostly in the United Kingdom. She was an expert in inborn errors of purine and pyrimidine metabolism, publishing more than 400 papers and book chapters. Simmonds was a co-founder of the Purine and Pyrimidine Society, the Purine Metabolic Patients' Association and the Association of Researchers in Medical Science.

== New Zealand ==
Simmonds was born on 6 December 1927 to Frederick Simmonds and Katherine Hermione Blundell, and was the middle of three sisters. She was raised on a farm in Kohukohu in New Zealand. The farm was remote and her primary education was by correspondence, before she attended Whangārei Girls’ High School. She studied organic chemistry, gaining a Bachelor of Science in 1948 and a Master of Science in 1949, both from the Auckland University College. Simmonds also studied at the University of Otago. Simmonds then worked in hospital laboratories in New Zealand and overseas. In the 1950s Simmonds travelled in Norway and North America with a friend, and then participated in an archaeological dig in Jordan in 1962, run by John Allegro, working on Dead Sea Scrolls. Simmonds was bitten by a camel and became seriously ill. She was rescued by a plane sent by King Hussain of Jordan, after a ham radio call for help, and spent a month in a hospital in Amman recovering. Simmonds returned to New Zealand, and worked in Auckland Hospital renal unit. In 1963 she was asked to assist in the identification of crystals in an anaemic infant's urine. Simmonds identified them as orotate crystals, and the child was found to have hereditary orotic aciduria, a disorder caused by a decreased ability to synthesize pyrimidines. This began Simmonds interest in pyrimidine metabolism, and she transferred to the biochemistry unit at Auckland Hospital, and began research to identify pyrimidines using anion exchange fractionation followed by thin layer chromatography.

== Career in England ==
In 1968 Simmonds joined the Wellcome Research Laboratories outside London. While at Wellcome Simmonds completed a PhD titled The separation and identification of purines, pyrimidines and pyrazolopyrimidines in patients with gout treated with 4- hydroxypyrazolo (3,4-d) pyrimidine (Allopurinol) at the University of London. In 1971 Simmonds was invited by Stewart Cameron and Rodney Graham to set up the Purine Research Laboratory at Guys Hospital Medical School. Simmonds went on to publish more than 400 peer-reviewed articles and book chapters on purine and pyrimidine metabolism and their metabolism in humans. Simmonds collaborated with Francoise Roch-Ramel, and was friends with Gertrude Elion and George Hitchings through the Wellcome laboratory.

Simmonds was a founding member of the Purine and Pyrimidine Society, and helped found the Purine Metabolic Patients' Association (PUMPA) in 1983. She also advocated for better work conditions for medical researchers. She wrote to The Lancet and The Times about career prospects for young researchers, and went on to help found the Association of Researchers in Medical Science.

Simmonds officially retired in May 2008, although she kept working. She died on 2 April 2010.

== Legacy ==
The international symposium held at Indiana University, Bloomington, in May 1994 was dedicated in Simmonds' honour. The 2019 International Symposium on Purine and Pyrimidine Metabolism in Man, held in Lyon, included an Anne Simmonds Memorial Lecture, which was given by Monika Löffler. The dedication noted her "outstanding contributions to the identification and study of inborn errors of purine and pyrimidine metabolism".

== Selected works ==
Books

- Stone, T. W.; Simmonds, H. A. (31 March 1991). Purines: Basic and Clinical Aspects. Springer Dordrecht. p. 257. doi:10.1007/978-94-011-3911-3. ISBN 978-0-7923-8925-5.
- Grahame, R.; Simmmonds, H. A.; Carrey, E., eds. (2003). Gout—The "At Your Finger Tips" Guide. London: Class Publishers.

Journal articles

- Satoshi Sumi; Marinaki, Anthony M.; Arenas, Monica; Fairbanks, Lynette D.; Monsor Shobowale-Bakre; Rees, David C.; Swee Lay Thein; Ansari, Azhar; Sanderson, Jeremy D.; Ronney A De Abreu; H Anne Simmonds; John A Duley (2002). "Genetic basis of inosine triphosphate pyrophosphohydrolase deficiency". Human Genetics. 111 (4–5): 360–367. doi:10.1007/s00439-002-0798-z. PMID 12384777. Wikidata Q34154888.
- Rückemann K; Fairbanks, Lynette D.; Carrey, Elizabeth A.; Catherine M. Hawrylowicz; Richards DF; Kirschbaum B; Simmonds, Hermione Anne (1998). "Leflunomide inhibits pyrimidine de novo synthesis in mitogen-stimulated T-lymphocytes from healthy humans". Journal of Biological Chemistry. 273 (34): 21682–21691. doi:10.1074/jbc.273.34.21682. PMID 9705303. Wikidata Q47682285.
- Fairbanks, Lynette D.; Bofill M; Ruckemann K; Simmonds, Hermione Anne (1995). "Importance of ribonucleotide availability to proliferating T-lymphocytes from healthy humans. Disproportionate expansion of pyrimidine pools and contrasting effects of de novo synthesis inhibitors". Journal of Biological Chemistry. 270 (50): 29682–29689. doi:10.1074/jbc.270.50.29690. PMID 8530356. Wikidata Q50588989.
- Coralie Bingham; Sian Ellard; William G van't Hoff; et al. (2003). "Atypical familial juvenile hyperuricemic nephropathy associated with a hepatocyte nuclear factor-1beta gene mutation". Kidney International. 63 (5): 1645–1651. doi:10.1046/j.1523-1755.2003.00903.x. PMID 12675839. Wikidata Q34188317.
- Monika Löffler; Fairbanks, Lynette D.; Elke Zameitat; Marinaki, Anthony M.; Simmonds, Hermione Anne (2005). "Pyrimidine pathways in health and disease". Trends in Molecular Medicine. 11 (9): 430–437. doi:10.1016/j.molmed.2005.07.003. PMID 16098809. Wikidata Q36228595.
- Cameron, Stewart; Moro F; Simmonds, Hermione Anne (1993). "Gout, uric acid and purine metabolism in paediatric nephrology". Pediatric Nephrology. 7 (1): 105–118. doi:10.1007/bf00861588. PMID 8439471. Wikidata Q34360840.
- H. A. Simmonds; G. S. Panayi; V. Corrigall (1978). "A role for purine metabolism in the immune response: Adenosine-deaminase activity and deoxyadenosine catabolism". The Lancet. 1 (8055): 60–63. doi:10.1016/s0140-6736(78)90002-8. PMID 74565. Wikidata Q39471848.
