= American Journal of Kidney Diseases =

- Discipline: Nephrology
- Language: English
- Edited by: Harold I. Feldman

Publication details
- History: 1981–present
- Publisher: Elsevier on behalf of the National Kidney Foundation (United States)
- Frequency: Monthly
- Open access: Hybrid
- Impact factor: 13.2 (2022)

Standard abbreviations
- ISO 4: Am. J. Kidney Dis.

Indexing
- CODEN: AJKDD
- ISSN: 0272-6386 (print); 1523-6838 (web)
- OCLC no.: 06887399

Links
- Journal homepage; Online access; Online archive; Journal description on Elsevier website

The American Journal of Kidney Diseases (AJKD) is a monthly peer-reviewed medical journal covering all aspects of nephrology. It is the official journal of the National Kidney Foundation and is published by Elsevier.

== Overview ==
The journal publishes original research, case reports, and educational articles such as narrative reviews and teaching cases. It is abstracted and indexed in PubMed/MEDLINE/Index Medicus.

== AJKD Blog ==
Since November 2011, the journal publishes a blog, AJKD Blog, which posts interviews with authors, commentaries, and educational material approximately twice per week.

== Impact Factor ==
According to the Journal Citation Reports, the journal has a 2022 impact factor of 13.2. The journal's current editor-in-chief is Harold I. Feldman (University of Pennsylvania).

== See also ==
- Clinical Radiology
