= Dianne Webster =

New Zealand neonatal paediatrician

Dianne Webster CNZM QSO
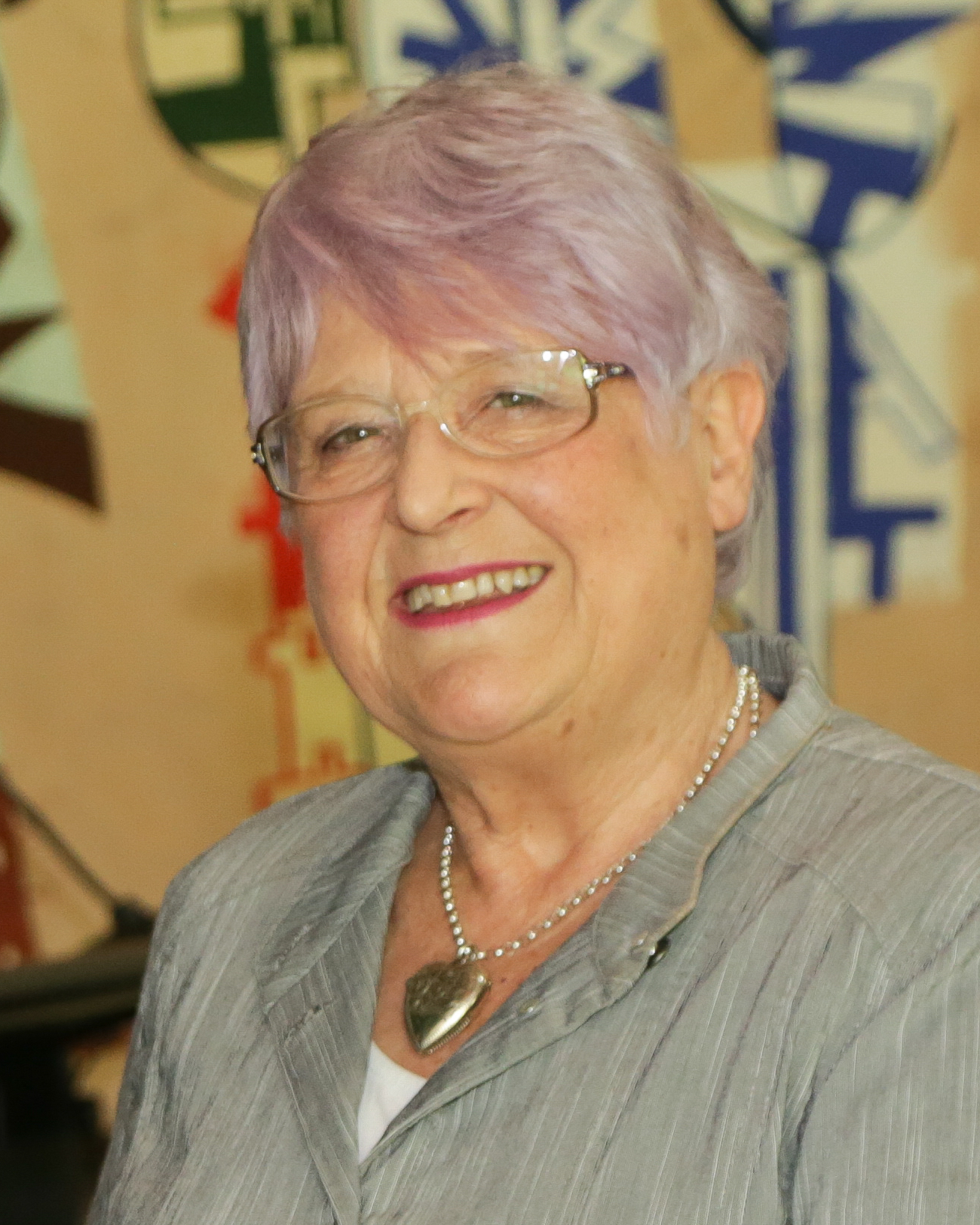
- Awards: Companion of the Queen's Service Order, Companion of the New Zealand Order of Merit

Academic background
- Education: University of Auckland, University of London
- Thesis: Interrelations between purine and pyrimidine metabolism in man (1981)
- Doctoral advisor: Anne Simmonds

Dianne Rosemary Webster CNZM QSO is a New Zealand consultant paediatrician. She directed the New Zealand national newborn metabolic screening programme for more than twenty-five years. In 2007, Webster was appointed a Companion of the Queen's Service Order for services to public health, in particular paediatrics. In 2020, she was appointed a Companion of the New Zealand Order of Merit for services to health, particularly paediatrics.

== Academic career ==
Webster graduated from the University of Auckland with a degree in chemistry in 1972, and then completed a PhD in biochemistry, titled Interrelations between purine and pyrimidine metabolism in man, at the Guys Hospital Medical School, King's College London in 1981. Webster continued her doctoral studies on the purine/pyrimidine metabolism and examined the enzyme deficiency disease orotic aciduria and as a research assistant and postdoctoral researcher.

In 1991 Webster became involved in the neonatal screening programme when she was appointed as director of the National Testing Centre at the Auckland District Health Board. She was director for more than twenty-five years. Webster also lectured in the University of Auckland School of Medicine. Webster oversaw the policy discussions and other changes required to add severe combined immune deficiency to the screening programme. Other changes during her leadership included the introduction of a text message alert system for midwives, and improvements to speed and equity of screening.

== Honours and awards ==
In the 2007 Queen's Birthday Honours Webster was appointed a Companion of the Queen's Service Order for services to public health, in particular paediatrics. In the 2020 New Year Honours, Webster was appointed a Companion of the New Zealand Order of Merit for services to health, particularly paediatrics.

In 2008 Webster was awarded the International Society for Neonatal Screening's Robert Guthrie Award.

She was elected an emeritus member of the Human Genetics Society of Australasia.

== Selected works ==
- David M S McHugh; Cynthia A Cameron; Jose E Abdenur; et al. (2011). "Clinical validation of cutoff target ranges in newborn screening of metabolic disorders by tandem mass spectrometry: a worldwide collaborative project". Genetics in Medicine. 13 (3): 230–254. doi:10.1097/gim.0b013e31820d5e67. PMID 21325949. Wikidata Q53438013.
- Marquardt, Gregg; Currier, Robert John; David M S McHugh; et al. (2012). "Enhanced interpretation of newborn screening results without analyte cutoff values". Genetics in Medicine. 14 (7): 648–655. doi:10.1038/gim.2012.2. PMID 22766634. Wikidata Q45109758.
- Songya Pang; Anastasia Clark; Eurico Camargo Neto; et al. (1993). "Congenital adrenal hyperplasia due to 21-hydroxylase deficiency: Newborn screening and its relationship to the diagnosis and treatment of the disorder". Screening : journal of the International Society of Neonatal Screening. 2 (2–3): 105–139. doi:10.1016/0925-6164(93)90024-d. Wikidata Q57632303.
- Natasha L Heather; Sumudu N Seneviratne; Webster, Dianne Rosemary; Behrensdorf, José Guilherme; Jefferies, Craig; Joan Carll; Yannan Jiang; Cutfield, Wayne Stephen; Hofman, Paul Leslie (2014). "Newborn screening for congenital adrenal hyperplasia in New Zealand, 1994-2013". The Journal of Clinical Endocrinology and Metabolism. 100 (3): 1002–1008. doi:10.1210/jc.2014-3168. PMID 25494862. Wikidata Q51069880.
- Benjamin B Albert; Cutfield, Wayne Stephen; Webster, Dianne Rosemary; Joan Carll; Behrensdorf, José Guilherme; Jefferies, Craig; Gunn, Alistair Jan; Hofman, Paul Leslie (2012). "Etiology of increasing incidence of congenital hypothyroidism in New Zealand from 1993-2010". The Journal of Clinical Endocrinology and Metabolism. 97 (9): 3155–3160. doi:10.1210/jc.2012-1562. PMID 22723332. Wikidata Q51330337.
