= WKD =

WKD may refer to:

- Warsaw Commuter Railway, a light railway in Warsaw, Poland
- WKD Original Vodka, an alcopop
- World Kidney Day
- World Kindness Day, an international observance held on 13 November each year
