= Journal of Renal Nutrition =

- Discipline: Nephrology, nutrition, metabolism
- Language: English
- Edited by: Linda Moore, Kamyar Kalantar-Zadeh

Publication details
- History: 1991–present
- Publisher: Elsevier on behalf of the Council on Renal Nutrition of the National Kidney Foundation, International Society of Renal Nutrition and Metabolism
- Frequency: Bimonthly
- Impact factor: 4.354 (2021)

Standard abbreviations
- ISO 4: J. Ren. Nutr.

Indexing
- ISSN: 1051-2276 (print); 1532-8503 (web)

Links
- Journal homepage; Online access; Online archive; Journal page at publisher's website

The Journal of Renal Nutrition is a bimonthly peer-reviewed medical journal. It is published by Elsevier on behalf of the International Society of Renal Nutrition and Metabolism and the Council on Renal Nutrition of the National Kidney Foundation. It is abstracted and indexed in MEDLINE/PubMed. According to the Journal Citation Reports, the journal has a 2021 impact factor of 4.354.

According to the journal's official homepage: "The Journal of Renal Nutrition is devoted exclusively to renal nutrition science and renal dietetics. Its content is appropriate for nutritionists, physicians and researchers working in nephrology. Each issue contains a state-of-the-art review, original research, articles on the clinical management and education of patients, a current literature review, and nutritional analysis of food products that have clinical relevance."
