= Polish Society of Nephrology =

Polish non-profit medical association

The Polish Society of Nephrology (PSN; Polish: Polskie Towarzystwo Nefrologiczne) is a non-profit medical-scientific association, established in 1983, with a current headquarters in Warsaw that unites nephrologists, physicians and other scholars, experts and professionals in the fields of kidney diseases, dialysis therapy and renal transplantation.

== History ==
The Polish Society of Nephrology was established during the First Funding Congress, which was held in September 1983 in Bydgoszcz and registered in the District Court in Łódź. At that time there were two separate societies gathering doctors and other health care professionals specialized in kidney diseases - Nephrology Committee of the Polish Academy of Science chaired by Professor Tadeusz Orłowski and Nephrology Section of the Polish Society of Internal Medicine chaired by Professor Kazimierz Trznadel.

The main initiator of establishment of PSN was Professor Franciszek Kokot, who was then an active member of international nephrology societies i.e. European Dialysis and Transplantation Association. The last conference of the Nephrology Section of the Polish Society of Internal Medicine was thereby the First Funding Congress of PSN. During the Congress Society's Statute was established and the first Board was elected. The first President of PSN was Professor Tadeusz Orłowski.

== Aims of the society ==
The main aim of the Society is to represent nephrologists' community i.e. to develop and promote up-to-date clinical practice in the fields of nephrology, dialysis therapy and kidney transplantation as well as to take part in health care organization in the area of Society's competence. PSN promotes kidney health by organizing educational meetings and cooperating with patient organizations. The aim of PSN is also to promote continuous professional development, research activities and international cooperation among its members.

== Young Nephrologists' Club ==
Young Nephrologists' Club (YNC) of the PSN was established in 2014. The aim of the YNC is to cooperate with the Young Nephrologists' Platform of the ERA-EDTA and to promote improvements in continuous professional development as well as research activities among young doctors and other professionals in the fields of nephrology, dialysis therapy and renal transplantation.

== Journals ==
- Polish Nephrology and Dialysis Therapy - established in 1997, edited by Przegląd Lekarski publisher, publishes original papers, reviews, statements and recommendations, letters to editor and case reports. The editor-in-chief is Professor Władysław Sułowicz.
- Nephrology Forum - issued since 2008, edited by Via Medica publisher, publishes mostly reviews, recommendations and guidelines. The editor-in-chief is Professor Bolesław Rutkowski.

== International cooperation ==
- International Society of Nephrology
- European Renal Association - European Dialysis and Transplanstation Association
