= Michael L. Nicholson =

English Transplant Surgeon

Michael L. Nicholson OBE, FRCS (born November 1959) is an English surgeon, who pioneered laparoscopic live-donor nephrectomy surgery, and developed and translated normothermic machine perfusion technologies for kidney transplantation.

== Early life and education ==
Michael Nicholson was born in Yorkshire in November 1959. He attended Nottingham Medical School, and subsequently trained in Oxford and Leicester.

== Career ==
Nicholson qualified as a medical doctor in 1982.

He is Professor of Transplantation Surgery at the University of Cambridge, and Professorial Fellow and Director of Studies at St Catherine's College, Cambridge. Nicholson is Director at the NIHR Blood and Transplant Research Unit in Organ Donation and Transplantation.

== Awards and honours ==
In 2025, Nicholson was recognised as an Officer of the Order of the British Empire (OBE), for his work in kidney transplantation. The Kidney Research UK charity offers the Professor Michael Nicholson Awards, in honour of Nicholson's dedication to developing new and innovative approaches to kidney transplantation.
