= Marcello Tonelli (nephrologist) =

Canadian nephrologist and professor at the University of Calgary

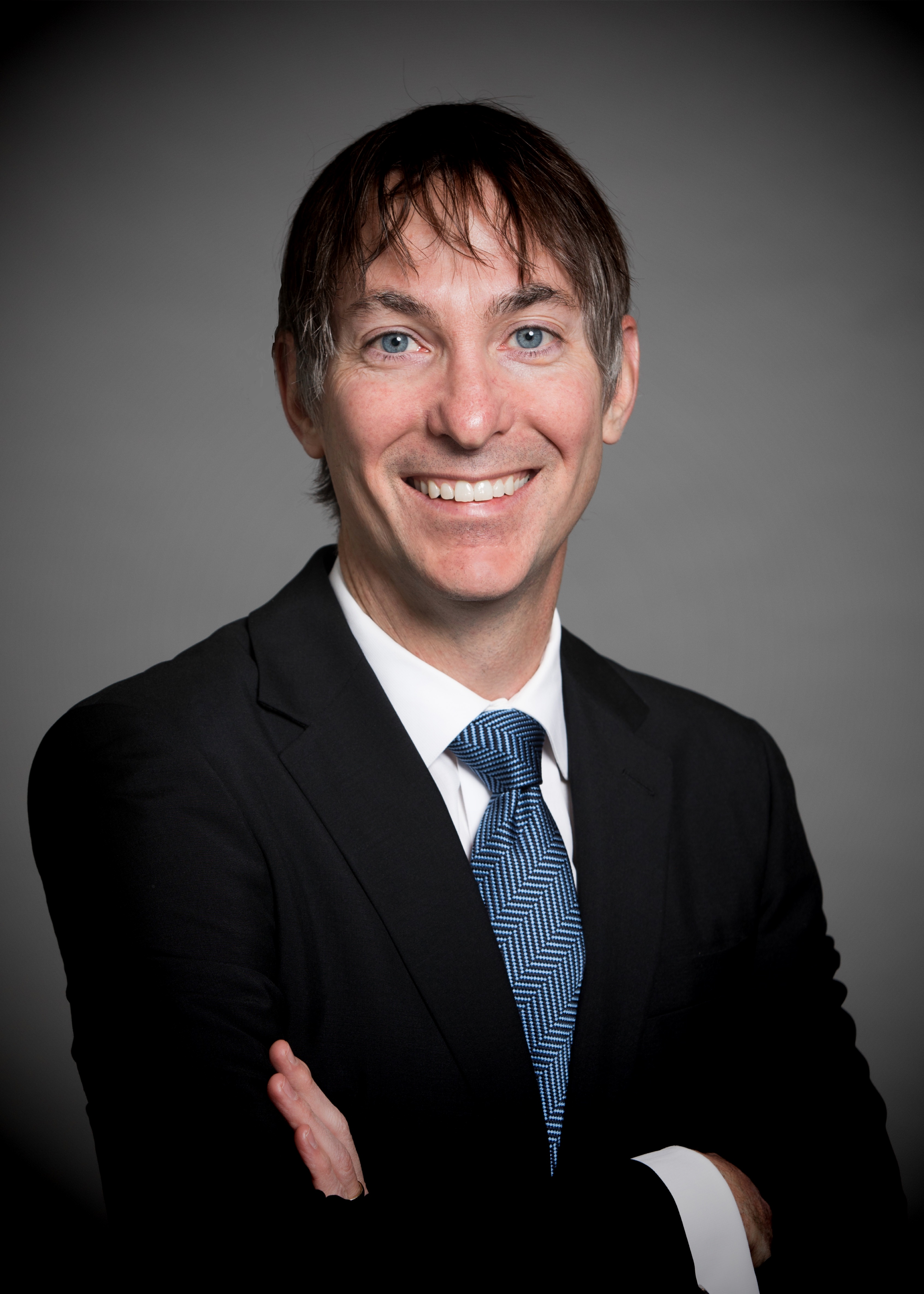
- Education: University of Western Ontario, Dalhousie University, Harvard School of Public Health, Imperial College London
- Known for: Chronic kidney disease research
- Scientific career
- Fields: Nephrology, public health
- Workplaces: University of Calgary

Marcello Tonelli is a Canadian nephrologist and professor at the University of Calgary. He is known for his research on chronic kidney disease (CKD) and the prevention and control of noncommunicable diseases.

== Early life and education ==
Tonelli obtained an MD from the University of Western Ontario in 1995. He completed a nephrology residency at Dalhousie University and postdoctoral training at the Harvard School of Public Health. In 2014, he earned a master's degree in health policy from Imperial College London.

== Career ==
Tonelli is a practicing nephrologist, a professor at the University of Calgary and the founding director of the World Health Organization (WHO) Collaborating Centre for Chronic Kidney Disease. He has served as President of the Canadian Society of Nephrology and is currently President of the International Society of Nephrology (ISN).

Tonelli served as a member of the Governing Council of the Canadian Institutes of Health Research (CIHR) from 2016 to 2023, serving on the Governing Council Executive Committee from 2019 to 2022. He also chaired the CIHR Standing Committee on Ethics from 2018 to 2022.

== Research and contributions ==
Tonelli has authored over 600 peer-reviewed papers, with an h-index of 135 and more than 130,000 citations, according to Web of Science. His research focuses on reducing the burden of chronic kidney disease, improving health services and health equity, and enhancing healthcare for people with disabilities, such as hearing loss.
