= Wellcome Research Laboratories =

English research institute

Coordinates: 51°23′39.51″N 0°1′17.13″W

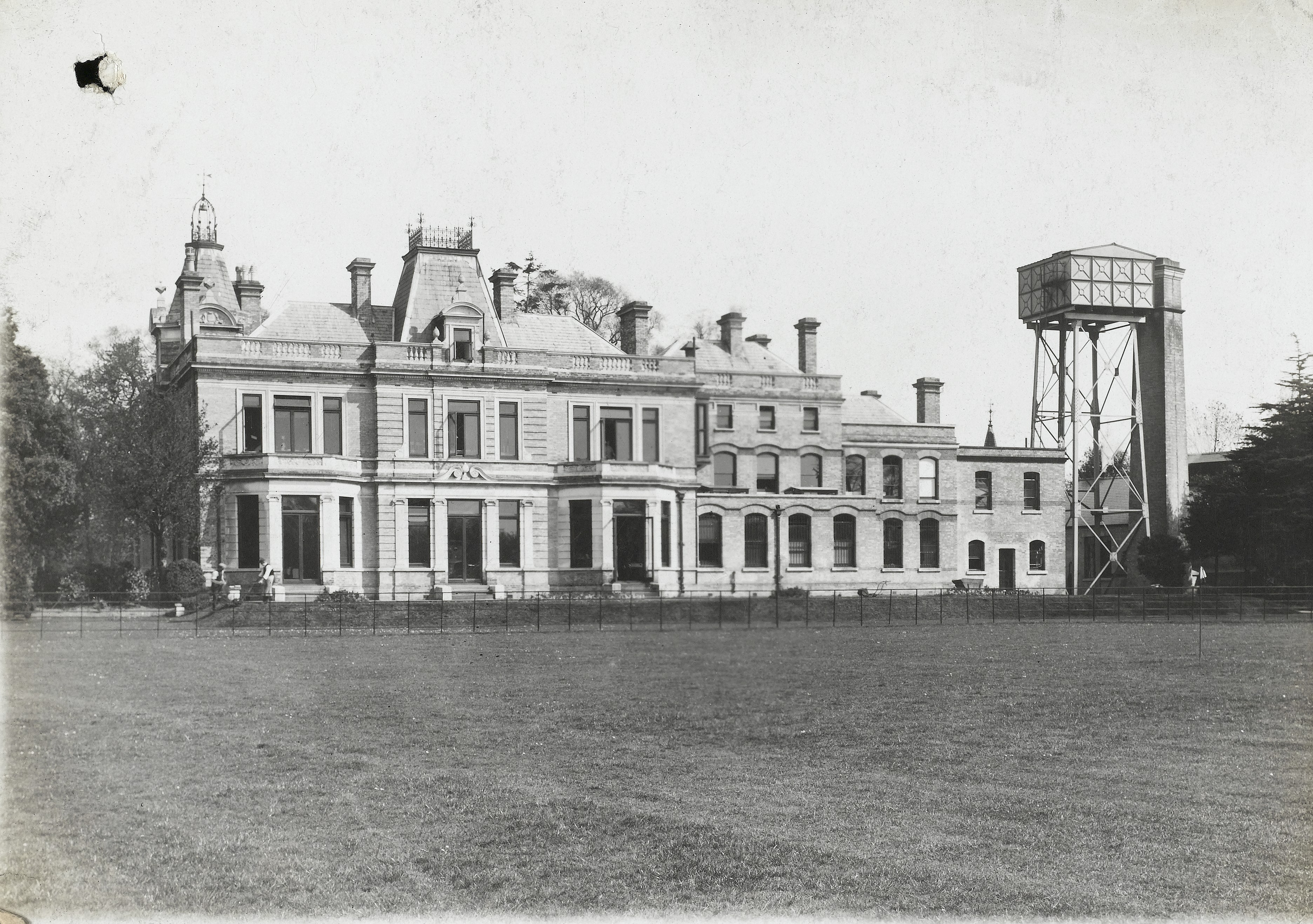
Photo of Langley Court. Site of the Wellcome Physiological Research Laboratories main building.

Wellcome Research Laboratories was a site in Beckenham, south-east London, that was a main research centre for pharmaceuticals. Until 1965, this laboratory site was situated in Kent.

== History ==
In 1894 Henry Wellcome set up a laboratory in central London to investigate a treatment for diphtheria. In 1898 it moved to Brockwell Hall in Herne Hill (now in Lambeth). In 1919 Henry Wellcome bought a 105-acre site in Beckenham, Kent, which cost £32,000. The site had belonged to the Langley family since 1350. Langley Court had been built in 1886 by James Bucknall, who lived in the house with his family until 1914.

It was named the Wellcome Research Laboratories in 1946 after the Wellcome Chemical Research Laboratories moved to the site. The Wellcome Trust had been set up in 1936, after the death in that year of Sir Henry Wellcome.

They have developed the antibiotic trimethoprim.

=== Awards ===
In April 1990, the site won the Queen's Award for Export and Technological Achievement for their Retrovir drug (Zidovudine), an antiretroviral medication; it had been launched in 1987 as AZT, and was the world's first antiretroviral medication. This medication caused the Wellcome share price to increase in 1989 by five times.

=== Closure ===
It closed in 1995 after Wellcome had been taken over by Glaxo in March 1995 to form Glaxo Wellcome. In December 2000, Glaxo Wellcome became GlaxoSmithKline, when it merged with SmithKline Beecham.

=== Directors ===
- Sir Salvador Moncada FRS 1986-95

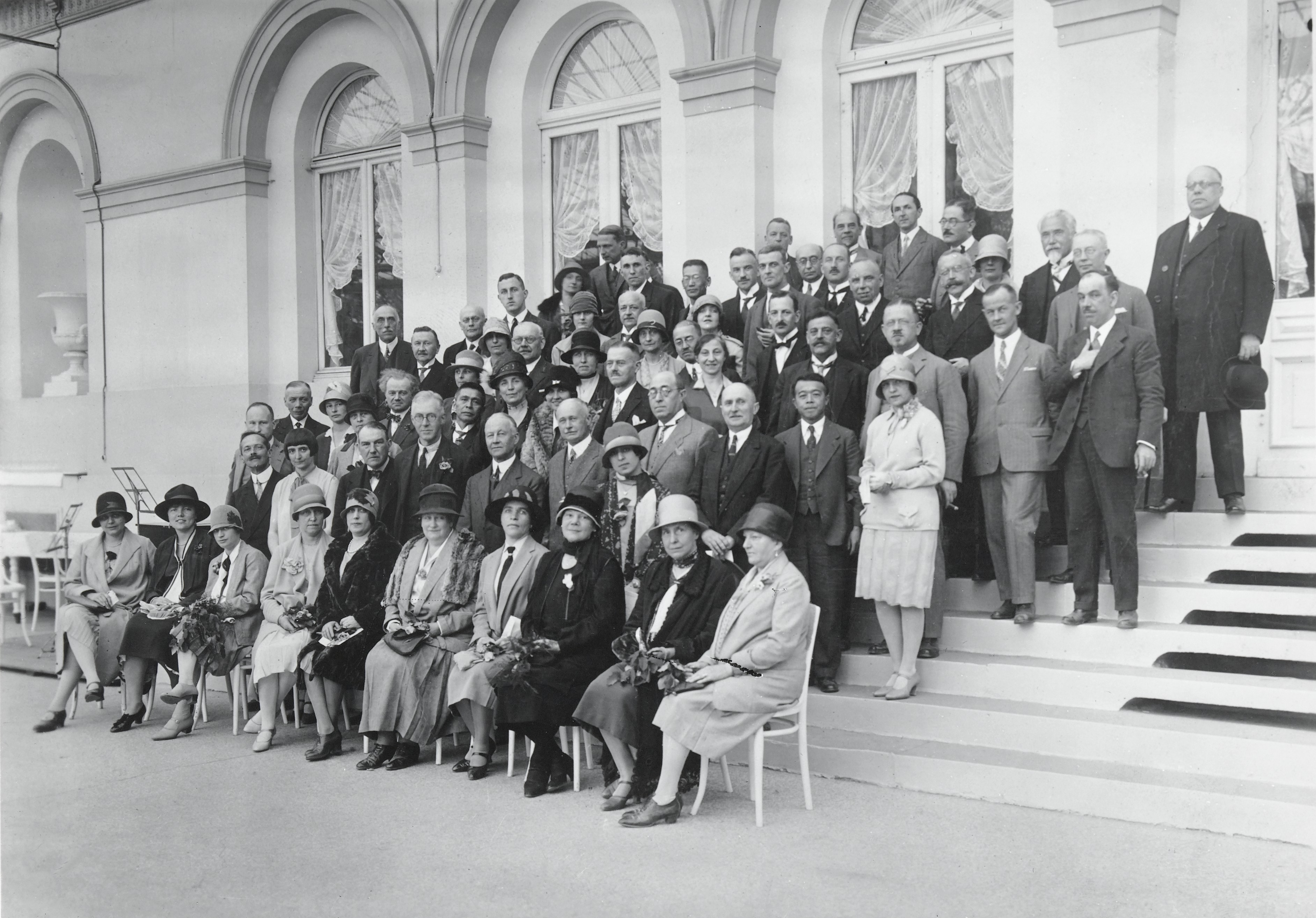
Staff at Langley Court in the 1930s

=== Alumni ===
- Adrien Albert
- June Almeida
- Sir James Black FRS, winner of the 1988 Nobel Prize for Medicine
- Gladwin Albert Hurst Buttle
- Victor Darley-Usmar
- Trevor M Jones
- Charles Kellaway FRS
- Gilberto de Nucci
- Alan R. Saltiel
- Anne Simmonds
- Sir Patrick Vallance FRS, Chief Scientific Adviser to UK Government since 2018
- Sir John Vane FRS, winner of the 1982 Nobel Prize for Medicine
- John L. Wallace

== See also ==
- Wellcome Research Institute, in central London
- Wellcome Trust Centre for Human Genetics, in Oxford
- Wellcome Trust Centre for Stem Cell Research, in Cambridge
- Wellcome Trust Sanger Institute, in Cambridgeshire
