= Science 37 =

American clinical research company

- Type: Private
- Traded as: Nasdaq: SNCE
- Industry: Clinical research
- Founded: 2014; 12 years ago
- Founders: Noah Craft; Belinda Tan
- Owner: Independent (2014-24); eMed, LLC (2024–present)
- Website: www.science37.com

Science 37 is an American clinical research company that specializes in decentralized clinical trials. In March 2024, the company was acquired by eMed, LLC.

== History ==
Science 37 was founded in 2014 by Noah Craft and Belinda Tan, working out of LA BioMed at Harbor-UCLA Medical Center.

Their team developed the Network Oriented Research Assistant platform, also known as the NORA platform, which includes video chat, digital self-photography, data collection, and electronic consent. Together, these features were used to conduct “site-less” trials.

The platform also aided researchers in finding and contacting potential participants, and scheduling trial participants for in-home activities like questionnaires, mobile nurse visits, and door-step study medicine delivery.

Science 37 received its initial round of funding in 2015, with a $6.5 million investment, co-led by Lux Capital and dRx Capital. In 2016 the company's second round of financing resulted in $31 million in funding, and a 2017 round of financing resulted in $29 million. In March 2019, Science 37 secured $35 million in Series D funding; and announced a leadership transition with David Coman coming in as CEO in November 2019.

In August 2020 Science 37 closed an oversubscribed Series D $40 million funding round led by Lux Capital, Redmile Group and PPD, Inc. (other investors: Novartis, Amgen, Sanofi Ventures, GV, Glynn Capital, LifeSci Ventures and Mubadala Ventures). In May 2021, Science 37 announced that they are to become publicly listed via merger with LifeSci Acquisition II Corp.

== Partnerships ==
In 2015 Science 37 began working with Genentech in the recruitment of trial participants. In 2017 Science 37 then completed a site-less trial for AOBiome Therapeutics. This was the first “interventional, randomized, placebo-controlled trial” to be completed virtually. That year Science 37 also began planning site-less trials for Sanofi and Otsuka Pharmaceutical.

In 2018 the company partnered with Novartis to plan several site-less clinical trials. Novartis also owns 10% of Science 37 from an early-stage investment in the company. Science 37 was already in the process of conducting trials with Novartis in acne, cluster headaches, and fatty liver disease.
