= John Buster =

American physician

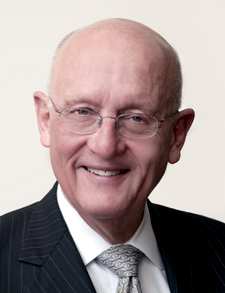
Dr. John E. Buster

John Edmond Buster (born July 18, 1941) is an American physician who, while working at the University of California at Los Angeles School of Medicine, directed the research team that performed the first embryo transfer from one woman to another resulting in a live birth. It was performed at the Harbor-UCLA Medical Center, reported in July 1983, and culminated in the announcement of the birth on February 3, 1984. In the procedure, an embryo that was just beginning to develop was transferred from the woman in whom it had been conceived by artificial insemination to another woman who gave birth to the infant 38 weeks later. The sperm used in the artificial insemination came from the husband of the woman who bore the baby.

Buster and other members of the UCLA research team were featured in People Magazine, and Time Magazine. Building upon Buster's research, over 200,000 live births resulting from donor embryo transfer have been recorded by the Centers for Disease Control(CDC) in the United States.

Buster continues to practice medicine as a reproductive endocrinologist at Women and Infants' Fertility Center in Providence, Rhode Island.

== Education ==
Buster attended Stanford University for his undergraduate degree and earned both his medical degree and residency training in obstetrics and gynecology from the University of California Los Angeles School of Medicine, where he later completed fellowship training in reproductive endocrinology and infertility.

== Career ==
Buster works in the Division of Reproductive Endocrinology and Infertility at Women & Infants Hospital in Providence, Rhode Island. He is also engaged in private practice and in clinical teaching of Reproductive Endocrinology and Infertility at the Women & Infants/Alpert Medical School (Brown University) fellowship in reproductive endocrinology and infertility.

== Research ==
Buster's research and clinical practice in reproductive medicine include published studies in steroid physiology, pre-implantation embryology, pregnancy loss, and menopausal hormone replacement therapy.

Buster authored "Sex and the 50-Something Woman: Strategies for Restoring Satisfaction" in the journal Contemporary Obstetrics and Gynecology. The intent was to explain the various causes of female sexual dysfunction (FSD) and the simple interventions obstetrician/gynecologists and primary care physicians can recommend. The article attracted national interest with stories appearing in local media.

One of Buster's earliest research studies focused on steroid hormone radioimmunoassay (RIA). He reported an RIA for the androgen prohormone, dehydroepiandrosterone sulfate (DHEA-S), the direct measurement of which was shown to be possible in un-extracted serum. Refined versions of his methodology are used in the diagnosis and management of androgen excess disorders in women. He also described for the first time the simultaneous progression of multiple androgen, progestin, and estrogen concentrations in maternal blood throughout all three trimesters of pregnancy and into the onset of labor.

Buster helped develop a testosterone delivery system for women researched by Procter & Gamble. It is marketed in Europe under the brand name Intrinsa. Buster served as lead investigator in another study demonstrating the effectiveness of an estradiol mist, which has pharmacology similar to those of a trans-dermal estrogen patches. Sold in the United States by Perrigo under the name Evamist, it received FDA approval in 2007. Buster's Phase III Study for Evamist was published in the journal, Obstetrics & Gynecology.

In the early 1980s, over a period of 4 years, at the University of California at Los Angeles School of Medicine, Buster and his team developed a technique based on in vivo fertilization and uterine lavage – a method adapted from the commercialization of bovine embryo transfer in the cattle industry – as a means to transfer human blastocysts from fertile woman donors to ovulating or agonadal infertile recipient women. In February 1984, the first live birth, followed 3 months later by a second live birth, resulted from these techniques and was reported by Buster and his team.

Buster updated the uterine lavage technology adapting it to diagnosis and prevention of genetic diseases in embryos. In 2011 Buster founded Previvo Genetics, Inc. He serves on the Board of Directors and Scientific Board.

In April 2019 at the International Federation of Fertility Societies (IFFS) World Congress in Shanghai, China, Buster presented the preliminary results from the first Preimplantation Genetic Testing (PGT) using in vivo Embryos recovered by Uterine Lavage.

In January, 2020, Buster with the Previvo research team reported the first large series (134 hyper stimulation/lavage cycles) describing the successful and safe recovery of 136 in vivo fertilized and matured embryos using in vivo uterine lavage (IVL). For controls, 20 of the lavage subjects also underwent in vitro fertilization (IVF). Most significantly the morphology scores of the IVL blastocysts were significantly higher than the IVF controls.

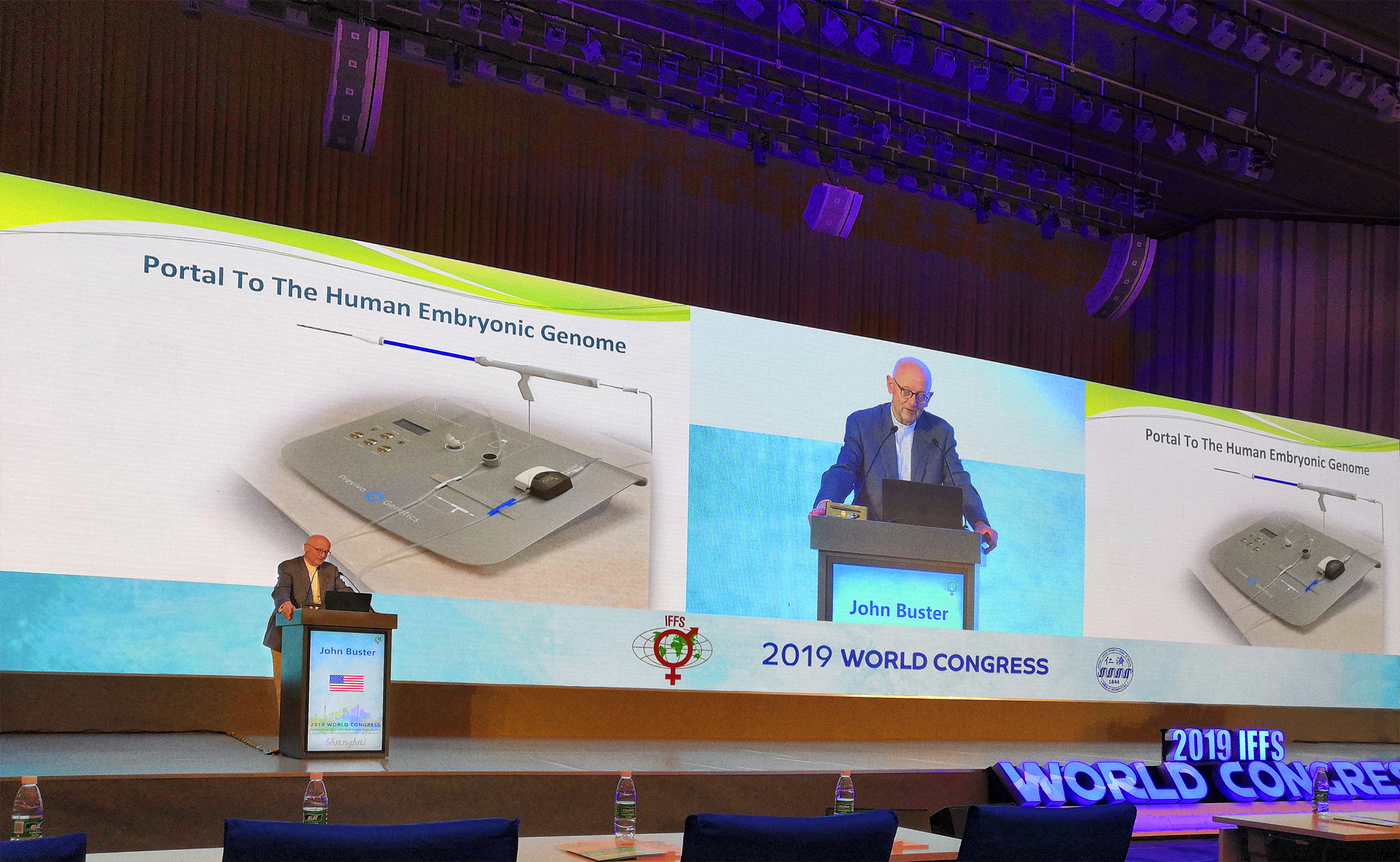

== Awards and honors ==
Buster received the Legends Award in May 2012 from LA BioMed located at Harbor-UCLA Medical Center.

In June 2014 the American College of Obstetricians and Gynecologists (ACOG) awarded a permanently endowed lectureship, the John E. Buster, M.D. lectureship on cutting edge reproductive medicine. This lecture is given annually.

== Publications ==
- Buster, JohnE.; Bustillo, Maria; Thorneycroft, IanH.; Simon, JamesA.; Boyers, StephenP.; Marshall, JohnR.; Louw, JohnA.; Seed, RandolphW.; Seed, RichardG. (July 1983). "Non-surgical transfer of in vivo fertilised donated ova to five infertile women: report of two pregnancies". The Lancet. 322 (8343): 223–224. doi:10.1016/S0140-6736(83)90208-8. PMID 6135059. S2CID 205999689.
- Bustillo, M; Buster, JE; Cohen, SW; Hamilton, F; Thorneycroft, IH; Simon, JA; Rodi, IA; Boyers, SP; Marshall, JR; Louw, JA (17 February 1984). "Delivery of a healthy infant following nonsurgical ovum transfer". JAMA. 251 (7): 889. doi:10.1001/jama.1984.03340310011002. PMID 6694286.
- Buster, JohnE.; Bustillo, Maria; Thorneycroft, Ian; Simon, JamesA.; Boyers, StephenP.; Marshall, JohnR.; Seed, RichardG.; Louw, JohnA. (April 1983). "Non-surgical transfer of an in-vivo fertilised donated ovum to an infertility patient". The Lancet. 321 (8328): 816–817. doi:10.1016/S0140-6736(83)91868-8. PMID 6132146. S2CID 38672184.
- Buster, John E. (2008). "The first live birth donation". Society for Reproductive Medicine. 4 (4): 23–8.
- Center for Disease Control and Prevention/Society for Assisted Reproductive Technology Fertility Clinic Reports, 1994–2006.
- Buster, John E.; Bustillo, Maria; Rodi, Ingrid A.; Cohen, Sydlee W.; Hamilton, Minda; Simon, James A.; Thorneycroft, Ian H.; Marshall, John R. (September 1985). "Biologic and morphologic development of donated human ova recovered by nonsurgical uterine lavage". American Journal of Obstetrics and Gynecology. 153 (2): 211–217. doi:10.1016/0002-9378(85)90116-4. PMID 4037016.
- Buster JE, Abraham GE: Radioimmunoassay of plasma dehydroepiandrosterone sulfate. Analyt Lett 5:543:551, 1972.
- Buster JE, Freeman AG, Hobel CJ: An algorithm for determining gestational age from unconjugated estriol levels. Obstet Gynecol. Nov; 56 (5): 649–655, 1980.
- Buster JE, Chang RJ, Preston DL, Elashoff RM, Cousins LM, Abraham GE, Hobel CJ, Marshall JR: Interrelationships of circulating maternal steroid concentrations in third trimester pregnancies: II. C18 and C19 steroids: estradiol, estriol, dihydro-epiandrosterone, dehydroepiandrosterone sulfate, ∆5androstenedione, testosterone, and dihydrotestosterone. J Clin Endocrinol Metab 48 (1): 139–142, 1979.
- Buster JE, Change RJ, Preston, DL, Elashoff RM, Cousins LM, Abraham GE, Hobel, CJ, Marshall JR: Interrelationships of circulating maternal steroid concentrations in third trimester pregnancies. I. C21 steroids: progesterone, 16ά-hydroxyprogesterone, 17ά -hydroxy-progesterone, 20ά-dihydroprogesterone, ∆5-pregnenolone, ∆5-pregnenonlone sulfate and 17-hydroxy ∆5-pregnenolone. J Clin Endocrinol Metab 48 (1) 33–38, 1979
- Rodi IA, Sauer MV, Gorrill MJ, Bustillo M, Gunning JE, Buster JE, Marshall JR: The medical treatment of unruptured ectopic pregnancy with methotrexate and citrovorum rescue: preliminary experience. Fertil Steril. Nov;46 (5): 811–813, 1986.
- Carson SA, Buster JE: Ectopic pregnancy. N Engl J Med. Oct; 329 (16): 1174–1181, 1993.
- Buster JE, Kingsberg SA, Aguirre O, Brown C, Breaux JG, Buch A, Rodenberg CA, Wekselman K, Casson P: Testosterone Patch for Low Sexual Desire in Surgically Menopausal Women: A Randomized Trial. Obstet Gynecol, 2005 May; 105(5 Pt 1):944-52.
- Buster JE, Koltun WD, Pascual MLG, Day WW, Peterson C: Low-dose estradiol spray to treat vasomotor symptoms. Obstet Gynecol 111: 1343–1351, 2008.
- Buster, JE. Principles of Oocyte and Embryo Donation (Sauer M, ed). "Historical "Evolution of Oocyte and Embryo Donation as a Treatment for Intractable Infertility" Chapter 1, pp 1–10. ISBN 0387949607.
