= Victor Darley-Usmar =

British biochemist

Victor Darley-Usmar (born 1956) is a free-radical biologist and biochemist, the UAB Endowed Professor in Mitochondrial Medicine and Pathology at the University of Alabama at Birmingham. Darley-Usmar also contributed to a book titled Microbes, Bugs & Wonder Drugs (by Fran Balkwill and Mic Rolph, with Victor Darley-Usmar), a science book written for young readers and their families.

== Scientific background ==
Dr. Darley-Usmar got his B.Sc. from Essex University in Biochemistry in 1976, and followed that by getting a PhD from Essex University in 1980. He then did a postdoctoral fellowship at the University of Oregon from 1980 to 1983. Darley-Usmar then accepted a position as an assistant professor at the University of Tsukuba Medical School in Ibaraki, Japan, where he taught for 2 years. He then moved to Beckenham, Kent, England to be a Senior Biochemist at Wellcome Research Laboratories, where he stayed for 10 years. In 1995, he was recruited to University of Alabama at Birmingham, where he is now a professor.

Darley-Usmar has held several leadership positions during his time at UAB. He has been the graduate program director for the Department of Pathology, the associate dean for the Office of Post-Doctoral Education, the chair of the Conflict of Interest Review Board, and has been the interim director for the Division of Molecular and Cellular Pathology twice. He is currently the director of the Centre for Free Radical Biology and the vice-chair of Research for the Department of Pathology.

Darley-Usmar is also past president of the Society for Free Radical Biology and Medicine, and is one of the two editors-in-chief of the journal Redox Biology.

== Awards ==
- 2012 Lifetime Achievement Award, Society for Free Radical Biology and Medicine.
- 2009: Deans Award for Excellence in Mentoring
- 2006: Award from the UAB Post Doctoral Association for Outstanding Contribution to Post Doctoral Education
- 1998, 2003, 2005: Most Valued Faculty Member: Awarded by graduate students in the Molecular and Cellular Pathology Program.
- 2001: Outstanding volunteer for the Oxygen Society.
- 1996: Highly Commended Award for the British Medical Association Medical Book Competition for Microbes Bugs and Wonder Drugs.

== Research interests ==
Among the most serious diseases that effect developed nations are those involving the cardiovascular system. Typical examples include atherosclerosis and the vascular complications of hypertension and diabetes. It is now known that this is mainly due to the production of free radicals and their interactions in the cells of the artery wall. The focus of Darley-Usmar's laboratory is to understand how the signaling pathways are altered in vascular disease and how free radicals play a part in this.

Two areas are of particular interest to Darley-Usmar. 1) Those involving oxidized lipoproteins and 2) the free radical signaling molecule nitric oxide. Nitric oxide is one of the beneficial free radicals in the artery wall and in a series of studies over the last few years he has been determining how it exerts protection over the vasculature. Dr. Darley-Usmar is particularly interested in how the interaction of mitochondria with NO can modulate cell signaling. With an extensive network of collaborators at UAB and at other national and international institutions, he is defining the molecular events which control NO signaling pathways in the diseased vessel wall. Darley-Usmar's approach is to use his insight into the biochemistry of free radicals to understand events at the cellular level. Recently, he has found that NO activates a previously uncharacterized signaling pathway in the mitochondrion that increases synthesis of intracellular antioxidants in the cell in addition to directly inactivating damaging free radicals. His lab uses molecular biology, proteomics, and cellular approaches to address these problems.

== Selected publications ==
- Sruti Shiva, Paul S. Brookes, Rakesh P. Patel, Peter G. Anderson, and Victor M. Darley-Usmar. Nitric oxide partitioning into mitochondrial membranes and the control of respiration at cytochrome c oxidase. PNAS 2001. .
- Paul S. Brookes, David W. Kraus, Sruti Shiva, Jeannette E. Doeller, Maria-Cecilia Barone, Rakesh P. Patel, Jack R. Lancaster Jr., and Victor Darley-Usmar. Control of Mitochondrial Respiration by NO, Effects of Low Oxygen and Respiratory State. JBC 2003.
