= American College of Medical Genetics and Genomics =

Organisation

The American College of Medical Genetics and Genomics (ACMG) is an organization composed of biochemical, clinical, cytogenetic, medical and molecular geneticists, genetic counselors, and other health care professionals committed to the practice of medical genetics.

Melanie J. Wells, MPH, CAE, was named CEO in April 2023 and stepped down in November 2025. As of 2026, Melissa Forburger is the interim CEO.

== History ==
The ACMG was founded in 1991 to represent doctoral-level practitioners and investigators of medical genetics.

In 1993, ACMG publishes the first edition of the ACMG Standards and Guidelines for Clinical Genetic Laboratories.

The first Annual Clinical Genetic Meeting is held in 1994. Next year, the College becomes a full member of the Council of Medical Specialty Societies.

ACMG has an Official Journal, Genetics in Medicine. The first issue was released in 1998.

In 2011, the organization's board of directors voted to change its name from the "American College of Medical Genetics" to "American College of Medical Genetics and Genomics".

== Mission statement ==
ACMG aims to develop clinical practice guidelines; laboratory services directories, databases, population screening guidelines and to establish uniform laboratory standards, quality assurance and proficiency testing.

== Ethical guidelines for pediatric genetic testing ==
ACMG and the American Academy of Pediatrics have jointly published guidelines in dealing with the ethical issues in pediatric genetic testing.
