= Joel D. Kopple =

- Born: March 26, 1938 (age 88); Chicago, Illinois
- Citizenship: United States
- Education: Northwestern University, University of Illinois College of Medicine
- Known for: Founded the International Federation of Kidney Foundations (IFKF), conceived the idea of World Kidney Day in 2003
- Scientific career
- Fields: nephrology, internal medicine, nutrition, public health
- Workplaces: Harbor-UCLA Medical Center UCLA

Joel D. Kopple is an American professor, physician, and clinical investigator in medicine, nephrology, nutrition, and public health. He is a professor at David Geffen UCLA School of Medicine and UCLA Fielding School of Public Health. He served from 1982 to 2007 as the chief of the Division of Nephrology and Hypertension at Harbor-UCLA Medical Center.

== Joel D Kopple Awards ==
To recognize the contributions of Kopple to advancing the field of Renal Nutrition, the National Kidney Foundation and its Council on Renal Nutrition created the Joel D Kopple Award in Renal Nutrition, which is annually granted to a distinguished individual for their efforts to advance the field of renal nutrition.

The International Federation of Kidney Foundations has created a separate Joel D. Kopple Award which is given to a person or group that has made a major contribution to the health or well-being of people with or at risk for kidney disease.

== Contributions ==
Kopple's research focus has been on amino acid and protein metabolism and nutritional disorders and their management in kidney disease and kidney failure. He has authored or co-authored many hundreds of peer-reviewed manuscripts, invited papers and chapters. He is an editor of many proceedings and symposia and an editor of the textbook entitled Nutritional Management of Renal Disease. He founded the International Society of Renal Nutrition and Metabolism, the International Federation of Kidney Foundations, and World Kidney Day, served a central role in founding other institutions, and served as president of the National Kidney Foundation and several professional and scientific societies.

== Awards and honors ==
Kopple is an elected Fellow of the American Society for Nutrition (2006) and is a Fellow of the American Society of Nephrology. He has received many awards. Among these, he was the 1993 recipient of the David M. Hume Memorial Award by the National Kidney Foundation. He also received the 2004 Robert H. Herman Memorial Award and the 1997 E.V. McCollum Award from the American Society for Nutrition. He received the Belding Scribner Award of the American Society of Nephrology in 2006.

Kopple received honorary doctorate degrees from the University of Pavol Jozef Šafárik in 1995, the University of Szeged in 2002 and the University d'Auvergne in 2010.
