= Clinical Radiology =

- Discipline: Radiology
- Language: English

Publication details
- Publisher: Elsevier
- Impact factor: 3.389 (2021)

Standard abbreviations
- ISO 4: Clin. Radiol.

Links
- Journal homepage; Online archive

Clinical Radiology is a medical journal that covers the aspects of clinical radiology, including: computed tomography, magnetic resonance imaging, ultrasonography etc. The journal is published by Elsevier.

== Abstracting and indexing ==
The journal is abstracted and indexed in:

- Scopus
- Biological Abstracts
- Chemical Abstracts
- Elsevier BIOBASE
- Current Contents - Clinical Medicine
- Embase
- Nuclear Science Abstracts
- Research Alert
- Science Citation Index
- Social Sciences Citation Index
- CINAHL
- Sociedad Iberoamericana de Informacion Cientifica (SIIC) Data Bases
- PubMed/Medline

According to the Journal Citation Reports, the journal has a 2021 impact factor of 3.389.
