= International Society of Renal Nutrition and Metabolism =

- Founded: 1977
- Founder: Joel D. Kopple
- Type: Medical
- Purpose: Nutrition, kidney disease, medical research, education and public policy
- Location(s): Atlanta, United States and Würzburg, Germany
- Region served: Worldwide,
- Members: c. 500
- Key people: Angela Wang (president), Steven Rus Price (president-elect), Harold Franch (past president), Pieter ter Wee (president-elect), Alp Ikizler (Past President), Kamyar Kalantar-Zadeh(Past President)
- Website: www.RenalNutrition.com

The International Society of Renal Nutrition and Metabolism (ISRNM) is a learned society on nephrology that has the objective of advancing knowledge, education and awareness pertaining to nutrition and metabolism in kidney disease by fostering communication of the advancements of knowledge in renal nutrition. The ISRNM website states that it promotes expert patient care, advances medical research, and educates the kidney community on the role of nutrition in chronic kidney disease and acute kidney injury including the role of nutritional status, uremic malnutrition, protein-energy wasting, and dietary derangement. The site also mentions a role in informing policymakers about issues of relevant to kidney and nutrition communities and the patients.

== Journal ==
The official publication of the ISRNM is the Journal of Renal Nutrition, which is also the official journal of the Council on Renal Nutrition and of the National Kidney Foundation.

== Membership ==
The ISRNM consists of members and associate members.

=== Member ===
ISRNM member can be any person holding the degree of M.D., D.O., MBBS, or Ph.D. "or its equivalent who has demonstrated a major, active and continuing interest in nutrition or metabolism in renal disease and renal failure shall be eligible for membership in the Society."

=== Associate member ===
ISRNM associate member is "any person holding a baccalaureate degree who has a continuing interest in nutrition or metabolism in renal disease and renal failure shall be eligible for membership in the Society."

== History ==
In the mid-1970s, there was increased scientific research concerning abnormal metabolism of proteins, lipids, carbohydrates, vitamins, and minerals in renal disease and the nutritional management of patients with renal disease had changed as a result of these new developments. Several investigators, including Joel D. Kopple, Shaul G. Massry, and August Heidland, organized a scientific congress held in Wurzburg, Germany in 1977 to bring together investigators interested in the science of renal nutrition. From then on, this congress has been organized every few years, currently at a biannual rhythm. The International Society of Renal Nutrition and Metabolism was formally organized in the early 1990s to organize the meetings, but remained a small organization until the mid-2000s. After that time, it began to co-publish the Journal of Renal Nutrition with the National Kidney Foundation and publish position papers.

== International meetings ==
The scientific meetings are referred to as the "International Congress in Renal Nutrition and Metabolism" and organized every second year.
