= Kidney Research UK =

UK charitable organization

Kidney Research UK is the largest charity in the UK that funds research that focuses on the prevention, treatment and management of kidney disease with the aim to free lives from kidney disease. The vision of the charity is to free lives from the restrictions, fear, anxiety and life limiting nature of kidney disease. The charity was founded in 1961 and was formerly known as the National Kidney Research Fund.

== Research ==
The purpose of the charity is to use donations to fund research to:

- Prevent kidney disease by finding ways to see it coming, and developing interventions to stop it happening.
- End kidney failure by learning how to spot disease early, how to identify and slow down or stop progression, and how to reverse or repair kidney damage.
- Transform treatments by making dialysis and transplantation more tolerable and effective, until better alternatives are available.

== Awareness ==
Kidney disease affects three million people in the UK, treatments can be gruelling and currently there is no cure. The charity takes part in World Kidney Day each year to try to raise awareness of the rising threat of kidney disease. Kidney Research UK say that "The purpose of World Kidney Day is to spread the message that kidney disease is common, harmful and treatable."

== Funding ==
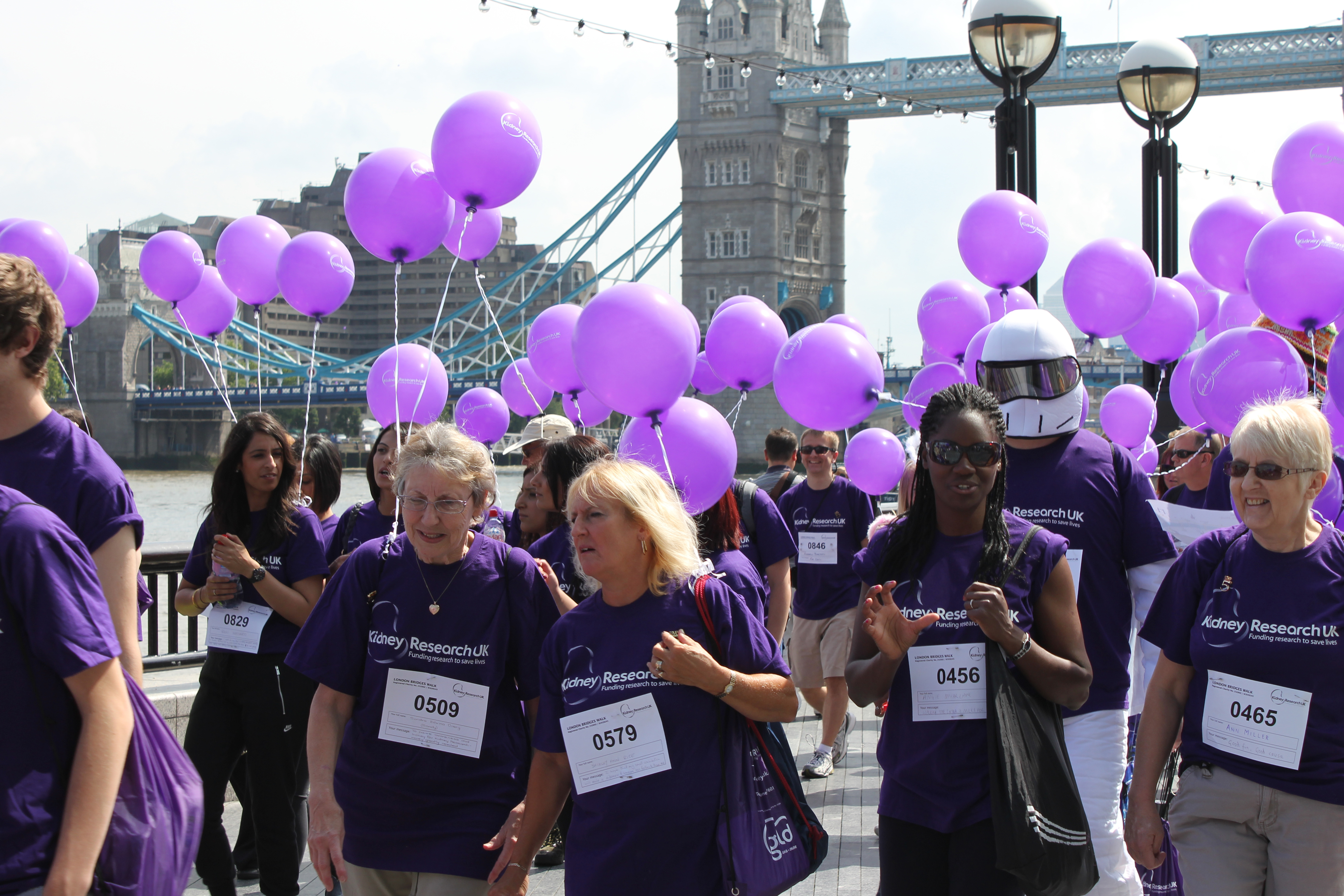
London Bridges Walk 2011

Kidney Research UK depends on the support of the general public to fund their research; they receive almost no Government financial support.

=== Events ===
One area of fundraising which generates income for the charity is its events programme. Its annual London Bridges Walk attracts over 1800 participants every year and takes place across some of London most famous bridges. Other fundraising events include skydives, marathons and other challenge events.
