= NKRF (gene) =

Protein-coding gene in the species Homo sapiens

Identifiers
- Aliases: NKRF, ITBA4, NRF, NFKB repressing factor
- External IDs: OMIM: 300440; MGI: 1924536; GeneCards: NKRF

Gene location (Human)
Chr.	X chromosome (human)
Band	Xq24	Start	119,588,337 bp
Band	Xq24	End	119,606,443 bp

Gene location (Mouse)
Chr.	X chromosome (mouse)
Band	X|X A3.3	Start	36,151,193 bp
Band	X|X A3.3	End	36,167,166 bp
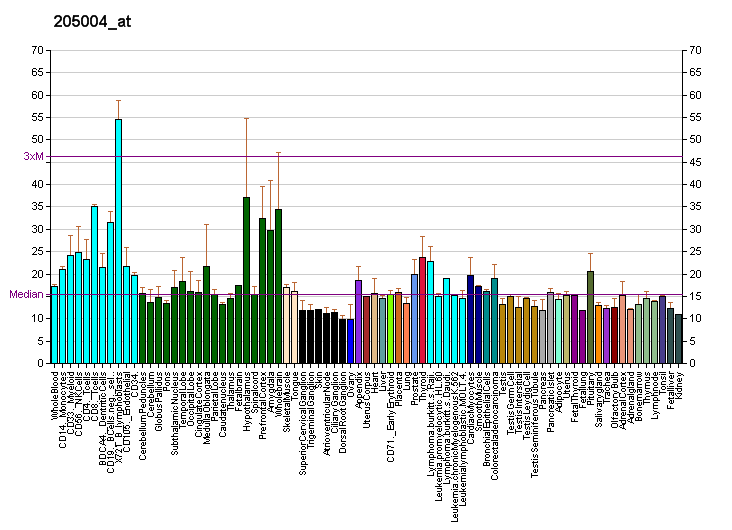
RNA expression pattern
Bgee	Human / Mouse (ortholog); Top expressed in: postcentral gyrus; Brodmann area 23; superior frontal gyrus; middle temporal gyrus; gonad; entorhinal cortex; primary visual cortex; Brodmann area 46; pons; prefrontal cortex / Top expressed in: pontine nuclei; medial vestibular nucleus; dorsal tegmental nucleus; ventral tegmental area; lateral hypothalamus; primitive streak; facial motor nucleus; deep cerebellar nuclei; spinal cord; superior colliculus; More reference expression data
BioGPS	More reference expression data
Gene ontology
Molecular function	DNA binding; protein binding; nucleic acid binding; RNA binding; RNA polymerase II cis-regulatory region sequence-specific DNA binding; DNA-binding transcription activator activity, RNA polymerase II-specific
Cellular component	nucleus; nucleolus; nucleoplasm
Biological process	negative regulation of transcription, DNA-templated; regulation of transcription, DNA-templated; transcription, DNA-templated; transcription by RNA polymerase II; positive regulation of transcription by RNA polymerase II
Sources:Amigo / QuickGO
Orthologs
Databases	NCBI: entry; OMA: entry
Species	Human	Mouse
Entrez	55922	77286
Ensembl	ENSG00000186416	ENSMUSG00000044149
UniProt	O15226	Q8BY02
RefSeq (mRNA)	NM_001173487; NM_001173488; NM_017544	NM_029891
RefSeq (protein)	NP_060014	NP_084167
Location (UCSC)	Chr X: 119.59 – 119.61 Mb	Chr X: 36.15 – 36.17 Mb
PubMed search
- Wikidata
View/Edit Human	View/Edit Mouse

NF-kappa-B-repressing factor is a protein that in humans is encoded by the NKRF gene.

This gene encodes a transcription factor that interacts with specific negative regulatory elements (NREs) to mediate transcriptional repression of certain NK-kappa-B-responsive genes.

The protein localizes predominantly to the nucleolus with a small fraction found in the nucleoplasm and cytoplasm.
