= Nephrology Dialysis Transplantation =

- Discipline: nephrology, dialysis, organ transplantation
- Language: English
- Edited by: Denis Fouque

Publication details
- History: 1986–present
- Publisher: Oxford University Press on behalf of the European Renal Association - European Dialysis and Transplant Association
- Frequency: Monthly
- Impact factor: 7.186 (2021)

Standard abbreviations
- ISO 4: Nephrol. Dial. Transplant.

Indexing
- CODEN: NDTREA
- ISSN: 0931-0509 (print); 1460-2385 (web)
- OCLC no.: 15991387

Links
- Journal homepage; Online access; Online archive

The Nephrology Dialysis Transplantation is a monthly peer-reviewed medical journal. It is published by Oxford University Press on behalf of the European Renal Association - European Dialysis and Transplant Association. It is abstracted and indexed in PubMed/MEDLINE/Index Medicus. According to the Journal Citation Reports, the journal has a 2021 impact factor of 7.186. The journal's current editor-in-chief is Denis Fouque (Centre Hospitalier Lyon Sud, Pierre-Bénite, France).
