= Harbor–UCLA Medical Center =

Coordinates: 33.8298°N 118.2947°W

- Los Angeles County Department of Health Services

Geography
- Location: 1000 W Carson St., Torrance, Los Angeles County, California, United States

Organization
- Care system: Public
- Type: Teaching
- Affiliated university: University of California, Los Angeles

Services
- Emergency department: Level I Adult Trauma Center / Level I Pediatric Trauma Center
- Beds: 570

History
- Founded: 1946

Links
- Website: dhs.lacounty.gov/harbor
- Lists: Hospitals in California

Harbor–UCLA Medical Center is a 570-bed public teaching hospital located at 1000 West Carson Street in West Carson, an unincorporated area within Los Angeles County, California. The hospital is owned by Los Angeles County and operated by the Los Angeles County Department of Health Services, while doctors are faculty of the David Geffen School of Medicine at UCLA, who oversee the medical residents being trained at the facility.

The facility is one of two adult level I trauma centers (providing the highest level of surgical care to trauma patients) operated by Los Angeles County; the other is Los Angeles General Medical Center.

== History ==
A medical facility was originally opened on the site in 1943 as the U.S. Army's Port of Embarkation Hospital, which was a receiving point for the wounded returned from the Pacific theater during World War II. Situated on a tract of 80 acres (32 ha), it had an administration building and a large number of barracks wards arranged under the cottage system.

In February 1946, the county purchased the facility from the Federal Government in order to decentralize the activities of the Los Angeles County General Hospital, one of the largest institutions of its kind in the world, and founded a branch hospital to serve the South Bay and Long Beach areas.

The Los Angeles County Harbor General Hospital began its affiliation with UCLA School of Medicine in 1951. Construction of the present eight-story hospital building was completed in late 1962 on the easterly portion of the grounds, at Carson Street and Vermont Avenue, replacing a number of the wooden barracks and cottages comprising Harbor General. It was dedicated January 14, 1963.

Affiliation with the UCLA School of Dentistry was established in 1972. On September 1, 1978, the name of the hospital changed officially to Los Angeles County Harbor–UCLA Medical Center in order to draw attention to its working relationship with the UCLA School of Medicine.

On December 13, 1983, the Los Angeles County Board of Supervisors approved the Harbor–UCLA Medical Center as one of the first six trauma centers in Los Angeles County, all of which were designated Level I. The Supervisors stipulated that they be open for business at 8 a.m. two days later. Two more (UCLA Medical Center and Cedars-Sinai Medical Center) gained Level I status later that month and still have that standing today. Today, Harbor-UCLA is the only Level I trauma center south of the Santa Monica Freeway and Santa Ana Freeway as well as west of the Los Angeles-Orange County line.

The Harbor–UCLA Medical Center campus is home to The Lundquist Institute for Biomedical Innovation, an independent, not-for-profit research institute. Originally known as the Harbor-UCLA Research and Education Institute (REI), then as The Los Angeles Biomedical Research Institute (LA BioMed), The Lundquist Institute has been conducting biomedical research, training young scientists and providing community services, such as one of California's largest and most comprehensive Women, Infants and Children (WIC) Programs.

== In popular culture ==
The main eight-story hospital building became known the world over as the fictional "Rampart General Hospital" in the popular 1972 to 1977 television series, Emergency!. The emergency receiving area as seen in the television series was completely remodeled in the 2000s, and no longer appears as it did in the show.

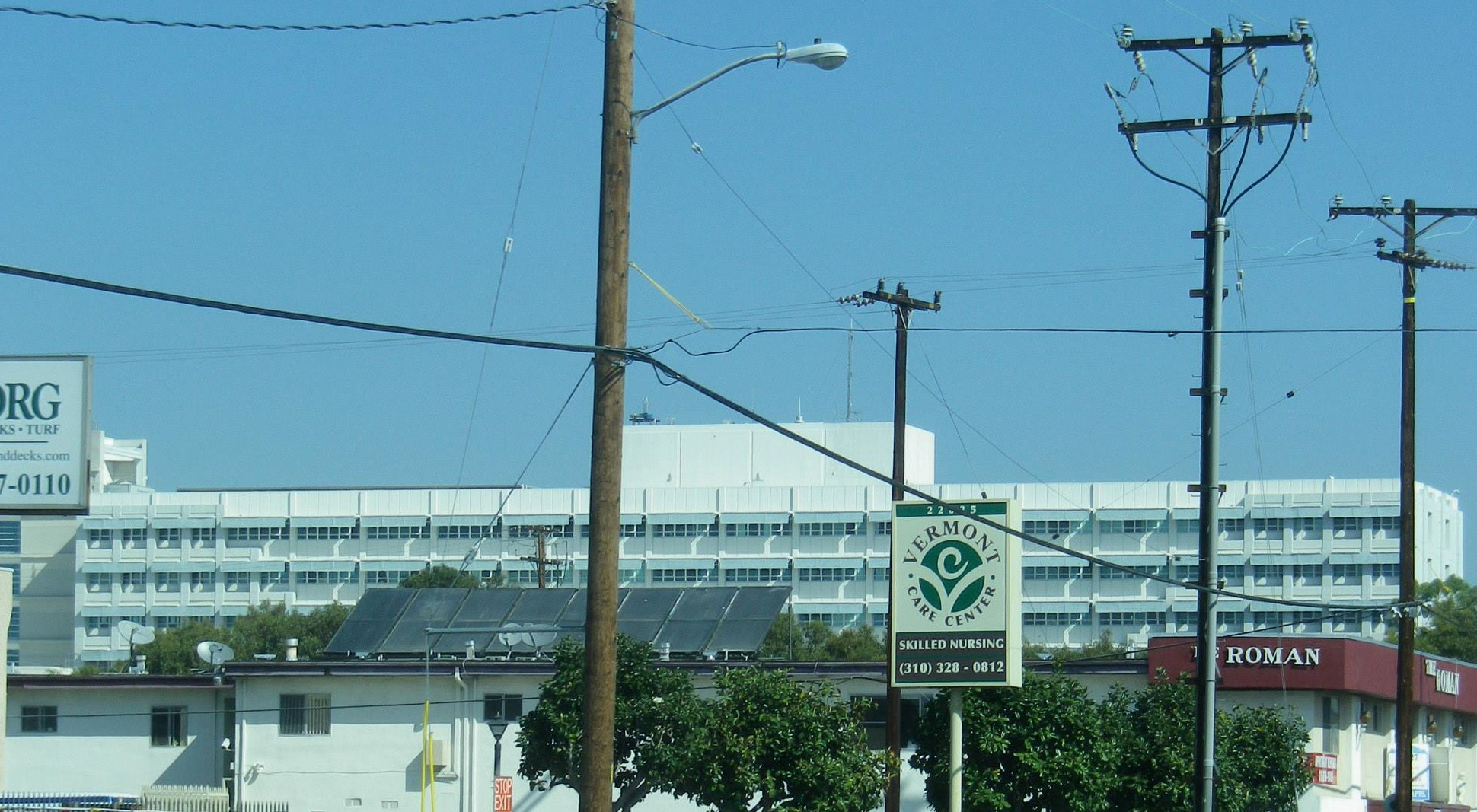
Harbor–UCLA Medical Center; taken Sat. March 28, 2015 ~forty years after the show was filmed.

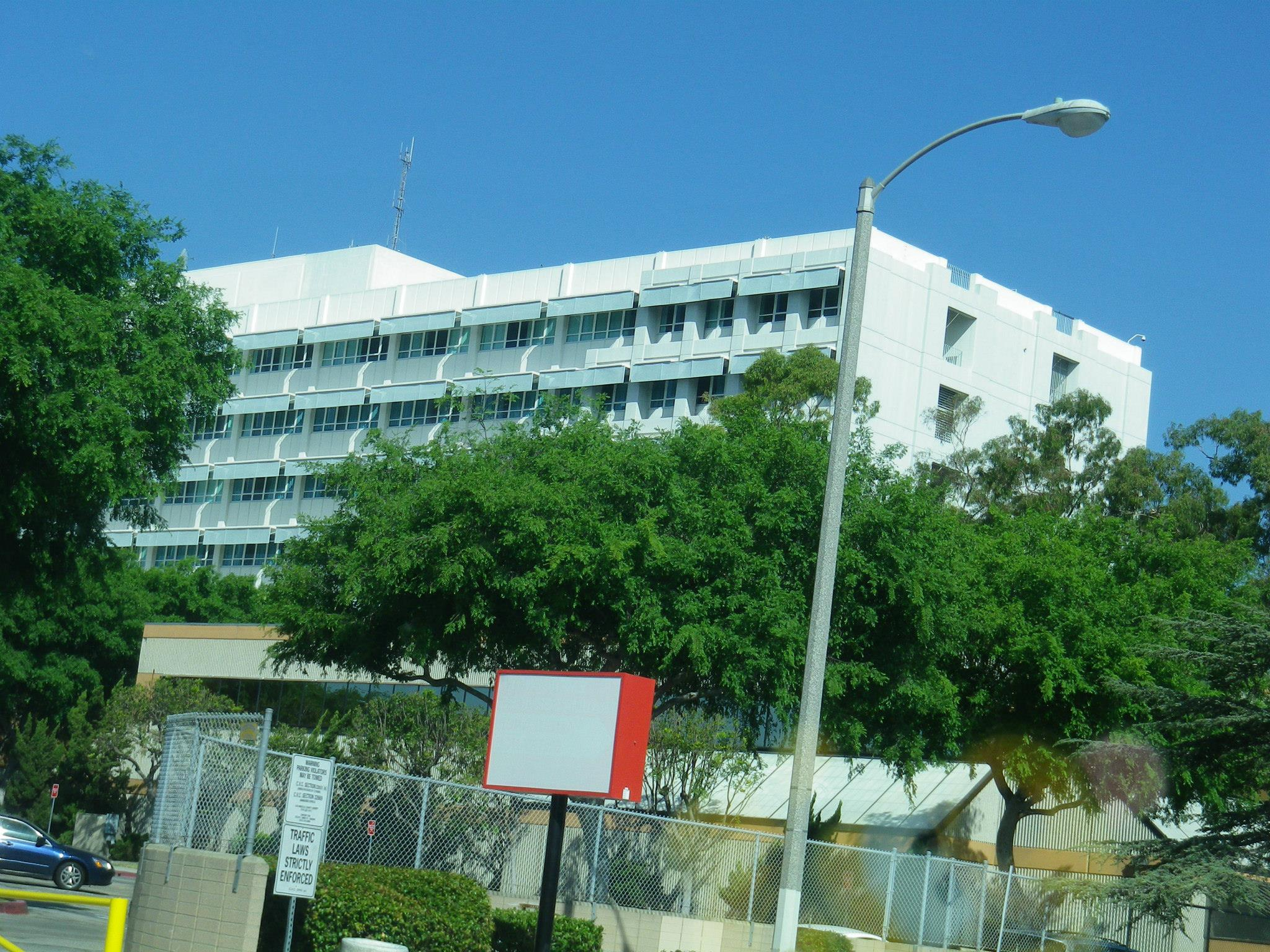
Harbor–UCLA Medical Center; taken Sat. March 28, 2015 ~forty years after the show was filmed.

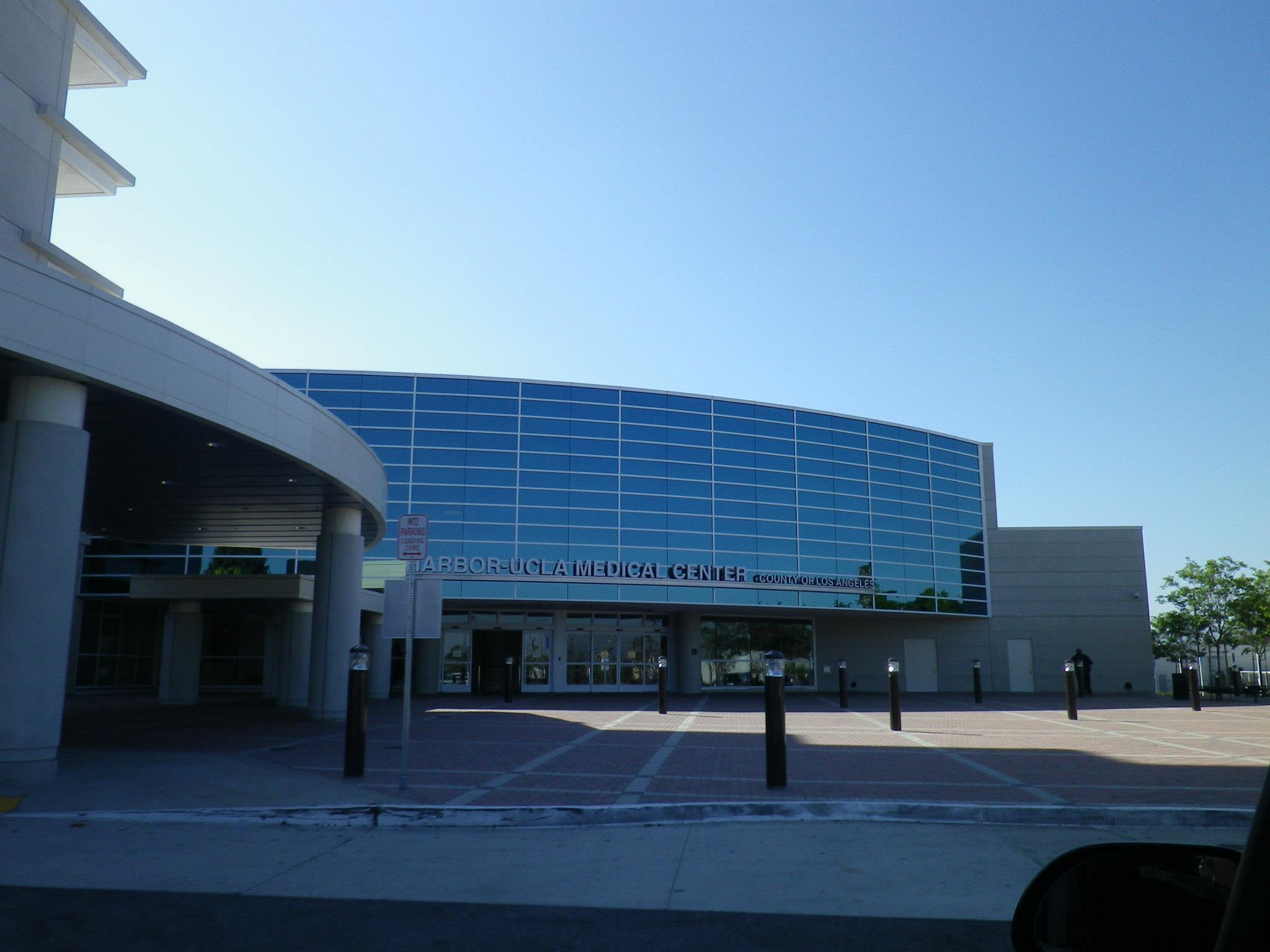
Harbor–UCLA Medical Center; taken Sat. March 28, 2015 ~forty years after the show was filmed.

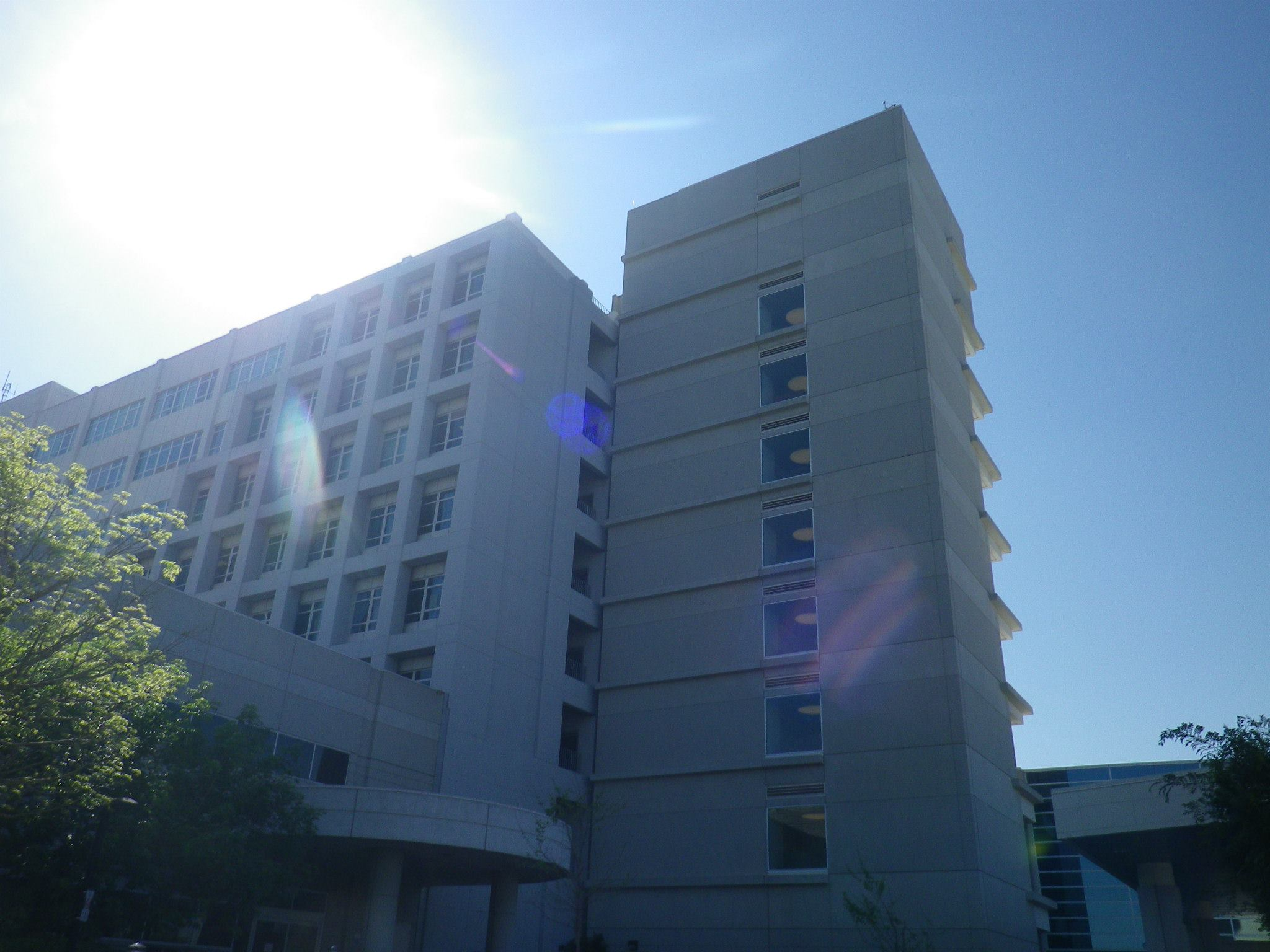
Harbor–UCLA Medical Center; taken Sat. March 28, 2015 ~forty years after the show was filmed.

== Innovations ==
Pioneering research in many fields such as reproductive endocrinology, genetics, infectious diseases, trauma and respiratory medicine has brought worldwide attention to the Harbor-UCLA campus. Among the major milestones are:

- In 1984, Harbor-UCLA was the first institution in the world to achieve successful pregnancies using the technique of ovum transfer. The research team was directed by Dr. John Buster that performed history's first embryo transfer from one woman to another resulting in a live birth and led to the announcement on February 3, 1984. In the procedure, an embryo that was just beginning to develop was transferred from one woman in whom it had been conceived by artificial insemination to another woman who gave birth to the infant 38 weeks later. The sperm used in the artificial insemination came from the husband of the woman who bore the baby.

This scientific breakthrough established standards and became an agent of change for women suffering from the afflictions of infertility and for women who did not want to pass on genetic disorders to their children. Donor embryo transfer has given women a mechanism to become pregnant and give birth to a child that will contain their husband's genetic makeup. Although donor embryo transfer as practiced today has evolved from the original non-surgical method, it now accounts for approximately 5% of in vitro fertilization recorded births.

This work established the technical foundation and legal-ethical framework surrounding the clinical use of human oocyte and embryo donation, a mainstream clinical practice, which has evolved over the past 25 years.

Building upon Dr. Buster's groundbreaking research and since the initial birth announcement in 1984, well over 47,000 live births resulting from donor embryo transfer have been and continue to be recorded by the Centers for Disease Control (CDC) in the United States to infertile women, who otherwise would not have had children by any other existing method.

- The discovery by A.F. Parlow, PhD, of the molecular structure of the human follicle stimulating hormone (FSH) and luteinizing hormone. The Parlow Pituitary Hormone and Antisera Laboratory produces highly purified pituitary components which are used in research and therapy around the world. One of the hormones produced, human growth hormone, is used to prevent severe growth retardation in thousands of children around the world.
- Dr. Delbert Fisher was the first to comprehensively characterize the ontogenesis of fetal thyroid development. He went on to conceptualize and then develop a simple, highly effective newborn screening test for congenital hypothyroidism, including developing the micro assay methods that made it possible to screen on a national scale.
- Internationally renowned genetics research to help treat and prevent short stature, led by Dr. David Rimoin. He was responsible for early work on disorders of growth hormone metabolism, for expanding the knowledge of dwarfism and developing the $2.2 million Skeletal Dysplasia Center at Harbor-UCLA.
- Dr. J. Michael Criley's cardiac research into improved cardiac resuscitation techniques and better training of emergency paramedics, leading to the country's first hospital-based paramedic training program.
- A major discovery in defining the basic biochemical defect in a skin disease, known as x-linked ichthyosis. Dr. Larry Shapiro's discovery that this was a hereditary disease was a significant breakthrough and led to improved treatment strategies.
- Dr. Michael Kaback's advances in developing and improving screening for Tay–Sachs disease, an inherited, fatal disorder. Harbor-UCLA has become the headquarters for the California and international screening programs for the disease.
- Definitive studies of lung surfactant have resulted in saving the lives of thousands of premature infants who would have died because of immature lungs.
- The establishment of the UCLA Center for Vaccine Research. Work at the center has contributed to the licensure of several new vaccines and to the establishment of new national recommendations for childhood immunizations. These new vaccines have protected millions of newborns, children and adults from diseases such as meningitis, whooping cough and pneumonia.
- The development of scintimammography to detect breast cancer without invasive biopsies, is one of the many imaging procedures developed at Harbor-UCLA.
- A detachable balloon catheter, an artificial elbow, and an implant for use in maxillofacial surgery, are among the many devices developed here.
- The receipt of a $1 million grant from the Robert Wood Johnson Foundation and the Pew Charitable Trusts to redesign how patient care is delivered. Harbor-UCLA was one of 20 hospitals nationwide—and the only one on the West Coast—to be awarded the grant. As a result, culture shifts occurred which emphasize leadership, community and the development of interdisciplinary collaboration. The grant also provided seed money and resources to assist with individual and group development.
- FDA approves Endari, developed by Dr. Yutaka Niihara, the first treatment for sickle-cell disease in almost 20 years, and the first ever approved for children

== Controversial research practices ==
In 2025, the Lundquist Institute became the center of a controversy after hosting a study that examined the relationship between LDL cholesterol and arterial plaque in individuals on long-term ketogenic diets, specifically so-called "Lean Mass Hyper-Responders." The study, partly funded by a crowdfunded charity led by software engineer and keto advocate Dave Feldman, was widely criticized for methodological flaws, including the absence of a control group, questionable statistical modeling, and alleged selective reporting of non-calcified plaque volume, its primary endpoint. Critics such as Dr. Spencer Nadolsky and Dr. Kevin Klatt raised ethical concerns about conflicts of interest and transparency, with Klatt asserting that Feldman's vested interests were not properly disclosed. An alarming 42.8% median increase in non-calcified plaque volume was initially omitted from the paper, and only acknowledged after public backlash, leading to further accusations of scientific spin. Although the study passed ethical review, the Lundquist Institute did not respond to multiple requests for comment, fueling skepticism about the Institute's oversight of the research process.

The controversy surrounding the Lundquist Institute–hosted keto study deepened when it was revealed that one of the study's lead proponents, Dave Feldman, publicly shared preliminary results before the research was completed in an effort to recruit participants and solicit crowdfunding. According to Dr. Spencer Nadolsky, who was initially involved in the study's design, Feldman presented early data at a low-carb conference, emphasizing that many participants showed no plaque at baseline. Nadolsky viewed this as Feldman's underhanded way to portray the "Lean Mass Hyper-Responder" phenotype as benign. This tactic raised serious concerns about scientific integrity and the potential for bias, as it involved leveraging unverified data to influence public perception and enrollment. Nadolsky ultimately withdrew from the project and filed an ethical complaint with the institutional review board, which nonetheless allowed the study to proceed. These events contributed to broader criticisms that the study's conduct and oversight failed to meet expected standards for impartial and rigorous research.

== Attached paramedic units ==
Harbor–UCLA Medical Center provides medical control for the following Paramedic units:

- Compton Fire Department – Rescue Ambulance (RA) 41
- Los Angeles Fire Department – RAs 33, 36, 38, 48, 51, 57, 64, 79, 85, 101, and 112
- Los Angeles County Fire Department – Rescue Squads 14, 21, 36, 106, 116, 158, 161 and 171.
- Manhattan Beach Fire Department – RA 21
- Redondo Beach Fire Department – RAs 61 & 62
- Torrance Fire Department- Rescues 91, 93, and 95

== Heliport ==
In September 2013, a new rooftop heliport was completed, equipped with rooftop lights surrounding the helipad and a windsock to indicate the wind direction. The single helipad is capable of being used by helicopters as large as the Sikorsky SH-3 Sea King.

== Notable people ==
- J. Michael Criley, professor at the David Geffen School of Medicine.
- Terry Dubrow, plastic surgeon and television personality.
- Charles Grob, professor and Director of the Division of Child and Adolescent Psychiatry at Harbor–UCLA Medical Center.
- Emil Kakkis, medical geneticist.
- Joel D. Kopple, professor, physician, and clinical investigator in medicine, nephrology, nutrition, and public health.
- David L. Reich, academic anesthesiologist and professor; President & Chief Operating Officer of the Mount Sinai Hospital, and President of Mount Sinai Queens.

== See also ==
- Hospitals in California
- Olive View-UCLA Medical Center
- UCLA Medical Center, Santa Monica
- Ronald Reagan UCLA Medical Center
- Science 37
