= Genetics in Medicine =

- Discipline: Medical genetics
- Language: English
- Edited by: Robert D. Steiner

Publication details
- History: 1998–present
- Publisher: Elsevier
- Frequency: Monthly
- Impact factor: 6.5 (2025)

Standard abbreviations
- ISO 4: Genet. Med.

Indexing
- CODEN: GEMEF3
- ISSN: 1098-3600 (print); 1530-0366 (web)

Links
- Journal homepage; Online current issue; Online archive

Genetics in Medicine is a monthly peer-reviewed medical journal covering medical genetics. It is the official journal of the American College of Medical Genetics and Genomics (ACMG). It was established in 1998 and has been published jointly by Elsevier on behalf of the ACMG since 2022, though it was originally published by Lippincott Williams & Wilkins (1998–2012) and previously published by Nature Publishing Group (2012–21). The editor-in-chief is Robert D. Steiner MD (University of Wisconsin-Madison).

== Abstracting and indexing ==
The journal is abstracted and indexed in:

- Current Contents/Life Sciences
- EMBASE
- Elsevier BIOBASE
- Medline/Index Medicus
- Science Citation Index Expanded

According to the Journal Citation Reports, the journal had a 2020 impact factor of 8.822, ranking it 15th out of 175 journals in the category "Genetics & Heredity".
