= World Kidney Day =

Kidney focused global health awareness campaign

World Kidney Day (WKD) is a global health awareness campaign focusing on the importance of the kidneys and reducing the frequency and impact of kidney disease and its associated health problems worldwide.

World Kidney Day is observed annually on the 2nd Thursday in March. At the start of this holiday, 66 countries observed this date in 2006. Within two years, this number rose to 88. WKD is a joint initiative of the International Society of Nephrology (ISN) and the International Federation of Kidney Foundations (IFKF). This holiday was intended to raise awareness about conditions of the kidney; although many are treatable, they are a secondary medical concern of the greater population.
