= Kidney International =

- Discipline: Nephrology
- Language: English
- Edited by: Pierre Ronco

Publication details
- History: 1972-present
- Publisher: Elsevier on behalf of the International Society of Nephrology
- Frequency: Monthly
- Impact factor: 18.998 (2021)

Standard abbreviations
- ISO 4: Kidney Int.

Indexing
- CODEN: KDYIA5
- ISSN: 0085-2538 (print); 1523-1755 (web)
- LCCN: 76645051
- OCLC no.: 720451397

Links
- Journal homepage; Online access; Online archive; Journal page at publisher website; Journal page at society website

Kidney International is a monthly peer-reviewed medical journal covering all aspects of nephrology. It was established in 1972 and is published by Elsevier on behalf of the International Society of Nephrology, of which it is the official journal.

== Abstracting and indexing ==
The journal is abstracted and indexed in:

- Biological Abstracts
- BIOSIS Previews
- Chemical Abstracts Service
- CINAHL
- Current Contents/Clinical Medicine
- Current Contents/Life Sciences
- Elsevier BIOBASE
- EMBASE
- Global Health
- Index Medicus/MEDLINE/PubMed
- PASCAL
- Science Citation Index Expanded

According to the Journal Citation Reports, the journal has a 2021 impact factor of 18.998.
