= European Renal Association =

Nephrology association in Europe

European Renal Association (ERA)
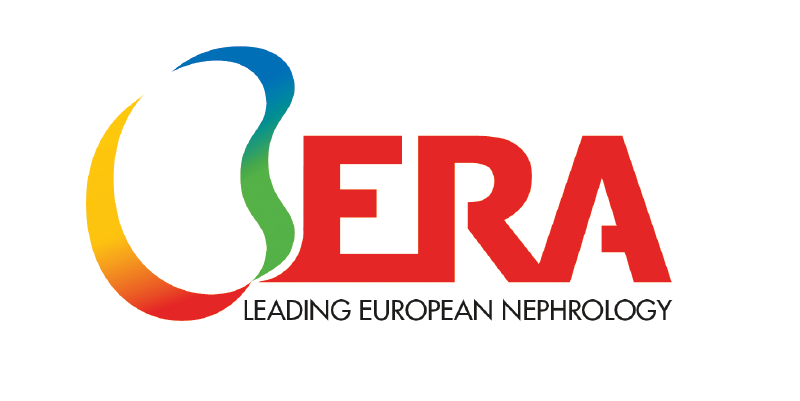
- Founded: 1963
- Type: Medical charity
- Purpose: Nephrology, basic and clinical research clinical nephrology, dialysis, and renal transplantation, kidney care
- Region served: Worldwide
- Members: over 28,000
- Key people: Roser Torra, President
- Website: www.era-online.org

The European Renal Association (ERA) is one of the biggest nephrology associations worldwide, with more than 28,000 members.

ERA aims to reduce the burden of chronic kidney disease by supporting basic and clinical research in the fields of clinical nephrology, dialysis, and renal transplantation. The Association organises annual congresses, e-seminars and continuing medical education (CME) courses, and supports fellowships.

== History ==
The early history of ERA began in 1963 when nephrologists Stanley Shaldon, William Drukker and David Kerr predicted that the future of nephrology would require more activity in the technical aspects of treating humans, rather than just academic interest and animal research.

Since the founding of the West European Dialysis Association' (WEDA) in 1963, the ERA has aimed to continually adapt its activities to maintain its role as a leading organisation in the European nephrology community.

In 1981, with the evolution of clinical nephrology and with the idea of including all the specialties linked to nephrology that were growing rapidly, the society changed its name from European Dialysis Transplantation Association (EDTA) to European Dialysis Transplantation Association-European Renal Association (EDTA-ERA). The 1983 congress was the first time that abstracts related to clinical nephrology exceeded those dealing with dialysis. Later that year, the EDTA officially acknowledged nephrology as one of its key missions and changed its name to reflect this. The EDTA-ERA became the European Renal Association–European Dialysis Transplantation Association (ERA-EDTA). The Association's then president, Vittorio Andreucci, played a prominent role in this change.

In 2021, with President Christoph Wanner, the Association changed its name and ERA-EDTA became ERA.

== Journals and congress ==
ERA publishes two journals: Nephrology Dialysis Transplantation: an international basic science and clinical renal journal (NDT) and Clinical Kidney Journal: Clinical and Translational Nephrology (CKJ, open access).

Since its founding, ERA has organised an annual Congress, with the Proceedings as its first scientific publication. This first was held in Amsterdam in 1964. For the Society’s first 22 years, the Proceedings included all lectures of the scientific programme presented during the meeting itself. Year by year the Congress became very successful, with more participants and a much richer scientific programme.

== ERA Registry ==
ERA started the ERA Registry in 1964 that collects data on kidney replacement therapy via the national and regional renal registries in Europe and in countries bordering Europe or the Mediterranean Sea. It analyses these data and distributes the results through registry reports presented at the yearly ERA congresses, publications in nephrology journals and through the ERA website.

The ERA Registry aims to complement and build on the analyses the national and regional kidney replacement therapy (KRT) registries carry out. The ERA Registry compares disease patterns and their treatment in member countries, studies treatment outcomes, carries out analyses where patient numbers in individual national and regional KRT registries are small, and builds up a demographic picture of KRT within the member countries. In addition, the ERA Registry performs focused studies using data from a segment of the catchment population to answer specific questions.
