= International Society of Nephrology =

Professional kidney health organization

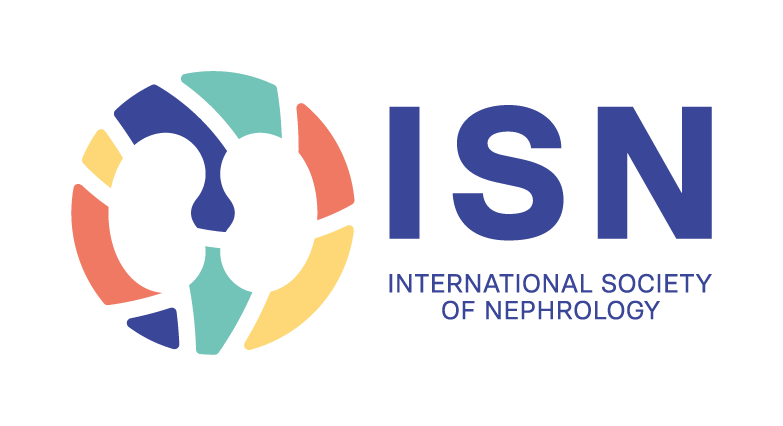
- Founded: 1960
- Type: Medical
- Purpose: Nephrology, kidney disease, global health, education
- Location(s): New Jersey, USA and Brussels, Belgium
- Region served: Worldwide
- Members: 9,000
- Website: theisn.org

The International Society of Nephrology (ISN) is an organization concerned with kidney health, founded in 1960.

In 1992 the society formed a task force to provide emergency kidney dialysis services in areas struck by disasters (usually earthquakes), where numerous victims may develop acute kidney injury due to crush syndrome. Supported by Médecins Sans Frontières, industry sponsors and professional associations, the Renal Disaster Relief Task Force sends renal nurses, technicians and doctors to the affected area. Since its establishment, it has assisted in a number of major earthquakes in several countries.

== Current leadership ==
ISN Officers, Executive Committee members, and Councillors are volunteers from ISN membership who lead the society and oversee its activities. The ISN President-Elect and Council are volunteers elected to their positions by ISN members.

The current leadership of the ISN includes Marcello Tonelli (President), Masaomi Nangaku (Past-President), Liz Lightstone (President-Elect) and Charu Malik (Executive Director)

== Research and publications ==
The society publishes three medical journals: Kidney International, Kidney International Supplements, and Kidney International Reports.
