= National Kidney Foundation =

United States–based nonprofit organization

- Abbreviation: NKF
- Formation: 1950
- Founders: Ada DeBold, Harry DeBold
- Type: Nonprofit organization
- Legal status: 501(c)(3) nonprofit organization
- Headquarters: New York, New York, U.S.
- Region served: United States
- Website: www.kidney.org

The National Kidney Foundation (NKF) is a United States–based nonprofit organization dedicated to the prevention, early detection, and treatment of kidney disease. Founded in 1950, NKF is a long-standing kidney health organization in the United States. The Foundation supports research, patient education, clinical practice guidelines, and public policy initiatives related to kidney health, dialysis, and transplantation. NKF works with patients, healthcare professionals, researchers, and policymakers to improve kidney care and address disparities in access to diagnosis, treatment, and transplantation.

NKF has local offices and affiliates across the United States.

== History ==
=== Early years (1950s–1960s) ===
The organization was founded in 1950 by Ada and Harry DeBold in Westchester, New York. The DeBolds’ son had kidney disease (nephrotic syndrome) and died from the illness. They founded the Committee for Nephrosis Research, initially focused on kidney disease research.

In 1964, the organization was renamed the National Kidney Foundation to reflect an expanded mission that included public education, advocacy, and awareness.

NKF contributed to the passage of the Uniform Anatomical Gift Act in 1968 and distributed kidney donor cards to promote organ donation awareness.

=== Expanding access and awareness (1970s) ===
During the 1970s, NKF participated in national efforts to expand access to dialysis and transplantation.

In 1972, changes to U.S. Medicare law extended coverage for dialysis and kidney transplantation to individuals with kidney failure regardless of age, making the United States the first country to provide broad coverage for end-stage renal disease.

NKF also launched professional councils in 1973 for dialysis and transplantation, nephrology social workers, and renal dietitians, later expanding to additional disciplines.

=== Research, ethics, and transplant policy (1980s) ===
In 1981, NKF published the first issue of the American Journal of Kidney Diseases, its official peer-reviewed journal.

During this decade, NKF advocated for ethical transplantation and policy reform, contributing to the passage of the National Organ Transplant Act in 1984, which prohibited the sale of human organs. The organization also supported federal funding for kidney research.

=== Quality improvement and community engagement (1990s) ===
In 1990, NKF organized the inaugural U.S. Transplant Games, an athletic event for transplant recipients, living donors, and supporters.

In 1992, NKF convened the first annual Spring Clinical Meetings, a national conference for nephrology professionals.

In 1995, NKF launched the Kidney Disease Outcomes Quality Initiative (KDOQI), which produced standardized clinical practice guidelines for chronic kidney disease (CKD). These guidelines introduced staging systems and are used in clinical practice.

In 1997, NKF launched the Kidney Early Evaluation Program (KEEP), a screening initiative to detect kidney disease at earlier stages.

NKF supported passage of the Organ Donor Leave Act (Public Law 106–56), providing paid leave for federal employees who serve as living organ donors.

=== Equity, innovation, and patient-centered care (2000s–2020s) ===
In the 2000s and 2010s, NKF expanded its focus on patient-centered programs, professional education, and disease detection initiatives.

In 2002, NKF created Kidney Disease: Improving Global Outcomes (KDIGO) to develop and promote clinical guidelines internationally.

In 2006, NKF supported congressional funding for the Chronic Kidney Disease Initiative at the Centers for Disease Control and Prevention.

In 2011, NKF launched the PEERs program, a mentoring initiative for patients, donors, and care partners.

In 2016, NKF launched CKDintercept, a program designed to improve early detection of kidney disease in primary care settings.

In 2017, NKF launched The Big Ask, The Big Give, an educational initiative promoting living kidney donation.

In 2019, NKF supported policy efforts related to the Advancing American Kidney Health initiative, which aimed to improve kidney care and increase access to transplantation.

In 2021, NKF, in collaboration with the American Society of Nephrology, supported adoption of a race-free estimated glomerular filtration rate (eGFR) calculation.

Between 2018 and 2023, multiple U.S. states enacted versions of the Living Donor Protection Act, addressing insurance and employment protections for living donors.

In 2023, Congress passed the Securing the U.S. Organ Procurement and Transplantation Network Act to strengthen oversight of the transplant system.

In 2025, NKF marked its 75th anniversary.

== Programs and initiatives ==
=== Patient support and education ===
NKF provides patient education and support services addressing chronic kidney disease, dialysis, transplantation, nutrition, and living donation.

Programs include:

- NKF Cares (patient helpline)
- NKF Peers (peer mentoring)
- Online patient communities
- Kidney Learning Center
- Patient Journey tools
- KidneyCARE Study (patient registry)
- Kidney Cars, a vehicle donation program that supports NKF programs.
- Kidney Walk, a series of community-based fundraising and awareness events held in multiple U.S. cities.
- NKF Golf Classic, a fundraising event series that supports kidney disease programs and services.

=== Professional education ===
NKF supports healthcare professionals through continuing education, clinical resources, conferences, and fellowship programs.

The NKF Spring Clinical Meetings provide continuing education and research updates for nephrology professionals.

=== Advocacy and public policy ===
Voices for Kidney Health is NKF's national advocacy program consisting of kidney advocates across the U.S. dedicated to improving kidney disease, dialysis, and transplant policy.
