= List of members of the National Academy of Medicine =

Following is a list of elected members of the American National Academy of Medicine.

== Members ==
=== 1970 ===
- Paul Bruce Beeson (d.)
- Ivan Loveridge Bennett (d.)
- Julius H. Comroe Jr. (d.)
- Jerome W. Conn (d.)
- Rashi Fein (d.)
- Robert J. Glaser (d.)
- Robert A. Good (d.)
- Leon O. Jacobson (d.)
- Henry Kunkel (d.)
- Lucile Petry Leone (d.)
- Irving London (d.)
- Colin Munro MacLeod (d.)
- Maclyn McCarty (d.)
- Walsh McDermott (d.)
- Carl V. Moore (d.)
- Samuel M. Nabrit (d.)
- Irvine Page (d.)
- Henry Riecken (d.)
- Walter A. Rosenblith (d.)
- Eugene A. Stead (d.)
- Thomas Huckle Weller (d.)
- Dwight Locke Wilbur (d.)
- Bryan Williams (d.)
- Adam Yarmolinsky (d.)
- Alonzo Smythe Yerby (d.)

=== 1971 ===
- William G. Anlyan (d.)
- Allan C. Barnes (d.)
- Jeremiah A. Barondess
- Alexander Gordon Bearn (d.)
- Robert W. Berliner (d.)
- Bernard Beryl Brodie (d.)
- John Harland Bryant (d.)
- John J. Burns (d.)
- E. Langdon Burwell (d.)
- Robert A. Chase (d.)
- Martin Cherkasky (d.)
- Morris F. Collen (d.)
- Robert E. Cooke (d.)
- Jerome R. Cox, Jr. (d.)
- William Henry Danforth (d.)
- Kurt W. Deuschle (d.)
- James F. Dickson (d.)
- Vincent Dole (d.)
- Avedis Donabedian (d.)
- F. William Dowda (d.)
- Robert H. Ebert (d.)
- Lloyd C. Elam (d.)
- Joseph T. English
- Martin Feldstein (d.)
- A. Alan Fischer (d.)
- Loretta Ford (d.)
- Donald S. Fredrickson (d.)
- Paul A. Freund (d.)
- Victor R. Fuchs (d.)
- Merwyn Greenlick (d.)
- David Hamburg (d.)
- Howard Hiatt (d.)
- John R. Hogness (d.)
- Peter Barton Hutt
- Alvin Ingram (d.)
- Clifford H. Keene (d.)
- Donald Kennedy (d.)
- Anne K. Kibrick (d.)
- Herbert E. Klarman (d.)
- Louis Lasagna (d.)
- Joshua Lederberg (d.)
- Philip R. Lee (d.)
- Irving J. Lewis (d.)
- Roslyn Lindheim (d.)
- Ruth Lubic
- Salvador Luria (d.)
- Robert Wellesley Mann (d.)
- Walter J. McNerney (d.)
- David Mechanic
- George H. Mills (d.)
- Alvin Morris (d.)
- Milnor B. Morrison (d.)
- Frederick Mosteller (d.)
- Marshall Warren Nirenberg (d.)
- George Pake (d.)
- Gerard Piel (d.)
- Chester Middlebrook Pierce (d.)
- Hermann Rahn (d.)
- Charles H. Rammelkamp (d.)
- Julius B. Richmond (d.)
- David E. Rogers (d.)
- Kenneth J. Ryan (d.)
- David Sabiston (d.)
- Rozella M. Schlotfeldt (d.)
- William B. Schwartz (d.)
- Nevin S. Scrimshaw (d.)
- Henry Silver (d.)
- William A. Spencer (d.)
- Lewis Thomas (d.)
- John B. Turner (d.)
- Joseph F. Volker (d.)
- James V. Warren (d.)
- Richard S. Wilbur
- George D. Zuidema (d.)

=== 1972 ===
- Kathleen G. Andreoli
- William O. Baker (d.)
- Thomas E. Bryant (d.)
- Ewald W. Busse (d.)
- Daniel Callahan (d.)
- Carleton B. Chapman (d.)
- Luther Christman (d.)
- Price M. Cobbs (d.)
- Wilbur J. Cohen (d.)
- John A. D. Cooper (d.)
- Emilio Q. Daddario (d.)
- Rheba de Tornyay (d.)
- Paul M. Densen (d.)
- Clifton O. Dummett (d.)
- Effie Ellis (d.)
- Alain Enthoven
- E. Harvey Estes
- Henry W. Foster (d.)
- Eliot Freidson (d.)
- Eli Ginzberg (d.)
- Bernard G. Greenberg
- Robert J. Haggerty (d.)
- Charles R. Halpern
- James G. Haughton (d.)
- Edward W. Hawthorne (d.)
- George J. Hayes (d.)
- H. Carl Haywood (d.)
- Nathan Hershey (d.)
- Robert Heyssel (d.)
- John L. Holloman Jr. (d.)
- Henry S. Kaplan (d.)
- C. Henry Kempe (d.)
- John W. Kirklin (d.)
- George I. Lythcott (d.)
- Paul A. Marks (d.)
- W. Walter Menninger
- Morton D. Miller (d.)
- James V. Neel (d.)
- Quigg Newton (d.)
- Edmund Pellegrino (d.)
- Paul Ramsey (d.)
- James B. Reswick (d.)
- Dorothy P. Rice (d.)
- Richard A. Smith (d.)
- Mitchell W. Spellman (d.)
- Daniel C. Tosteson (d.)
- Harold Wise (d.)

=== 1973 ===
- Philip Abelson (d.)
- Robert A. Alberty (d.)
- Odin W. Anderson (d.)
- Willis W. Armistead (d.)
- Myrtle Aydelotte (d.)
- Edgar T. Beddingfield (d.)
- Harvey Brooks (d.)
- Lewis H. Butler
- Seymour S. Cohen (d.)
- Robert Coles
- James F. Crow (d.)
- Herb Denenberg (d.)
- Carl Djerassi (d.)
- Albert Dorfman (d.)
- Merlin K. DuVal (d.)
- Adrian L. Edwards (d.)
- Leon Eisenberg (d.)
- John R. Evans (d.)
- Elsie A. Giorgi (d.)
- Carl W. Gottschalk (d.)
- James L. Grobe (d.)
- Michael J. Halberstam (d.)
- James W. Haviland (d.)
- M. Alfred Haynes (d.)
- Seymour S. Kety (d.)
- Eleanor C. Lambertsen (d.)
- LaSalle D. Leffall Jr. (d.)
- Charles E. Lewis (d.)
- Margaret E. Mahoney (d.)
- Marion Mann (d.)
- Robert Q. Marston (d.)
- Robert K. Merton (d.)
- Mildred Mitchell-Bateman (d.)
- J. Warren Perry (d.)
- Robert G. Petersdorf (d.)
- James G. Price (d.)
- Helen Ranney (d.)
- Frederick Chapman Robbins (d.)
- Doris E. Roberts (d.)
- William R. Roy (d.)
- Lisbeth B. Schorr
- Charles Schultze (d.)
- Eleanor Bernert Sheldon (d.)
- Cecil G. Sheps (d.)
- Lloyd H. Smith (d.)
- Anne R. Somers (d.)
- Nathan J. Stark (d.)
- Rosemary A. Stevens
- Andrew L. Thomas (d.)
- Paul D. Ward (d.)
- Malcolm S. Watts (d.)
- Kerr L. White (d.)
- J. Jerome Wildgen (d.)
- James Wyngaarden (d.)
- Asa G. Yancey Sr. (d.)

=== 1974 ===
- Kenneth Arrow (d.)
- W. Gerald Austen
- Robert M. Ball (d.)
- Abraham Clifford Barger (d.)
- Paul Berg
- Eugene Braunwald
- William D. Carey (d.)
- Thomas C. Chalmers
- Jewel Plummer Cobb (d.)
- Anna Bailey Coles (d.)
- Theodore Cooper (d.)
- David K. Detweiler (d.)
- James D. Ebert (d.)
- Herman Eisen (d.)
- Paul M. Ellwood Jr.
- Daniel X. Freedman (d.)
- John R. Gamble (d.)
- Maureen M. Henderson (d.)
- Arthur E. Hess (d.)
- James G. Hirsch (d.)
- Nicholas Hobbs (d.)
- Kurt Julius Isselbacher (d.)
- Jean E. Johnson
- James F. Kelly (d.)
- David M. Kipnis (d.)
- Albert L. Lehninger (d.)
- Cyrus Levinthal (d.)
- Abraham Lilienfeld (d.)
- Robert C. Long (d.)
- Clement Markert (d.)
- Gordon McLachlan (d.)
- J. Alexander McMahon (d.)
- Sherman M. Mellinkoff (d.)
- Matthew Meselson
- Arno Motulsky (d.)
- Selma J. Mushkin (d.)
- Russell A. Nelson (d.)
- Lloyd J. Old (d.)
- George Emil Palade (d.)
- Arthur Pardee (d.)
- Edward B. Perrin
- Daniel W. Pettengill (d.)
- Theodore Puck (d.)
- Frederick Redlich (d.)
- Milton I. Roemer (d.)
- Donald Seldin (d.)
- Sam Shapiro (d.)
- Robert L. Sinsheimer (d.)
- S. Marsh Tenney (d.)
- P. Roy Vagelos
- L. Emmerson Ward (d.)
- Charles DeWitt Watts (d.)
- Carroll Williams (d.)
- Marjorie P. Wilson (d.)
- Geraldine Pittman Woods (d.)
- Paul Zamecnik (d.)

=== 1975 ===
- Faye Glenn Abdellah (d.)
- Lewis M. Branscomb
- Lester Breslow (d.)
- Neal S. Bricker (d.)
- Noah R. Calhoun (d.)
- Florence S. Cromwell (d.)
- Leonard W. Cronkhite (d.)
- Martin M. Cummings (d.)
- Carl Eisdorfer
- Ronald W. Estabrook (d.)
- Saul J. Farber (d.)
- Renée Fox (d.)
- Richard Garwin
- Genevieve T. Hill (d.)
- Julius R. Krevans (d.)
- Sol Levine (d.)
- Gardner Lindzey (d.)
- Eleanor Maccoby (d.)
- Patricia A. McAtee (d.)
- Alton Meister (d.)
- Lincoln E. Moses (d.)
- Vernon Benjamin Mountcastle (d.)
- Franklin David Murphy (d.)
- Robert F. Murray
- Alan R. Nelson
- William Richard Scott
- Iris R. Shannon
- Tom Shires (d.)
- Jeanne Sinkford
- David H. Solomon (d.)
- Jonathan M. Spivak
- Robert S. Strauss
- Jack L. Strominger
- Louis Wade Sullivan
- August G. Swanson (d.)
- Hans-Lukas Teuber (d.)
- C. Gordon Watson (d.)

=== 1977 ===
- Robert J. Blendon
- Roger J. Bulger
- George E. Burket (d.)
- Robert A. Burt (d.)
- John A. Clausen (d.)
- Karen Davis
- Jack Elinson (d.)
- Alvan Feinstein (d.)
- William Campbell Felch (d.)
- Eugene A. Hildreth (d.)
- John K. Iglehart
- Jay Katz (d.)
- Samuel L. Kountz (d.)
- Boris Magasanik (d.)
- Audrey F. Manley
- Jack D. Myers (d.)
- Nora K. Piore (d.)
- Lee Robins (d.)
- Richard S. Ross (d.)
- Charles A. Sanders
- John F. Sherman (d.)
- Burton Weisbrod
- Jack E. White (d.)
- T. Franklin Williams (d.)

=== 1978 ===
- Daniel L. Azarnoff
- David L. Bazelon (d.)
- Lonnie R. Bristow
- John W. Bussman (d.)
- Barton Childs (d.)
- Rita K. Chow
- Leighton E. Cluff (d.)
- Ralph Crawshaw (d.)
- Robert Derzon (d.)
- John Thomas Dunlop (d.)
- Neil J. Elgee
- Edwin C. Evans (d.)
- Jacob J. Feldman
- William R. Felts (d.)
- Charles D. Flagle (d.)
- Ruth S. Hanft (d.)
- Donald Henderson (d.)
- Robert L. Hill (d.)
- James P. Hughes (d.)
- Carmault B. Jackson, Jr. (d.)
- Frederick S. Jaffe (d.)
- Sidney Katz (d.)
- Gerald Klerman (d.)
- Ben Lawton (d.)
- Alexander Leaf (d.)
- Edithe J. Levit (d.)
- Virgil Loeb (d.)
- Richard A. Merrill (d.)
- Robert H. Moser (d.)
- Joseph Newhouse
- Gerald T. Perkoff (d.)
- Arnold S. Relman (d.)
- Gerald D. Rosenthal
- Irving Selikoff (d.)
- Barbara Starfield (d.)
- David Talmage (d.)
- Carl E. Taylor (d.)
- Robert L. Van Citters
- Kenneth S. Warren (d.)
- Ruby L. Wilson
- Alejandro Zaffaroni (d.)

=== 1979 ===
- Joel J. Alpert (d.)
- Stuart Altman
- Richard C. Atkinson
- Leona Baumgartner (d.)
- Robert M. Berne (d.)
- Stuart Bondurant (d.)
- Orville Gilbert Brim Jr. (d.)
- Robert Neil Butler (d.)
- W. Maxwell Cowan (d.)
- Andrew D. Dixon (d.)
- Harriet P. Dustan (d.)
- John W. Farquhar (d.)
- William Foege
- Christopher C. Fordham (d.)
- Fred I. Gilbert (d.)
- Jere E. Goyan (d.)
- Ruth T. Gross (d.)
- Laurie M. Gunter (d.)
- Samuel Guze (d.)
- Beatrix Hamburg (d.)
- Jean L. Harris (d.)
- Ada K. Jacox
- William J. Kinnard Jr.
- Robert S. Lawrence
- Jack H. Medalie (d.)
- Gil Omenn
- David Rall (d.)
- Uwe Reinhardt (d.)
- Matilda White Riley (d.)
- Lewis Hastings Sarett (d.)
- J. Edwin Seegmiller (d.)
- Maxine Singer
- Reidar Fauske Sognnaes (d.)
- Charles C. Sprague (d.)
- Samuel O. Thier
- Alvin J. Thompson (d.)
- Arthur C. Upton (d.)
- James A. Vohs
- I. Bernard Weinstein (d.)

=== 1980 ===
- Herbert L. Abrams (d.)
- John E. Affeldt (d.)
- Julius Axelrod (d.)
- John C. Beck (d.)
- Sune Bergström (d.)
- Jan E. Blanpain
- Elkan Blout (d.)
- H. Keith H. Brodie (d.)
- Carmine D. Clemente
- Richard H. Egdahl (d.)
- Claire M. Fagin (d.)
- Howard S. Frazier (d.)
- Emil Frei (d.)
- John C. Greene (d.)
- Clifford Grobstein (d.)
- John A. Gronvall (d.)
- Harold Hillenbrand (d.)
- Michael M. Karl (d.)
- Michael Katz
- John K. Kittredge (d.)
- Gerhard Levy (d.)
- Kenneth L. Melmon (d.)
- Howard Newman (d.)
- Don K. Price (d.)
- Curtis Prout (d.)
- Mitchell T. Rabkin
- Paul Grant Rogers (d.)
- Anne A. Scitovsky (d.)
- Belding Hibbard Scribner (d.)
- Ethel Shanas (d.)
- Henry R. Shinefield
- Donald C. Shreffler (d.)
- Albert J. Solnit (d.)
- Judith P. Swazey
- Herman A. Tyroler (d.)
- Frank E. Young (d.)

=== 1981 ===
- Linda Aiken
- Samuel P. Asper (d.)
- Jack Barchas
- William Bevan (d.)
- Mark S. Blumberg
- Kenneth Brinkhous (d.)
- Alexander M. Capron
- David R. Challoner
- Thomas W. Clarkson
- Linda Hawes Clever
- James A. Clifton (d.)
- D. Walter Cohen (d.)
- Ernest G. Cravalho
- Edgar G. Davis (d.)
- Floyd W. Denny (d.)
- Daniel Federman (d.)
- Maurice Sanford Fox
- Charles Fried
- Harold Ginsberg (d.)
- J. Thomas Grayston
- Marie-Louise T. Johnson
- Stanley B. Jones (d.)
- Albert R. Jonsen
- Barbara M. Korsch (d.)
- Richard M. Krause (d.)
- Robert I. Levy (d.)
- Leah M. Lowenstein (d.)
- Ida M. Martinson
- Charles A. McCallum
- Thomas C. Merigan
- C. Arden Miller (d.)
- John S. Millis (d.)
- Norton Nelson (d.)
- Charles Odegaard (d.)
- Richard J. Reitemeier (d.)
- Clayton Rich (d.)
- William C. Richardson
- Barbara G. Rosenkrantz (d.)
- Edward Rubenstein (d.)
- Robert F. Rushmer (d.)
- Jay P. Sanford (d.)
- Thomas Schelling (d.)
- Aaron Shirley (d.)
- Robert B. Talley (d.)
- Alvin R. Tarlov
- Joseph V. Terenzio (d.)
- Irwin M. Weinstein (d.)

=== 1982 ===
- Mary Ellen Avery (d.)
- Albert L. Babb (d.)
- Baruj Benacerraf (d.)
- Floyd E. Bloom
- Baruch Samuel Blumberg (d.)
- Edward Brandt Jr. (d.)
- Robert H. Brook
- Eric J. Cassell
- John D. Chase (d.)
- Shirley Chater
- Lowell T. Coggeshall (d.)
- H. Douglas Collins (d.)
- Pedro Cuatrecasas
- Worth B. Daniels (d.)
- Michael DeBakey (d.)
- Roman W. DeSanctis
- Donnell D. Etzwiler (d.)
- Alfred P. Fishman (d.)
- Margaret J. Giannini
- Joseph Goldstein (d.)
- David S. Greer (d.)
- E. Cuyler Hammond (d.)
- Barbara C. Hansen
- George T. Harrell (d.)
- Clark C. Havighurst
- Ruby Puryear Hearn
- Joseph L. Henry (d.)
- S. Richardson Hill Jr. (d.)
- William N. Hubbard (d.)
- Richard Janeway
- Wolfgang Joklik
- Mary Ellen Jones (d.)
- Samuel L. Katz
- Charles R. Kleeman
- Norman Kretchmer (d.)
- Thomas W. Langfitt (d.)
- Joyce C. Lashof
- Barbara Joyce McNeil
- Thomas W. Moloney
- John H. Moxley
- Bernard W. Nelson
- Bernice Neugarten (d.)
- Daniel A. Okun (d.)
- Thomas K. Oliver Jr. (d.)
- Seymour Perry (d.)
- Frank A. Riddick (d.)
- Judith Rodin
- John Romano (d.)
- Saul A. Rosenberg
- James H. Sammons (d.)
- Doris R. Schwartz (d.)
- George A. Silver (d.)
- Frank A. Sloan
- Reuel A. Stallones (d.)
- Paul D. Stolley (d.)
- Raymond P. White
- Maurice Wood (d.)

=== 1983 ===
- Lawrence K. Altman
- Ralph L. Andreano
- H. David Banta
- Ben D. Barker
- Karl D. Bays (d.)
- Richard E. Behrman
- Henrik H. Bendixen (d.)
- Lionel M. Bernstein
- Robert L. Black
- R. Don Blim
- Kenneth E. Boulding (d.)
- James A. Campbell (d.)
- David S. Citron (d.)
- John J. Conger (d.)
- William C. Dement
- Donna Diers (d.)
- Isidore S. Edelman (d.)
- George L. Engel (d.)
- Carroll L. Estes
- Richard G. Farmer
- Harvey V. Fineberg
- William D. Fullerton (d.)
- Alfred Gellhorn (d.)
- Paul Goldhaber (d.)
- Avram Goldstein (d.)
- Morris Green (d.)
- Joseph Hamburg (d.)
- Margaret C. Heagarty
- Robert W. Jamplis (d.)
- Ruth L. Kirschstein (d.)
- Arthur Kleinman
- Carl Kupfer (d.)
- Lester B. Lave (d.)
- Philip Leder
- Thomas E. Malone (d.)
- Donald N. Medearis (d.)
- Neal E. Miller (d.)
- Duncan vB. Neuhauser
- Dominick P. Purpura (d.)
- Leon E. Rosenberg
- David D. Rutstein (d.)
- Jonas Salk (d.)
- Steven A. Schroeder
- William Silen
- Eliot Stellar (d.)
- George H. Taber (d.)
- Robert E. Tranquada
- Ralph O. Wallerstein (d.)
- Lewis W. Wannamaker (d.)
- Virginia V. Weldon
- M. Donald Whorton (d.)
- Linda S. Wilson
- Michael Zubkoff

=== 1984 ===
- Ronald M. Andersen
- Howard L. Bailit (d.)
- James W. Bawden (d.)
- Steven C. Beering
- Allan Beigel (d.)
- George Benedek
- J. Robert Buchanan
- William B. Carey
- Purnell W. Choppin
- Peter B. Dews (d.)
- Rhetaugh Graves Dumas (d.)
- Mitzi L. Duxbury
- David M. Eddy
- Charles C. Edwards (d.)
- Edward Evarts (d.)
- Charles J. Fahey
- Howard E. Freeman (d.)
- Tibor J. Greenwalt (d.)
- Jerome H. Grossman (d.)
- Melvin M. Grumbach (d.)
- Curtis G. Hames (d.)
- Robert Hofstadter (d.)
- Edward W. Hook (d.)
- Lyle Jones (d.)
- Robert Katzman (d.)
- Stuart Kornfeld
- Paul Eston Lacy (d.)
- Claude Lenfant
- Lawrence S. Lewin (d.)
- Ceylon S. Lewis (d.)
- Hugh McDevitt
- James A. Pittman Jr. (d.)
- Moshe Prywes (d.)
- Malcom Randall (d.)
- Charles E. Rosenberg
- Louise B. Russell
- Bruce J. Sams
- Robert Schimke (d.)
- John R. Seal (d.)
- Margretta Styles (d.)
- Sheldon M. Wolff (d.)

=== 1985 ===
- S. James Adelstein
- D. Bernard Amos (d.)
- David Axelrod (d.)
- Kathryn Barnard (d.)
- Stanley Baum
- Roscoe Brady (d.)
- Gert H. Brieger
- Vincent T. DeVita
- John W. Eckstein (d.)
- Stefan S. Fajans (d.)
- Frank Falkner (d.)
- Bernard Fisher
- Willard Gaylin (d.)
- John P. Geyman
- Frederick K. Goodwin
- Jerome Gross (d.)
- Thomas F. Hornbein
- Robert B. Jaffe
- William N. Kelley
- Richard J. Kitz (d.)
- Donald A.B. Lindberg
- Harald Loe (d.)
- Harold S. Luft
- James O. Mason
- W. Eugene Mayberry (d.)
- Beverlee A. Myers (d.)
- Elena O. Nightingale
- Fred Plum (d.)
- George G. Reader (d.)
- Janet Rowley (d.)
- Frank Ruddle (d.)
- Walter O. Spitzer (d.)
- Joseph W. St. Geme (d.)
- Bruce C. Vladeck

=== 1986 ===
- Henry J. Aaron
- Frederick C. Battaglia
- J. Claude Bennett
- Richard A. Berman
- Norman Breslow (d.)
- Ralph L. Brinster
- William E. Bunney
- Thomas B. Clarkson (d.)
- Robert B. Copeland
- Ramzi Cotran (d.)
- Milo Gibaldi (d.)
- Leon Gordis (d.)
- Paul Griner
- Walter Guralnick (d.)
- Richard J. Johns
- Edward H. Kass (d.)
- Edward Kravitz
- Saul Krugman (d.)
- Elaine L. Larson
- Alicia Munnell
- June E. Osborn
- Michael E. Phelps
- John T. Potts Jr.
- Paul G. Quie
- Charles C. Richardson
- Robert G. Shulman (d.)
- Robert D. Sparks (d.)
- Edward J. Stemmler
- William H. Sweet (d.)
- S. Leonard Syme
- Henry N. Wagner (d.)
- Charles F. Westoff
- Samuel S.C. Yen (d.)

=== 1987 ===
- Henry L. Barnett (d.)
- Marshall H. Becker (d.)
- Leslie Z. Benet
- Michael Stuart Brown
- Doris Calloway (d.)
- John W. Colloton
- Minor J. Coon (d.)
- Joseph M. Davie
- Howard A. Eder (d.)
- Anthony S. Fauci
- Suzanne W. Fletcher
- Joseph L. Goldstein
- Richard W. Hanson (d.)
- Birt Harvey
- Bernadine Healy (d.)
- Samuel Hellman
- King K. Holmes
- Donald Hopkins
- Richard T. Johnson (d.)
- Jerome Kagan
- Morton Kramer (d.)
- Philip J. Landrigan
- Gerald D. Laubach
- Paul C. MacDonald (d.)
- Adel Mahmoud (d.)
- Alexander Margulis
- Manuel Martinez Maldonado
- Howard E. Morgan (d.)
- Adrian M. Ostfeld (d.)
- Mark V. Pauly
- Charles E. Putman (d.)
- Alan S. Rabson (d.)
- Steven Rosenberg
- Roger A. Rosenblatt (d.)
- Russell Ross (d.)
- Arthur H. Rubenstein
- Abraham M. Rudolph
- David Sartorelli (d.)
- David Satcher
- Edward H. Shortliffe
- Margaret D. Sovie (d.)
- Michel Ter-Pogossian (d.)
- Samuel A. Wells
- Ioannis V. Yannas
- Edward Zigler (d.)

=== 1988 ===
- Francois M. Abboud
- Brian Abel-Smith (d.)
- David Baltimore
- Paul B. Batalden
- Edwin L. Bierman (d.)
- Barry Bloom
- L. Thompson Bowles
- Leo K. Bustad (d.)
- M. Paul Capp
- Charles C.J. Carpenter
- Mario M. Chaves
- Donald J. Cohen (d.)
- Stanley Norman Cohen
- Linda C. Cork
- Barbara J. Culliton
- John R. David
- Richard Doll (d.)
- Paul Ebert (d.)
- John M. Eisenberg (d.)
- Bernard N. Fields (d.)
- Delbert A. Fisher
- Paul S. Frame
- Robert J. Genco (d.)
- Enoch Gordis
- Emil C. Gotschlich
- David G. Hoel
- Philip Holzman (d.)
- Barbara S. Hulka
- Lewis Judd (d.)
- Eric Kandel
- Charles Kiesler (d.)
- Sheldon S. King
- Luella Klein
- Casimir A. Kulikowski
- Norma M. Lang
- Joseph Larner (d.)
- Aaron B. Lerner (d.)
- Bernard Lown
- Adetokunbo Lucas
- Philip Majerus (d.)
- Amelia Mangay-Maglacas
- Joseph B. Martin
- Ian McWhinney (d.)
- Sten Orrenius
- Frank Oski (d.)
- Michael I. Posner
- Jonathan E. Rhoads (d.)
- Michael Rutter
- Rudi Schmid (d.)
- Benno C. Schmidt Sr. (d.)
- Robert William Schrier
- Kenneth I. Shine
- Stephen M. Shortell
- David B. Skinner (d.)
- Solomon H. Snyder
- Albert J. Stunkard (d.)
- Homer R. Warner (d.)
- Noel S. Weiss

=== 1989 ===
- Albert Bandura
- G. Octo Barnett
- Solomon R. Benatar
- Eula Bingham
- Els Borst (d.)
- Gerard N. Burrow (d.)
- C. Thomas Caskey
- Evan Charney
- C. Robert Cloninger
- Harvey R. Colten (d.)
- Jack M. Colwill
- Rosemary Donley
- Laurence E. Earley (d.)
- Robert M. Epstein
- Myron E. Essex
- Harold J. Fallon (d.)
- Daniel W. Foster (d.)
- Robert Gallo
- Alfred G. Gilman (d.)
- Harlyn O. Halvorson (d.)
- Richard J. Havel (d.)
- Betty Hay (d.)
- Ada Sue Hinshaw
- Stephen C. Joseph
- Robert J. Joynt (d.)
- C. Everett Koop (d.)
- David Korn
- David E. Kuhl (d.)
- Robert S. Langer
- Gwilym S Lodwick (d.)
- Ruth Macklin
- Halfdan T. Mahler (d.)
- Vincent T. Marchesi
- Edward A. Mortimer (d.)
- David G. Nathan
- David E. Poswillo (d.)
- John W. Rowe
- Harold Tafler Shapiro
- Eric Manvers Shooter (d.)
- Thomas A. Stamey (d.)
- John D. Stobo
- Neal A. Vanselow (d.)
- Christopher T. Walsh
- Gail L. Warden
- Milton Weinstein
- Jack Wennberg
- Gail Wilensky
- Warren Winkelstein (d.)
- Theodore Woodward (d.)
- George Zografi

=== 1990 ===
- Albert Aguayo
- Jorge Allende
- Thomas P. Almy (d.)
- Dorothy Bainton
- Samuel H. Barondes
- James Blumstein
- Byron W. Brown Jr. (d.)
- Thomas F. Budinger
- William T. Butler (d.)
- Paul Calabresi (d.)
- Joseph A. Califano Jr.
- Michael I. Cohen
- Max Dale Cooper
- Joseph T. Coyle
- Haile Debas
- Jane F. Desforges (d.)
- Joseph W. Eschbach (d.)
- Gerald Fischbach
- Juanita W. Fleming
- Judah Folkman (d.)
- Charles K. Francis
- Uta Francke
- Irving H. Goldberg
- DeWitt S. Goodman (d.)
- Robert Graham
- Jack Wennberg
- Gerald N. Grob (d.)
- Michael Grossman
- Thomas S. Inui
- Stephen Jacobsen (d.)
- Egon Jonsson
- Morris J. Karnovsky (d.)
- David Kupfer
- Robert Langridge
- Judith R. Lave
- Walter F. Leavell
- David M. Livingston
- Robert Marshak
- Roger O. McClellan
- Ruth McCorkle
- John D. Michenfelder (d.)
- Mortimer Mishkin
- Wataru Mori (d.)
- Herbert L. Needleman
- Robert E. Patricelli
- William E. Paul (d.)
- Keith Peters
- Roy M. Pitkin
- Ross Prentice
- Evert Reerink
- Alexander Rich (d.)
- William L. Roper
- Murray B. Sachs (d.)
- Simone Sandier
- Charles R. Schuster (d.)
- James E. Strain
- Howard Martin Temin (d.)
- Bailus Walker
- Peter A. Ward
- Joseph B. Warshaw (d.)

=== 1991 ===
- Bernard W. Agranoff
- Myron Allukian
- Harold Amos (d.)
- K. Frank Austen
- John R. Ball
- C. Wayne Bardin
- Elizabeth Barrett-Connor
- John A. Benson
- J. Michael Bishop
- Richard Bonnie
- Dorothy Brooten
- Larry R. Churchill
- Francis Collins
- Edward J. Connors (d.)
- Patricia M. Danzon
- Ezra C. Davidson (d.)
- Carolyne K. Davis (d.)
- Don E. Detmer
- Patricia K. Donahoe
- John A. Downey
- Gertrude B. Elion (d.)
- Philip J. Fialkow (d.)
- Yuan-Cheng Fung
- Bernard D. Goldstein
- G. Anthony Gorry (d.)
- Antonio Gotto
- Larry A. Green
- William R. Hazzard
- Edgar B. Jackson
- Jerome P. Kassirer
- John A. Kirkpatrick (d.)
- Barbara J. Lowery (d.)
- Myron S. Magen (d.)
- Jonathan M. Mann (d.)
- Guy M. McKhann
- Louis H. Miller
- Elizabeth F. Neufeld
- Peter Nowell (d.)
- Charles P. O'Brien
- Suzanne Oparil
- Charles E. Phelps
- Jens J Pindborg (d.)
- Samuel H. Preston
- Fred S. Rosen (d.)
- Allan Rosenfield (d.)
- Gerold L. Schiebler
- Lucy Shapiro
- Phillip Allen Sharp
- Guillermo Soberon
- Mildred T. Stahlman (d.)
- Thoralf M. Sundt (d.)
- Jan van Bemmel
- Harold E. Varmus
- David Weatherall (d.)
- Savio L-Y Woo

=== 1992 ===
- Nancy C. Andreasen
- Robert Austrian (d.)
- Clyde F. Barker
- Marilyn Bergner (d.)
- Kenneth I. Berns
- Jo Ivey Boufford
- Ronald N. Bracewell (d.)
- William R. Brody
- Charles C. Capen (d.)
- Robert M. Carey
- Christine K. Cassel
- Britton Chance (d.)
- Allan MacLeod Cormack (d.)
- Caswell A. Evans
- Daniel M. Fox
- Joseph F. Fraumeni Jr.
- Kristine Gebbie
- Mitchell S. Golbus
- M. R. C. Greenwood
- Brian E. Henderson (d.)
- Kurt Hirschhorn
- William Hsiao
- John P. Kampine (d.)
- Stephen I. Katz (d.)
- Haig H. Kazazian, Jr.
- Patricia A. King
- Seymour J. Klebanoff (d.)
- Claude B. Klee (d.)
- Franklin M. Loew (d.)
- George D. Lundberg
- George M. Martin
- Paul R. McHugh
- Paul Meier (d.)
- Ralph L. Nachman
- Robert M. Nerem
- James G. Nuckolls
- Dennis S. O'Leary
- Stuart Orkin
- Herbert Pardes
- Jerome B. Posner
- Darwin Prockop
- Stanley B. Prusiner
- Marcus Raichle
- David Rimoin (d.)
- Phillips Robbins
- Sheila A. Ryan
- Ruth Sager (d.)
- Jane G. Schaller
- Joseph E. Scherger
- Lawrence Shepp (d.)
- Clement B. Sledge
- Ralph Snyderman
- Alfred Sommer
- Morton N. Swartz (d.)
- Walter J. Wadlington
- Thomas A. Waldmann
- Laurence R. Young
- Nicholas T. Zervas

=== 1993 ===
- Drew E. Altman
- Marcia Angell
- Arthur K. Asbury
- John Christian Bailar (d.)
- Robert L. Barchi
- David Botstein
- Marjorie A. Bowman
- Samuel Broder
- Benjamin S. Bunney
- James P. Comer
- EJ Corey
- James W. Curran
- Thomas F. Deuel
- Jack E. Dixon
- Sue K. Donaldson
- Baruch Fischhoff
- Kathleen M. Foley
- Julio Frenk
- H. Jack Geiger
- Irma Gigli
- Florence Pat Haseltine
- Jules Hirsch (d.)
- Rochelle Hirschhorn
- Michael M. E. Johns
- David A. Kessler
- Henk Lamberts (d.)
- David M. Lawrence
- Norman G. Levinsky (d.)
- Stephen J. Lippard
- Albert Macovski
- Theodore R. Marmor
- Luigi Mastroianni (d.)
- Kathleen A. McCormick
- Victor A. McKusick (d.)
- Francis Daniels Moore (d.)
- Fitzhugh Mullan
- Philip Needleman
- Dorothy Nelkin (d.)
- Bert W. O'Malley
- Cecil B. Pickett
- William S. Pierce
- Mary Lake Polan
- Judith L. Rapoport
- John B. Robbins
- Peter Rosen
- Stuart F. Schlossman
- Susan C. Scrimshaw
- Sheldon Segal (d.)
- Larry J. Shapiro
- Harold C. Sox
- William N. Spellacy (d.)
- Glenn D. Steele
- Donald M. Steinwachs
- Reed V. Tuckson
- Paul C. Weiler
- Meir Wilchek
- Donald E. Wilson
- Nancy F. Woods
- Vernon R. Young (d.)

=== 1994 ===
- Nancy Adler
- Dyanne D. Affonso
- Huda Akil
- Bobby R. Alford (d.)
- Stephen J. Benkovic
- Paul C. Brucker (d.)
- Patricia Happ Buffler (d.)
- Ann Burgess
- Anthony Cerami
- Iain Chalmers
- Yu-Mei Y. Chao
- Shu Chien
- Paul D. Cleary
- Jordan J. Cohen
- Molly J. Coye
- Gordon H. DeFriese
- Mickey S. Eisenberg
- Amitai Etzioni
- Ruth Faden
- Thomas B. Fitzpatrick (d.)
- Elaine Fuchs
- Patricia Goldman-Rakic (d.)
- Ann Graybiel
- William J. Hadlow (d.)
- Margaret Hamburg
- Peter M. Howley
- Dean Jamison
- Michael Kaback
- Janet C. King
- Mary-Claire King
- Peter O. Kohler
- Robert Lefkowitz
- David E. Longnecker
- Clement J. McDonald
- James J. Mongan (d.)
- Joseph Murray (d.)
- Hans Neurath (d.)
- Jane S. Norbeck
- Paul A. Nutting
- John A. Oates
- Kenneth Olden
- Michael Peckham
- Theodore L. Phillips
- Malcolm C. Pike
- Irwin H. Rosenberg
- Allen D. Roses (d.)
- F. Sherwood Rowland
- Richard L. Simmons
- Joe L. Simpson
- Jerome F. Strauss
- Takashi Sugimura
- Richard W. Tsien
- Ming T. Tsuang
- Stanley Watson
- Alice S. Whittemore
- Jean D. Wilson
- Gerald N. Wogan
- Flossie Wong-Staal
- Tachi Yamada
- Anne B. Young

=== 1995 ===
- Cairns Aitken (d.)
- Ruzena Bajcsy
- William G. Baxt
- Arthur Beaudet
- Helen Blau
- Dan Blazer
- Murray Brennan
- Howard Brody
- Lynn P. Carmichael (d.)
- Gail H. Cassell
- Dudley S. Childress (d.)
- David A. Clayton
- Antonio Damasio
- Jacqueline E. Darroch
- Janice Douglas
- R. Gordon Douglas Jr.
- Felton Earls
- Charles J. Epstein (d.)
- Ralph Feigin (d.)
- Jonathan Fielding
- Spencer Foreman (d.)
- Irwin Freedberg (d.)
- Sid Gilman
- Robert M. Glickman
- Lee Goldman
- Lazar J. Greenfield Sr.
- John S. Greenspan
- Scott M. Grundy
- Bernard Guyer
- Arthur L. Herbst
- Maurice Hilleman (d.)
- Jimmie C. Holland (d.)
- Sandral Hullett
- Richard Hynes
- Richard B. Johnston Jr.
- Ferenc A. Jolesz (d.)
- William B. Kerr
- Ernst Knobil (d.)
- Arnold J. Levine
- Myron M. Levine
- James S. Lieberman (d.)
- Iris F. Litt
- Willard G. Manning (d.)
- Angela Barron McBride
- Jane Menken
- Mary O. Mundinger
- Donald L. Patrick
- Vivian Pinn
- Mamphela Ramphele
- Mark C. Rogers
- Mark L. Rosenberg
- Linda Rosenstock
- James Rothman
- Stephen J. Ryan (d.)
- Harold C. Slavkin
- Carolyn Slayman (d.)
- Daniel Steinberg (d.)
- Judith S. Stern
- Shirley M. Tilghman
- Roger Y. Tsien (d.)
- Emil R. Unanue
- Edward E. Wallach
- Patrick C. Walsh
- Dorothea Zucker-Franklin (d.)

=== 1996 ===
- Clay Armstrong
- John P. Atkinson
- Marion J. Ball
- Alfred O. Berg
- Merton Bernfield (d.)
- Robert L. Brent
- Claire V. Broome
- Arvid Carlsson (d.)
- Mark R. Chassin
- Paul D. Clayton
- K. Danner Clouser (d.)
- Barbara de Lateur
- Allen J. Dietrich
- Gerald Fink
- Frank Furstenberg
- Mitchell H. Gail
- John I. Gallin
- John W. Gardner (d.)
- Marilyn Gaston
- James R. Gavin
- Robert L. Goldenberg
- Lewis R. Goldfrank
- Sheldon Greenfield
- Rodrigo V. Guerrero
- Edgar Haber (d.)
- Charlene A. Harrington
- Brigid Hogan
- Jocelyne Kane-Berman
- Robert P. Kelch
- David A. Kindig
- Richard Klausner
- Herbert Kleber (d.)
- William J. Koopman
- Kiyoshi Kurokawa
- Bernard Lo
- Joanne Lynn
- Henri R. Manasse
- Bettie Sue Siler Masters
- Mario J. Molina
- H. Richard Nesson (d.)
- Michael B. A. Oldstone
- John Olney (d.)
- Scott S. Parker
- Shmuel Penchas
- Dale Purves
- Nancy K. Reame
- David Sachs
- Marla E. Salmon
- Peter T. Scardino
- Edward Scolnick
- George F. Sheldon (d.)
- Thomas Shenk
- Samuel C. Silverstein
- Mervyn Susser (d.)
- Steven R. Tannenbaum
- Susan S. Taylor
- Gerald E. Thomson
- Judith Vaitukaitis
- Andrew G. Wallace
- John E. Ware Jr.
- Kenneth E. Warner
- Stephen Waxman
- Myron L. Weisfeldt
- Myrna Weissman
- Torsten Wiesel

=== 1997 ===
- Ron J. Anderson (d.)
- George J. Annas
- Barbara F. Atkinson
- Eugene A. Bauer
- Aaron T. Beck (d.)
- Regina Benjamin
- Donald Berwick
- Dennis M. Bier
- Mina Bissell
- Enriqueta C. Bond
- William H. Bowen (d.)
- Allan M. Brandt
- Jan Breslow
- Bruce G. Buchanan
- Harry P. Cain
- Cho Zang-hee
- Mary Sue Coleman
- Colleen Conway-Welch
- Mark R. Cullen
- Peter Dervan
- Thomas S. Edgington
- C. McCollister Evarts
- Stanley Falkow (d.)
- Manning Feinleib
- Howard L. Fields
- Richard G. Frank
- Harold P. Freeman
- Robert J. Gorlin (d.)
- Kevin Grumbach
- Zach W. Hall
- Barton Haynes
- David Ho
- Ralph I. Horwitz
- David E. Housman
- Suzanne T. Ildstad
- Tadamitsu Kishimoto
- Richard M. Knapp
- Risa Lavizzo-Mourey
- Howard Leventhal
- Charles Marsden (d.)
- Marie McCormick
- William W. McGuire
- John Mendelsohn (d.)
- I. George Miller
- Linda B. Miller
- John Monahan
- Peter J. Morris
- Jennifer R. Niebyl
- Stephen G. Pauker
- Steven M. Paul
- Philip A. Pizzo
- Jeffrey L. Platt
- Vinod K. Sahney
- Jonathan Samet
- Bengt I. Samuelsson
- Leonard D. Schaeffer
- Gloria R. Smith (d.)
- Helen L. Smits
- Louis Sokoloff (d.)
- Judith Swain
- Judith E. Tintinalli
- Joseph Volpe
- A. Eugene Washington
- Ralph Weichselbaum
- Bryce Weir
- Kenneth B. Wells
- Michael J. Welsh
- Nancy Wexler
- James T. Willerson
- Robert Wurtz

=== 1998 ===
- Lu Ann Aday
- N. Scott Adzick
- Dennis A. Ausiello
- Graeme I. Bell
- Edward J. Benz Jr.
- David Blumenthal
- J. Lyle Bootman
- Henry Brem
- William T. Carpenter
- David C. Carter
- Willard Cates Jr. (d.)
- James Childress
- Larry Culpepper
- Thomas Detre (d.)
- William H. Dietz
- Michael V. Drake
- Johanna T. Dwyer
- Victor Dzau
- Steven Gabbe
- Alan Garber
- Cutberto Garza
- Helene D. Gayle
- Barbara A. Gilchrest
- Laurie Glimcher
- Morton F. Goldberg
- Robert C. Griggs
- George C. Hill
- Martha N. Hill
- Ronald C. Kessler
- Eric Lander
- Rudolph Leibel
- Alan I. Leshner
- Stephen Ludwig
- Bruce McEwen
- James A. Merchant
- Ronald D. Miller
- Van C. Mow
- Van C. Murad
- Woodrow A. Myers
- Elizabeth Nabel
- Gary Nabel
- Carl F. Nathan
- Eva Neer (d.)
- Eric J. Nestler
- Maria New
- John W. Owen
- Joseph S. Pagano
- William A. Peck
- Anne C. Petersen
- Donald L. Price
- E. Albert Reece
- Peter G. Schultz
- Seymour I. Schwartz
- B. A. Schwetz
- Goran C. Sedvall
- Sally Shaywitz
- Zena Stein
- Thomas P. Stossel
- Kunihiko Suzuki
- Carol Tamminga
- Palmer W. Taylor
- John Vane (d.)
- Diane W. Wara
- Walter Willett
- Ernst-Ludwig Winnacker
- Catherine Woteki

=== 1999 ===
- Eli Y. Adashi
- Roy M. Anderson
- Ba Denian
- John G. Bartlett
- Douwe Breimer
- William R. Brinkley
- Kathleen C. Buckwalter
- Kevin Campbell
- Cyril Chantler
- Barry S. Coller
- Norman Daniels
- Sarah S. Donaldson
- Kenneth H. Fischbeck
- Paul M. Fischer
- Ellen Frank
- Michael A. Gimbrone Jr.
- David Ginsburg
- Patricia A. Grady
- Robert A. Greenes
- Paul Greengard (d.)
- Ed Harlow
- Stephen L. Hauser
- Richard J. Hodes
- Julian T. Hoff (d.)
- Edward W. Holmes
- Nancy Hopkins
- James S. House
- Betsy Humphreys
- Loretta Sweet Jemmott
- C. Ronald Kahn
- Arthur Kellermann
- Kenneth Kendler
- David W. Kennedy
- Sung Wan Kim
- Kenneth Kizer
- Jeffrey P. Koplan
- Robert Ledley (d.)
- Ting-Kai Li
- Nicole Lurie
- Michael Marletta
- Martha McClintock
- W. Ian McDonald (d.)
- J. Michael McGinnis
- F. A. Murphy
- Margaret E. O'Kane
- Thomas D. Pollard
- Pasko Rakic
- Robert Reischauer
- Lewis Rowland (d.)
- Alan L. Schwartz
- Christine Seidman
- Carla J. Shatz
- Michael L. Shelanski
- Jack P. Shonkoff
- Kurt C. Stange
- Thomas Starzl (d.)
- Ian G. Stiell
- Inder Verma
- Paul Volberding
- Daniel Weinberger
- Michael J. Welch (d.)
- Kern Wildenthal
- Catherine M. Wilfert
- Douglas W. Wilmore
- Mary Woolley
- Richard Zeckhauser

=== 2000 ===
- George Aghajanian
- Paul S. Appelbaum
- Joan K. Austin
- Lisa Berkman
- Elizabeth Blackburn
- Gunter Blobel (d.)
- Clara D. Bloomfield
- Lawrence D. Brown
- Jacquelyn Campbell
- Nancy Cantor
- William A. Catterall
- Thomas Cech
- Jean-Pierre Changeux
- Dennis S. Charney
- Dennis Choi
- Noreen M. Clark (d.)
- Thomas J. Coates
- Hoosen Coovadia
- Catherine D. DeAngelis
- Arnold Epstein
- Dennis G. Fryback
- Valentín Fuster
- Bruce J. Gantz
- Shimon Glick
- Larry Gostin
- Deborah Greenspan
- Jerome Groopman
- Charles B. Hammond
- Jerris R. Hedges
- Jane E. Henney
- Eve Higginbotham
- Margaret K. Hostetter
- Steven Hyman
- Lisa Iezzoni
- Sherman James
- Thomas J. Kelly
- Peter S. Kim
- John Kitzhaber
- William A. Knaus
- Mary Anne Koda-Kimble
- David J. Lipman
- Jerold F. Lucey (d.)
- Gerald L. Mandell
- Donald R. Mattison
- Richard Mayeux
- Elizabeth R. McAnarney
- Thomas G. McGuire
- Edward D. Miller
- Antonia Novello
- Seiji Ogawa
- Jerrold M. Olefsky
- John A. Parrish
- Denis Pereira Gray
- Charles S. Peskin
- Peter Piot
- Deborah E. Powell
- Howard K. Rabinowitz
- Paul G. Ramsey
- David D. Sabatini
- Donna Shalala
- Frank E. Speizer
- Larry Squire
- William W. Stead
- James C. Thompson (d.)
- Wylie Vale (d.)
- Nora Volkow
- Robert Weinberg
- William Julius Wilson
- Elias Zerhouni
- Huda Zoghbi

=== 2001 ===
- George Alleyne
- Nancy L. Ascher
- Stephen W. Barthold
- Bobbie Berkowitz
- Thomas F. Boat
- Mark Boguski
- Patricia Flatley Brennan
- Baruch Brody (d.)
- Robert H. Brown
- Joan Brugge
- Margaret A. Chesney
- Philip J. Cook
- David R. Cox (d.)
- David Cutler
- Kenneth L. Davis
- Guy B. de The (d.)
- Marian Wright Edelman
- Robert A. Fishman (d.)
- Linda P. Fried
- Henry Friesen
- Fred Gage
- Norman F. Gant
- Robert D. Gibbons
- Bradford H. Gray
- Fernando A. Guerra
- Raquel E. Gur
- Stephen Heinemann (d.)
- Ralph F. Hirschmann (d.)
- Danny O. Jacobs
- Mae Jemison
- Renee R. Jenkins
- Thomas Jessell (d.)
- George A. Kaplan
- Dennis L. Kasper
- Janice Kiecolt-Glaser
- Elliott D. Kieff
- Rudolf E. Klein
- Jeffrey Leiden
- M. Cristina Leske
- Allen S. Lichter
- Jeffrey Lieberman
- Robert W. Mahley
- Daniel R. Masys
- Edward P. McCabe
- Alexa T. McCray
- Douglas A. Melton
- Beverly S. Mitchell
- John Newsom-Davis (d.)
- William Nyhan (d.)
- Eric N. Olson
- Edward E. Penhoet
- Eliseo J. Pérez-Stable
- Gregory Petsko
- Bernard Roizman
- Cornelius Rosse
- Bennett A. Shaywitz
- Jane E. Sisk
- Mark D. Smith
- Brian L. Strom
- Leslie Ungerleider
- Joseph P. Vacanti
- Bert Vogelstein
- Robert B. Wallace
- Bob Waterston
- Stephen J. Weiss
- Blaine C. White
- David R. Williams
- Charles B. Wilson (d.)
- Steven H. Woolf
- Warren Zapol

=== 2002 ===
- Abul K. Abbas
- Harvey J. Alter
- Michele Barry
- Ronald Bayer
- Robert E. Black
- Paula A. Braveman
- Gordon L. Brownell (d.)
- Gro Harlem Brundtland
- Steven R. Cummings
- Nils Daulaire
- Luis A. Diaz
- Salvatore DiMauro
- Kathleen A. Dracup
- David Eisenberg
- William E. Evans
- Stanley Fahn
- Richard Feachem
- E. John Gallagher
- Linda C. Giudice
- Howard H. Goldman
- Caroline B. Hall (d.)
- Ira Herskowitz (d.)
- Bertil Hille
- Hedvig Hricak
- James M. Hughes
- Louis Ignarro
- James S. Jackson
- Harry R. Jacobson
- Robert L. Kahn
- Gerald T. Keusch
- Stanley J. Korsmeyer (d.)
- Stephen W. Lagakos (d.)
- Sheila T. Leatherman
- Richard P. Lifton
- Bruce Link
- James R. Lupski
- Malegapuru William Makgoba
- Spero M. Manson
- Michael Marmot
- Barry Marshall
- Reynaldo Martorell
- Karen A. Matthews
- Afaf Meleis
- Michael H. Merson
- Charles Nemeroff
- Arthur W. Nienhuis
- Deborah Prothrow-Stith
- James M. Roberts
- Gerald M. Rubin
- Erkki Ruoslahti
- Michael A. Savageau
- Thomas L. Schwenk
- Debra A. Schwinn
- Allen M. Spiegel
- George R. Stark
- Ralph M. Steinman (d.)
- Lawrence A. Tabak
- Nancy J. Tarbell
- Craig B. Thompson
- John Q. Trojanowski
- David Valle
- Sheldon Weinbaum
- Irving Weissman
- Zena Werb
- Jeanine P. Wiener-Kronish
- David A. Williams
- R. Sanders Williams
- Barbara L. Wolfe
- Kathryn Zoon
- Harald zur Hausen

=== 2003 ===
- James M. Anderson
- Ann Arvin
- James P. Bagian
- William G. Barsan
- Robert H. Bartlett
- John D. Baxter (d.)
- M. Flint Beal
- Henry R. Bourne
- Rebecca H. Buckley
- Peter Buerhaus
- Lincoln C.H. Chen
- Francis V. Chisari
- Lester Crawford
- Michael P. Doyle
- Jeffrey M. Drazen
- Brian Druker
- Andrew G. Engel
- John W. Erdman, Jr.
- Richard R. Ernst
- Ronald M. Evans
- Paul Farmer
- Judith Feder
- Jeffrey Flier
- Donald Ganem
- Lillian Gelberg
- Richard H. Gelberman
- Roger I. Glass
- Michael M. Gottesman
- Mark Groudine
- Richard L. Guerrant
- John Gurdon
- Ashley T. Haase
- Gail G. Harrison (d.)
- William L. Holzemer
- Leroy Hood
- H. Robert Horvitz
- Thomas R. Insel
- Rakesh Jain
- Timothy R. Johnson
- Cynthia Kenyon
- Helena Chmura Kraemer
- Shiriki Kumanyika
- Nicole Marthe Le Douarin
- Timothy J. Ley
- Douglas R. Lowy
- Mark McClellan
- Richard T. Miyamoto
- Paul L. Modrich
- Harold L. Moses
- Robin Murray
- Godfrey P. Oakley
- Jean W. Pape
- Margaret A. Pericak-Vance
- Neil R. Powe
- Arthur L. Reingold
- Jim E. Riviere
- Diane Rowland
- Jeffrey Sachs
- Ismail A. Sallam
- Hugh A. Sampson
- Leona D. Samson
- Alan Schatzberg
- Oliver Smithies (d.)
- Harrison C. Spencer (d.)
- Shelley E. Taylor
- Peter K. Vogt
- Jeffrey A. Whitsett
- M. Roy Wilson
- Owen Witte
- Keith Yamamoto

=== 2004 ===
- Oded Abramsky
- Paula Allen-Meares
- Frances Arnold
- Francine Benes
- Georges C. Benjamin
- Ruth L. Berkelman
- Ernest Beutler (d.)
- Joseph A. Buckwalter IV
- Sheila P. Burke
- Diana D. Cardenas
- Carolyn M. Clancy
- Fred E. Cohen
- Sheldon Cohen
- Shaun R. Coughlin
- Philip D. Darney
- Mark M. Davis
- Ciro de Quadros (d.)
- Alan DeCherney
- Mahlon DeLong
- Ronald A. DePinho
- Robert J. Desnick
- Timothy J. Eberlein
- Ezekiel Emanuel
- Andrew Fire
- James G. Fox
- Robert Freedman
- Apostolos Georgopoulos
- Julie Gerberding
- Peter Gluckman
- Diane Griffin
- John W. Griffin (d.)
- Jonathan H. Gruber
- Alan Edward Guttmacher
- David L. Heymann
- Helen Hobbs
- Stephen L. Hoffman
- Anthony R. Hunter
- Brent C. James
- Edward H. Kaplan
- Kenneth Kaushansky
- Jim Yong Kim
- Lonnie J. King
- Talmadge E. King
- Howard Koh
- Cato T. Laurencin
- Edward R. Laws
- John R. Lumpkin
- Peter R. MacLeish
- Robert Malenka
- Andrew Marks
- James S. Marks
- Ricardo Martinez
- Rowena Green Matthews
- John D. McConnell
- William C. Mobley
- Michael Mulholland
- Robert L. Nussbaum
- Michael Osterholm
- Nancy Padian
- Richard Peto
- Thomas C. Quinn
- K. Srinath Reddy
- Jaime Sepúlveda
- Charles J. Sherr
- Eric Topol
- Mary Wakefield
- Stephen T. Warren
- Arthur Weiss
- John B. West
- Dyann Wirth

=== 2005 ===
- Peter Agre
- Allan Basbaum
- David W. Bates
- John I. Bell
- Emilio Bizzi
- Troyen A. Brennan
- David A. Brent
- George W. Brown
- Kelly D. Brownell
- Dennis A. Carson
- Denis A. Cortese
- Pietro De Camilli
- Jared Diamond
- Mary K. Estes
- Alex S. Evers
- Donna M. Ferriero
- Mark Fishman
- Michael F. Fleming
- Stephen P. Fortmann
- Jeffrey M. Friedman
- Vanessa Northington Gamble
- Michael Gazzaniga
- Stanton Glantz
- Jesse L. Goodman
- Richard H. Goodman
- Warner C. Greene
- Margaret Grey
- Harold W. Jaffe
- J. Larry Jameson
- Marjorie K. Jeffcoat
- Barbara B. Kahn
- Larry R. Kaiser
- Robert M. Kaplan
- Francine Ratner Kaufman
- Gabor D. Kelen
- Richard D. Krugman
- Steven M. Larson
- Virginia M.-Y. Lee
- Ann C. Macaulay
- Floyd J. Malveaux
- Frank McCormick
- Elizabeth A. McGlynn
- Steven McKnight
- James O. McNamara
- Emmanuel Mignot
- Jeanne Miranda
- Pascoal Mocumbi
- Marilyn Moon
- Jonathan D. Moreno
- Jeffrey C. Murray
- David Naylor
- Mary D. Naylor
- Eric K. Noji
- Stanley Plotkin
- Carol Prives
- Fred Rivara
- Emanuel Rivers
- Alan R. Saltiel
- Paul Schimmel
- Joseph Schlessinger
- Dennis J. Selkoe
- Val C. Sheffield
- Gerald I. Shulman
- Burton H. Singer
- Virginia A. Stallings
- Joan A. Steitz
- Peter Szolovits
- Raymond L. White (d.)
- Leonard I. Zon

=== 2006 ===
- Nancy C. Andrews
- Suzanne Bakken
- Lance Becker
- Timothy Billiar
- John D. Birkmeyer
- Carol M. Black
- Robert W. Blum
- Michael Boehnke
- Dan W. Brock
- Linda B. Buck
- Alta Charo
- Nicholas A. Christakis
- Francisco G. Cigarroa
- Ellen Wright Clayton
- Graham Colditz
- Chi Van Dang
- Betty Diamond
- Elazer R. Edelman
- Stephen Elledge
- Elliott S. Fisher
- Richard A. Flavell
- Gary R. Fleisher
- Theodore G. Ganiats
- Kathleen Giacomini
- Sherry Glied
- Stephen P. Goff
- Marthe R. Gold
- Francisco Gonzalez-Scarano
- Sten Grillner
- David A. Grimes
- Maxine Hayes
- Susan Band Horwitz
- Rudolf Jaenisch
- Dilip V. Jeste
- Emmett B. Keeler
- Raynard S. Kington
- H. Clifford Lane
- Mitchell Lazar
- Susan Lindquist (d.)
- George Lister
- Joseph Loscalzo
- Martha L. Ludwig (d.)
- James D. Marks
- Robert L. Martuza
- Joan Massagué
- John C. Mazziotta
- Martin McKee
- Catherine G. McLaughlin
- Randolph A. Miller
- Anne Mills
- Arnold S. Milstein
- Ruth Sonntag Nussenzweig (d.)
- Baldomero Olivera
- Walter Orenstein
- Guy H. Palmer
- Leena Peltonen-Palotie (d.)
- Kenneth S. Polonsky
- Thomas H. Rice
- Jane S. Richardson
- John Rubenstein
- Paul A. Sieving
- Richard J. Smith
- G. Gayle Stephens (d.)
- William M. Tierney
- Ajit Varki
- Ellen Vitetta
- Judith Wasserheit
- Alastair J. Wood
- Scott L. Zeger
- Charles Zuker

=== 2007 ===
- James P. Allison
- Robert J. Alpern
- Richard A. Andersen
- David A. Asch
- Bruce J. Baum
- Ronald Brookmeyer
- Emery N. Brown
- Wylie Burke
- Frederick M. "Skip" Burkle Jr.
- Kathryn Calame
- Michael L. Callaham
- Webster Cavenee
- Aravinda Chakravarti
- Leighton Chan
- Zhu Chen
- Richard D. Clover (d.)
- Joel D. Cooper
- Kay Dickersin
- Nancy Wilson Dickey
- Andrew Paul Feinberg
- Lee A. Fleisher
- Patricia A. Ganz
- Arthur Garson
- Gary H. Gibbons
- Lynn Goldman
- Ellen R. Gritz
- Andrew Haines
- Victoria Hale
- Katherine A. High
- Alan H. Jobe
- William G. Kaelin
- Ann-Louise Kinmonth
- Darrell Kirch
- K. Ranga R. Krishnan
- Harlan Krumholz
- Eric B. Larson
- Theodore S. Lawrence
- Ronald Levy
- David A. Lewis
- Michael T. Longaker
- Susan E. Mackinnon
- Cynthia Mulrow
- Christopher J. L. Murray
- James M. Ostell
- Luis F. Parada
- Timothy A. Pedley
- Herbert B. Peterson
- Roderic I. Pettigrew
- John Edward Porter
- Louis Ptáček
- Amelie G. Ramirez
- Jeffrey V. Ravetch
- Roberto Romero
- David A. Savitz
- David T. Scadden
- Matthew P. Scott
- Jonathan Seidman
- Jonathan Skinner
- Peter St George-Hyslop
- Arnold W. Strauss
- Thomas C. Südhof
- B. Katherine Swartz
- Paul C. Tang
- Mary Tinetti
- Kamil Ugurbil
- Antonia M. Villarruel
- Edward H. Wagner
- Keith Wailoo
- Carolyn L. Westhoff

=== 2008 ===
- Lucile L. Adams-Campbell
- Kathryn Virginia Anderson
- Jeff Balser
- Jean Bennett
- Bruce Beutler
- Maureen Bisognano
- Thomas S. Bodenheimer
- Aaron Ciechanover
- Lisa Cooper
- Lawrence Corey
- George Davey Smith
- Patrick H. DeLeon
- Angela Diaz
- Harry C. Dietz
- Peter Doherty
- Kathryn M. Edwards
- Jonathan A. Epstein
- Jose Julio Escarce
- Maria Freire
- Walter R. Frontera
- Sanjiv Sam Gambhir
- Naomi L. Gerber
- Jeffrey I. Gordon
- David S. Guzick
- Douglas Hanahan
- James E. K. Hildreth
- David M. Holtzman
- Arthur L. Horwich
- Peter Hotez
- Elaine Jaffe
- Phyllis J. Kanki
- John Kappler
- Nancy Kass
- Gary A. Koretzky
- Arnold Kriegstein
- Raju S. Kucherlapati
- W. Marston Linehan
- Depei Liu
- Husseini K. Manji
- Howard Markel
- Philippa Marrack
- Helen S. Mayberg
- Anthony D. Mbewu
- Linda McCauley
- Juanita Merchant
- Michael Merzenich
- James W. Mold
- Marsha A. Moses
- Ralph W. Muller
- Milap C. Nahata
- John E. Niederhuber
- Olufunmilayo Olopade
- Joseph P. Ornato
- Peter R. Orszag
- David C. Page
- Nicholas A. Peppas
- David H. Perlmutter
- Etta D. Pisano
- Linda A. Randolph
- Barbara K. Rimer
- Louise M. Ryan
- Charles Sawyers
- Anne Schuchat
- J. Sanford Schwartz
- Terry Sejnowski
- Ira Shoulson
- Peter A. Singer
- William A. Vega
- Gary L. Westbrook
- Phyllis Wise

=== 2009 ===
- Russ Altman
- Kristi Anseth
- Karen Ashe
- Tom P. Aufderheide
- Michelle H. Biros
- Jeanne Brooks-Gunn
- Patrick O. Brown
- Donald Burke
- Martin Chalfie
- Setsuko K. Chambers
- Arul Chinnaiyan
- Michael L. Cleary
- Tom Curran
- Michael R. DeBaun
- Susan Dentzer
- Ana V. Diez Roux
- Wafaa El-Sadr
- Amy Finkelstein
- Garret A. FitzGerald
- Richard Frackowiak
- Thomas R. Frieden
- Alfred L. Goldberg
- Sue J. Goldie
- Dana P. Goldman
- Deborah G. Grady
- Lawrence W. Green
- Daniel A. Haber
- Michael R. Harrison
- Samuel Hawgood
- Robert B. Haynes
- Carol Pearl Herbert
- Eric C. Holland
- Mark S. Humayun
- Tyler Jacks
- Alexandra L. Joyner
- Frederick S. Kaplan
- Michael B. Kastan
- Ichiro Kawachi
- Isaac S. Kohane
- Uma R. Kotagal
- Story C. Landis
- Roger J. Lewis
- Jennifer Lippincott-Schwartz
- Alan D. Lopez
- Joanne R. Lupton
- Terry F. McElwain
- Roberta B. Ness
- Roger A. Nicoll
- Nancy H. Nielsen
- Michel C. Nussenzweig
- Daniel K. Podolsky
- Joan Y. Reede
- Maximilian F. Reiser
- Allan L. Reiss
- Mary V. Relling
- John A. Rich
- Griffin P. Rodgers
- Gary Ruvkun
- William M. Sage
- Clifford B. Saper
- Amita Sehgal
- Joe V. Selby
- Lawrence Steinman
- Barbara J. Stoll
- Megan Sykes
- Selwyn M. Vickers
- Bruce D. Walker
- Douglas C. Wallace
- Ralph Weissleder
- Susan M. Wolf

=== 2010 ===
- David M. Altshuler
- Hortensia de los Angeles Amaro
- Kenneth C. Anderson
- John Z. Ayanian
- Jeremy M. Berg
- Nancy Berliner
- Linda S. Birnbaum
- Sydney Brenner (d.)
- Benjamin S. Carson Sr.
- Michael E. Chernew
- George P. Chrousos
- Peter Cresswell
- Sue Curry
- Charles A. Czeisler
- Ralph G. Dacey Jr.
- Riccardo Dalla-Favera
- Robert B. Darnell
- Titia de Lange
- Frank V. deGruy III
- Karl Deisseroth
- Susan Desmond-Hellmann
- Raymond Dingledine
- Jennifer A. Doudna
- Deborah A. Driscoll
- Michael F. Drummond
- Richard L. Ehman
- Jack A. Elias
- Charis Eng (d.)
- Joseph J. Fins
- Elena Fuentes-Afflick
- Zvi Y. Fuks
- Terry T. Fulmer
- Stephen J. Galli
- Robert S. Galvin
- Bruce D. Gelb
- Gary L. Gottlieb
- Carol W. Greider
- Beatrice H. Hahn
- Qide Han
- Roger A. Johns
- Kevin B. Johnson
- Roger D. Kamm
- Terry P. Klassen
- John H. Krystal
- Nathan Kuppermann
- Michael D. Lairmore
- Caryn Lerman
- Charles J. Lockwood
- Chad A. Mirkin
- Suzanne P. Murphy
- J. Marc Overhage
- Ira Pastan
- Robert L. Phillips Jr.
- Peter J. Polverini
- Jill Quadagno
- Neil J. Risch
- Bruce Rosen
- David Rosner
- Kevan M. Shokat
- Diane M. Simeone
- David J. Skorton
- Joseph W. St. Geme III
- John R. Stanley
- Margaret G. Stineman
- Mary T. Story
- Jeremy Sugarman
- George E. Thibault
- Connie M. Weaver
- Thomas E. Wellems
- Carl Wu

=== 2011 ===
- Barbara Abrams
- Margarita Alegria
- Frederick W. Alt
- Karen H. Antman
- Anthony J. Atala
- Katherine Baicker
- Carolyn R. Bertozzi
- Martin J. Blaser
- W. Thomas Boyce
- Claire D. Brindis
- Bruce N. Calonge
- John Chae
- Frank A. Chervenak
- Vivian G. Cheung
- Patricia A. Conrad
- Carlo M. Croce
- George Q. Daley
- Nancy E. Davidson
- Mark E. Davis
- Joel DeLisa
- David L. Eaton
- Diana L. Farmer
- Claire M. Fraser
- Margaret T. Fuller
- Joe G. N. Garcia
- Atul Gawande
- George Georgiou
- Daniel H. Geschwind
- Richard A. Gibbs
- Jonathan D. Gitlin
- Glenda E. Gray
- Joe W. Gray
- Stephen W. Hargarten
- Tomas Hökfelt
- Richard Horton
- Jennifer L. Howse
- Richard L. Huganir
- Sharon K. Inouye
- Richard J. Jackson
- Timothy Jost
- Yuet Wai Kan
- Michael Karin
- Michael L. LeFevre
- Roderick J. A. Little
- Jay Loeffler
- JoAnn E. Manson
- Carol A. Mason
- Jeremy Nathans
- Paul A. Offit
- Ora H. Pescovitz
- Christine Petit
- Claire Pomeroy
- Peter J. Pronovost
- Daniel J. Rader
- David A. Relman
- David R. Rubinow
- David Serwadda
- James P. Smith
- Jeannette South-Paul
- Mriganka Sur
- Marc T. Tessier-Lavigne
- James H. Thrall
- David A. Tirrell
- Li-Huei Tsai
- Abraham C. Verghese
- Barbara Vickrey
- David Vlahov
- Mark E. von Zastrow
- Cun-Yu Wang
- James N. Weinstein

=== 2012 ===
- Salim Abdool Karim
- Gustavo D. Aguirre
- David B. Allison
- Norman B. Anderson
- Lawrence Appel
- Jacqueline K. Barton
- Robert D. Beauchamp
- Shelley L. Berger
- Bruce R. Blazar
- Michael L. Boninger
- Nancy M. Bonini
- David A. Brenner
- John M. Carethers
- Amitabh Chandra
- Lynda Chin
- Don W. Cleveland
- Myron S. Cohen
- James J. Collins
- David A. Compston
- PonJola Coney
- Eileen M. Crimmins
- Nigel Crisp
- Jian-Ping Dai
- Lisa DeAngelis
- John O. DeLancey
- Sherin U. Devaskar
- Vishva M. Dixit
- John P. Donoghue
- Robert H. Edwards
- Christopher J. Elias
- Michael Fiore
- Thomas R. Fleming
- Sandro Galea
- Jennifer Grandis
- Robert M. Groves
- Paul H. Grundy
- George Hripcsak
- Donald E. Ingber
- David Julius
- Carl H. June
- Daniel L. Kastner
- Lydia E. Kavraki
- Paula Lantz
- Albert Lee
- Tracy A. Lieu
- Dan R. Littman
- Jens Ludwig
- Terry Magnuson
- Tom Maniatis
- Diane McIntyre
- Antonios G. Mikos
- Lloyd B. Minor
- Albert G. Mulley
- Jack Needleman
- Peter Palese
- Martin A. Philbert
- Marina Picciotto
- Jennifer M. Puck
- Stephen R. Quake
- Marilyn Rantz
- Kerry J. Ressler
- Wayne J. Riley
- Martin Roland
- Sara Rosenbaum
- Arthur B. Sanders
- Andrew I. Schafer
- Mitchell D. Schnall
- Fritz H. Schroder
- Gregg L. Semenza
- Nelson K. Sewankambo
- Steven A. Siegelbaum
- David Spiegel
- Andy S. Stergachis
- David K. Stevenson
- Gerold Stucki
- Sten H. Vermund
- Kevin G. Volpp
- Diana J. Wilkie
- Wayne M. Yokoyama
- Charles F. Zorumski

=== 2013 ===
- Janis L. Abkowitz
- Frederick R. Appelbaum
- Katrina Armstrong
- Sabaratnam Arulkumaran
- Diana W. Bianchi
- Jeffrey Bluestone
- Charles L. Bosk
- Mary Bartlett Bunge
- Molly Cooke
- Delos M. Cosgrove III
- Patrick Couvreur
- Janet Currie
- Mary D'Alton
- Ara Darzi
- Carlos del Rio
- David L. DeMets
- Phyllis A. Dennery
- James R. Downing
- Jeffrey A. Drebin
- Gideon Dreyfuss
- Daiming Fan
- Eric R. Fearon
- Mark E. Frisse
- Judy E. Garber
- Ronald N. Germain
- Arline T. Geronimus
- Karen Glanz
- Joseph G. Gleeson
- Susan B. Hassmiller
- Mauricio Hernandez-Avila
- Jody Heymann
- Waun Ki Hong (d.)
- Brian Jack
- Clifford R. Jack Jr.
- Carlos R. Jaen
- Alan M. Jette
- Ashish Jha
- Gary S. Kaplan
- Evan D. Kharasch
- Richard D. Kolodner
- Sally Kornbluth
- Ann Kurth
- Nancy E. Lane
- Anne Laude
- Thomas A. LaVeist
- Quynh-Thu Le
- Brendan Lee
- Warren J. Leonard
- Pat R. Levitt
- Beverly Malone
- Eve Marder
- Jonna A. K. Mazet
- Ruslan Medzhitov
- Diane E. Meier
- Michelle Mello
- Bernadette Mazurek Melnyk
- David J. Mooney
- Louis J. Muglia
- Joan M. O'Brien
- Francis Omaswa
- Moshe Oren
- Daniel S. Pine
- Helen Piwnica-Worms
- Bruce M. Psaty
- Danny Reinberg
- J. Evan Sadler
- Yoel Sadovsky
- Peter Salovey
- Mark A. Schuster
- Nirav R. Shah
- George M. Shaw
- Xiaoming Shen
- Lisa Simpson
- Pamela Sklar (d.)
- Matthew W. State
- Georg Stingl
- Subra Suresh
- Christopher A. Walsh
- Elizabeth (Betsy) E. Weiner
- James Woolliscroft

=== 2014 ===
- Quarraisha Abdool Karim
- Goncalo Abecasis
- Rafi Ahmed
- Robert Aronowitz
- Ben Barres (d.)
- José Baselga
- Chris Beyrer
- Walter Boron
- Carol R. Bradford
- Jeffrey Brenner
- Nancy J. Brown
- Lewis C. Cantley
- Arturo Casadevall
- Elliot L. Chaikof
- E. Antonio Chiocca
- James J. Cimino
- Patrick H. Conway
- Pascale Cossart
- James E. Crowe Jr.
- Pamela B. Davis
- Linda C. Degutis
- Joseph M. DeSimone
- Jennifer E. DeVoe
- Daniel B. Drachman
- James S. Economou
- Eva Feldman
- A. Mark Fendrick
- Stephanie L. Ferguson
- Todd Golub
- Eric Goosby
- Mark A. Hall
- Margaret Heitkemper
- Christian J. Herold
- James O. Hill
- Bradley Hyman
- George J. Isham
- Julie A. Johnson
- Paula A. Johnson
- Gerald Joyce
- Gérard Karsenty
- Mitchell H. Katz
- Yang Ke
- Carol Keehan
- Sara Kenkare-Mitra
- Paul A. Khavari
- Mary E. Klotman
- Brian K. Kobilka
- Richard G. Kronick
- Christian P. Larsen
- Steven H. Lipstein
- Catherine Lord
- Guillermina Lozano
- Edward W. Merrill
- Kelle H. Moley
- Denis Mukwege
- Susan A. Murphy
- John J. O'Shea Jr.
- Harry T. Orr
- David Piwnica-Worms
- Kathleen Potempa
- Meredith Rosenthal
- Bryan L. Roth
- W. Mark Saltzman
- Randy W. Schekman
- Michael V. Sefton
- Martin-J. Sepulveda
- Michael N. Shadlen
- Joshua M. Sharfstein
- Margaret Shipp
- Bruce M. Spiegelman
- Deepak Srivastava
- Robyn Stone
- Joseph S. Takahashi
- Dan Theodorescu
- Irma Thesleff
- Sheila Tlou
- Ronald D. Vale
- Gordana Vunjak-Novakovic
- Charlotte Watts

=== 2015 ===
- E. Dale Abel
- Sudhir Anand
- Christopher P. Austin
- Howard Bauchner
- Kirsten Bibbins-Domingo
- Andrew B. Bindman
- Diane F. Birt
- Rena Bizios
- Otis Brawley
- Serdar Bulun
- Linda Burnes Bolton
- Atul Butte
- Joseph Buxbaum
- Mario Capecchi
- Jean-Laurent Casanova
- Glenn M. Chertow
- Kathleen R. Cho
- Benjamin K. Chu
- Sarah Cleaveland
- Josep Dalmau
- Sally C. Davies
- Tejal A. Desai
- Richard DiMarchi
- Dennis E. Discher
- Kenneth A. Dodge
- Ronald Duman
- James C. Eisenach
- Napoleone Ferrara
- Julie Ann Freischlag
- Amato J. Giaccia
- Melissa L. Gilliam
- D. Gary Gilliland
- Christopher K. Glass
- Fastone M. Goma
- Michael R. Green
- Murat Günel
- Robert A. Harrington
- Sean Hennessy
- Friedhelm Hildebrandt
- Frank Hu
- Anna Huttenlocher
- Frances E. Jensen
- Ned H. Kalin
- Beth Karlan
- Arthur Kaufman
- Kenneth W. Kinzler
- Keith P. Klugman
- Walter J. Koroshetz
- Vivian Lee
- Kung-Yee Liang
- Roberto Malinow
- Laurie K. McCauley
- David A. McCormick
- David O. Meltzer
- Joan W. Miller
- Vincent Mor
- James Morone
- Edvard I. Moser
- May-Britt Moser
- Vasant Narasimhan
- Robert W. Neumar
- Laura E. Niklason
- Elizabeth O. Ofili
- Nikola Pavletich
- Jonathan B. Perlin
- Kenneth Ramos
- Bonnie Ramsey
- Valerie F. Reyna
- Alexander Rudensky
- Richard H. Scheller
- Susan Skochelak
- Nahum Sonenberg
- Douglas Staiger
- Kevin Struhl
- Chorh Chuan Tan
- Marita G. Titler
- Richard L. Wahl
- Alan R. Weil
- John Whyte
- Shinya Yamanaka

=== 2016 ===
- Anissa Abi-Dargham
- Anita L. Allen
- María José Alonso
- Masayuki Amagai
- Cheryl A. M. Anderson
- Peter Bach
- Bonnie Bassler
- Andrew W. Bazemore
- Per-Olof Berggren
- Karen F. Berman
- Andrea L. Cheville
- Anne L. Coleman
- Kathleen L. Collins
- Roger D. Cone
- Martha A.Q. Curley
- Joseph DeRisi
- Francis J. Doyle III
- Karen M. Emmons
- Elissa S. Epel
- Timothy G. Evans
- Carol Friedman
- K. Christopher Garcia
- Patricia J. Garcia
- Carmen Garcia-Pena
- Martin Gaynor
- Maura L. Gillison
- Alison Goate
- Sarah J. Halton
- Paula T. Hammond
- Stanley L. Hazen
- Mukesh K. Jain
- Maria Jasin
- Prabhat Jha
- Jeffrey Kahn
- Melina Kibbe
- Allan Kirk
- Mark Krasnow
- Francis S. Lee
- T. Jake Liang
- Maureen Lichtveld
- George A. Macones
- Kelsey Martin
- Donald P. McDonnell
- Bruce L. Miller
- Samir Mitragotri
- Valerie Montgomery Rice
- John H. Morrison
- Mark A. Musen
- K.M. Venkat Narayan
- Kenneth Offit
- James Marc Perrin
- Bernice A. Pescosolido
- Thomas A. Rando
- Lynne D. Richardson
- James A. Roth
- Paul B. Rothman
- James F. Sallis
- Jane E. Salmon
- Aziz Sancar
- Tadatsugu Taniguchi
- Hugh S. Taylor
- Oyewale Tomori
- Craig Venter
- Cheryl Lyn Walker
- David R. Walt
- Huntington Willard
- Michelle Ann Williams
- Xiaoliang S. Xie
- Clyde Yancy
- Michael J. Yaszemski

=== 2017 ===
- Mark E. Anderson
- Scott A. Armstrong
- Amy Arnsten
- Cornelia Bargmann
- Mary T. Bassett
- Samuel Berkovic
- Christopher N. Bowman
- Elizabeth H. Bradley
- Robert Breiman
- Melinda B. Buntin
- Carrie L. Byington
- Neil Calman
- Xuetao Cao
- Anne Case
- Arup Chakraborty
- Howard Y. Chang
- Wendy W. Chapman
- Tina L. Cheng
- Marshall H. Chin
- Lewis A. Chodosh
- Christos Coutifaris
- Benjamin Cravatt III
- Alan D'Andrea
- Mark J. Daly
- Richard Davidson
- Joshua C. Denny
- Karen DeSalvo
- Sharon M. Donovan
- Mark R. Dybul
- Evan E. Eichler
- Serpil Erzurum
- Jeremy Farrar
- Alain Fischer
- Mona N. Fouad
- Gerard E. Francisco
- Rebekah Gee
- Christine Grady
- Rachel Green
- Michael E. Greenberg
- Felicia Hill-Briggs
- Chanita Hughes-Halbert
- Scott J. Hultgren
- Yasmin Hurd
- Nicholas P. Jewell
- V. Craig Jordan
- Eve A. Kerr
- George Koob
- Gabriel Krestin
- Paul P. Lee
- Allan I. Levey
- Charles M. Lieber
- Daniel H. Lowenstein
- Lynne E. Maquat
- Gerald Markowitz
- John R. Mascola
- Tirin Moore
- Robin P. Newhouse
- M. Kariuki Njenga
- Gbenga Ogedegbe
- Rebecca Onie
- Maria A. Oquendo
- Michael S. Parmacek
- Ramon E. Parsons
- Scott Pomeroy
- Martin G. Pomper
- Rita F. Redberg
- Lesley Regan
- Therese S. Richmond
- Dorothy Roberts
- John H. Sampson
- Robert F. Siliciano
- Leif I. Solberg
- Soumya Swaminathan
- Viviane Tabar
- Masayo Takahashi
- Suzanne L. Topalian
- Nicholas J. White
- Flaura K. Winston
- Donald M. Yealy

=== 2018 ===
- Hanan M. Al-Kuwari
- Bruce Aylward
- Françoise Barré-Sinoussi
- Linamara R. Battistella
- Yasmine Belkaid
- James M. Berger
- Richard E. Besser
- Zulfiqar Bhutta
- Richard S. Blumberg
- Azad Bonni
- Andrea Califano
- Michael A. Caligiuri
- Clifton W. Callaway
- Elias Campo
- Yang Chai
- Giselle Corbie-Smith
- Peter Daszak
- Michael S. Diamond
- Susan M. Domchek
- Francesca Dominici
- Benjamin L. Ebert
- Robert L. Ferrer
- Jennifer Elisseeff
- Robert M. Friedlander
- Ying-Hui Fu
- William A. Gahl
- Joshua A. Gordon
- Scott Gottlieb
- David A. Hafler
- Evelynn M. Hammonds
- David N. Herndon
- Steven M. Holland
- Amy J. Houtrow
- Jeffrey Hubbell
- John Ioannidis
- Robert E. Kingston
- Ophir Klein
- Alex H. Krist
- John Kuriyan
- Joy Lawn
- Ellen Leibenluft
- Gabriel Leung
- Linda M. Liau
- Keith D. Lillemoe
- Xihong Lin
- Catherine R. Lucey
- Ellen J. MacKenzie
- Marty Makary
- Bradley A. Malin
- George Mashour
- Ann McKee
- Barbara J. Meyer
- Matthew L. Meyerson
- Terrie E. Moffitt
- Sean J. Morrison
- Charles A. Nelson III
- Kunle Odunsi
- Lucila Ohno-Machado
- Jordan S. Orange
- Beverley A. Orser
- Lori J. Pierce
- Daniel Polsky
- Hector P. Rodriguez
- Stuart Schreiber
- Arlene Sharpe
- Marie Celeste Simon
- Albert Siu
- Ralph L. Sacco
- Claire E. Sterk
- Susan E. Stone
- Sylvia Trent-Adams
- Kara Odom Walker
- Peter Walter
- Xiaobin Wang
- Ronald J. Weigel
- Rachel M. Werner
- Janey L. Wiggs
- Teresa Woodruff
- King-Wai Yau

=== 2019 ===
- Edwin (Ted) G. Abel
- Denise Aberle
- Charles S. Abrams
- Anthony Adamis
- Adaora Adimora
- Julia Adler-Milstein
- Nita Ahuja
- C. David Allis
- David Amaral
- Vineet Arora
- Carol Baker
- Colleen Barry
- Elaine Batchlor
- Peter Bearman
- Sangeeta Bhatia
- L. Ebony Boulware
- Charles Branas
- David Cella
- Deborah Cohen
- Dorin Comaniciu
- Rui Costa
- Rebecca Miriam Cunningham
- Hongjie Dai
- James Tilmon Dalton
- Beverly Davidson
- George Demiris
- Raymond N. DuBois Jr.
- James Eberwine
- Elizabeth Engle
- Deborah Estrin
- Betty Ferrell
- Jorge E. Galán
- Tejal Kanti Gandhi
- Sharon Gerecht
- Margaret Goodell
- Laura Gottlieb
- Stephan Grupp
- Sanjay Gupta
- J. Silvio Gutkind
- Daphne Haas-Kogan
- Julia Haller
- M. Elizabeth Halloran
- Diane Havlir
- Debra Houry
- Akiko Iwasaki
- Elizabeth Jaffee
- S. Claiborne (Clay) Johnston
- Rainu Kaushal
- K. Craig Kent
- Adrian R. Krainer
- Peter Kihwan Lee
- Richard Legro
- Michael Lenardo
- Ernst Robert Lengyel
- Scott Lowe
- Carol Mangione
- Elaine Mardis
- Peter Margolis
- Ellen Meara
- David Meyers
- Guo-li Ming
- Kathleen Neuzil
- Craig Newgard
- Luigi Notarangelo
- Gabriel Núñez
- Andre Nussenzweig
- Krzysztof Palczewski
- Julie Parsonnet
- Jonathan Alan Patz
- Rafael Perez-Escamilla
- Susan Quaggin
- Scott L. Rauch
- John A. Rogers
- Anil Rustgi
- David Schatz
- Dorry Segev
- Julie Segre
- Nenad Sestan
- Peter Slavin
- Benjamin D. Sommers
- Beth Stevens
- Jacquelyn Taylor
- Mehmet Toner
- Peter Ubel
- Nicholas Wald
- Catherine S. Woolley
- Catherine J. Wu
- Joseph C. Wu
- Kristine Yaffe
- Rachel Yehuda
- Richard A. Young

=== 2020 ===
- Susan Ackerman
- Rexford S. Ahima
- Mark S. Anderson
- Sonia Y. Angell
- Kyriacos A. Athanasiou
- Andrea Baccarelli
- Regan Bailey
- Laurence C. Baker
- Gilda Barabino
- Deanna Barch
- Dan Barouch
- Randall John Bateman
- Michelle L. Bell
- William Beltran
- Frederick DuBois Bowman
- Myles A. Brown
- Brendan G. Carr
- Nancy Carrasco
- Edward F. Chang
- Judy Cho
- Augustine Choi
- Peter Choyke
- Wendy Chung
- D. Wade Clapp
- Daniel Colón-Ramos
- Yolonda Lorig Colson
- Joanne Conroy
- Merit Cudkowicz
- Ralph DeBerardinis
- Ronald DeMatteo
- Justin B. Dimick
- Cynthia E. Dunbar
- B. Mark Evers
- Heinz Feldmann
- Toren Finkel
- David E. Fisher
- Scott E. Fraser
- Christopher Friese
- Sherine Gabriel
- Levi Garraway
- Jeffrey Louis Goldberg
- Steven N. Goodman
- Eric Gouaux
- Garth Graham
- William Grobman
- John Halamka
- Patrick Heagerty
- Joel Hirschhorn
- Vivian Ho
- Holly Humphrey
- Denise Jamieson
- Joel Kaufman
- Aaron Kesselheim
- Alex Kolodkin
- Kam Leong
- Fei-Fei Li
- Judy Lieberman
- Marc Lipsitch
- David R. Liu
- Susan Margulies
- Kameron Leigh Matthews
- Justin C. McArthur
- Velma McBride Murry
- Matthew D. McHugh
- Jerry R. Mendell
- Raina Merchant
- Redonda Miller
- Karin M. Muraszko
- Alondra Nelson
- Kypros H. Nicolaides
- Henry L. Paulson
- Corinne Peek-Asa
- Anne M. Rafferty
- Aleksandar Rajkovic
- Aviv Regev
- Antoni Ribas
- Paul Ridker
- Pardis C. Sabeti
- Eiichi Saitoh
- Hongjun Song
- Louis M. Staudt
- Patricia Stone
- Sean D. Sullivan
- Melody A. Swartz
- Herman A. Taylor, Jr.
- Hannah A. Valantine
- Amy L. Vincent
- Robert M. Wachter
- Amy K. Wagner
- Chen Wang
- David S. Wilkes
- Consuelo H. Wilkins
- Tien Y. Wong
- Carlos A. Zarate, Jr.
- Xiaowei Zhuang

=== 2021 ===
- Samuel Achilefu
- Alexandra K. Adams
- Michelle Albert
- Guillermo Ameer
- Jamy D. Ard
- John M. Balbus
- Carolina Barillas-Mury
- Shari Barkin
- Monica Bertagnolli
- Luciana Borio
- Erik Brodt
- Kendall Marvin Campbell
- Pablo A. Celnik
- David E. Clapham
- Mandy Cohen
- Daniel E. Dawes
- Ted M. Dawson
- Job Dekker
- Nancy-Ann DeParle
- Maximilian Diehn
- Kafui Dzirasa
- Katherine A. Fitzgerald
- Yuman Fong
- Howard Frumkin
- Andrés J. Garcia
- Darrell J. Gaskin
- Wondwossen Gebreyes
- Jessica Gill
- Paul Ginsburg
- Sherita Hill Golden
- Joseph Gone
- Joseph D. Grabenstein
- Linda G. Griffith
- Taekjip Ha
- William C. Hahn
- Helena Hansen
- Mary Hatten
- Mary Hawn
- Zhigang He
- Hugh Carroll Hemmings Jr.
- Rene Hen
- Helen Heslop
- Renee Hsia
- Lori L. Isom
- Kathrin Jansen
- Christine Kreuder Johnson
- Mariana Julieta Kaplan
- Elisa Konofagou
- Jay Lemery
- Joan L. Luby
- Kenneth David Mandl
- Jennifer Manly
- Elizabeth M. McNally
- Nancy Messonnier
- Michelle Monje
- Vamsi Mootha
- Lennart Mucke
- Vivek Murthy
- Jane Wimpfheimer Newburger
- Keith C. Norris
- Marcella Nunez-Smith
- Osagie Obasogie
- Jacqueline Nwando Olayiwola
- Bruce Ovbiagele
- Drew Pardoll
- Guillermo Prado
- Carla Pugh
- Charles M. Rice
- Marylyn D. Ritchie
- Yvette Roubideaux
- Eric Rubin
- Renee Salas
- Thomas Sequist
- Kosali Simon
- Melissa Simon
- Anil Kumar Sood
- Reisa Sperling
- Sarah Szanton
- Sarah Tishkoff
- Peter Tontonoz
- JoAnn Trejo
- Gilbert Rivers Upchurch Jr.
- Tener Goodwin Veenema
- Leslie B. Vosshall
- Rochelle Walensky
- Elizabeth Winzeler
- Cynthia Wolberger
- Anita Zaidi
- Shannon Nicole Zenk
- Feng Zhang

=== 2022 ===
- Opeolu M. Adeoye
- Pedro L. Alonso
- Marcella Alsan
- Julie A. Baldwin
- Mark F. Bear
- Seth F. Berkley
- Craig D. Blackstone
- Carlos Blanco
- Arleen F. Brown
- Namandjé N. Bumpus
- Martin D. Burke
- Helen Burstin
- Nicole Calakos
- Yvette Calderon
- Peter J. Campbell
- Diarmid Campbell-Lendrum
- Christopher S. Carpenter
- Ana Mari Cauce
- Zhijian Chen
- Regina S. Cunnhingham
- Bart De Strooper
- Deborah V. Deas
- Jan Deprest
- Connie J. Eaves
- Marie-Carmelle Elie
- Wafaie Fawzi
- Henri R. Ford
- Elizabeth J. Fowler
- Wayne A. I. Frederick
- Katherine A. Gallagher
- Sankar Ghosh
- Peter M. Glazer
- Farshid Guilak
- David H. Gutmann
- Michele Heisler
- Tracey Holloway
- Lora V. Hooper
- Elizabeth A. Howell
- Judith A. James
- Steven Joffe
- Sheena A. Josselyn
- Gagandeep Kang
- Katalin Karikó
- Farees Khan
- Sachin Kheterpal
- Laura L. Kiessling
- Jonathan Kipnis
- Eugene V. Koonin
- Dimitri Krainc
- Grace M. Lee
- Rachel L. Levine
- Anna S. Lok
- Crystal L. Mackall
- Tippi C. MacKenzie
- Edward W. Maibach
- Miguel Marino
- James M. Markert
- Peter W. Marks
- Robert J. Mash
- Michelle K. McGuire
- Michael J. McWilliams Jr.
- Paul S. Mischel
- Lisa M. Monteggia
- Rachel A. Morello-Frosch
- Margaret Moss
- Bhramar Mukherjee
- Kari C. Nadeau
- Victor Nizet
- John N. Nkengasong
- Akinlolu Ojo
- Saad B. Omer
- Anthony E. Oro
- Jose A. Pagan
- Vikram Patel
- Monica E. Peek
- Christine A. Petersen
- Katherine S. Pollard
- Kornelia Polyak
- John Quackenbush
- Megan L. Ranney
- W. Kimryn Rathmell
- Marc E. Rothenberg
- Norman Sharpless
- Krishna V. Shenoy
- Yang Shi
- Ida Sim
- Mario Sims
- Gwendolyn Sowa
- Sohail F. Tavazoie
- Marleen Temmerman
- Sally Temple
- Alan T. Tita
- Bruce J. Tromberg
- Chien-Wen Tseng
- David A. Tuveson
- Omaida C. Velazquez
- Jennifer Webster-Cyriaque
- Drew Weissman
- Ruth E. Zambrana

=== 2023 ===
- Charles O. Agyemang
- Daniel G. Anderson
- Kimberly D. Anderson-Erisman
- Celso Arango
- Lukoye Atwoli
- Michael S. Avidan
- Karen Bandeen-Roche
- Kurt T. Barnhart
- Regina Barzilay
- Susan Baserga
- Rashid Bashir
- Bradley Bernstein
- Joseph Betancourt
- Marian Betz
- Sara N. Bleich
- Nils Brose
- Hélène Carabin
- John D. Carpten
- Patrick M. Carter
- Timothy A. Chan
- Michael F. Chiang
- Tumaini R. Coker
- Theodore Corbin
- Deidra C. Crews
- Gail D'Onofrio
- Karina W. Davidson
- Roger J. Davis
- Luis A. Diaz
- Daniel J. Drucker
- Kojo Elenitoba-Johnson
- Sarah K. England
- Daniele M. Fallin
- Maurizio Fava
- Guoping Feng
- Sandy Feng
- Christopher B. Forrest
- Debra Furr-Holden
- Susan L. Furth
- Richard L. Gallo
- Francisco Garcia
- Cheryl Giscombe
- Céline Gounder
- David C. Grabowski
- Eric D. Green
- Justin Hanes
- Christian T. Happi
- Richard J. Hatchett
- Jiang He
- Said A. Ibrahim
- Marta Imamura
- Thomas V. Inglesby
- Darrell J. Irvine
- Anne M. Johnson
- Ursula B. Kaiser
- Joneigh S. Khaldun
- Christopher F. Koller
- Wilbur A. Lam
- Steven D. Leach
- Jeannie T. Lee
- Lois K. Lee
- Kirsten E. Lyke
- Yvonne Maldonado
- Miriam Merad
- Timothy M. Miller
- Robert A. Montgomery
- Gerardo Moreno
- Siddhartha Mukherjee
- Lisa A. Newman
- Jens Nielsen
- Igho Ofotokun
- Herminia Palacio
- Desmond U. Patton
- Raina K. Plowright
- Keshia M. Pollack Porter
- Kristy Red-Horse
- Teri Reynolds
- Joseph B. Richardson
- Lainie F. Ross
- Ali Rowhani-Rahbar
- Mustafa Sahin
- Joseph V. Sakran
- Rebecca A. Seguin-Fowler
- Morgan Sheng
- Catherine Y. Spong
- Timothy A. Springer
- Brent R. Stockwell
- Rudolph E. Tanzi
- Julian F. Thayer
- Methodius G. Tuuli
- Robert O. Valdez
- Terry L. Vanden Hoek
- Robert H. Vonderheide
- Emily A. Wang
- Jennifer Wargo
- Daniel W. Webster
- Jennifer L. West
- Jedd D. Wolchok
- Phillip D. Zamore
- Hongkui Zeng
- Yi Zhang

=== 2024 ===
- Toyin Ajayi
- Zoltan P. Arany
- Paola Arlotta
- Carlos L. Arteaga
- Tracy L. Bale
- Jarbas Barbosa da Silva
- Jonathan F. Bean
- Nina Bhardwaj
- Maria Elena Bottazzi
- Kathryn H. Bowles
- Chiquita Brooks-LaSure
- Robert D. Bullard
- Jason A. Burdick
- Jennifer Carlson
- Bob S. Carter
- Stephen J. Chanock
- Kelly Chibale
- Christopher G. Chute
- Janine Austin Clayton
- I. Glenn Cohen
- George Coukos
- Lisa M. Coussens
- Lindsey A. Criswell
- Chinazo Cunningham
- Leemore Dafny
- Teresa A. Davis
- David Dranove
- Patricia C. Dykes
- Peter J. Embi
- Alicia Fernandez
- Erol Fikrig
- Silvia C. Formenti
- Nicholas P. Franks
- Monika K. Goyal
- Marcia Haigis
- Scott D. Halpern
- Joseph Heitman
- Sally L. Hodder
- David Huang
- Shawna V. Hudson
- Nola M. Hylton
- Reshma Jagsi
- Yishi Jin
- Peter A. Jones
- Joseph K. Kaholokula
- Christine Laine
- Kenneth M. Langa
- Haifan Lin
- Massimo Loda
- Beatriz Luna
- Trudy F. Mackay
- Nicole A. Maestas
- David J. Mangelsdorf
- Jeanne M. Marrazzo
- Erica E. Marsh
- Dayna B. Matthew
- Margaret M. McCarthy
- Genevieve Melton-Meaux
- Dan Merenstein
- Funda Meric-Bernstam
- Matthew J. Miller
- Julie Morita
- Sally C. Morton
- Niki M. Moutsopoulos
- Avindra Nath
- Thumbi Ndung'u
- Jennifer Nuzzo
- Friday Okonofua
- Santa J. Ono
- David Pellman
- Priscilla E. Pemu
- Mary L. Phillips
- Olivier Pourquié
- Mark R. Prausnitz
- Uma M. Reddy
- Juergen A. Richt
- Selwyn O. Rogers
- Jeffrey D. Rothstein
- David H. Rowitch
- Dana G. Safran
- Christine E. Schmidt
- Nina F. Schor
- Deborah Schrag
- Aziz Sheikh
- Janet K. Smylie
- Eugenia South
- Konstantina M. Stankovic
- David M. Studdert
- Lorenz Studer
- Henrik T. Sørensen
- Sarah J. Tabrizi
- Alexis A. Thompson
- Matthew G. Vander Heiden
- Fan Wang
- Donna L. Washington
- Mitchell J. Weiss
- Edward John Wherry III
- Garen J. Wintemute
- Hao Wu
- Marc A. Zimmerman

=== 2025 ===
- Omar Abdel-Wahab
- Naeemah Abrahams
- Ibrahim Abubakar
- Mohammed K. Ali
- Andrea A. Anderson
- Aline Andres
- Euan Ashley
- Wanda Barfield
- Joseph T. Bass
- Facundo D. Batista
- Sian Beilock
- Gail E. Besner
- Gerd A. Blobel
- Allison Brashear
- Martina Brueckner
- John C. Byrd
- Peter Calabresi
- David M. Carlisle
- S. Thomas Carmichael Jr.
- Cameron S. Carter
- Christopher S. Chen
- Lieping Chen
- Carrie Colla
- Pamela Y. Collins
- Esa M. Davis
- Christine E. Dehlendorf
- Terence S. Dermody
- Stacie B. Dusetzina
- Christina D. Economos
- Neill Epperson
- Dee E. Fenner
- Robert L. Ferris
- Daniel A. Fletcher
- Wendy S. Garrett
- Barney S. Graham
- Joel Habener (d.)
- Suzanne Haber
- Lisa Hope Harris
- Andrea Hayes Dixon
- Jie He
- William Hersh
- Tamas L. Horvath
- Sun Hur
- Chandy C. John
- Seun Johnson-Akeju
- Paule Valery Joseph
- Samuel M. Kariuki
- Dina Katabi
- Pearse A. Keane
- David Kirsch
- Frederick Korley
- Katy Kozhimannil
- Deanna L. Kroetz
- Darius Lakdawalla
- Michael C. Lu
- Michael E. Matheny
- Michael J. Meaney
- Samantha Meltzer-Brody
- Joshua Mendell
- Tomislav Mihaljevic
- Thomas J. Montine
- Wanda K. Nicholson
- Paul W. Noble
- Mayowa Ojo Owolabi
- Sabrina Paganoni
- Duojia Pan
- Maureen G. Phipps
- Ninez Alafriz Ponce
- Anita Raj
- Rebecca R. Richards-Kortum
- P. David Rogers
- Eben L. Rosenthal
- Kathleen Rubins
- Michel Sadelain
- Enrique Schisterman
- Erin M. Schuman
- Margaret Schwarze
- Jay Shendure
- Molly Morag Stevens
- Edwin M. Stone
- Elizabeth A. Stuart
- Charlotte Sumner
- Katalin Susztak
- Karel Svoboda
- Charles Swanton
- J. Paul Taylor
- Sarah Amalia Teichmann
- Ravi Thadhani
- Joseph W. Thompson
- Alice Ting
- Stephen Francis Traynelis
- Patricia L. Turner
- Victor E. Velculescu
- Lihong V. Wang
- Donald Warne
- Sing Sing Way
- Pamela Woodard
- Tracey Jean Woodruff
- Clifford J. Woolf
- Anthony J. Wynshaw-Boris
