= William Sage =

William Sage may refer to:

- Bill Sage (born 1962), American actor
- William H. Sage (1859–1922), U.S. Army general and Medal of Honor recipient
- William M. Sage, American lawyer

== See also ==
- Bill Le Sage (1927–2001), British musician
