= Demets =

Demets, DeMets, or De Mets is a surname. Notable people with the surname include:

- David DeMets (born 1944), American biostatistician
- Eugène Demets (1858–1923), French music publisher
- Fernand Demets (1884–1952), Belgian politician
- Gertjan De Mets (born 1987), Belgian footballer
- Stéphane Demets (born 1976), Belgian footballer
