= Kenneth Ramos =

American physician and scientist

- Born: Ely, Nevada

Academic background
- Education: BS, University of Puerto Rico; MD, University of Louisville Health Sciences Center; PhD, University of Texas at Austin
- Thesis: Sequence of myocardial alterations induced by isoproterenol in primary cultures of rat heart cells (1983)

Kenneth S. Ramos is an American physician-scientist.

== Early life and education ==
Ramos received his undergraduate degree from the University of Puerto Rico, his medical degree from the University of Louisville Health Sciences Center, and his Ph.D. from the University of Texas at Austin.

== Career ==
Following his PhD, Ramos joined the University of Louisville Health Sciences Center where he served as a distinguished scholar and professor in the Department of Biochemistry and Molecular Biology. In 2014, he joined the University of Arizona as their Associate Vice President for Precision Health Sciences at the Arizona Health Sciences Center. The following year, he was elected a member of the National Academy of Medicine for his research in genomics and predictive biology, environmental and molecular medicine, and toxicology. He remained at the University of Arizona until 2019 when he accepted an appointment as executive director of the Institute of Biosciences and Technology in Houston and assistant vice chancellor for Health Services at the Texas A&M University System.

== Personal life ==
Ramos and his wife Irma have two children together.
