= Cornelius Rosse =

American educator and author

Cornelius Rosse is an academic educator and author in the field of anatomy, combined with foundational and applied ontology. He is a Professor Emeritus of the University of Washington School of Medicine.

He is known as the principal investigator of the Foundational Model of Anatomy (FMA) ontology. He is a Fellow of the American Association for the Advancement of Science and the American College of Medical Informatics, and he was elected to the National Academy of Sciences in 2001.

== Education and career ==
His medical career began by having to flee from Budapest as a first-year medical student to avoid persecution for his participation in the 1956 Hungarian Revolution.

Rosse earned his medical degree (M.B., Ch.B.) in 1964 from the University of Bristol. The university later awarded him two additional doctoral degrees: an M.D. in 1974 and a D.Sc. in 1983, in recognition of his research on blood cell formation and the body’s anticancer mechanisms. He completed his postgraduate training at the University of Bristol and went on to join the faculty as a Demonstrator of Anatomy.

In 1965 he joined the Department of Anatomy of the University of Bristol as a junior member of the faculty. Parallel with his teaching, he began to investigate the existence of the hematopoietic stem cell, which at the time was a mere hypothesis.

In 1967 he was appointed as an Assistant Professor in the Department of Biological Structure at the University of Washington School of Medicine. He advanced through the academic ranks, serving as Chair of the Department of Biological Structure from 1981 to 1993. In 2000 he relinquished his tenured faculty position and continued his research work as Professor Emeritus.

In the early 1980s, Rosse shifted his research focus from biological bench research to the representation of anatomical knowledge in computer-processable forms.

To support this, Rosse developed the Foundational Model of Anatomy (FMA) ontology, which was curated and expanded by L.V.J. Mejino M.D., the FMA’s senior research scientist.

== Selected publications ==
=== Journals ===
- Rosse, C.; Mejino, J. L.; Modayur, B. R.; Jakobovits, R.; Hinshaw, K. P.; Brinkley, J. F. (1998-01-01). "Motivation and Organizational Principles for Anatomical Knowledge Representation: The Digital Anatomist Symbolic Knowledge Base". Journal of the American Medical Informatics Association. 5 (1): 17–40. doi:10.1136/jamia.1998.0050017. ISSN 1067-5027. PMC 61273. PMID 9452983.
- ROSSE, CORNELIUS (1970). "Two Morphologically and Kinetically Distinct Populations of Lymphoid Cells in the Bone Marrow". Nature. 227 (5253): 73–75. Bibcode:1970Natur.227...73R. doi:10.1038/227073a0. ISSN 0028-0836. PMID 5422629.
- Rosse, Cornelius; Mejino, José L. V. (2008), "The Foundational Model of Anatomy Ontology", Computational Biology, London: Springer London, pp. 59–117, doi:10.1007/978-1-84628-885-2_4, ISBN 978-1-84628-884-5
- Cook, D.L.; Mejino, J.L.V.; Rosse, C. (2004). "The foundational model of anatomy: A template for the symbolic representation of multi-scale physiological functions". The 26th Annual International Conference of the IEEE Engineering in Medicine and Biology Society. Vol. 4. IEEE. pp. 5415–5418. doi:10.1109/IEMBS.2004.1404513. ISBN 978-0-7803-8439-2. PMID 17271570.
- Rosse, Cornelius (1995). "The Potential of Computerized Representations of Anatomy in the Training of Health Care Providers". Academic Medicine. 70 (6): 499–505. doi:10.1097/00001888-199506000-00010. PMID 7786369.
- Rosse, Cornelius; Mejino, Jose L. V.; Modayur, Bharath R.; Jakobovits, Rex M.; Hinshaw, Kevin P.; Brinkley, James F. (1998). "Motivation and Organizational Principles for Anatomical Knowledge Representation: The Digital Anatomist Symbolic Knowledge Base". Journal of the American Medical Informatics Association. 5 (1): 17–40. doi:10.1136/jamia.1998.0050017. PMC 61273. PMID 9452983.
- Sundsten, J. W.; Brinkley, James F.; Conley, D. M.; Eno, Kraig R.; Kastella, K. G.; Rosse, Cornelius (1992). "Three-dimensional computer graphics reconstructions of anatomy on videodisc". J. Audiovisual Media in Medicine. 15 (2): 65–67.
- Kim, S.; Brinkley, James F.; Rosse, Cornelius (2003). "Profile of On-Line Anatomy Information Resources: Design and Instructional Implications". Clinical Anatomy. 16 (1): 55–71. doi:10.1002/ca.10088. PMID 12486740.
- Rosse, Cornelius (1995). "The Potential of Computerized Representations of Anatomy in the Training of Health Care Providers". Academic Medicine. 70 (6): 499–505. doi:10.1097/00001888-199506000-00010. PMID 7786369.
- Rosse, Cornelius (1995). "The Potential of Computerized Representations of Anatomy in the Training of Health Care Providers". Academic Medicine. 70 (6): 499–505. doi:10.1097/00001888-199506000-00010. PMID 7786369.
- Rosse, Cornelius (2000). "Terminologia Anatomica; Considered from the Perspective of Next-Generation Knowledge Sources". Clinical Anatomy. 14 (2): 120–133. doi:10.1002/1098-2353(200103)14:2<120::AID-CA1020>3.0.CO;2-V. PMID 11241747.

=== Books ===
- Rosse, Cornelius; Clawson, Kay D. (1980). The Musculoskeletal System in Health and Disease. Hagerstown: Harper & Row. ISBN 978-0-06-142287-4.
