= Shawna Hudson =

American medical sociologist and primary care researcher

Shawna V. Hudson
- Education: Rutgers University
- Scientific career
- Workplaces: Rutgers University
- Thesis: Watching sex on TV : reinterpreting content using a sociological gaze (2001)

Shawna Hudson is an American medical sociologist and primary care researcher who is a professor at the Rutgers University. She is the Henry Rutgers Chair of Family Medicine and Community Health and Vice Chancellor for the Dissemination and Implementation Science. She was elected member of the National Academy of Medicine in 2024.

== Early life and education ==
Hudson completed her undergraduate degree at Rutgers University, where she majored in sociology. She remained there for her graduate studies, where she became interested in public health through a sociological lens. Her early research looked to understand the character of television portrayals of sexuality.

== Research and career ==
Hudson's career has focused on improving the United States healthcare system. She is particularly interested in helping vulnerable and underserved populations.

Hudson leads an Agency for Healthcare Research and Quality Learning Health System Embedded Scientist Training and Research (LHS E-STaR) Center in New Jersey, which helps future generations of scientists deliver patient-centered care. During the COVID-19 pandemic, Hudson led a study funded by the NIH Rapid Acceleration of Diagnostics for Underserved Populations (RADxUP) initiative to improve access to COVID-19 testing for underserved populations.

In 2024, Hudson was elected to the National Academy of Medicine.

== Selected publications ==
- Larissa Nekhlyudov; Denalee M O'malley; Shawna V. Hudson (1 January 2017). "Integrating primary care providers in the care of cancer survivors: gaps in evidence and future opportunities". The Lancet Oncology. 18 (1): e30–e38. doi:10.1016/s1470-2045(16)30570-8. ISSN 1470-2045. PMC 5553291. PMID 28049575. Wikidata Q38775140.
- Jeanne M Ferrante; Bijal A Balasubramanian; Shawna V Hudson; Benjamin F Crabtree (1 March 2010). "Principles of the patient-centered medical home and preventive services delivery". Annals of Family Medicine. 8 (2): 108–116. doi:10.1370/afm.1080. ISSN 1544-1709. PMC 2834717. PMID 20212297. Wikidata Q33711941.
- Shawna V. Hudson; Suzanne M Miller; Jennifer Hemler; Jeanne M Ferrante; Jennifer Lyle; Kevin C Oeffinger; Robert S Dipaola (1 September 2012). "Adult cancer survivors discuss follow-up in primary care: 'not what i want, but maybe what i need'". Annals of Family Medicine. 10 (5): 418–427. doi:10.1370/afm.1379. ISSN 1544-1709. PMC 3438209. PMID 22966105. Wikidata Q36222883.
