= Amy J. Houtrow =

American pediatrician

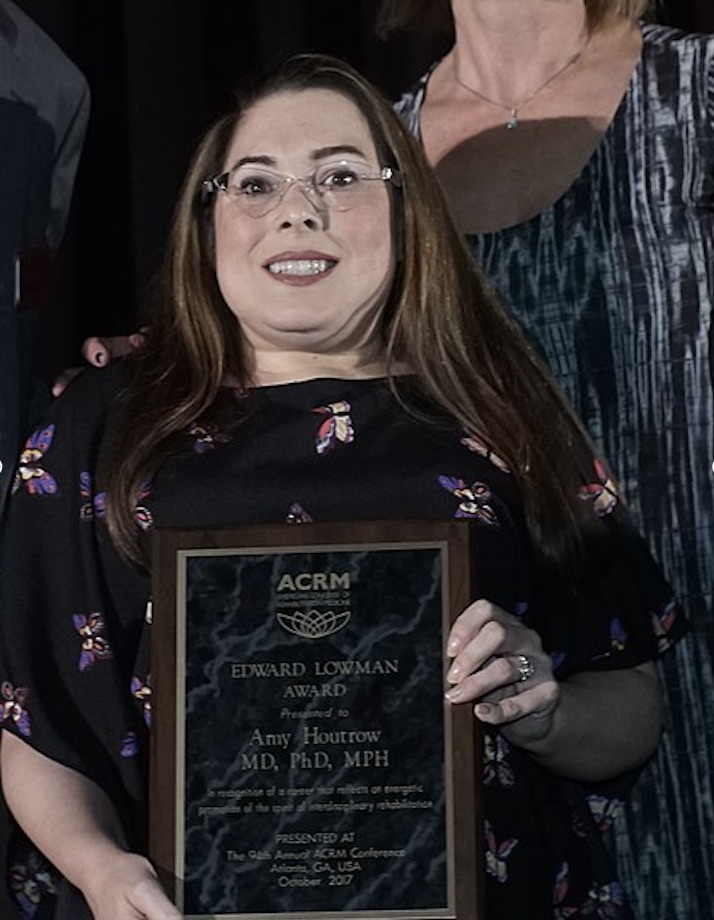
- Houtrow accepting the ACRM Conference Award in 2017
- Born: 1974 (age 51–52) (Note: In 2015, Houtrow was reported to be 40); Kalamazoo, Michigan, USA

Academic background
- Education: B.A., health sciences, 1996, Kalamazoo College; M.D., 2000, Michigan State University; M.P.H., 2004, University of Michigan; PhD, 2012, University of California, San Francisco
- Thesis: Children with Disabilities and Impacts on Families. (2012)

Academic work
- Institutions: University of Pittsburgh School of Medicine

Amy Joy Houtrow (born 1974) is an American pediatrician and physical medicine and rehabilitation physician. She is the Endowed Professor in the Department of Physical Medicine and Rehabilitation at the University of Pittsburgh School of Medicine.

Born with a rare genetic bone disorder, Houtrow earned her medical degree from Michigan State University and began practicing medicine in Michigan and Pittsburgh. In 2018, Houtrow was elected a Member of the National Academy of Medicine for her "research evaluating disability trends in childhood and the interactions among families, the health system, and social factors, which has uncovered disparities with enormous policy implications for the pediatric population."

== Early life and education ==
Born and raised in Kalamazoo, Michigan, Houtrow was diagnosed with a rare genetic bone disorder at birth. She attended Loy Norrix High School where she earned the Heyl Scholarship to attend Kalamazoo College. She earned her Bachelor of Arts in health sciences from the college before enrolling in Michigan State University for her medical degree and the University of Michigan for her Master's degree in public health. She completed her PhD at the University of California, San Francisco in 2012.

== Career ==
While completing her PhD, Houtrow was appointed the chief of the Division of Pediatric Rehabilitation Medicine at the Children’s Hospital of Pittsburgh within the University of Pittsburgh School of Medicine (UPMC). In her early years as chief, she led studies that found more children developed disabilities than those a decade ago, with the increase predominantly occurring in middle-class families. Three years after her appointment, Houtrow was named to the pediatric standing committee for the National Quality Forum pediatric measurement endorsement project. In 2017, she found that the development of asthma, attention deficit hyperactivity disorder, and autism spectrum disorder were directly influenced by poverty status.

As a result of her research, Houtrow was promoted to Full professor and awarded the endowed chair for pediatric rehabilitation medicine. She also sits on various editorial boards including Disability and Health journal and serves on the Executive Committee for numerous American Academy of Pediatrics and National Academy of Medicine boards. In 2018, Houtrow was elected a Member of the National Academy of Medicine for her "research evaluating disability trends in childhood and the interactions among families, the health system, and social factors, which has uncovered disparities with enormous policy implications for the pediatric population." Two years later, she received the 2020 Women in Rehabilitation Science Award from the American Congress of Rehabilitation Medicine for "her contributions to physical medicine and rehabilitation, and as a strong role model for women in science."
