= Thomas J. Coates =

American HIV/AIDS researcher

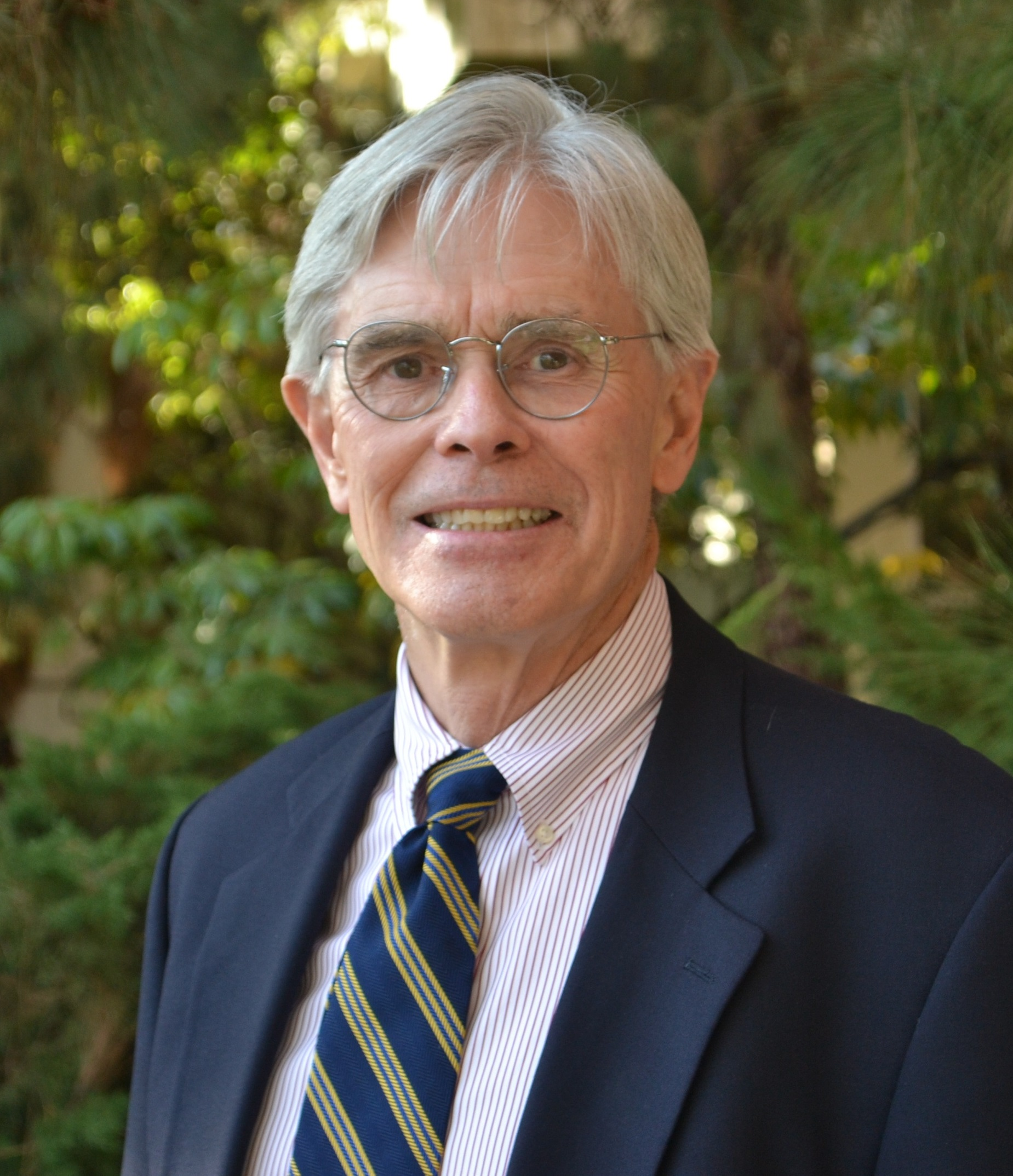

Thomas J. Coates (born 1945) is the Director of the multi-campus University of California Global Health Institute, a UC-wide initiative established to improve health and reduce the burden of disease throughout the world. He is Professor Emeritus at the UCLA David Geffen School of Medicine and Founding Director of the UCLA Center for World Health, a joint initiative of the David Geffen School of Medicine at UCLA and UCLA Health, He has conducted extensive research in the realm of HIV and is the Michael and Sue Steinberg Endowed Professor of Global AIDS Research within the Division of Infectious Diseases at UCLA and Distinguished Professor of Medicine. Health-related behavior is of particular interest to Coates. Throughout his career as a health expert, his theory-based research has been focused on interventions aimed at reducing risks and threats to health

== Education ==
Coates studied at San Luis Rey College and obtained his BA in Philosophy in 1968. He attended San Jose State University from 1968 to 1971, receiving his Master's in Psychology. He also completed his PhD in Counseling Psychology at Stanford University in 1977.

== Career ==
Coates joined the Department of Psychiatry at Johns Hopkins University School of Medicine with a joint appointment in the Bloomberg School of Public Health in 1979 and served on the Faculty at Johns Hopkins until 1982.

In 1982, the University of California San Francisco, School of Medicine appointed him faculty of the Department of Medicine, Division of Primary Care Internal Medicine.

In 1986, during the height of the HIV epidemic and fueled by his passion for infectious disease research, Coates co-founded the Center for AIDS Prevention Studies at UCSF, directing it from 1991 to 2003. In 1996, coordinating and integrating all of UCSF's AIDS research activities under an umbrella of 60 programs and laboratories, Coates founded the AIDS Research Institute, and was its Executive Director until 2003. With funding from USAID and WHO, Coates led a randomized control trial to determine the efficacy of HIV voluntary counseling and testing in Kenya, Trinidad, and Tanzania. As the principal investigator for Project Accept (HPTN 043), Coates led a study on the effect of community-based voluntary counseling and testing on HIV incidence in a cluster-randomized trial in 48 communities at five sites in South Africa, Tanzania, Zimbabwe, and Thailand. He also led a prevention clinical trial in South America. In 2000, he was elected as a member of the Institute of Medicine.

Coates' studies on the pivotal role of behavioral science in combating the HIV/AIDS epidemic have been a catalyst for social change. In 2013, Coates received the Elizabeth Fries Health Education Award in appreciation of his pioneering HIV-related research and to honor his contributions to public health.

Aside from HIV prevention, Coates' areas of emphasis are centered on global health and international health policy.

== Honors and awards ==
- 2015 Unsung Hero Award, Blood:Water, Nashville, Tennessee
- 2013 The Elizabeth Fries Health Education Award/Society of Public Health Education
- 2004 Award for Distinguished Contribution to Research in the Public Policy, American Psychological Association, Washington, DC
- 2000 Elected to the Institute of Medicine (now the National Academy of Medicine) of the National Academy of Sciences
- 1996 Stop AIDS Project, Sam B. Puckett Memorial HIV Prevention Award, for leadership and dedication in the fight against AIDS
- 1994 Centers for Disease Control, Charles C. Shepard Science Award, for program participation and presentation, "HIV Prevention Programs in Research: What Have We Accomplished and Where Do We Need to Go?"
- 1991 American Psychological Association, Division of Health Psychology Award, for outstanding contribution to health psychology
