= Ralph Weichselbaum =

American physician

Ralph R. Weichselbaum (born 12 December 1945 in Chicago) is an American physician specializing in radiation oncology, a member of the Institute of Medicine of the National Academy of Sciences, Ludwig professor, He is Daniel K. Ludwig Distinguished Service Professor of Radiation Oncology and Chairman, Department of Radiation and Cellular Oncology, at the University of Chicago Pritzker School of Medicine, and Head of the University of Chicago Center for Radiation Therapy, and the director of the Chicago Tumor Institute. Weichselbaum is also Co- Director of the Ludwig Center for Metastasis Research at the University of Chicago.

== Biography ==
Weichselbaum grew up in Chicago, Illinois and completed his undergraduate degree at University of Wisconsin, Madison. He obtained his medical degree from the University of Illinois at Chicago in 1971. Following a research fellowship in surgical oncology, he completed his residency at the Harvard Medical School's Joint Center for Radiation Therapy in 1975. He did a fellowship with John B. Little at the Harvard School of Public Health After completing this fellowship he joined the faculty of the Harvard Medical School, remaining a faculty member until 1984 and reaching the rank of Associate Professor in the Department of Radiation Oncology. He was jointly appointed in Cancer Biology at the Harvard School of Public Health. In 1984 he was recruited as Chair of the Department of Radiation & Cellular Oncology in the Division of Biological Sciences at the University of Chicago to head up their program and has remained there since. He is currently a professor at University of Chicago in Hyde Park, Chicago. He is married to Donna Weichselbaum and has three children. He is listed on hundreds of patents and pending patents, is an author on more than 790 publications and has been cited over 1600 times on a famous Head and Neck Cancer article in the New England Journal of Medicine . He is also co-editor of Cancer Medicine, a comprehensive textbook on cancer. He is a recipient of the 2018 David A. Karnofsky Memorial Award.

== Career ==
Weichselbaum's research interests range from innovative multidisciplinary clinical programs in head and neck cancer treatments, to laboratory studies of repair signal transduction and DNA recombination, ionizing radiation, gene-targeted radiotherapy, chemoprevention, gene expression profiling in cancer, and angiogenic therapy. Much of this work was done in collaboration with Donald Kufe at The Harvard Medical School. Most recently Weichselbaum in collaboration with Yang Xin Fu has identified a role for large dose radiotherapy in the stimulation of the immune system and a critical role for interferon expression in both host and tumor responses to radiotherapy. Weichselbaum was strongly influenced in his studies of virus and radiation and the interaction of radiation and interferon by Bernard Roizman.

He and Samuel Hellman were the first to propose the oligometastatic paradigm while advocating use of local control to prevent systemic spread and use as potentially curative treatment. The oligometastatic paradigm of cancer has been used by medical oncologists, surgical oncologists, interventional radiologists, and radiation oncologists to increase long-term survival with appropriately targeted therapy. Dr. Weichselbaum was an early advocate of using utility curves to guide cancer treatment rather than focusing solely on five-year survival rates, and set up the first Department of Radiation and Cellular Oncology. He is a founding scientist of GenVec, creating an adenovector to carry a cytokine to targeted cells

== Books ==
- Ralph Weichselbaum; et al. (2006). Holland-Frei Cancer medicine. Elsevier: B.C. Decker.
- Ralph Weichselbaum; et al. (2002). Cancer of the upper gastrointestinal tract. Hamilton: B.C. Decker.
- Ralph Weichselbaum; et al. (2000). Cancer Medicine. Hamilton: B.C. Decker.
- Ralph Weichselbaum; et al. (1980). Advances regarding the pathogenesis and treatment of ocular tumors. Boston: Little, Brown.
