= Flaura K. Winston =

- Born: Pikesville, Maryland, US
- Spouse: Ira Winston (m. 1983)

Academic background
- Education: BSE, 1983, MSE, Bioengineering, University of Pennsylvania; PhD, Bioengineering, University of Pennsylvania School of Engineering and Applied Science; University of Pennsylvania; MD, Perelman School of Medicine at the University of Pennsylvania
- Thesis: The modulation of intracellular free calcium concentration by biaxial extensional strains of bovine pulmonary artery endothelial cells (1989)

Flaura Ann Koplin Winston is an American pediatrician and engineer. She was one of the first to identify the first case of airbag-associated child death and her research and advocacy have led to drafting new federal airbag policies.

== Early life and education ==
Winston was born to Arthur Koplin in Pikesville, Maryland. She completed her Medical degree at the University of Pennsylvania School of Engineering and Applied Science and her Master's degree in Bioengineering from University of Pennsylvania. Winston remained at the school for her PhD in Bioengineering from the University of Pennsylvania School of Engineering and Applied Science.

== Career ==
Following her residency and fellowship, Winston joined the faculty of the University of Pennsylvania. While there, Winston was one of the first researchers to point out that airbags were killing children. In 1998, she created the Partners for Child Passenger Safety, which has collected information on 173,000 crashes involving more than 260,000 children. The aim of the project was to collect data on child passenger injuries, providing information to both vehicle manufacturers and legislative bodies. In the late 1990s, Winston received an $8.7 million grant from State Farm Insurance to examine data from 28,000 car crashes in 15 states.

As an assistant professor of pediatrics, Winston was the co-recipient of the 1995 American Society of Mechanical Engineers' Melville Medal for her paper "An Analysis of the Time-Dependent Changes in Intracellular Calcium Concentration in Endothelial Cells in Culture Induced by Mechanical Stimulation." She also founded and directed TraumaLink at Children's Hospital of Philadelphia (CHOP). The aim of TraumaLink was to focus on all phases of an injury in order to identify modifiable risk factors for poor injury outcome. As a result of her "biomechanical and psychological foundation of pediatric trauma prevention and treatment," Winston was the recipient of the 2003 Judson Daland Prize from the American Philosophical Society.

Upon being promoted to the rank of associate professor of Pediatrics Winston was awarded the 2007 John M. Eisenberg Patient Safety and Quality Award by the National Quality Forum and the Joint Commission. She was honored for her "commitment to combining biomechanical engineering, public health, and psychologic methodologies to promote safety and prevent injury among children from motor vehicle crashes." She was also elected a Fellow of the American Institute for Medical and Biological Engineering in 2011 for her "visionary leadership as both pediatrician and engineer in clinical research, practice, and training for the prevention of child injury."

Throughout her tenure at UPenn, Winston was appointed to the Distinguished Chair in the Department of Pediatrics at CHOP and as the Scientific Director of the National Science Foundation Center for Child Injury Prevention Studies. In 2017, she was elected a member of the National Academy of Medicine In 2019, Winston was awarded an Honorary Fellowship from the Royal College of Physicians of Ireland. During the COVID-19 pandemic, Winston received the 2021 Association for Clinical and Translational Science Distinguished Investigator Award for Translation from Clinical Use into Public Benefit and Policy.

== Personal life ==
Winston and her husband Ira have two children together. Winston gave birth to her son a few weeks before getting her engineering degree and the department had a calligrapher make him a diploma for graduation.
