= Gail H. Cassell =

American microbiologist

- Education: University of Alabama at Tuscaloosa; University of Alabama at Birmingham
- Scientific career
- Fields: Microbiology, mycoplasma, multidrug-resistant tuberculosis
- Workplaces: University of Alabama at Birmingham; Eli Lilly and Company; Infectious Disease Research Institute
- Doctoral advisor: Richard B. Johnston

Gail Houston Cassell is an American microbiologist whose research focuses on Mycoplasma species and multidrug-resistant tuberculosis. She is vice president of TB drug development at the Infectious Disease Research Institute. In 1994 she was the president of the American Society for Microbiology (ASM).

== Life ==
Cassell completed a undergraduate degree at the University of Alabama at Tuscaloosa. She earned a M.S. and Ph.D. in microbiology at the University of Alabama at Birmingham (UAB). Her 1973 dissertation was titled Experimental mycoplasma pulmonis infection in pathogen-free mice: pathogensis and immune response. Richard B. Johnston was her doctoral advisor. By 1973, she was married to Ralph Cassell.

She began her research and teaching career at UAB in 1973 as an assistant professor in the department of comparative medicine. She was named Charles H. McCauley professor of microbiology in 1994 and served as chair of the department of microbiology from 1987 to 1997 and as of 2003 is a professor emerita. By 2003, she was also professor in the department of pediatrics and the department of comparative medicine. She was a senior scientist at UAB's center for AIDS research, cystic fibrosis center, and multipurpose arthritis center. Cassell joined Eli Lilly and Company in 1997 as vice president of infectious disease research. In 2002, she was promoted to vice president for scientific affairs and distinguished Lilly research scholar for infectious diseases. She is an elected member of the Institute of Medicine. Cassell became a senior lecturer on global health and social medicine at the Harvard Medical School. She is vice president for TB drug development at the Infectious Disease Research Institute.
