= W. Thomas Boyce =

American pediatrician

W. Thomas Boyce is an American pediatrician. He is professor emeritus of pediatrics and psychiatry at the University of California, San Francisco, where he formerly served as Lisa and John Pritzker Distinguished Professor of Developmental and Behavioral Health. He previously taught at the University of California, Berkeley and at the University of British Columbia. He is the author of the book The Orchid and the Dandelion: Why Some Children Struggle and How All Can Thrive, which was published in 2019.

== Honors and awards ==
In 2011, Boyce was elected to the Institute of Medicine. In 2015, he received the Distinguished Contributions to Interdisciplinary Understanding of Child Development Award from the Society for Research in Child Development. In 2018, he received the Whole Child Award from the Simms/Mann Institute.
