= Richard L. Wahl =

- Occupation: physician
- Known for: PET/CT medical research

Richard L. Wahl, a nuclear medicine physician, is the Elizabeth Mallinckrodt Professor and Chairman of Radiology, and Director of the Mallinckrodt Institute of Radiology at Washington University School of Medicine. He is known for his work in PET/CT imaging.

== Early life and education ==
Wahl attended Washington University in St. Louis for medical school, then did residency training at the University of Michigan.

== Career ==
Wahl subsequently went on to become the Director, Division of Nuclear Medicine/PET at Johns Hopkins University. In 2003, he was the first recipient of the Henry N. Wagner Professorship in Nuclear Medicine at Hopkins.

== Medical research ==
Wahl is known for his extensive research in molecular imaging with positron emission tomography (PET) and hybrid PET/CT imaging. He was the editor of one of the early textbooks in PET/CT Imaging.
