= Nancy Ascher =

American organ transplant surgeon

Nancy L. Ascher
- Education: University of Michigan
- Occupation: Surgeon
- Spouse: John Roberts
- Awards: Holly Smith Award for Exceptional Service

Nancy L. Ascher is an American surgeon, and the first woman to perform a liver transplant. Ascher specializes in transplant surgery, focusing on end-stage kidney disease, kidney transplantation, non-alcoholic fatty liver disease and liver transplantation.

== Biography ==
Ascher is from Detroit, Michigan and is the third child of four. Her mother was a teacher and her father was a doctor who both placed a strong emphasis on serving the community. Consequently, as a young child, she had originally aspired to become a nun, but as her background is Jewish, she instead pursued studies in medicine.

Ascher completed her undergraduate and medical education at the University of Michigan. Ascher was one of only 20 women in a cohort of 220 students and was one of two women to pursue surgery. When she applied to medical school, she was asked to have an additional interview with a psychiatrist who asked inappropriate questions about her sex life.

In an interview, she recalled how one Professor of Obstetrics and Gynecology showed pictures of naked women during his class, during which the female students stood up and left.

She then went on to complete a general surgery residency and clinical transplantation fellowship at the University of Minnesota.

Ascher joined the faculty of the Department of Surgery at the University of Minnesota in 1982 and was named Clinical Director of the Liver Transplant Program. In 1988 she was recruited by the University of California, San Francisco (UCSF) Department of Surgery to build a liver transplantation program. In 1991, she was appointed Chief of Transplantation, an expanded role that included liver, kidney and pancreas transplants.

In 1993, Ascher was appointed Vice-Chair of the UCSF Department of Surgery, and in 1999 was appointed Department Chair where she served until September 2016. Ascher has continued to work with the UCSF.

She has been a member of the Presidential Task Force on Organ Transplantation, the Surgeon General's Task Force on Increasing Donor Organs and the Secretary of Health and Human Services Advisory Committee on Open Transplantation. She was also invited to join the WHO Task Force on Donation and Transplantation of Human Organs and Tissues, which she joined as a member in 2018.

== Awards ==
Ascher is the recipient of the Holly Smith Award for Exceptional Service for 2020. She was described by the award committee as a 'lighthouse of possibility' and that 'watching Nancy perform the most demanding of surgical operations is a never-ending source of inspiration.'

== Select publications ==
- Wachs, Michael E., et al. "The risk of transmission of hepatitis B from HBsAg (-), HBcAb (+), HBIgM (-) organ donors." Transplantation 59.2 (1995): 230-233.
- Emond, Jean C., et al. "Functional analysis of grafts from living donors. Implications for the treatment of older recipients." Annals of surgery 224.4 (1996): 544.
- Yao, Francis Y., et al. "Liver transplantation for hepatocellular carcinoma: expansion of the tumor size limits does not adversely impact survival." Hepatology 33.6 (2001): 1394-1403.
- Yao, Francis Y., et al. "Liver transplantation for hepatocellular carcinoma: analysis of survival according to the intention-to-treat principle and dropout from the waiting list." Liver Transplantation 8.10 (2002): 873-883.
- Yao, Francis Y., et al. "Excellent outcome following down‐staging of hepatocellular carcinoma prior to liver transplantation: an intention‐to‐treat analysis." Hepatology 48.3 (2008): 819-827.
- Lebares, Carter C., et al. "Burnout and stress among US surgery residents: psychological distress and resilience." Journal of the American College of Surgeons 226.1 (2018): 80-90.

== Media ==
Ascher and her pioneering work in organ transplantation was the focus of the third episode of Netflix’s docuseries ‘The Surgeon’s Cut' which was released in December 2020. The episode focusses on the case of Maria, a patient with a nonalcoholic steatohepatitis and her 22 year old daughter Adriana. Ascher performed the removal in parts of Adriana's liver while her husband re-implanted the donor liver into Maria.

== Personal life ==
Ascher is married to fellow surgeon John Roberts - who was originally her student - and with whom she performed the first-ever live adult-to-child liver transplant that occurred at the University of California, San Francisco, in 1993.

She has two children; during both pregnancies, she went into labor while operating. Ascher gave a kidney to her sister, who died three years after the operation.

Ascher has noted that her desire to work in medicine stemmed from a love of horror films - which showed her how to overcome her fears within her job. Ascher was heavily influenced in her early career by the feminist movement.
