= Eugenia South =

American physician

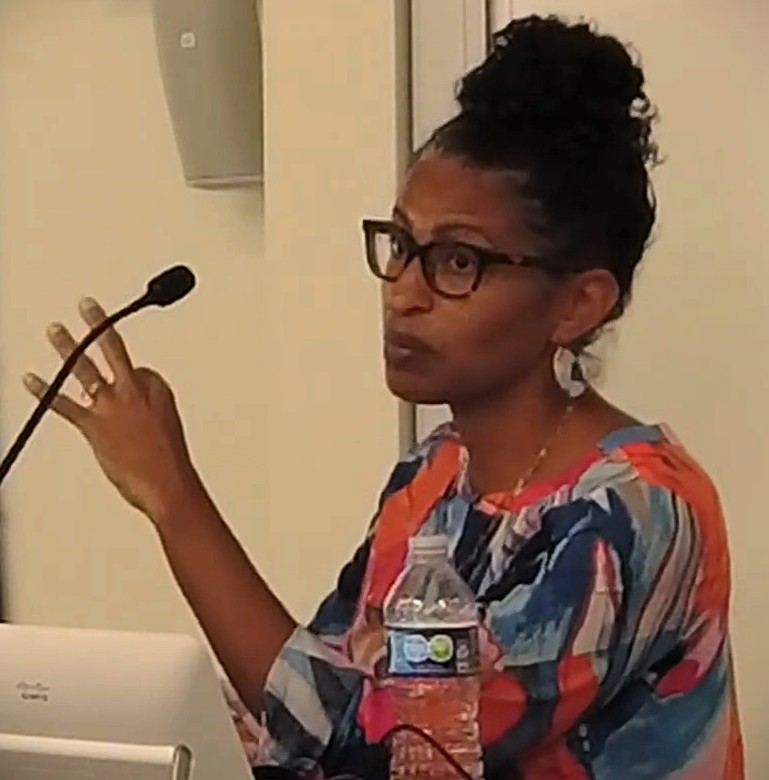
- South speaks in 2022
- Education: University of Pennsylvania; Perelman School of Medicine
- Scientific career
- Workplaces: Harvard University; Washington University in St. Louis; University of Pennsylvania

Eugenia South is an American physician who is Professor of Emergency Medicine and Director of the Center for Health Justice at the Perelman School of Medicine. Her research looks to understand how neighborhoods impact health and safety in urban environments. She has demonstrated that people are safer after "community greening" programs (i.e., introducing gardens and parks), showing they reduce violent crime and improve mental health. She was elected Fellow of the National Academy of Medicine in 2024.

== Early life and education ==
South completed her undergraduate studies at Harvard University. She moved to Washington University in St. Louis for her medical studies, and completed a Masters of Public Health at the University of Pennsylvania.

== Research and career ==
At the Perelman School of Medicine, South investigated health disparities in urban neighborhoods. Much of America still lives in racially segregated neighbourhoods, where environmental factors have poor implications for public health. South led a trial of greening vacant spaces, introducing parks, planting hundreds of trees and instituting weekly trash clean ups. She worked with the Pennsylvania Horticultural Society to pilot a randomized controlled trial. South showed that greening was protective against gun violence, reduced heart rates, and improved both mental health and cardiovascular outcomes in pregnant people. South and colleagues from the Perelman School of Medicine were awarded $10m from the National Institutes of Health to study structural inequity in health care. She is investigating how remediating abandoned buildings impacts chronic stress.

South is Faculty Director of the Penn Medicine Center for Health Justice and the Urban Health Lab. The center has three main activities: research, community action and health system transformation.

South was named vice president for Health Justice in 2023 and elected Fellow of the National Academy of Medicine in 2024.

== Awards and honors ==
- 2024 Fellow of the National Academy of Medicine

== Selected publications ==
- Charles C Branas; Eugenia South; Michelle C Kondo; Bernadette C Hohl; Philippe Bourgois; Douglas J Wiebe; John M MacDonald (26 February 2018). "Citywide cluster randomized trial to restore blighted vacant land and its effects on violence, crime, and fear". Proceedings of the National Academy of Sciences of the United States of America. 115 (12): 2946–2951. Bibcode:2018PNAS..115.2946B. doi:10.1073/pnas.1718503115. ISSN 0027-8424. PMC 5866574. PMID 29483246. Wikidata Q52684432.
- Eugenia C Garvin; Carolyn C Cannuscio; Charles C Branas (7 August 2012). "Greening vacant lots to reduce violent crime: a randomised controlled trial". Injury Prevention. 19 (3): 198–203. doi:10.1136/injuryprev-2012-040439. ISSN 1353-8047. PMC 3988203. PMID 22871378. Wikidata Q37705144.
- Charles C Branas; Eugenia South; Michelle C Kondo; Bernadette C Hohl; Philippe Bourgois; Douglas J Wiebe; John M MacDonald (26 February 2018). "Citywide cluster randomized trial to restore blighted vacant land and its effects on violence, crime, and fear". Proceedings of the National Academy of Sciences of the United States of America. 115 (12): 2946–2951. Bibcode:2018PNAS..115.2946B. doi:10.1073/pnas.1718503115. ISSN 0027-8424. PMC 5866574. PMID 29483246. Wikidata Q52684432.
