= Regan Bailey =

American nutritional epidemiologist

Academic background
- Education: B.S., Applied Nutrition, 1998, Pennsylvania State University; MS, Food and Nutrition, 2001, Indiana University of Pennsylvania; PhD, Nutritional Sciences, 2007, Pennsylvania State University; MPH, Public Health and Epidemiology, 2014, Johns Hopkins University
- Thesis: Development and Validation of a Dietary Screening Tool for Older Adults (2007)

Academic work
- Institutions: Florida State University, Purdue University; National Institutes of Health Office of Dietary Supplements

Regan Lucas Bailey is an American nutritional epidemiologist and a Professor at Florida State University.

== Early life and education ==
Bailey earned her Bachelor of Science degree and PhD from Pennsylvania State University while enrolling at Indiana University of Pennsylvania for her Master's of Science degree.

Bailey has 3 children, Savannah, Benner, Elliot. Bailey is married to Weston Schempf.

== Career ==
After earning her PhD, Bailey accepted a position as director of career development and outreach at the National Institutes of Health Office of Dietary Supplements. She left the organization in 2013 to become an adjunct faculty member at Purdue University. In this role, she also completed her Master's of Public Health at Johns Hopkins University.

While at Purdue, Bailey leads a laboratory which focused on "understanding how to use dietary intakes, dietary patterns, and biomarkers of nutritional status to assess how dietary exposure relates to human health across the lifecourse." In 2017, Bailey was designated a Showalter Faculty Scholar for her research into diet and disease.

In 2019, Bailey was named to United States Department of Agriculture and United States Department of Health and Human Services' 2020 Dietary Guidelines Advisory Committee. As an associate professor in nutrition science, she led a study titled Estimation of Total Usual Dietary Intakes of Pregnant Women in the United States, which found that pregnant women were not getting the proper amounts of some vitamins and minerals while also consuming excessive amounts of sodium. Bailey also published the findings from her study "Feeding Infants and Toddler Study 2016" which found that 20 per cent of infants had a low intake of iron. She was subsequently promoted to the rank of Full professor in May 2019.

In 2020, Bailey was elected a Member of the National Academy of Medicine for her "work on measuring nutritional status to optimize health."
