= Timothy Billiar =

Professor of Surgery at University of Pittsburgh

Timothy R. Billiar is an American surgeon currently the George Vance Foster Endowed Professor and Distinguished Professor of Surgery at University of Pittsburgh. His current research includes immune, cell and organ biology.
