= Teri A. Reynolds =

American physician

- Citizenship: American
- Medical career
- Profession: Physician Scientist
- Institutions: World Health Organization
- Research: Emergency medicine

Teri A. Reynolds MD, MS is a scientist for the Department for Management of Noncommunicable Diseases, Disability, Violence and Injury Prevention at the World Health Organization who leads the emergency and trauma care program.

== Education ==
Reynolds attended Columbia University for her undergraduate studies on a full scholarship. While in college, she became an emergency medical technician. She then went to University of California, San Francisco School of Medicine to earn her M.D. degree and a master's degree in Global Health.

== Career ==
When she joined the WHO in May 2015, she became the first appointment at the World Health Organization in the discipline of Emergency Medicine. The emergency, trauma and acute care program she leads is to provide the technical resources countries need to strengthen emergency care affordably

=== Research ===
She is a leader in the development of emergency care systems in Africa.

== Honours ==
In 2023, Reynolds was elected to the National Academy of Medicine.
