= Margaret P. Moss =

Native American Nurse and Juris Doctor (JD)

Margaret Priscilla Moss
- Born: April 20, 1957 (age 69); Fargo, North Dakota
- Occupations: Author, Editor, Professor, Nurse
- Spouse: Willie Moss (1986-)
- Children: 4

Margaret P. Moss, PhD, JD, RN, FAAN, an enrolled member of the Three Affiliated Tribes is Assistant Dean of Diversity and Inclusion/Associate Professor at the University at Buffalo, School of Nursing. She is the first and only American Indian to hold both nursing and juris doctorates. As a RWJF Health Policy Fellow she staffed the US Senate Special Committee on Aging (2008-9) and was lead staff on the now enacted National Alzheimer's Project Act. Moss recently published the first nursing textbook on American Indian health (Springer 2015), which won AJN Book of the Year in 2016.

== Career ==
Moss earned her PhD in nursing from the University of Texas Health Science Center at Houston (UTHealth) and her JD from Hamline University School of Law in St Paul, MN. She was a tenured faculty (2006) during her time at the University of Minnesota 2000–2010. Moss’ clinical experience, included being staff nurse and then House Supervisor and Patient Education Specialist at the US Public Health Service, Indian Health Service/ Santa Fe Indian Hospital (1991–1996). Her research methods have included ethnography, geographical information systems, survey, and other qualitative methods. Moss has published papers primarily focused on American Indian Elders, Zuni Elders & Aging, Migration & Re-Migration of Am Indians and the Impact on Elders.

She was a 2014 Fulbright Visiting Research Chair in Aboriginal/Indigenous Life and Culture in the North American Context at McGill University, Montreal, QC (2014) where she analyzed Canadian Census and Health laws and the resulting deficits for indigenous health outcomes. Moss was on faculty at Yale University (2010–2015) where she directed both the Masters and Doctoral programs on leadership and Policy.

== Personal life ==
In 1986, she married Willie Moss in Beaverton, Oregon. Together they have four children.
