= Sharon M. Donovan =

American dietitian

- Spouse: Don

Academic background
- Education: BS, 1983, PhD, 1988, University of California, Davis
- Thesis: Characterization of the non-protein nitrogen in human milk and availability of urea nitrogen for the premature infant (1988)

Academic work
- Institutions: University of Illinois at Urbana–Champaign

Sharon Marie Donovan is an American dietitian. She holds the Melissa M. Noel Endowed Chair in Nutrition and Health at the University of Illinois at Urbana–Champaign and heads the Donovan Lab. In 2017, she was elected a member of the National Academy of Medicine.

== Early life and education ==
Donovan earned her Bachelor of Science degree and PhD from the University of California, Davis (UC Davis) and completed her Postdoctoral Fellowship at the Stanford University School of Medicine. She began studying zoology at UC Davis, but was inspired by Richard Freedland to study nutritional biochemistry.

== Career ==
Upon completing her Postdoctoral Fellowship, Donovan began working as an assistant professor of Nutrition at the University of Illinois at Urbana–Champaign from 1991 until 1997. She was promoted to Full Professor in 2001. She served as the director of the Division of Nutritional Sciences Graduate Program at Illinois from 1999 until 2009. In 2003, she was appointed the inaugural Melissa M. Noel Chair in Nutrition and Health in the Department of Food Science and Human Nutrition. While serving in this role, Donovan heads the Donovan Lab, which conducts work in the area of Pediatric Nutrition. She served as the President of the American Society of Nutrition from 2011 to 2012 and of the International Society for Research on Human Milk and Lactation from 2018 to 2020.

In 2017, Donovan was elected a member of the National Academy of Medicine as someone who has "demonstrated outstanding professional achievements and commitment to service." A few years later, Secretary of Agriculture Sonny Perdue and United States Secretary of Health and Human Services Alex Azar appointed her to sit on the 2020 Dietary Guidelines Advisory Committee. During the COVID-19 pandemic in North America, Donovan was appointed the director of the institutions newly established Personalized Nutrition Initiative (PNI). In this role, she said she "envisions the PNI building transdisciplinary collaborative efforts across campus to answer fundamental questions regarding how nutrition modulates health and disease across the lifespan." Following this appointment, Donovan was named a permanent faculty member of the Center for Advanced Study at the University of Illinois.
