= Richard A. Smith (physician) =

American physician

- Born: October 13, 1932; Norwalk, Connecticut
- Died: March 10, 2017 (aged 84)
- Education: Howard University

Richard A. Smith (1932–2017) was an American physician who was part of the five-person team composing the Surgeon General's Office of Equal Health Opportunity (OEHO), which was charged with desegregating US hospitals in the mid-1960s. Smith developed one of the first Physician Assistant (PA) training programs in the US, MEDEX, and later founded MEDEX International.

== Early life and education ==
Smith obtained a BS and an MD from Howard University in 1953 and 1957, respectively. He completed his residency in public health and preventive medicine at the University of Washington. Smith obtained an MPH from Columbia University in 1960.

== Awards and honors ==
Smith was elected into the National Academy of Medicine in 1972. He received a Rockefeller Public Service Award in 1981 "for developing new methods of health care" and a Retired Commissioned Officers Recognition Award from the US Public Health Service in 1999.

== Select publications ==
- Smith, Richard A.; Banta, James E. (1969). "Global community health--a "new" health direction". American Journal of Public Health and the Nation's Health. 59 (9): 1713–1719. doi:10.2105/ajph.59.9.1713. PMC 1226687. PMID 5817612.
- Smith, Richard A. (1970). "MEDEX". JAMA. 211 (11): 1843–1845. doi:10.1001/jama.1970.03170110049010. PMID 5467112.
