= Mary D'Alton =

American gynecologist

- Spouse: Richard L. Berkowitz
- Children: 3

Academic background
- Education: M.B.B.C.h, 1976, National University of Ireland

Academic work
- Institutions: Columbia University

Mary E. D'Alton is an American gynecologist. She was the Chair of the Department of Obstetrics and Gynecology and the Willard C. Rappleye Professor of Obstetrics and Gynecology at Columbia University Irving Medical Center until stepping down in disgrace after allowing Robert Hadden to continue to practice gynecology at Columbia even though he had already been arrested for sexual assault including licking a patient’s vagina during a medical exam.

== Early life and education ==
D’Alton completed her M.B.B.C.h. at the National University of Ireland before moving to North American to complete a residency in obstetrics and gynecology at Ottawa General Hospital, Yale New Haven Hospital, and Tufts Medical Center.

== Career ==
D’Alton joined Columbia University in 1999 as the Virgil G. Damon Professor of Obstetrics and Gynecology and director of the division of Maternal Fetal Medicine. In 2005, she was appointed the director of the Obstetrical and Gynecological Service at Columbia Presbyterian Medical Center at NewYork-Presbyterian Hospital. In these roles, she helped develop a new screening test to provide a more accurate predictor for Down syndrome in the first trimester of pregnancy.

As a result of her research, D'Alton was elected a member of the National Academy of Medicine (then referred to as the Institute of Medicine) in 2013. She later earned the Seymour Milstein Distinguished Service Award as "a senior member of the medical staff at NYP/CUIMC and Columbia University Vagelos College of Physicians and Surgeons (VP&S) for exceptional and long-standing service." During the COVID-19 pandemic, D'Alton co-authored numerous publications on the coronavirus.

== Personal life ==
D'Alton is married to Richard L. Berkowitz.
