= Pamela B. Davis =

American pediatric pulmonologist

- Education: Duke University
- Occupations: physician, scientist, medical education
- Awards: Rosenthal Prize, Paul Di Sant'Agnese Award

Pamela B. Davis is a pediatric pulmonologist specializing in cystic fibrosis research. She has been Dean of the School of Medicine at Case Western Reserve University since 2007. She was elected to the Institute of Medicine in 2014.
