= David DeMets =

American biostatistician (born 1944)

David L. DeMets (born 27 November 1944) is an American biostatistician.

DeMets earned a doctorate in biostatistics from the University of Minnesota in 1970, and completed his postdoctoral research at the National Institutes of Health in 1972, then joined the University of Wisconsin–Madison faculty in 1972. He was later named Max Halperin Professor of Biostatistics, and awarded emeritus status upon retirement in 2017.

DeMets was elected a fellow of the American Statistical Association in 1986, a fellow of the American Association for the Advancement of Science in 1998, and a member of the Institute of Medicine in 2013.
