= William M. Sage =

American lawyer

William M. Sage is an American lawyer, specializing in health and public law, currently the James R. Dougherty Chair for Faculty Excellence at University of Texas School of Law, University of Texas at Austin.
