= MedInfo =

MedInfo is the name of the international medical informatics conference organized initially every 3 years and now every other year by the International Medical Informatics Association. It is the most important international conference in the field with health and medical informatics professions attending from all over the world. MedInfo also serves to bring together all officers of the International Medical Informatics Association (IMIA) Board together with national representatives in the General Assembly of IMIA.

The General Assembly elects the officers of IMIA. The IMIA Board consists of the President (the Past or the Elect President), Treasurer and Secretary as its officers. In addition it has other Vice Presidents for targeted areas: Membership, MedInfo, Services, Special Affairs, Strategic Plan Implementation, and Working Groups. With the exception of the President and the Vice President of MedInfo all officers serve a three-year term that can be extended for a second three-year term. The President and Vice President are on a two - year term and the Vice President of MedInfo has one 2-year term and is elected the year before the next Medinfo meeting so that he/she can be mentored through one MedInfo cycle.

== MedInfo conferences ==
MedInfo was held every 3 years since its inception in 1974, after 2013 it is now held every two years. The table below gives an overview of these conferences.

Number	Year	Date	Location	Organizing Partner	Organizing Committee Chair(s)	Scientific Program Committee Chair(s)	Editorial Committee
1	1974	Aug 5-10	Stockholm, Sweden	IFIP World Congress		Francois Grémy	John Anderson, J. Malcolm Forsythe
2	1977	Aug 8-12	Toronto, Canada	IFIP TC-4 Meeting	Werner Schneider		David B. Shires, Hermann K. Wolf
3	1980	Sep 29-Oct 4	Tokyo, Japan		Masamitsu Oshima	Morris F. Collen	Donald A. B. Lindberg, Shigekoto Kaihara
4	1983	Aug 22-27	Amsterdam, the Netherlands		Jan Roukens	Gwilym S. Lodwick	Jan Hendrik van Bemmel, Marion J. Ball, Ove Wigertz
5	1986	Oct 26-30	Washington DC, USA	American Medical Informatics Association (AMIA)	Donald A. B. Lindberg	Jan van Bemmel, Edward H. Shortliffe	Roger Salamon, Bruce I. Blum, Mogens Jørgensen
6	1989	Oct 17–20, Dec 11-15	Beijing, China and Singapore		K. C. Lun		Barry Barber, Dexian Cao, Dulie Qin, Gustav Wagner
7	1992	Sep 6-10	Geneva, Switzerland	Swiss Society for Medical Informatics	Jean-Raoul Scherrer	Salah Mandil	K. C. Lun, Patrice Degoulet, Thomas E. Piemme, Otto Rienhoff
8	1995	July 23–27	Vancouver, Canada	Canada's Health Informatics Association	Kathryn Hannah	Shigekoto Kaihara	Robert A. Greenes, Hans E. Petersen, Denis J. Protti
9	1998	Aug 14-21	Seoul, South Korea	Korean Society of Medical Informatics	Chang Soon Koh	Charles Safran, Patrice Degoulet	Branko Cesnik, Alexa Thorlichen McCray, Jean-Raoul Scherrer
10	2001	Sep 2-5	London, UK	British Computer Society Health Informatics Forum	Jean Roberts	Arie Hasman, Hiroshi Takeda	Vimla L. Patel, Ray Rogers, Reinhold Haux, Beatriz de Faria Leão
11	2004	Sep 7-11	San Francisco, USA	American Medical Informatics Association (AMIA)	Edward H. Shortliffe	Mario Stefanelli, Casimir Kulikowski	Marius Fieschi, Enrico Coiera, Yu-Chan Jack Li
12	2007	Aug 20–24	Brisbane, Australia	Health Informatics Society of Australia	Evelyn J.S. Hovenga	Alexa T. McCray, Heimar de Fátima Marin	Klaus. A. Kuhn, James R. Warren, Tze-Yun Leong
13	2010	Sep 13-16	Cape Town, South Africa	South African Health Informatics Association	Lyn Hanmer	Riccardo Bellazzi, Johanna Westbrook	Charles Safran, Heimar de Fátima Marin, Shane Reti
14	2013	Aug 20–23	Copenhagen, Denmark	Danish Society of Medical Informatics (DSMI)	Lene Vistisen (Denmark)	Dominik Aronsky (Switzerland), Tze‐Yun Leong (Singapore)	Christoph U. Lehmann (US, chair), Christian Nøhr (Denmark), Elske Ammenwerth (Austria)
15	2015	Aug 19-23	São Paulo, Brasil	Brazilian Society of Health Informatics (SBIS)	Beatriz de Faria Leão (Brazil), Claudio Giulliano Alves da Costa (Brazil)	Fernando Martin Sanchez (Australia), Kaija Saranto (Finland)	Indra Neil Sarkar (US, chair), Paulo Mazzoncini de Azevedo Marques (Brazil), Andrew Georgiou (Australia)
16	2017	Aug 21-25	Hangzhou, China	China Medical Informatics Association (CMIA)	Yongqin Huang, Chair (China), Yining Meng, Executive Vice Chair (China)	Elizabeth Borycki (Canada), Niels Peek (United Kingdom)	Adi Gunlapalli (US, chair), Dongsheng Zhao (China) and Marie-Christine Jaulent (France)
17	2019	Aug 26-30	Lyon, France	French Association for Medical Informatics (AIM)	Jean-Marie Rodrigues, President (France), Phillipe Cinquin, Deputy Executive President, Lemlih Ouchchane, General Secretary, Daniel Pagonis, Treasurer Patrick Weber, VP MedInfo (Switzerland, IMIA Board)	Olivier Bodenreider (U.S.A., Co-chair), Michael Marscholleck (Germany, Co-chair)	Lucila Ohno-Macado (U.S.A., chair), Brigitte Séroussi (France, Vice Chair)
18	2023	July 8–12	Sydney, Australia	Health Informatics Society of Australia (HISA)	Najeeb Al-Shorbaji, VP MedInfo (Jordon, IMIA Board)	Paul Otero (Co-chair, Argentina), Philip Scott (Co-chair, United Kingdom)	Jennifer Bichel-Findlay (Australia, Co-chair)
20	2025	August	Taipei, Taiwan	Taiwan Association for Medical Informatics (TAMI)			

== Other definitions ==
MedInfo is also an acronym for Medical Informatics

== See also ==
- International Medical Informatics Association
