= List of medical and health informatics journals =

This is a list of notable journals related to medical and health informatics.

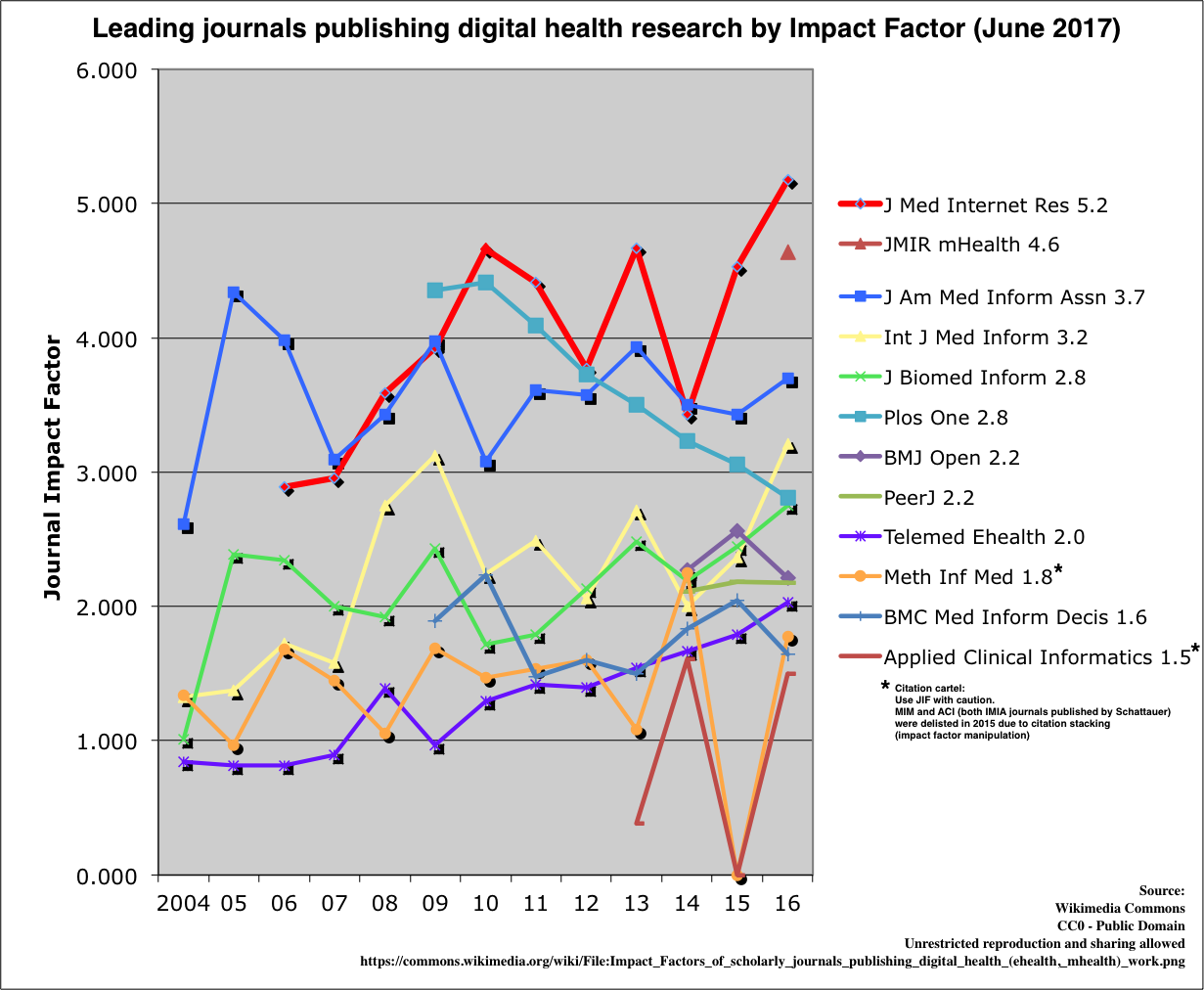
Impact Factors of scholarly journals publishing digital health (ehealth, mhealth) work

- BMC Medical Informatics and Decision Making
- BMJ Health & Care Informatics
- Computers in Biology and Medicine
- Health Informatics Journal
- International Journal of Medical Informatics
- Journal of the American Medical Informatics Association
- Journal of Biomedical Informatics
- Journal of Information Professionals in Health
- Journal of Innovation in Health Informatics
- Journal of Medical Internet Research
- Medical & Biological Engineering & Computing
- Methods of Information in Medicine
- PLOS Digital Health
- Statistics in Medicine

== See also ==
- List of medical journals
- Lists of academic journals
