= Charles Safran =

American physician

- Born: February 3, 1951 (age 75); New York City, New York
- Education: Tufts University
- Occupations: Former Chief Division of Clinical Informatics, Beth Israel Deaconess Medical Center; Professor of Medicine Harvard Medical School
- Known for: Electronic medical records, clinical decision support system, health information technology

Charles Safran (born February 3, 1951) is an American physician and biomedical informatician. He is professor emeritus of medicine at Harvard Medical School and has been affiliated with Beth Israel Deaconess Medical Center (BIDMC). His work has focused on clinical informatics, electronic health records, clinical decision-support systems, and the use of information technology in health care.

== Early life and education ==
Safran was born in New York City and grew up in Metuchen, New Jersey.

Safran earned his Bachelor of Science degree in mathematics and Masters of Science degree in mathematical logic at Tufts University in 1974. He received an M.D. from Tufts University in 1980. His postdoctoral training included an internship and residency in internal medicine at the Boston Veterans Administration Medical Center from 1980 to 1983.

== Career ==
From 1973 to 1976, Safran worked as a programmer for the Sponsored Research Staff at the Massachusetts Institute of Technology's Laboratory for Computer Science, where he worked with G. Anthony Gorry. His early work applied decision theory to the selection of diagnostic tests and treatments for patients with Hodgkin's disease. This work resulted in his first publication, Decision analysis to evaluate lymphangiography in the management of patients with Hodgkin's disease.

Safran was recruited to Harvard Medical School to work with Drs. Warner V. Slack and Howard L. Bleich, where he contributed to the institution's clinical computing systems, medical informatics education and research programs. He is the professor of medicine since 2015. At Beth Israel Deaconess Medical Center, he served as a physician and former chief of the Division of Clinical Informatics, influencing medical informatics education and research while directing research programs and leading clinical computing fellowships.

In 2004, Safran was elected president of the American Medical Informatics Association (AMIA).

He has over 200 peer-reviewed publications with over 10,000 citations and speaks to national and international audiences. He was the Scientific Program Committee Chair of MedInfo 98, which was the 9th World Congress on Medical Informatics held in Seoul, South Korea, from August 14–21, 1998. In 2003 as VP of IMIA, he organized the HELINA (Health Informatics in Africa) Conference focused on the use of information and communication technology in the fight against HIV/AIDS in Africa. In 2012, he chaired the European Summit on Trustworthy Reuse of Health Data.

== Research ==
Safran's research has examined clinical information systems, electronic medical records, clinical decision support, telemedicine, and the secondary use of health data. His early research applied computer-based decision analysis to medical diagnosis and treatment. His subsequent work addressed the development and evaluation of integrated clinical information systems and electronic medical records.

He Led the development of Baby CareLink, an Internet-based telemedicine system designed to support families of infants receiving neonatal intensive care, and Pediatric Cancer CareLink, which provided information and support for the home management of children with leukemia.

== Awards and honors ==
Safran was elected to the American College of Medical Informatics in 1990. He received an AMIA President's Award in 2001 for his contributions to the association and the field of medical informatics.

In 2013, Safran received the Don Eugene Detmer Award for Health Policy Contributions in Informatics from AMIA. In 2014, he received the Morris F. Collen Award of Excellence.

In 2025, Safran received the François Grémy Award from the International Medical Informatics Association for lifetime contributions to medical informatics through research, education, and development.
