= International Journal of Medical Informatics =

- Discipline: Health informatics
- Language: English
- Edited by: Heimar de Fátima Marin

Publication details
- Former name(s): International Journal of Bio-Medical Computing
- History: 1970–present
- Publisher: Elsevier
- Frequency: Monthly
- Impact factor: 4.046 (2020)

Standard abbreviations
- ISO 4: Int. J. Med. Inform.

Indexing
- ISSN: 1386-5056 (print); 1872-8243 (web)
- LCCN: sn97-42548
- OCLC no.: 639065096

Links
- Journal homepage; Online archive

The International Journal of Medical Informatics is a monthly peer-reviewed medical journal covering health informatics. It was established in 1970 as the International Journal of Bio-Medical Computing, obtaining its current name in 1997. It is published by Elsevier on behalf of both the European Federation for Medical Informatics and the International Medical Informatics Association, and is the official journal of both societies. The editor-in-chief is Heimar de Fátima Marin (Federal University of São Paulo). According to the Journal Citation Reports, the journal has a 2020 impact factor of 4.046.
