= Ledley =

Ledley is a name shared by the following people:

- Joe Ledley, a Welsh footballer
- Ledley King, an English footballer
- Robert Ledley, a United States computer specialist.
