= Methods of Information in Medicine =

- Discipline: Medical informatics
- Language: English
- Edited by: Sabine Koch

Publication details
- Former name(s): Medical documentation, Medizinische Dokumentation, Dokumentation in Medizin und Biologie
- History: 1962-present
- Publisher: Schattauer Publishers
- Frequency: Bimonthly
- Impact factor: 1.5 (2017)

Standard abbreviations
- ISO 4: Methods Inf. Med.

Indexing
- CODEN: MIMCAI
- ISSN: 0026-1270
- LCCN: 67036993
- OCLC no.: 01643482

Links
- Journal homepage; Online access; Online archive (2006-present); Online archive (1962-2005)

Methods of Information in Medicine is a peer-reviewed scientific journal covering research in medical informatics. It is an official journal of the International Medical Informatics Association, the European Federation for Medical Informatics, and the German Association for Medical Informatics, Biometry and Epidemiology. It is the oldest and longest running journal in its field.

== Abstracting and indexing ==
The journal is abstracted and indexed in:

- Current Contents/Clinical Medicine
- Embase/Excerpta Medica
- EmCare
- Index Medicus/MEDLINE/PubMed
- Science Citation Index
- Scopus

According to the Journal Citation Reports, the journal had a 2014 impact factor of 2.2. In 2015 the journal did not receive an impact factor as it was delisted because of citation stacking. The 2016 impact factor subsequently fell to 1.8 and in the 2018 release of JCR 2017 fell further to 1.5.

The editors of Methods of Information in Medicine and the other journal involved, Applied Clinical Informatics published a rebuttal in an editorial in both journals. The president and publication officer of the European Federation for Medical Informatics also commented on this matter. Phil Davis visualized the citation cartel pointing out that Lehmann and Haux (the editors of the two journals) produced a total of 4 papers in 2014 and 2015 that excessively cited each other's journal articles for the impact-factor relevant years.
