= William R. Hersh =

American biomedical informatics researcher

- Born: William Richard Hersh; July 2, 1958 (age 68); Chicago, Illinois, U.S.
- Education: University of Illinois Urbana–Champaign (BS); University of Illinois Chicago (MD)
- Scientific career
- Fields: Biomedical informatics, information retrieval, health informatics
- Workplaces: Oregon Health & Science University

William Richard Hersh (born July 2, 1958) is an American physician and professor of biomedical informatics at Oregon Health & Science University (OHSU). He was the chair of its Department of Medical Informatics and Clinical Epidemiology from 2003 to 2022. Hersh was elected to the National Academy of Medicine in 2025.

== Early life and education ==
Hersh was born and raised in Chicago. He initially studied computer science at the University of Illinois Urbana–Champaign but later changed majors to biology and graduated with a Bachelor of Science. He received his Doctor of Medicine degree from the University of Illinois Chicago in 1984 and completed a residency in internal medicine at the University of Illinois Hospital. From 1987 to 1990, he completed a medical informatics fellowship at Harvard University.

== Career ==
During his Harvard fellowship, Hersh worked on the Unified Medical Language System and developed SAPHIRE, a medical information retrieval system, with mentor Robert A. Greenes.

Hersh joined OHSU in 1990 and led the establishment of its medical informatics graduate program in 1996. In 1999, he developed an online version of his introductory informatics course. He became the first chair of the Department of Medical Informatics and Clinical Epidemiology (DMICE) in 2003 and served until 2022.

Hersh's research work has focused on biomedical information retrieval, including the use of electronic systems to search medical literature. He has authored over 200 peer-reviewed papers. In 1994, Hersh co-developed OHSUMED, a collection of medical literature and relevance assessments used to test information retrieval systems. In 1996, he published the first edition of Information Retrieval: A Health Care Perspective, a textbook on information retrieval in healthcare. Hersh subsequently published three more editions, with the last in 2020. He also edited the eighth edition of the textbook Health Informatics: Practical Guide.

His work has also included studying the retrieval of electronic health records to identify patients for clinical studies and investigated machine learning methods for identifying possible cases of rare diseases. Hersh also investigated the use of generative AI in biomedical and health professions education, including the performance of large language models on student assessments. Most of his research has been funded by the National Library of Medicine.

Between 2003 and 2012, Hersh led biomedical information retrieval evaluations through the Text Retrieval Conference (TREC), including its Genomics and Medical Records tracks. In 2005, Hersh adapted his introductory informatics course at OHSU as the first course for the American Medical Informatics Association's (AMIA) 10x10 ("ten by ten") program, which provides biomedical informatics training for healthcare professionals.

Hersh served as president of the International Academy of Health Sciences Informatics from 2020 to 2022.

== Honors and awards ==
Hersh was elected to the American College of Medical Informatics in 1996. In 2008, he received AMIA's Donald A. B. Lindberg Award for Innovation in Informatics. He became a fellow of the International Academy of Health Sciences Informatics in 2017. In 2022, he received AMIA's William W. Stead Award for Thought Leadership in Informatics and was elected to the ACM SIGIR Academy. He was elected to the National Academy of Medicine in 2025 and received the Morris F. Collen Award of Excellence in 2026.
