= IAMI =

IAMI may stand for:

- Indian Association for Medical Informatics
- Iran Aircraft Manufacturing Industrial Company
- I Am I (band)
