= David W. Bates =

Researcher

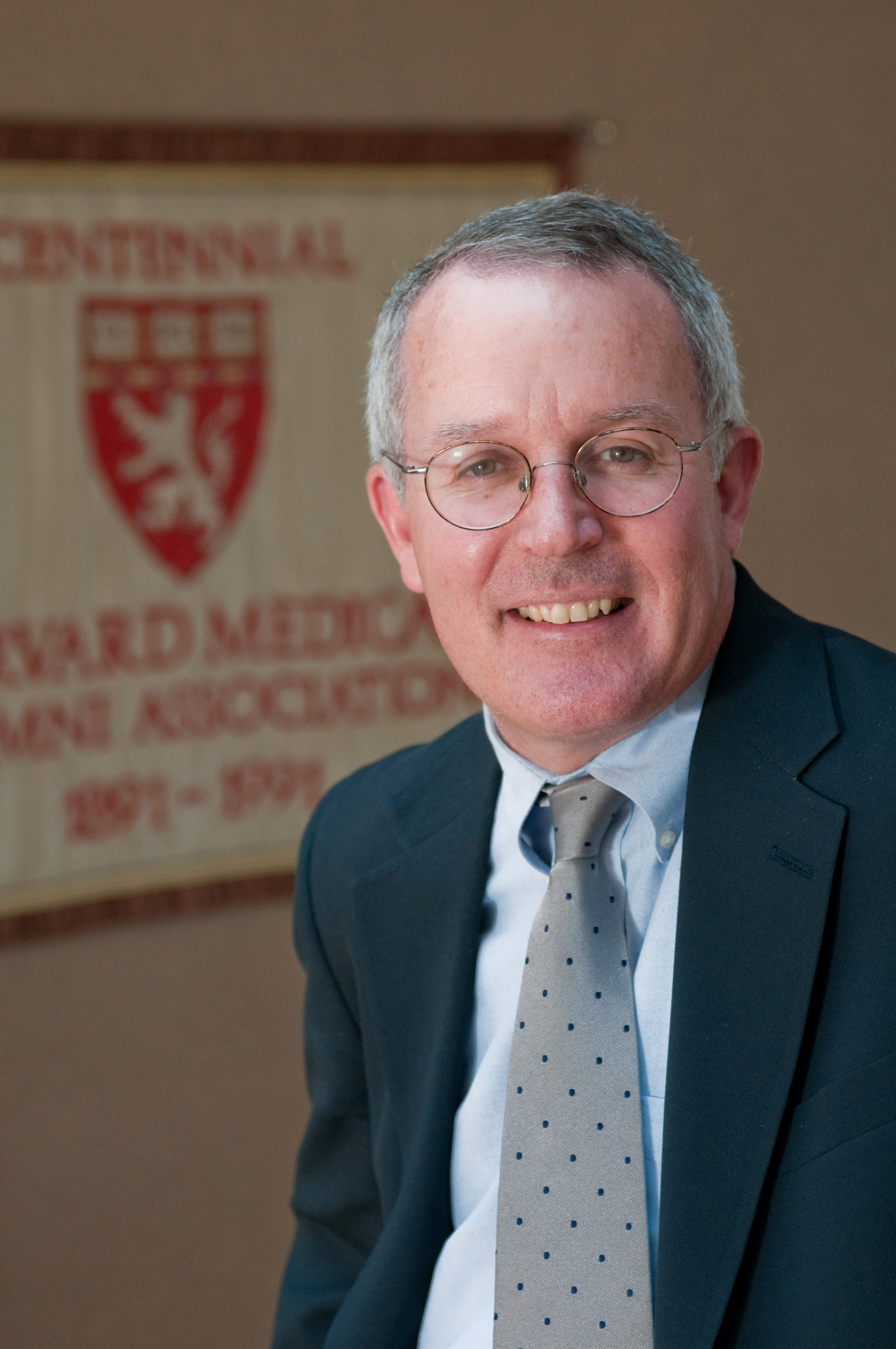
- Born: June 5, 1957 (age 69); Madison, Wisconsin
- Education: Stanford University; Johns Hopkins University School of Medicine; Oregon Health Sciences University
- Occupation: Physician
- Known for: Computerized physician order entry, clinical decision support system, health information technology
- Website: www.brighamandwomens.org/research/departments/general-internal-medicine-primary-care/patient-safety-research/ www.partners.org/cqa/

David Bates (born June 5, 1957) is an American physician, biomedical informatician, and professor, known for his work regarding the use of health information technology (HIT) to improve the safety and quality of healthcare, in particular by using clinical decision support. His Brigham and Women's Hospital studies in the 1990s helped establish the modern field of medication safety and provided much of the evidence base for the adoption of computerized physician order entry (CPOE) in hospitals. Bates is a senior physician at Brigham and Women's Hospital, medical director of clinical and quality analysis at Mass General Brigham, and a professor at both Harvard Medical School and the Harvard T.H. Chan School of Public Health.

== Early life and education ==
David Westfall Bates was born on June 5, 1957, in Madison, Wisconsin, United States and grew up in Tucson, Arizona. In high school, he worked as a computer programmer.He earned a BS from Stanford University in 1979 and an MD from Johns Hopkins University in 1983. He completed his residency in internal medicine from 1983 to 1986 at Oregon Health Sciences University in Portland, Oregon, where he subsequently held a faculty position. He then completed a fellowship in general internal medicine at Brigham and Women's Hospital and Harvard Medical School in Boston, and received an MSc from the Harvard School of Public Health in 1990.

== Career ==
After joining Brigham and Women's Hospital in 1988, Bates spent more than three decades in clinical, research, and leadership roles there and across the wider Mass General Brigham (formerly Partners HealthCare) system. He served as chief quality officer and senior vice president of Brigham and Women's from 2011 to 2014, and was appointed chief innovation officer in 2014.

Bates led the Division of General Internal Medicine and Primary Care at BWH for 25 years, stepping down as its chief in June 2023. He continues as a senior physician at the hospital and directs its Center for Patient Safety Research and Practice. He is medical director of clinical and quality analysis for information systems at Mass General Brigham and co-director of CAIBILS.

He is a professor of medicine at Harvard Medical School and a professor of health policy and management at the Harvard T.H. Chan School of Public Health. He has served as editor-in-chief of the Journal of Patient Safety.

== Advisory activities ==
Bates chaired the workgroup convened under the Food and Drug Administration Safety and Innovation Act and served as board chair of the American Medical Informatics Association. He was the external program lead for research in the World Health Organization's World Alliance for Patient Safety from 2006 to 2015, and was a member of the U.S. Health IT Policy Committee through 2016.

== Research ==
Bates is best known for a body of work, much of it conducted with Lucian Leape and colleagues at Brigham and Women's Hospital, that documented the frequency and preventability of harm from medications and tested information-technology solutions to reduce it.

His 1995 study in JAMA reported the incidence of adverse drug events (ADEs) and potential ADEs in hospitalized patients and argued that many were preventable, helping to frame medication safety as a systems problem rather than one of individual blame.

In 2023, Bates was lead author of a New England Journal of Medicine study that reviewed more than 2,800 admissions across 11 Massachusetts hospitals and identified at least one adverse event in 23.6 percent of admissions, with adverse drug events the most common type of harm. The study was cited in a 2023 report to the U.S. president by the President's Council of Advisors on Science and Technology on improving patient safety.

== Awards and honors ==
- Young Investigator of the Year Award, Society for Medical Decision-Making, 1993
- Cheers Award for Outstanding Contribution to Medication Error Prevention, Institute for Safe Medication Practices, 1999
- John M. Eisenberg Award for Patient Safety Research, 2002
- Elected member, Institute of Medicine of the National Academies, 2005
- Board of Directors Honor Award of Excellence in Medication-Use Safety, American Society of Health-System Pharmacists, 2006
- Elected member, Association of American Physicians, 2007
- John M. Eisenberg National Award for Career Achievement in Research, Society of General Internal Medicine, 2008
- Mastership Award, American College of Physicians, 2008
- Don Eugene Detmer Award for Health Policy Contribution in Informatics, American Medical Informatics Association, 2010
- Laufman-Greatbach Award, American Association for the Advancement of Instrumentation, AAMI Foundation, 2012
- Robert J. Glaser Award, Society of General Internal Medicine, 2013
- Morris F. Collen Award of Excellence, American Medical Informatics Association, 2016
- John P. Glaser Health Informatics Innovator Award, October 30, 2017

== Selected publications ==
- Bates, David W.; Cullen, David J.; Laird, Nan; et al. (1995)."Incidence of adverse drug events and potential adverse drug events: implications for prevention". JAMA. 274 (1): 29–34. doi:10.1001/jama.1995.03530010043033
- Bates, David W.; Leape, Lucian L.; Cullen, David J.; et al. (1998). "Effect of computerized physician order entry and a team intervention on prevention of serious medication errors". JAMA. 280 (15): 1311–1316. doi:10.1001/jama.280.15.1311
- Bates, David W.; Levine, David M.; Salmasian, Hojjat; et al. (2023). "The safety of inpatient health care". New England Journal of Medicine. 388 (2): 142–153. doi:10.1056/NEJMsa2206117
