= EFMI =

EFMI may refer to:

- Escape from Monkey Island, a computer adventure game developed and released by LucasArts in 2000
- Mikkeli Airport (ICAO airport code: EFMI) in Mikkeli, Finland
- European Federation for Medical Informatics
