= Morris F. Collen Award of Excellence =

Highest honor by American college of Medical Informatics

Morris F. Collen Award of Excellence is the highest honor presented by the American College of Medical Informatics. It is awarded annually to "an individual whose personal commitment and dedication to biomedical informatics has made a lasting impression on healthcare and biomedicine". The award was established in 1993 to honor Morris F. Collen, the founder of biomedical informatics, and was also the recipient of the first year's award. Recipients of this award have made significant contributions to medical informatics research, education, or leadership, advancing healthcare through innovative uses of information technology.

== Past recipients ==
The award has been presented to mostly one recipient since 1993 each year except 1995, when it was not awarded.

- 1993 Morris F. Collen
- 1994 Homer R. Warner
- 1995 Not awarded
- 1996 G. Octo Barnett
- 1997 Donald A. B. Lindberg
- 1998 Robert S. Ledley
- 1999 Joshua Lederberg
- 2000 Jean-Raoul Scherrer
- 2001 Howard L. Bleich, Warner V. Slack
- 2002 Marion J. Ball
- 2003 W. Edward Hammond
- 2004 Clement J. McDonald
- 2005 Reed M. Gardner
- 2006 Edward H. Shortliffe
- 2007 William Stead
- 2008 Robert A. Greenes
- 2009 Betsy L. Humphreys
- 2010 Don E. Detmer
- 2011 William Tierney
- 2012 Nancy M. Lorenzi
- 2013 Peter Szolovits
- 2014 Charles Safran
- 2015 Jan H. van Bemmel
- 2016 David W. Bates
- 2017 Carol Friedman
- 2018 Patricia Flatley Brennan
- 2019 James J. Cimino
- 2020 Isaac Kohane
- 2021 Randolph A. Miller
- 2022 George Hripcsak
- 2023 Suzanne R. Bakken
- 2024 Atul J. Butte
- 2025 Christopher G. Chute
- 2026 William R. Hersh
