= Morris F. Collen =

Founder of medical informatics (1913–2014)

Morris Frank Collen
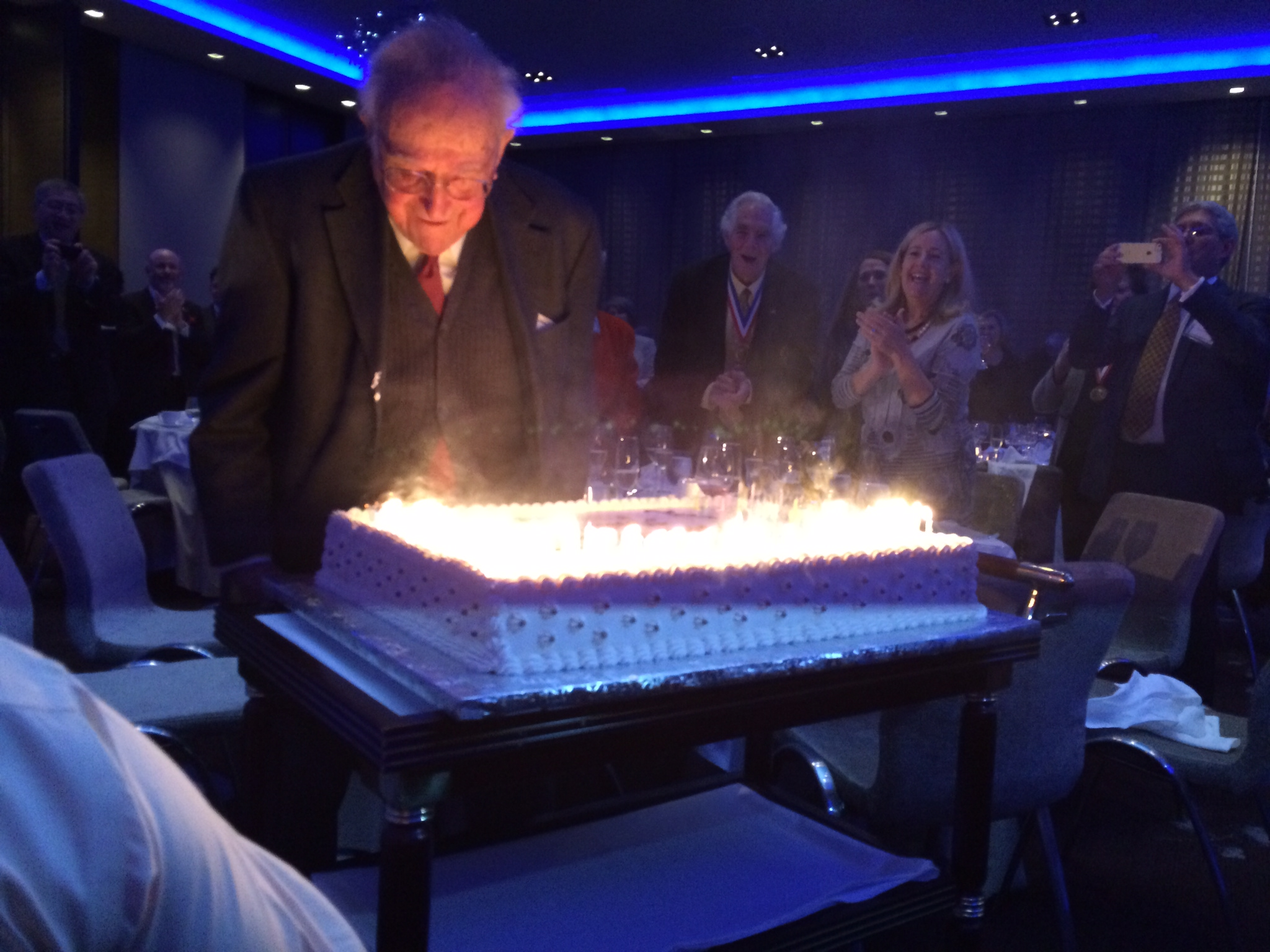
- Collen on his 100th birthday
- Born: November 12, 1913; St. Paul, Minnesota, USA
- Died: September 27, 2014 (aged 100); Walnut Creek, California, USA
- Education: University of Minnesota
- Scientific career
- Fields: Bioinformatics, health informatics
- Institutions: Los Angeles County General Hospital; Permanente Medical Group

Morris Frank Collen (November 12, 1913 – September 27, 2014) was founder of the Kaiser Permanente Division of Research and an original member of the Permanente Medical Group, pioneering developer of Automated Multiphasic Health Testing (AMHT) systems, and Electronic Health Records (EHRs) for Public Health and Clinical Screening, serving as a model for pre-paid healthcare at the national level. Collen was a Founder of the American College of Medical Informatics (ACMI) in 1984, and the American Medical Informatics Association (AMIA) in 1989. The Morris F. Collen Award of Excellence was established in his honor by ACMI in 1993. In 1971 Collen was elected a member of the Institute of Medicine of the National Academy of Sciences (now the National Academy of Medicine).

== Biography ==
Collen was born and grew up in St. Paul, Minnesota, attending the Mechanics Arts High School, followed by undergraduate studies in engineering at the University of Minnesota, later receiving an MD degree at the Medical School. After a residency at Los Angeles County General Hospital, Collen joined surgeon Sidney Garfield as original founding physicians in the Permanente Medical Group sponsored by the prominent industrialist Henry J. Kaiser. During World War 2 they cared for shipyards employees with clinical and preventive large-scale industrial healthcare using indexed information records and management systems which enabled these essential workers to deliver a virtually uninterrupted flow of the over 1,500 “Liberty Ships.” For more information on Morris F. Collen's life see: Engineering Computerized Multiphasic Health Screening - A 2005 Interview with Morris F. Collen.

After the War, the Kaiser Permanente medical group was established as one of the first general medical group practices in the USA, with Collen’s development of punched-card computer-based Multiphasic Screening growing to include data from physical examinations, comprehensive laboratory and electrophysiological testing, x-ray imaging, and a self-administered medical history. Collen became Medical Director of the West Bay Division of Kaiser Permanente and Physician in Chief, San Francisco, and founder and Director of the Kaiser Permanente Division of Research, which developed methods for health data analysis and management, and a first prototype of a well-structured electronic health record. With data gathered from the practice, Collen organized and built a unique database for research in methods of preventive care, initially focusing on chronic diseases. Collen combined his engineering, operations research, and medical skills to build computational clinical care and biomedical research resources for preventive medicine. This was a precursor for computer-based informatics models that strongly influenced the development of hospital information systems, and contributed to the shift, nationally and internationally, from a purely clinical focus to one that spanned biomedical research to public health care, including preventive medicine. These in turn led the way to the more advanced medical information technology and informatics methods that came of age after the internet and the World Wide Web led to widespread adoption of informatics methods in healthcare.

After retiring from active medical practice at Kaiser Permanente, Collen was instrumental in founding US national medical informatics professional societies: the American College of Medical Informatics (ACMI) in 1984, which established the first honorary college of Fellows for scholars and investigators in the interdisciplinary fields bringing together practitioners in medicine, nursing, and healthcare with engineers, computer scientists, mathematicians, statisticians, physicists, and the many life scientists working on clinical and biomedical informatics. In 1989, he helped found the American Medical Informatics Association (AMIA) by bringing together several former disparate professional organizations, including ACMI. In 1993 ACMI established an annual Morris F. Collen Award of Excellence. Collen was also most active in promoting collaborations with other leaders of biomedical informatics worldwide, chairing the International Medical Informatics Association (IMIA) Medical Informatics Congress (MEDINFO) 1980 Tokyo Program Committee. Collen summarized advances and contributions of medical informatics in the book A History of Medical Informatics in the United States, updated and co-edited and co-authored posthumously in 2015. Collen established and secured the foundations for medical informatics in the US and helped nurture and lead its evolution for over 50 years, so it is not surprising that in celebrating his 100th birthday in 2013 he was called “The Father of Medical Informatics.”
