= Pattern Recognition (journal) =

- Discipline: Artificial intelligence, computer science, pattern recognition
- Language: English
- Edited by: Zoran Duric; Petia Radeva

Publication details
- History: 1968–present
- Publisher: Elsevier Science
- Frequency: Monthly
- Impact factor: 9.1 (2025)

Standard abbreviations
- ISO 4: Pattern Recognit.

Indexing
- CODEN: PTNRA8
- ISSN: 0031-3203 (print); 1873-5142 (web)
- LCCN: 78004311

Links
- Journal homepage

Pattern Recognition is a single blind peer-reviewed academic journal published by Elsevier Science. It was first published in 1968 by Pergamon Press. The founding editor-in-chief was Robert Ledley, who was succeeded from 2009 until 2016 by Ching Suen of Concordia University. As of 2026 the editors-in-chief are Zoran Duric and Petia Radeva. The journal publishes papers in the general area of pattern recognition, including applications in the areas of image processing, computer vision, handwriting recognition, biometrics and biomedical signal processing. The journal awards the Pattern Recognition Society Medal to the best paper published in the journal each year. In 2020, the journal had an impact factor of 9.1 and it currently has a Scopus CiteScore of 17.3. Google Scholar currently lists the journal as ranked 8th in the top 20 publications in Computer Vision and Pattern Recognition.

== Abstracting and indexing ==
The journal is abstracted and indexed by the following services:

- ACM Guide to Computing Literature
- BIOSIS
- Cambridge Scientific Abstracts
- Current Literature on Ageing
- Current Contents/CompuMaths
- Current Contents/Engineering, Computing & Technology
- Current Contents/Social & Behavioral Sciences
- Information Science Abstracts
- Mathematical Reviews
- Engineering Index
- GEOBASE
- INSPEC
- Ocular R
- PAIS Bulletin
- PASCAL/CNRS
- Research Alert
- SCISEARCH
- SSSA/CISA/ECA/ISMEC
- Science Citation Index
- Zentralblatt MATH
- Scopus
