= Petia Radeva =

Bulgarian computer scientist

Pètia Ivonova Radeva is a Bulgarian computer scientist who works in Spain at the University of Barcelona, as a professor in the Faculty of Mathematics and Computer Science and Institute of Mathematics, and head of the Artificial Intelligence and Bio-Medical Applications consolidated research group. Her research involves machine learning for computer vision applications in medical imaging, and also includes work on egocentric vision.

== Education and career ==
Radeva received a bachelor's degree at Sofia University in Bulgaria in 1989. She came to Barcelona for graduate study at the Autonomous University of Barcelona, received a master's degree in 1993, and completed her Ph.D. in 1996.

She has been a full professor at the University of Barcelona since 2018, and is one of two editors-in-chief of the journal Pattern Recognition.

== Recognition ==
Radeva was named as a Fellow of the International Association for Pattern Recognition in 2016, "for contributions to computer vision, machine learning, egocentric vision, life-logging, and medical imaging".

She was one of three recipients of the 2024 Narcís Monturiol Medal of the government of Catalonia.
