= Umberto Tachinardi =

- Born: 1959 (age 66–67); São Paulo - Brazil
- Education: Itajubá School of Medicine; University of São Paulo
- Known for: Sustainable development and management of Health information systems
- Awards: Inducted Fellow, American College of Medical Informatics
- Scientific career
- Fields: Digital Health; Health Informatics; Health information management
- Workplaces: UC Health; University of Cincinnati - College of Medicine; Regenstrief Institute; Indiana University School of Medicine; University of Wisconsin–Madison; University of Chicago; State of São Paulo; Heart Institute (InCor); University of São Paulo

Umberto Tachinardi, MD, MSc, Fellow ACMI,AMIA and IAHSI, is a digital health informatics professional. Trained by the founders Candido Pinto de Melo, Lincoln de Assis Moura Jr and Sergio Shiguemi Furuie) of the prestigious Medical Informatics group of the Heart Institute of São Paulo University Medical School (InCor - Instituto do Coração da Universidade de São Paulo), he started his career developing biomedical signal processing systems on cardiology. Dr. Tachinardi pioneered the use of secure world-wide-web (internet) communications for transmission of medical records in 1994. In addition, he has devoted many years to innovate clinical practice through the development and deployment of integrated clinical information systems as CIO of the InCor and later as the CIO of the Secretary of Health, State of São Paulo. Dr. Tachinardi has thus worked extensively on matters of reengineering the administration and management of medical practices on a large scale. Between 2019-2022, he was an Assistant Dean for Clinical Informatics at the Indiana University School of Medicine. In and a professor of statistics. Currently is the Chief Health Digital Officer at UC Health and Chair of the Department of Biostatistics, Health Informatics and Data Sciences at the College of Medicine of the University of Cincinnati. Dr. Tachinardi has presented over 175 publications, invited lectures, and tutorials.

== Key Biography ==
- Former president of the Brazilian Society of Health Informatics.
- Member of the editorial board of the Journal of Health Informatics

== Honors ==
- 2005 Nominated Best Information Technology Professional, Government Sector. Informatics Today [Plano Editorial, Informática Hoje], Brazil. (Top 5 best),
- 2004 Nominated Best Information Technology Professional, Government Sector. Informatics Today [Plano Editorial, Informática Hoje], Brazil. (Top 5 best)
- 2003 First Place. Best Information Technology Professional, Health Care Sector. Informatics Today [Plano Editorial, Informática Hoje], Brazil.
- 2002 Top 100 IT Leaders. Computerworld, Brazilian Edition.
- 2001 Top 50 Information Technology Executives. Info Exame, Brazil
- 1998 Best Implementation Project in Health Care, National Council of Public Informatics (CONIP), Brazil.

== Publications ==
- Medline Publications
- Google Scholar Citations
