= Health Informatics Society of Australia =

Australian scientific society

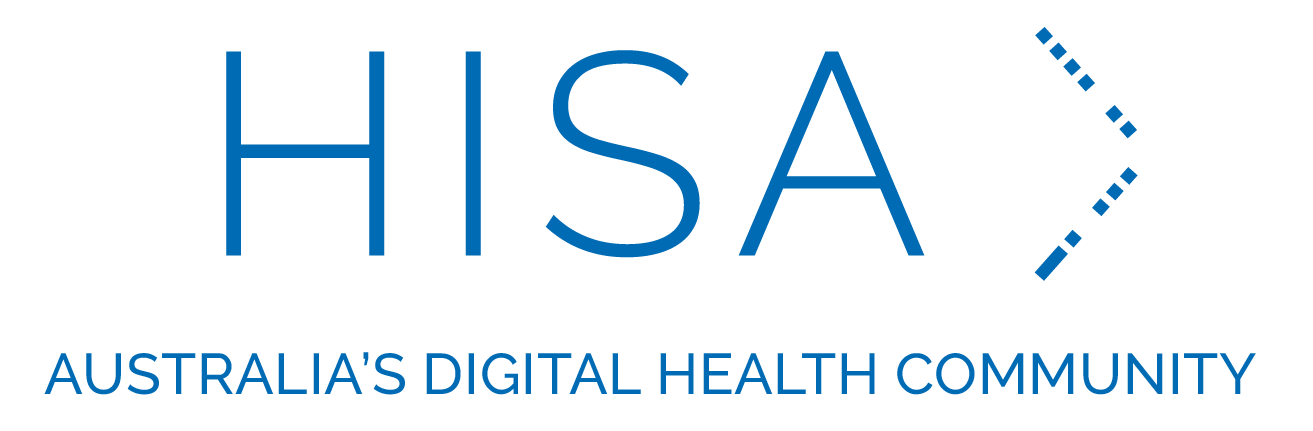
HISA logo

The Health Informatics Society of Australia Ltd (HISA) is a scientific society, established in 1992, for health informaticians and those with an interest in health informatics.

Health informatics is the science and practice around information in health that leads to informed and assisted healthcare. ‘Informed’ here means ‘that the right information about the subject (consumer, patient or population) together with relevant health knowledge, is available at the right time and in a form that allows it to be used’. ‘Assisted’ here means ‘that the job of the healthcare worker is made safer and easier and that the health consumer is supported in their decisions and actions’.

E-health, defined by the World Health Organization as the combined use of electronic communication and information technology in the health sector, is a sub-discipline of health informatics.

HISA aims to improve health through health informatics. It provides a national focus for the science and practice of health informatics, and for its practitioners - health informaticians, as well as for the associated industry and users. It develops policy, advocates on behalf of its members and provides opportunities for learning and professional development in health informatics. Its membership is drawn from consumers, clinicians and other health information systems users as well as health informaticians, engineers, scientists, technologists, systems developers, managers, psychologists, lawyers, policy officers, researchers and others.

HISA has communities of practice in nursing informatics, user experience, clinical informatics, cybersecurity and digital hospital design.

One of the education activities of the society is the annual national Health Informatics Conference (HIC) which attracts around 1000 delegates and features a sizeable trade show and the country's only interoperability demonstration. HISA is the national affiliate of the International Medical Informatics Association and convener of the Coalition for E-Health.
