= BMJ Health & Care Informatics =

- Discipline: Health informatics
- Language: English
- Edited by: Yu-Chuan Jack Li

Publication details
- Former names: Journal of Innovation in Health Informatics; Informatics in Primary Care
- History: 1992–present
- Publisher: British Medical Journal (United Kingdom)
- Frequency: Continuous publication
- Open access: Yes
- License: CC-BY 4.0
- Impact factor: 6.2 (2025)

Standard abbreviations
- ISO 4: BMJ Health Care Inform.

Indexing
- BMJ Health & Care Informatics
- ISSN: 2632-1009
- OCLC no.: 1099670708
- Journal of Innovation in Health Informatics
- ISSN: 2058-4555 (print); 2058-4563 (web)
- OCLC no.: 912495618
- Informatics in Primary Care
- ISSN: 1476-0320 (print); 1475-9985 (web)
- OCLC no.: 55233976

Links
- Journal homepage; JIHI website; JIHI Online access; JIHI Online archive

BMJ Health & Care Informatics is a peer-reviewed open-access medical journal covering health informatics. It was established in 1992 and is published by the BMJ. The editor-in-chief is Yu-Chuan Jack Li. The journal was established in 1992 as Informatics in Primary Care, and was renamed to Journal of Innovation in Health Informatics in 2015, obtaining its current name in 2019.

It is an official publication of the British Computer Society and has a partnership agreement with the Faculty of Clinical Informatics.

== Abstracting and indexing ==
The journal is abstracted and indexed in: Index Medicus/MEDLINE/PubMed, Scopus, and EBSCOhost.
