= Brazilian Society of Health Informatics =

Sociedade Brasileira de Informática em Saúde (SBIS)
- Abbreviation: SBIS
- Formation: November 1986
- Type: Professional society
- Legal status: Active
- Purpose: Promoting development and interchange of ideas in health informatics
- Headquarters: Campinas
- Location: Brazil
- Region served: Latin America
- Members: Approximately 780 associates
- Official language: Portuguese
- President: Dr. Cláudio Giulliano Alves da Costa
- Affiliations: International Medical Informatics Association
- Website: Official website

The Sociedade Brasileira de Informática em Saúde (Brazilian Society of Health Informatics), abbreviated as SBIS, is a professional society created in November 1986 in Campinas, during the First Brazilian Congress on Health Informatics. It has the mission of promoting the development and the interchange of ideas and results in the fields devoted to the information technologies applied to the health sciences (Medical informatics, Telemedicine, Bioinformatics, etc.).

== Mission and areas of interest ==
SBIS is a nonprofit membership organization of individuals and institutions interested in developing and using information technologies to improve health care in Brazil. To accomplish its goal, SBIS may develop the following activities:

- Stimulate educational activities related to health informatics;
- Stimulate scientific research and technical development in Health Informatics;
- Organize conferences, symposiums, courses, seminars, and other activities that lead to experience and knowledge exchange;
- Cooperate with sister societies;
- Contribute to the definition of healthcare policies;
- Promote Health Informatics as a means to reduce costs and improve the quality of healthcare services.

Some of SBIS areas of interest are:

- Health information systems
- Health information management
- Electronic patient record
- Telemedicine and telehealth
- Medical decision support systems
- Biological signal processing
- Medical image processing
- Internet applications in health
- Health information standards
- Health informatics education
- Distance education in health

Currently it has around 780 associates, thus being the third largest in the Americas, after the American Medical Informatics Association and the Canada's Health Informatics Association, and the largest in Latin America, according to the International Medical Informatics Association. The Society is affiliated to the International Medical Informatics Association since 1988.

== Governance ==
The current Executive Board (2008–2010) is led by Dr. Cláudio Giulliano Alves da Costa (President). Former presidents were: Roberto J. Rodrigues, Renato M.E. Sabbatini, Mariza Machado Klück, Beatriz de Faria Leão, Daniel Sigulem, Umberto Tachinardi, Lincoln de Assis Moura Jr. and Heimar de Fátima Marin. Short histories of Health Informatics in Brazil have been published elsewhere by former presidents of the Society.

== Conferences and Meetings ==
SBIS organizes since 1986 a biannual national conference, the Brazilian Congress of Health Informatics and a biannual specialized conference on Electronic Health Records (PEP); besides other, smaller and less periodical meetings.

The Brazilian Congress on Health Informatics takes place in different cities every two years and has as its main subjects the applications of information technology and telematics to medicine, nursing, dentistry and allied health care sciences, from the point of view of the expert scientific and technical worker in these areas. The first conference was organized in November 1986, in the city of Campinas by Dr. Renato M.E. Sabbatini. The vice-president was Dr. Hugo Sabatino, and the editor-in-chief of the Conference's proceedings was Dr. Renato G.G. Terzi, all with the Medical School at the same university. During this conference, the Brazilian Society of Health Informatics was launched, as well as the Brazilian Journal of Health Informatics. The conference was then repeated in 1988 (São Paulo), 1990, 1992, 1994, 1996 (Campos do Jordão), 1998, 2000, 2002, 2004 (Natal), 2006 (Florianópolis) and 2008 (Campos do Jordão). The next conference will be held in November 2010, in Porto de Galinhas, Pernambuco.

== Publications ==
SBIS' flagship periodical is the on-line scientific journal, Journal of Health Informatics (Heimar Marin, Editor-in-Chief). It also publishes SBIS News, an electronic bulletin hosted by Yahoo! Groups (Renato M.E. Sabbatini, editor-in-chief), and coordinates the SBIS-L e-mail discussion list.

== Electronic Health Record Certification Project ==
In collaboration with the Brazilian Federal Council of Medicine since 2007, SBIS has developed one of few programs in the developing world geared towards the software certification in the area of electronic health records. The standards for access, information security, digital certification, patient confidentiality, storage of records, etc., have been discussed together and officially approved by a number of decrees enforced by CFM and are part now of a Manual, a course for buildup of a task force of specialized consultants. The certification standards cover ambulatory healthcare, clinical laboratory and other areas, and in the future will be expanded for inpatient health records and Picture archiving and communication system.

== Professional Education ==
In 2008 the Society approved the creation of a new initiative and a directorship to boost educational activities in health informatics. A website and a Learning Management System based on Moodle server were created in 2009 (address ). The site is used to support presential courses as well as to offer purely distance courses, seminars, lectures, and other educational activities. The site has also a digital library with on-line references to papers, reviews, e-books, multimedia files, etc., which are deemed useful for education and learning purposes. In addition, webconferencing facilities using DimDim have been added and can be used by associated individuals and institutions.

== Professional Certificate in Health Informatics ==
In October 2009 the Society launched a program for certificating health care professionals as specialists, in a manner similar to medical specialties coordinated by the Brazilian Medical Association and the Federal Council of Medicine in Brazil. The program entails a minimum list of technical proficiency, a written and oral annual examination, and the issue of a certificate which is valid for five years. The revalidation of the certificate will be mandatory by means of continuing education credits. The Society installed also an educational accreditation program in place, for recognizing courses and curricula in health informatics, for this purpose, with a point-based system of credits. The entire program is under the responsibility of a new Directorship of Professional Education, coordinated by Prof. Renato M.E. Sabbatini.
