= Lucian Leape =

American physician and researcher (1930–2025)

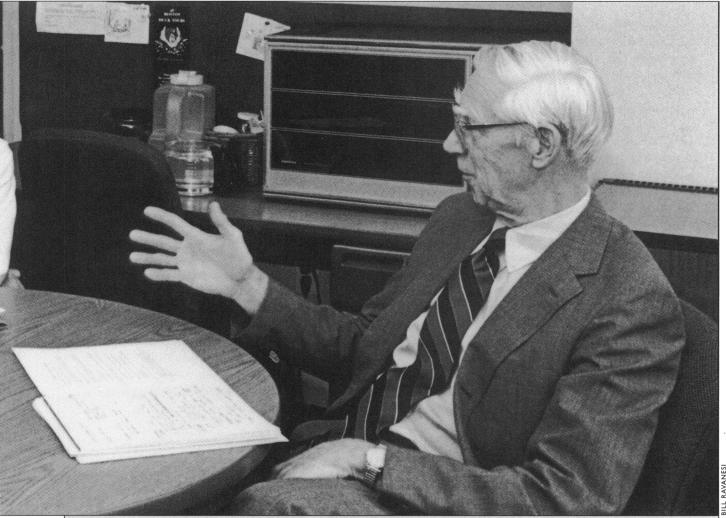
Leape in 1999

Lucian L. Leape (November 7, 1930 – June 30, 2025) was an American pediatric surgeon and academic, who became one of the world's foremost experts on preventing medical errors. His most important works on the topic were the results of the Harvard Medical Practice Study, published in 1991 in the New England Journal of Medicine and the article "Error in Medicine," published in JAMA in 1994, which called for the application of systems theory to prevent medical errors. His work drew early anger and criticism, but eventually won over the medical professions.

== Early life and education ==
Born in Bellevue, Pennsylvania on November 7, 1930, his father Lucian Leroy Leape was a purchasing agent and his mother Mildred Grace (née West) Leape was a teacher and piano instructor.

Leape earned the Eagle Scout award as a youth and was recognized by the Boy Scouts of America as a Distinguished Eagle Scout.

He attended Mercersburg Academy, where he was a member of the class of 1948.

Leape received an AB from Cornell University in 1952, where he studied chemistry. He met his future wife, Martha Palmer, at Cornell. He was a member of the Phi Kappa Psi fraternity. He also served on an Interfraternity Council committee "to study discrimination as a fraternity problem." He graduated from Harvard Medical School in 1959.

Between his graduation from Cornell and attending Harvard Medical School, Leape was an officer in the United States Navy Reserve and served on the USS Leyte. He rose to the rank of lieutenant.

== Pediatric surgeon ==
His postgraduate training took place at Massachusetts General Hospital and Children's Hospital Boston.

Leape became a pediatric surgeon, eventually becoming professor of surgery at Tufts Medical School and chief of pediatric surgery at New England Medical Center in 1973.

== Medical safety ==
In 1997, he testified before a subcommittee of the US Senate with his recommendations for improving medical safety.

Leape became a professor at the Harvard School of Public Health.

== Personal life and death ==
Leape was married to Martha Kinne Palmer in 1954, whom he met while attending Cornell. They had three sons. Leape died of heart failure in Lexington, Massachusetts on June 30, 2025, at the age of 94. His wife had predeceased him earlier in the year.

== Selected publications ==
- Leape, Lucian L (1987). Patient Care in Pediatric Surgery. Boston: Little Brown. ISBN 0-316-51821-2.
- Brennan, Troyen A.; —; Laird, Nan M.; Hebert, Liesi; Localio, A. Russell; Lawthers, Ann G.; Newhouse, Joseph P.; Weiler, Paul C.; Hiatt, Howard H. (February 7, 1991). "Incidence of Adverse Events and Negligence in Hospitalized Patients: Results of the Harvard Medical Practice Study I". New England Journal of Medicine. 324 (6): 370–376. doi:10.1056/NEJM199102073240604. PMID 1987460.
- —; Brennan, Troyen A.; Laird, Nan; Lawthers, Ann G.; Localio, A. Russell; Barnes, Benjamin A.; Hebert, Liesi; Newhouse, Joseph P.; Weiler, Paul C.; Hiatt, Howard (February 7, 1991). "The Nature of Adverse Events in Hospitalized Patients: Results of the Harvard Medical Practice Study II". New England Journal of Medicine. 324 (6): 377–384. doi:10.1056/NEJM199102073240605. PMID 1824793.
- — (December 21, 1994). "Error in Medicine". JAMA: The Journal of the American Medical Association. 272 (23): 1851–1857. doi:10.1001/jama.1994.03520230061039.
- — (2021). Making Healthcare Safe: the Story of the Patient Safety Movement. Cham, Switzerland: Springer. doi:10.1007/978-3-030-71123-8. ISBN 978-3-030-71123-8.
