= G. Anthony Gorry =

American computer scientist

George Anthony Gorry is an American computer scientist, who served as the Friedkin Professor Emeritus of Management at Jesse H. Jones Graduate School of Business, Rice University and a member of National Academy of Medicine and Fellow of American College of Medical Informatics.

Gorry graduated from Yale University with a degree in engineering in 1962 before completing a master's in chemical engineering from the University of California, Berkeley in 1963. He completed a PhD in computer science at MIT in 1967. He worked as faculty at MIT before moving to Houston to serve as vice president for information technology at Baylor in 1975. He joined the faculty at Rice University in 1992.

Through his research career, Gorry published in fields including knowledge management, management, education, applied math, and other areas. His early research focused on the use of artificial intelligence in clinical settings.

In addition to scholarly works, Gorry published fiction and memoir. Notably, Paul Dry Books published his memoir, Memory's Encouragement, in 2017. Gorry chronicled his efforts to learn Greek both in Memory's Encouragement and in an article published in The Classical Journal.
