= Health Informatics Journal =

- Discipline: Health informatics
- Language: English
- Edited by: Rob Procter

Publication details
- History: 1992–present
- Publisher: SAGE Publications
- Frequency: Quarterly
- Impact factor: 1.833 (2017)

Standard abbreviations
- ISO 4: Health Inform. J.

Indexing
- ISSN: 1460-4582 (print); 1741-2811 (web)
- LCCN: sn99039672
- OCLC no.: 49996259

Links
- Journal homepage; Online access; Online archive

The Health Informatics Journal is a quarterly peer-reviewed medical journal that covers the field of health informatics. its editors-in-chief are Rob Procter (University of Warwick) and P. A. Bath (University of Sheffield). It was established in 1992 and is published by SAGE Publications. Chris Dowd (University of Sheffield) was editor from launch to 1997 and M F Smith from 1997 to 2001.

== Abstracting and indexing ==
The journal is abstracted and indexed in:

- Science Citation Index Expanded
- Scopus
- Academic Premier
- Educational Research Abstracts Online
- Health & Safety Science Abstracts
- MEDLINE

According to the Journal Citation Reports, the journal has a 2016 impact factor of 3.021, ranking it 6 out of 23 journals in the category "Medical Informatics" and 20 out of 90 journals in the category "Health Care Sciences & Services".
