= Howard Bleich =

American nephrologist

Howard Leslie Bleich
- Born: 1934; Atlanta, Georgia, United States
- Died: 2021 (aged 86–87)
- Education: George Washington University (BA); Emory University School of Medicine (MD)
- Known for: Co-founding the Division of Computer Medicine; development of early clinical information systems
- Awards: Morris F. Collen Award of Excellence (2001)
- Scientific career
- Fields: Nephrology; Medical informatics
- Institutions: Harvard Medical School; Beth Israel Deaconess Medical Center; Brigham and Women's Hospital

Howard Leslie Bleich (1934 – 2021) was an American nephrologist, distinguished professor, and pioneer in the field of medical informatics. He was known for his contributions to the integration of computer technology in clinical medicine and his research in the field.

He co-founded with Warner V. Slack the Division of Computer Medicine at Harvard Medical School in 1970. The Division was among the first academic divisions to concentrate on the use of computers for patient care, teaching and medical research.

He was awarded the Morris F. Collen Award of Excellence from the American College of Medical Informatics in 2001.

== Early life and education ==
Bleich was born in Atlanta, Georgia, and grew up in Washington, D.C. He completed his undergraduate studies at George Washington University in 1955 before attending Emory University School of Medicine, where he earned his medical degree.

== Career ==
After medical school, he served as a flight surgeon in the Air Force before completing a fellowship in Nephrology with the William B. Schwartz, at Tufts New England Medical Center. Bleich's joined Harvard Medical School and Beth Israel Deaconess Medical Center in 1967. He was a Professor of Medicine at Harvard Medical School and served on the editorial board of the New England Journal of Medicine. He was editor of the Beth Israel Seminars in Medicine within the journal.

Bleich's research and work is associated within medical informatics, a field he helped pioneer. He developed computer-based systems aimed at improving clinical care. In the late 1960s, he developed an "Acid-Base Therapy Advisor," a system that not only suggested diagnoses but also recommended treatment.

In 1970, Bleich, with the support of Howard Hiatt, recruited Warner Slack to co-found the "Division of Computer Medicine". He developed systems such as the Medical Information Retrieval System (MISAR) which was the basis for the Veteran’s Administrations hospital information system’s “Fileman” and the end-user literature searching program "PaperChase" which was the forerunner of the National Library of Medicine’s PubMed. These systems laid the foundation for modern medical information systems.

In 1977, Bleich and Slack computerized medical records over a period of 5 years at Boston’s Beth Israel Hospital.

In 1983, Bleich and Slack ported their computer system from Boston’s Beth Israel Hospital to Brigham and Women's Hospital, leading to the establishment of the Center for Clinical Computing. In addition to computerizing all clinical and ancillary functions within the hospital, the BWH system included a full suite of financial applications. Their system, named the CCC system, laid foundation in clinical informatics, evolving to meet the needs of healthcare professionals and patients alike.

== Selected publications ==
- Slack, Warner V; Kowaloff, Hollis B; Davis, Roger B; Delbanco, Tom; Locke, Steven E; Safran, Charles; Bleich, Howard L (July 2012). "Evaluation of computer-based medical histories taken by patients at home". Journal of the American Medical Informatics Association. 19 (4): 545–548. doi:10.1136/amiajnl-2011-000580. PMC 3384115. PMID 22237866.
- Slack, Warner V; Kowaloff, Hollis B; Davis, Roger B; Delbanco, Tom; Locke, Steven E; Bleich, Howard L (January 2011). "Test—retest reliability in a computer-based medical history". Journal of the American Medical Informatics Association. 18 (1): 73–76. doi:10.1136/jamia.2010.005983. PMC 3005870. PMID 21113077.
- Bleich, Howard L.; Slack, Warner V. (January 2010). "Reflections on electronic medical records: When doctors will use them and when they will not". International Journal of Medical Informatics. 79 (1): 1–4. doi:10.1016/j.ijmedinf.2009.10.002. PMID 19939731.
- Coletti, M. H.; Bleich, H. L. (1 July 2001). "Medical Subject Headings Used to Search the Biomedical Literature". Journal of the American Medical Informatics Association. 8 (4): 317–323. doi:10.1136/jamia.2001.0080317. PMC 130076. PMID 11418538.
- Slack, Warner V.; Bleich, Howard L. (June 1999). "The CCC system in two teaching hospitals: a progress report". International Journal of Medical Informatics. 54 (3): 183–196. doi:10.1016/S1386-5056(99)00006-4. PMID 10405878.
- Bleich, H (1998). "Why good hospitals get bad computing". Stud Health Technol Inform. 52 Pt 2: 969–972. ISSN 0926-9630. PMID 10384604.
- Zieman, Y. L.; Bleich, H. L. (1997). "Conceptual mapping of user's queries to medical subject headings". Proceedings: A Conference of the American Medical Informatics Association. AMIA Fall Symposium: 519–522. ISSN 1091-8280. PMC 2233300. PMID 9357680.
- Shortliffe, E. H.; Bleich, H. L.; Caine, C. G.; Masys, D. R.; Simborg, D. W. (1 July 1996). "The Federal Role in the Health Information Infrastructure: A Debate of the Pros and Cons of Government Intervention". Journal of the American Medical Informatics Association. 3 (4): 249–257. doi:10.1136/jamia.1996.96413132. PMC 116307. PMID 8816347.
