= Robert Ledley =

American academic (1926–2012)

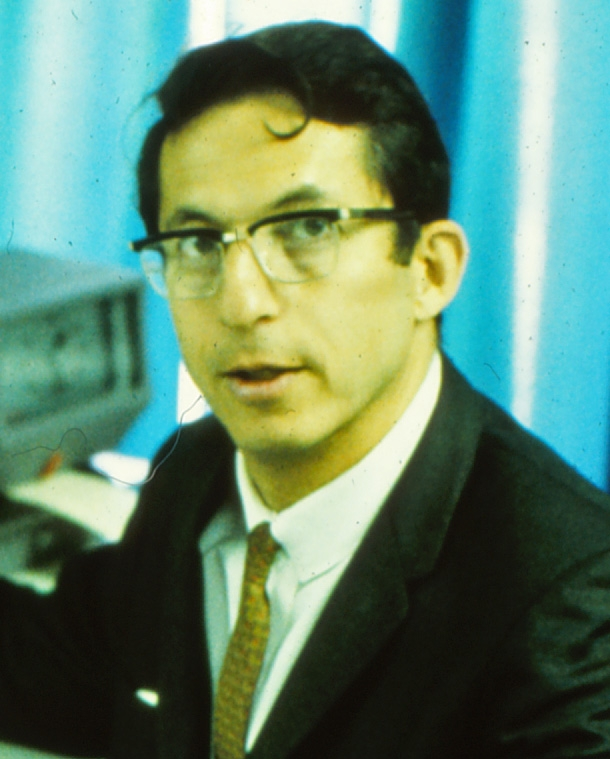
- Robert Ledley
- Born: June 28, 1926; Flushing, Queens, New York, U.S.
- Died: July 24, 2012 (aged 86); Kensington, Maryland, U.S.
- Education: New York University; Columbia University
- Known for: Whole-body CT/CAT Scanner; Optical Pattern Recognition; Bioinformatics; Computing Advocacy
- Spouse: Terry Ledley (née Wachtell)
- Awards: National Medal of Technology; National Inventors Hall of Fame
- Scientific career
- Fields: mathematics, physics, computing, biology, medicine, dentistry
- Workplaces: National Bureau of Standards; George Washington University; Georgetown University; National Biomedical Research Foundation

Robert Steven Ledley (June 28, 1926 – July 24, 2012), professor of physiology and biophysics and professor of radiology at Georgetown University School of Medicine, pioneered the use of electronic digital computers in biology and medicine. In 1959, he wrote two influential articles in Science: "Reasoning Foundations of Medical Diagnosis" (with Lee B. Lusted) and "Digital Electronic Computers in Biomedical Science". Both articles encouraged biomedical researchers and physicians to adopt computer technology.

In 1960 he established the National Biomedical Research Foundation (NBRF), a non-profit research organization dedicated to promoting the use of computers and electronic equipment in biomedical research. At the NBRF Ledley pursued several major projects: the early 1960s development of the Film Input to Digital Automatic Computer (FIDAC), which automated the analysis of chromosomes; the invention of the Automatic Computerized Transverse Axial (ACTA) whole-body CT scanner in the mid-1970s; managing the Atlas of Protein Sequence and Structure (created in 1965 by Margaret O. Dayhoff); and the establishment of the Protein Information Resource in 1984. Ledley also served as editor of several major peer-reviewed biomedical journals.

In 1990, Ledley was inducted into the National Inventors Hall of Fame. He was awarded the National Medal of Technology in 1997. He retired as president and research director of the NBRF in 2010.

== Family and education ==
Robert Ledley was born on June 28, 1926, in Flushing Meadows, Queens, New York City. His father, Joseph Levy, was an accountant and his mother, Kate Levy, was a schoolteacher before becoming a homemaker. Robert had a sister, Marion, and a half-brother, Ralph. All three siblings were surnamed Ledley.

Among Ledley's childhood friends in Flushing was Margaret Oakley Dayhoff, who would later spend most of her career working at the National Biomedical Research Foundation and who would become a founder of the field of bioinformatics. Ledley attended the Horace Mann School, from which he graduated in 1943.

As an undergraduate student at Columbia University Ledley excelled in physics, taking undergraduate and graduate courses within his first two years as a student. When, however, he informed his parents of his desire to become a physicist, they objected on the grounds that a career in physics would not be feasible for him given the scarcity of steady jobs in that field. Instead, they urged him to make his living as a dentist. Ledley attempted to follow both paths at once; he enrolled in the New York University College of Dentistry while continuing to pursue his education in physics at Columbia. During the day, Ledley would take dentistry training courses at NYU, then he would take the subway to Columbia to take evening courses in physics. After receiving his DDS from NYU in 1948, Ledley became a full-time physics graduate student at Columbia, where he took courses from many noted physicists including I.I. Rabi (who joked that Ledley was the only physicist who could pull a man's tooth), Enrico Fermi, Hans Bethe, and J.A. Wheeler. Ledley received a MS in physics from Columbia in 1950.

In 1949, Ledley married Terry Wachtell (born 1926), a mathematics teacher at Queens College, and sister of Herbert Wachtell. The couple had two sons, Fred (born 1954) and Gary (born 1957). When the couple moved to the DC area in the early 1950s, Terry was employed as a computer programmer until leaving work to raise their sons. Both sons graduated from Georgetown University School of Medicine. Fred Ledley is Professor of Natural and Applied Sciences at Bentley University and is the author of numerous scientific papers as well as the novel, Sputnik's Child (2011). Gary Ledley is a practicing cardiologist associated with Drexel University.

Robert Ledley died of Alzheimer's disease in Kensington, Maryland, USA on July 24, 2012.

== Early research career ==
=== U.S. Army dental research ===
In 1950, shortly after the outbreak of the Korean War, Ledley was contacted by a U.S. Army recruitment officer, who offered him a choice: he could volunteer to join the U.S. Army Dental Corps as a first lieutenant or be conscripted into the infantry as a private. Ledley promptly volunteered, and was sent to the U.S. Army Medical Field Service School for training. Because Ledley was also trained in physics, he was assigned to a dental research unit at Walter Reed General Hospital, in Washington, D.C.

During his time in the army, Ledley was responsible for improving prosthetic dental devices (such as dentures) then widely used by Army personnel. Notably, Ledley drew on his training in dentistry and physics to develop a system that optimized the process of fitting dentures by allowing dentists to determine the "angle of chew," or the mean slope of each tooth relative to the surface of an object (e.g. a piece of food) being bitten. Ledley presented this work to the American Physical Society in 1952, and it generated nationwide attention via an Associated Press newspaper story titled "Mathematics Used to Keep False Teeth in Place."

=== Work with Standards Eastern Automatic Computer ===
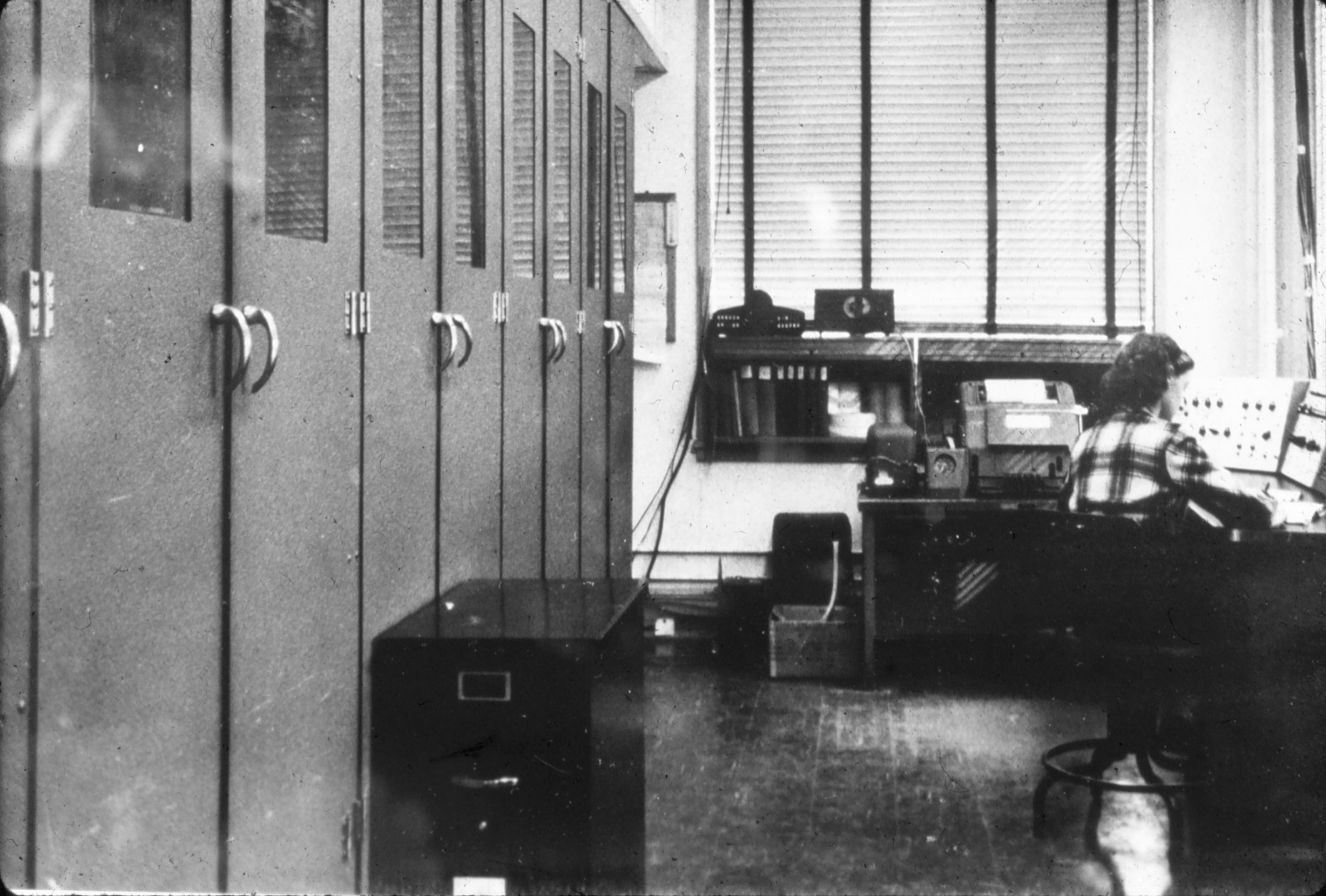
Terry Ledley operating the Standards Eastern Automatic Computer (SEAC) at the National Bureau of Standards in the early 1950s. Robert Ledley learned to program on this computer, first via paper tapes Terry brought to him and then by using the machine extensively himself.

Ledley's work on dental prosthetics brought him into collaboration with researchers based at the National Bureau of Standards Dental Materials Research Section, where he was offered a research job in 1952 following his discharge from the Army. There he encountered the Standards Eastern Automatic Computer, one of the earliest stored-program electronic digital computers. Ledley's first interaction with SEAC came via his wife, Terry, who worked as one of the machine's programmers – Robert taught himself to program by examining programs (on perforated paper tape) and manuals Terry brought home. Ledley started to use SEAC himself for his dental research, but after proving an adept programmer and troubleshooter, he found himself working with SEAC (and later DYSEAC) full-time on a wide variety of projects, including a remote-controlled aircraft guidance system.

For Ledley, working with SEAC produced an epiphany, concerning both his career and the potential importance of computers to biomedical research. He recalled: "I had previously realized that although, conceptually, physics equations could be written to describe any biomedical phenomenon, such equations would be so complex that they could not feasibly be solved in closed form. Thus SEAC would be my panacea, because the equations would become tractable to numerical methods of solutions. Or so I truly believed at the time. That was to be my field, application of computers to biomedical problems."

=== Operations research and the RNA Tie Club ===
Though Ledley had envisioned a career of employing computers to solve biomedical problems as early as the early 1950s, it would be several years before he would pursue that career full-time. At the National Bureau of Standards, Ledley's work was primarily related to solving military problems using the techniques of operations research. For instance, he published an article in the journal Operations Research showing how one could use Boolean algebra to reduce complex military decision-making problems to the point where they could be resolved using a collection of truth tables and yes-or-no questions.

When Ledley lost his job at the NBS in 1954 due to budget cuts, he turned down an offer to work for IBM (which hired Ledley's colleagues en masse). Instead, he found employment as an "Operations Research Analyst" at the Operations Research Office at Johns Hopkins University. There, his work remained mostly focused on military problems, but his expertise in biology, physics, mathematics, and computing caught the attention of one of his new ORO colleagues, George Gamow. Gamow, who was renowned for his contributions to the Big Bang cosmological model, had taken an interest in molecular biology immediately after James D. Watson and Francis Crick elucidated the double helix structure of DNA in 1953. Gamow believed Ledley's skills could be instrumental in helping to crack the genetic code, that is, by solving the problem of how a DNA sequence translates into proteins. In 1954, Gamow invited Ledley to join the elite RNA Tie Club; some other members of the club were Watson, Crick, Richard Feynman, Max Delbrück, Edward Teller, and Sydney Brenner.

Ledley's main work for the RNA Tie Club was an effort to generate a set of contingency tables for the purpose of writing a computer program that would determine the correspondence between any three-letter sequence (triplet) of nucleotide bases and any amino acid (the building blocks of proteins). Sponsored by Gamow, Ledley published his work in 1955 in the Proceedings of the National Academy of Sciences. Though Ledley had produced a combinatorial table that could theoretically be used to determine which three-letter sequence of DNA bases corresponded to which amino acid, the problem required several thousand years of computation time on the world's fastest computers (circa 1955) to produce a solution.

Having established that computers could not be used reasonably quickly to decode DNA, Ledley drifted away from the RNA Tie Club. Ultimately the code was broken in the 1961 Nirenberg and Matthaei experiment, which did not use computers and which was not carried out by RNA Tie Club members.

=== Electrical engineering ===
In 1956, Ledley was hired as an assistant professor of electrical engineering at the George Washington University School of Engineering and Applied Science. There, he taught some of the earliest courses on computer programming and wrote his first book, Digital Computer and Control Engineering (1960). At GWU, Ledley acquired the Florida Automatic Computer I and II, two descendants of SEAC that had been discarded by the U.S. Air Force as surplus, for the purpose of establishing a "computation center" that would use the computers to automate Frederick Sanger's process of determining the amino acid sequence of proteins. The center was never built, however, because the National Institutes of Health rejected Ledley's request for a grant to fund it, and because the university balked at the prospect of installing and supporting the two enormous computers.

=== Collaboration with Lee B. Lusted ===
Lee B. Lusted (1922-1994), a radiologist with a background in electrical engineering, became aware of Ledley's work in 1956 after Ledley gave a presentation titled "An Operations-Research View of Medicine and Health" to the annual meeting of the Operations Research Society of America. After the meeting, Lusted telephoned Ledley, and the two found that they shared a strong interest in using electronics and mathematics to improve medicine. The two men immediately began to collaborate on developing ways to teach physicians and biomedical researchers, who rarely had much training in electronics or mathematics, to use electronic digital computers in their work.

In 1959, Ledley and Lusted published "Reasoning Foundations of Medical Diagnosis," a widely read article in Science, which introduced operations research techniques to medical workers. Areas covered included: symbolic logic, Bayes' theorem (probability), and value theory. In the article, physicians were instructed how to create diagnostic databases using edge-notched cards to prepare for a time when they would have the opportunity to enter their data into electronic computers for analysis. Ledley and Lusted expressed hope that by harnessing computers, much of physicians' work would become automated and that many human errors could therefore be avoided.

Within medicine, Ledley and Lusted's article has remained influential for decades, especially within the field of medical decision making. Among its most enthusiastic readers was cardiologist Homer R. Warner, who emulated Ledley and Lusted's methods at his research clinic at LDS Hospital in Utah. Warner's work, in turn, shaped many of the practices and priorities of the heavily computerized Intermountain Healthcare, Inc., which was in 2009 portrayed by the Obama administration as an exemplary model of a healthcare system that provided high-quality and low-cost care.

The article also brought national media attention to Ledley and Lusted's work. Articles about the work of the two men ran in several major U.S. newspapers. A small demonstration device Ledley built to show how electronic diagnosis would work was described in the New York World Telegram as a "A Metal Brain for Diagnosis," while the New York Post ran a headline: "Dr. Univac Wanted in Surgery." On several occasions, Ledley and Lusted explained to journalists that they believed that computers would aid physicians rather than replace them, and that the process of introducing computers to medicine would be very challenging due to the non-quantitative nature of much medical information. They also envisioned, years before the development of ARPANET, a national network of medical computers that would allow healthcare providers to create a nationally accessible medical record for each American and would allow rapid mass data analysis as information was gathered by individual clinics and sent to regional and national computer centers.

=== NAS-NRC survey and computer advocacy ===
In early 1957, Ledley was hired on a part-time basis by the National Academy of Sciences - National Research Council (NAS-NRC) to conduct a national survey of current and potential computer use in biology and medicine in the United States. Supported by Senator Hubert Humphrey and NIH Director James A. Shannon, the NAS-NRC commissioned the survey in an effort to help physicians and life scientists overcome their reluctance to use computers.

Ledley published his survey findings in a November 6, 1959 Science article, "Digital Electronic Computers in Biomedical Science," in which he called on biologists to train in mathematics and engineering in order to effectively use electronic digital computers. He predicted that in the long run, "perhaps the greatest utilization of computers will be in biomedical applications." Like the earlier Science article co-authored with Lusted, Ledley's new piece was widely read – among its most influential and enthusiastic readers was Joshua Lederberg, who spent much of the later part of his career using computers to solve problems in biology research.

Ledley's survey and article also shaped the National Institutes of Health's first major effort to encourage biomedical researchers to use computers. This effort began shortly after the Soviet launch of Sputnik in October 1957—in reaction to Sputnik, the U.S. Congress sought means boost U.S. scientific and technological productivity. Beginning in 1960, Congress allocated roughly $40 million to the NIH for the purpose of stimulating computer use in biomedical research. Ledley's survey recommendations, particularly his call for biomedical workers to train extensively in mathematics and engineering, served as a guide for the NIH effort, which was carried out by the NIH's Advisory Committee on Computers in Research (ACCR). The ACCR was led from 1960 to 1964 by Ledley's collaborator, Lee Lusted. During those years, the committee established several major biomedical computing centers around the U.S. and sponsored the development of the LINC. The ACCR's successor, the Computers in Research Study Section, was headed by Homer Warner, one of the first research physicians to employ Ledley and Lusted's techniques in a clinical setting.

== National Biomedical Research Foundation ==
=== Establishment and goals of the NBRF ===
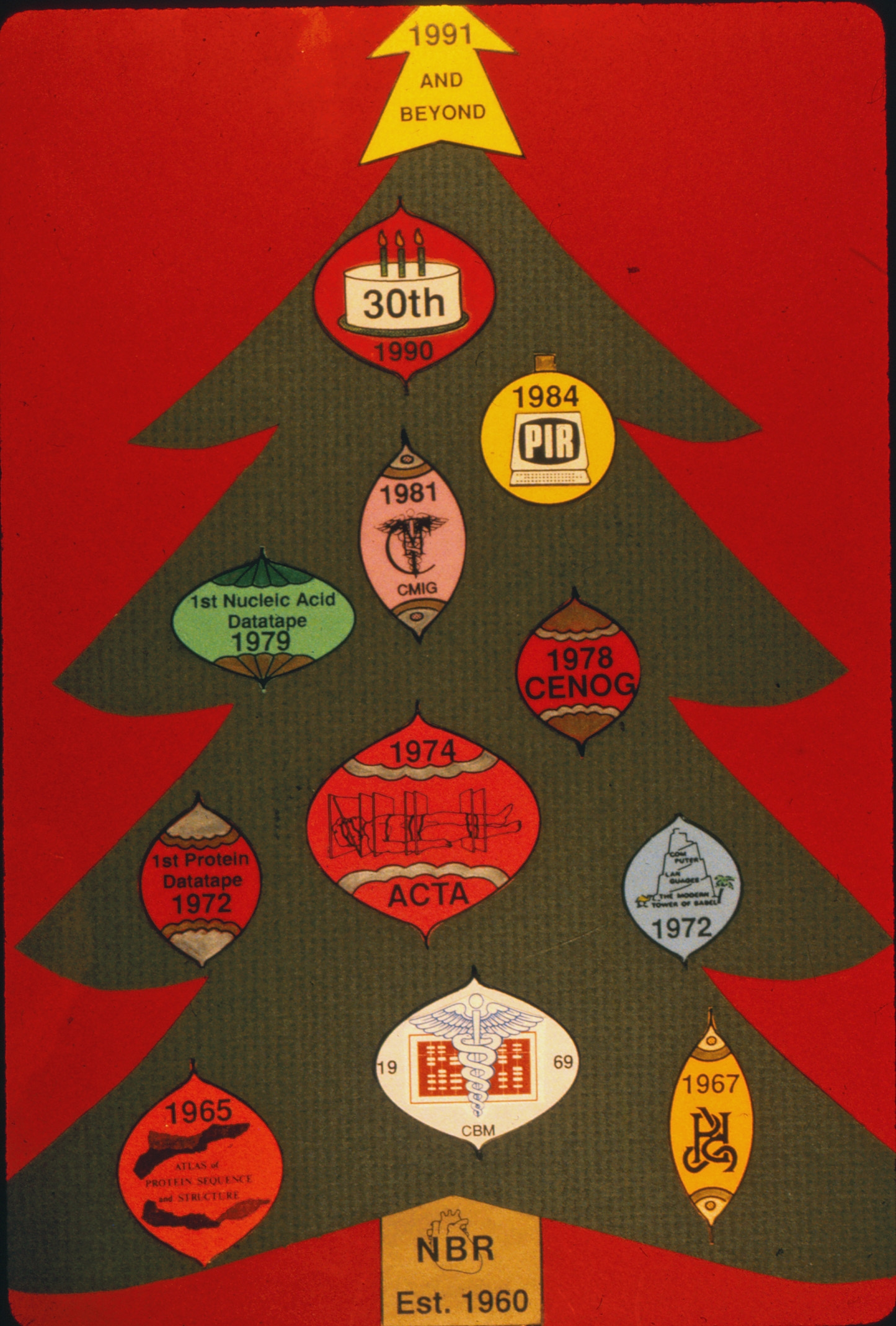
NBRF "Christmas Tree" showing projects and journals initiated by the organization up to 1991. At the base is the establishment of the foundation in 1960. The ornaments represent (moving from bottom to top and from left to right): the Atlas of Protein Sequence and Structure (initiated in 1965), Computers in Biology and Medicine (journal founded in 1969), Pattern Recognition (journal founded in 1967), first protein datatape (1972), ACTA (prototype built 1974), Computer Languages (journal founded in 1972), first nucleic acid datatape (1979), Computerized Medical Imaging and Graphics (journal founded in 1981 -- this grew out of the 1976 journal Computerized Tomography and the 1977 journal Computerized Radiology), CENOG (prototype built 1978), Protein Information Resource (launched in 1984), 1990 was the NBRF's 30th year.

Following his survey work for the NAS-NRC and the publication of his and Lusted's articles in Science, Ledley sought federal government and university support his efforts to development computers and computer programs for use by biomedical researchers. With the support of the NAS-NRC, Ledley chartered in 1960 the National Biomedical Research Foundation (NBRF), a nonprofit organization, initially based in an NAS-NRC-owned building near Dupont Circle, Washington, D.C.

Believing that his career as a university faculty member would ultimately constrain his research, Ledley left his position at GWU in order to dedicate his full-time to running the NBRF. Ledley would lead the NBRF until his retirement in 2010. Early employees included: Louis S. Rotolo (Ledley's assistant in the NAS-NRC survey), James B. Wilson (Ledley's former graduate student at GWU), and Margaret O. Dayhoff (a quantum chemist with a Ph.D. from Columbia and Ledley's childhood friend from Flushing).

Grounded in Ledley's belief that computer use would substantially improve biology and medicine by helping to mathematize those areas, the NBRF's mission was to "stimulate biomedical research scientists to utilize computers by setting an example through its own pioneering research and development in new areas of computer applications." Starting with an annual budget of under $100,000 and a half-dozen employees, the NBRF grew into a multimillion-dollar operation with more than 20 employees by the early 1980s. Initially the vast majority of NBRF's support came from the NIH, but by 1980 it drew support from a variety of federal, university, and corporate sources, in addition to generating revenue through the publication of journals and the sale of electronic instruments, software, and patents.

In 1970, the NBRF began its affiliation with the Georgetown University Medical Center. The university, which had allocated space for a biomedical computing facility that had never been built, provided office and laboratory space for the NBRF, while the NBRF would serve as a computing resource for the university as well as bring funding and prestige to the university through its research and development activities.

As part of the move, Ledley was appointed to Georgetown University's faculty as a professor of radiology, physiology, and biophysics. The NBRF was physically located at Georgetown from 1970 to 2006. Between 2006 and 2010 it was based in offices in Washington, D.C. and Bethesda, MD.

In 2011, the NBRF was reincorporated in Massachusetts and has adopted a new mission statement.

=== FIDAC and pattern recognition ===
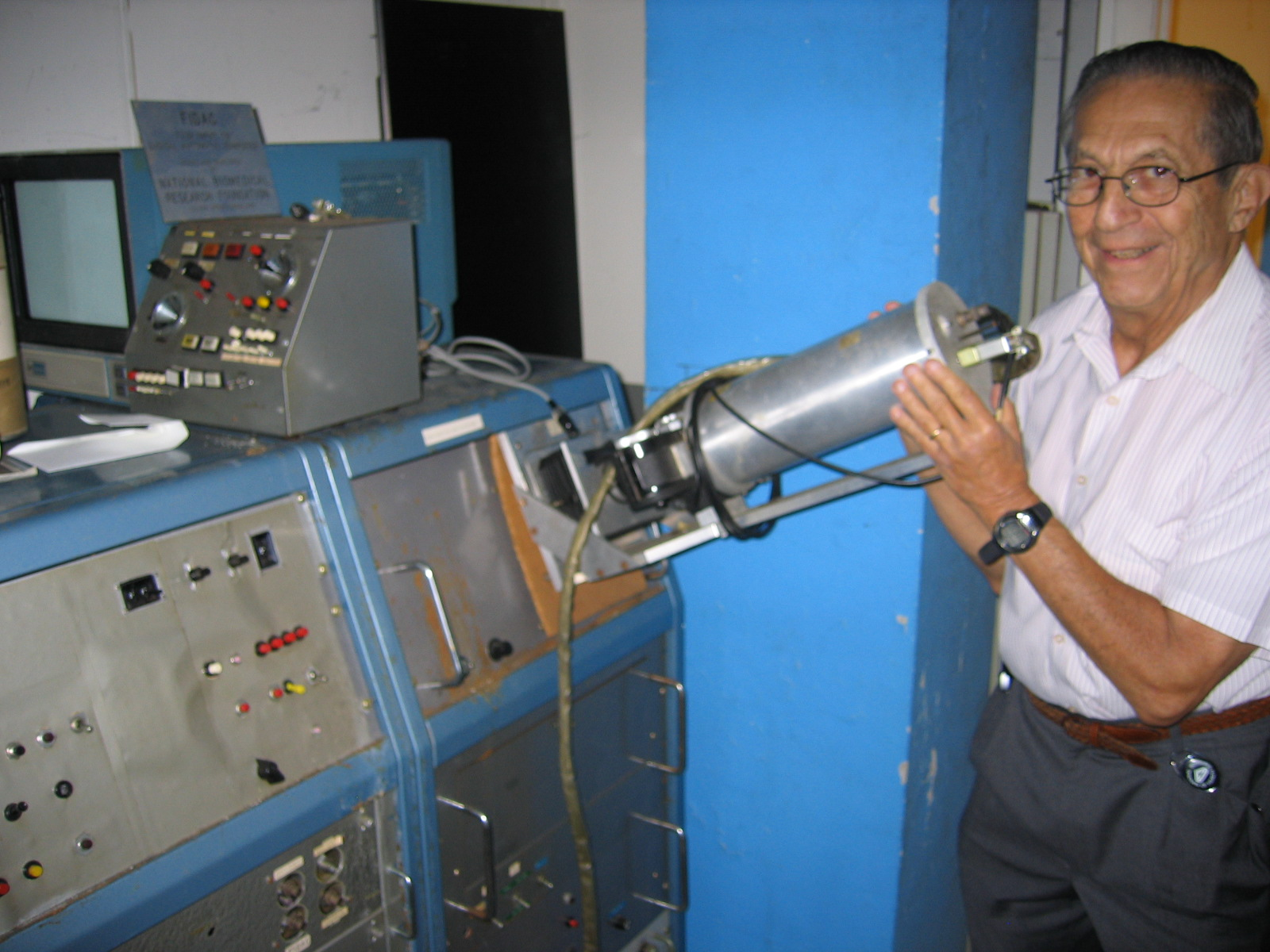
Robert Ledley pictured with FIDAC in 2007.

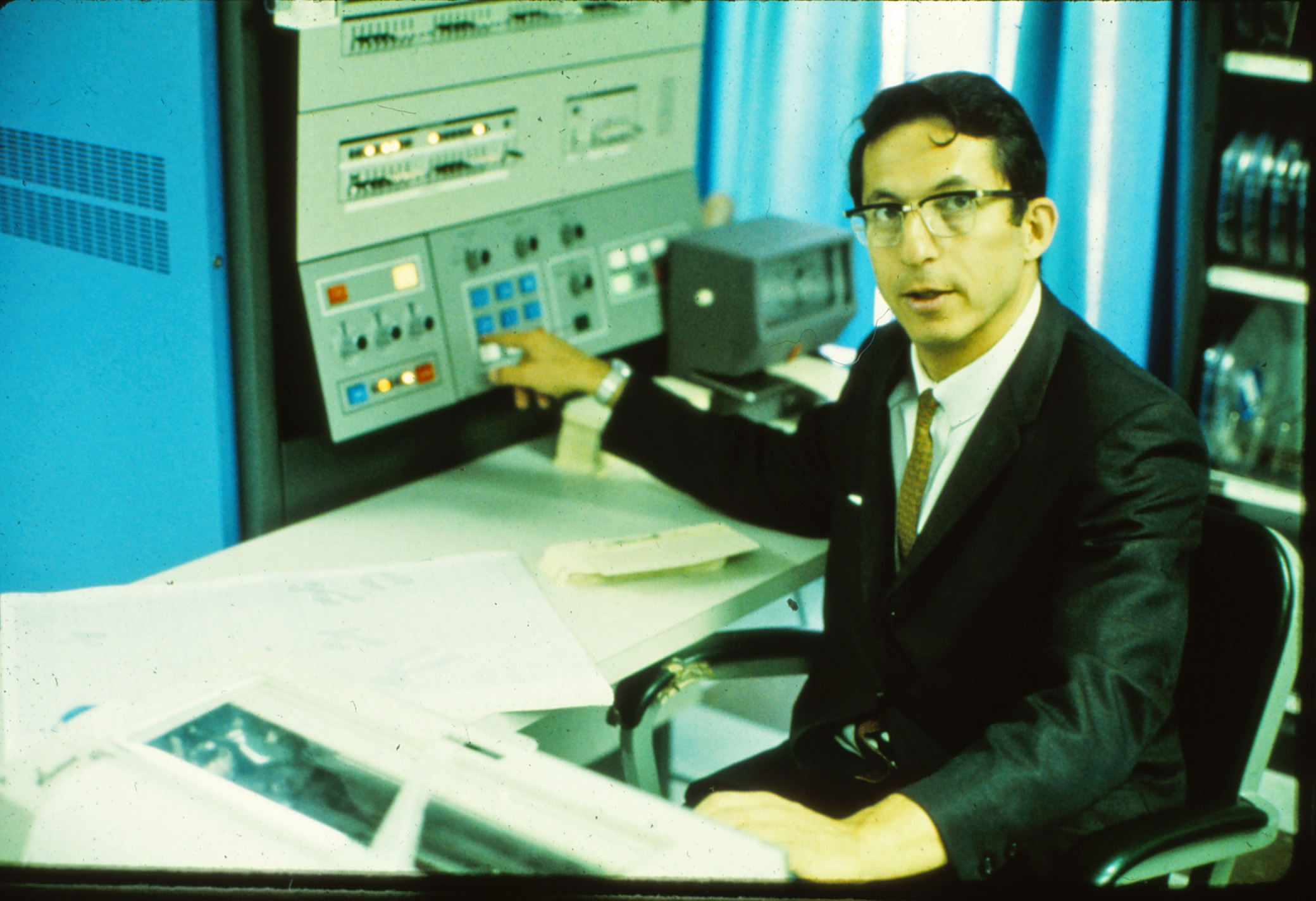
Robert Ledley posing with an IBM 360 that was used in conjunction with FIDAC. The sheets of paper on the left side of the photograph are printouts of digitized chromosome micrographs. Stacks of IBM punched cards are present near Ledley's right arm.

The NBRF's earliest area of emphasis was developing optical pattern recognition technology. Working with Wilson in 1960 and 1961, Ledley built the Automatic Device for Antibiotic Determination (ADAD), a computerized light-measuring device that tested for efficacy of antibiotic drugs by measuring transparency in petri dish cultures. Areas that were transparent were likely areas where the antibiotics had killed the bacterial populations; areas that were opaque likely areas where the bacteria were still alive. The NBRF sold several ADAD units to the Food and Drug Administration, and to large pharmaceutical companies.

Building on the success of ADAD, Ledley, Wilson, and a newcomer to the NBRF, electrical engineer Thomas Golab, developed the Film Input to Digital Automatic Computer (FIDAC) in the mid-1960s. FIDAC was designed to scan a photograph into its memory and then send that information to a larger computer (e.g. IBM 360) in order to recognize patterns in the scanned image. To digitize a photograph, FIDAC would impose a 700 x 500 point grid (of arbitrary size) onto it and then measure the light level at each point. Depending on the light level detected at it, each point was assigned an integer ranging from 0 to 9. FIDAC could generate a 350,000-point scan in under 0.5 seconds.

Ledley designed FIDAC to scan photomicrographs of chromosomes in order to automate the labor-intensive task of karyotype analysis, which is used to detect conditions such as Turner syndrome and Down syndrome. Once programmed to distinguish chromosomes from the background and then to recognize abnormalities in a given sample (e.g. the presence of extra chromosome(s), abnormally-shaped chromosome(s)), FIDAC could perform in 40 seconds a chromosome analysis that took a skilled technician 15 minutes to complete by hand.

Beyond chromosome analysis, FIDAC was adapted to digitize and analyze photographs of neurons and Pap smears as well as schlieren photographs. About a dozen FIDAC units were sold during the 1960s, and by the early 1970s there was considerable demand for a smaller version of the machine. Ultimately the Jet Propulsion Laboratory was awarded an NIH grant to develop a small, FIDAC-like instrument for use in laboratories and clinics.

To facilitate discussion among users and developers of FIDAC, Ledley founded in 1969 the peer-reviewed journal Pattern Recognition, the official journal of the Pattern Recognition Society. Ledley remained the editor of Pattern Recognition until 2010.

=== ACTA and computerized tomography (CT/CAT scanning) ===
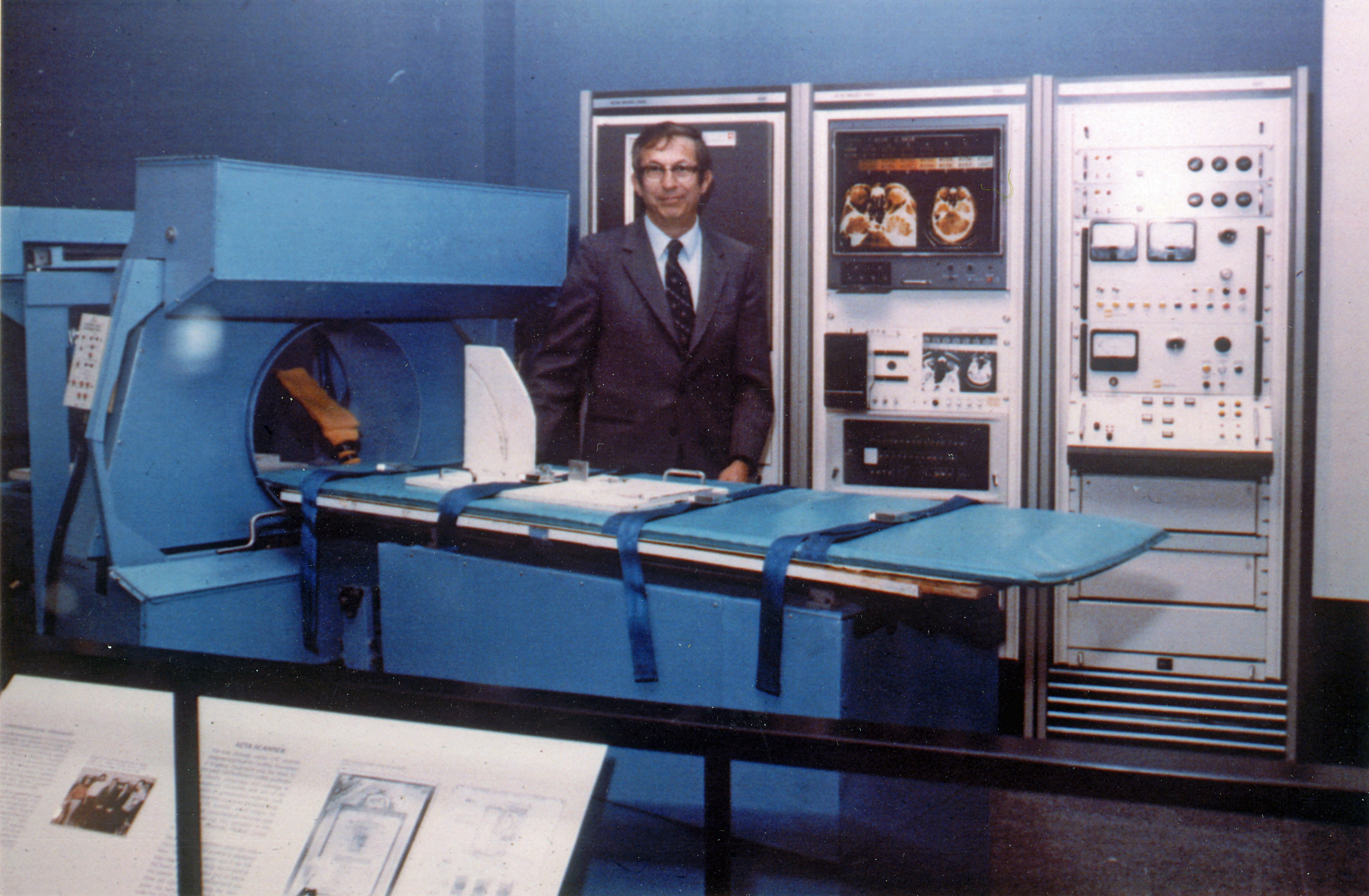
Robert Ledley at the exhibit of the ACTA whole-body CT scanner at the Smithsonian's National Museum of American History.

Ledley is most widely known for his 1970s efforts to develop computerized tomography (CT) or CAT scanners. This work began in 1973, when the NBRF lost most of its NIH funding due to federal budget cuts. During this time, the NBRF had also become increasingly involved in on-campus computing projects. Quickly trying to raise enough funds to cover the NBRF employee salaries, Ledley looked for projects the organization could undertake for Georgetown University. After learning that Georgetown research physicians were frustrated by the $500,000 (equivalent to $3,626,312 in 2025) cost of a CT scanner they wished to buy from EMI (EMI-Scanner), Ledley promised them that the NBRF could build a similar machine for only half the price. The university agreed to give Ledley a chance, and for the next several months a team led by Ledley, Golab, Wilson, and Frank Rabbitt, worked to develop a prototype.

Aside from reducing cost, the NBRF team aimed to overcome the major constraint of the EMI-Scanner, namely that it required X-rays to be shone through a water tank enclosing the object being scanned—this constraint limited the use of the scanner to only patients' heads and required physicians to place patients' heads into a rubber bladder extending into a water tank. Building on their experience in medical imaging, and working with Godfrey Hounsfield's early designs for the EMI machine as well as the theoretical papers of Allan McLeod Cormack and William H. Oldendorf, the NBRF team concluded that the necessity of using a water tank could be eliminated by changing the algorithm used to assemble X-rays into a tomographic image. Unlike the EMI's head-only scanner, which used a relaxation algorithm, the NBRF machine used a convolution algorithm.

In 1974, after several months of working with Georgetown's machinists and auto body specialists at a nearby Cadillac dealer, Ledley's team completed construction of the Automatic Computerized Transverse Axial (ACTA) scanner. The machine had 30 photomultiplier tubes as detectors and completed a scan in 9 translate/rotate cycles, much faster than the EMI-scanner. It used a DEC PDP-11/34 minicomputer both to operate the servo-mechanisms and to acquire and process the images. Most importantly, ACTA could scan the entire body, whereas the EMI-scanner could only scan the head.

ACTA was immediately successful at Georgetown. Late in the prototype's development, David C. McCullough, a pediatric neurosurgeon at Georgetown University Hospital used ACTA—without Ledley's knowledge—to examine a child who hit his head in a bicycle accident. McCullough used the machine to detect brain bleeding in the boy and the precise information about the location of the bleeding to quickly plan and perform life-saving surgery. News of this and other similar cases spread quickly and Ledley soon faced worldwide demand for machines like ACTA.

Ledley established Digital Information Science Corporation (DISCO) in 1974, which sold the ACTA scanners for $300,000 each. On November 25, 1975, Ledley was issued the patent for the design of ACTA. Later in 1975, DISCO sold the ACTA rights to Pfizer for $1.5 million in cash and $10 million in guaranteed research funding (paid out over 10 years) for the NBRF. Pfizer's ACTA 0100 and its successor, the 200FS, were sold to hospitals worldwide between 1975 and 1977, but Pfizer lost the medical imaging market to GE Medical and Technicare, which both sold next-generation CT scanners. In 1981, Pfizer sold its CT business to Elscint.

As the use of CT scanners became widespread, Ledley rose to considerable prominence. The ACTA prototype was displayed at the Smithsonian's National Museum of American History, in Washington, D.C.. The Smithsonian also established an archive for materials related to the development of ACTA. For his role in developing ACTA, Ledley was inducted into the National Inventors Hall of Fame in 1990 and was awarded the National Medal of Technology and Innovation in 1997.

=== Bioinformatics ===
Alongside Ledley's work on imaging technology, his NBRF colleague Margaret Oakley Dayhoff was developing resources for the study of life on the molecular level. Her 1965 Atlas of Protein Sequence and Structure sought to provide a comprehensive collection of the scientific community's data on protein sequencing. Published annually by the NBRF, first on paper then (as the volume of information grew much larger) on magnetic tape and finally on CD-ROM, the Atlas served as an information clearinghouse for the growing community of protein sequencers. By the mid-1970s the Atlas had become the primary repository of protein sequence data, and ultimately served as a model for the Protein Data Bank and the nucleic acid sequence database GenBank, both now major resources for biologists.

After Dayhoff died suddenly in 1983, Ledley and Winona Barker (who joined the NBRF in the late 1960s) took charge of the project. During the mid-1980s Ledley and Barker led a team that developed the Protein Identification Resource (later called the Protein Information Resource or PIR), an online version of the Atlas. Researchers using modems or Tymnet could access the PIR to look up sequence information or add to the collection. As of 2012, the PIR remains an important resource for biologists; it is managed jointly by the University of Delaware and Georgetown University, and is a major component of UniProt.

=== Other NBRF computing projects ===
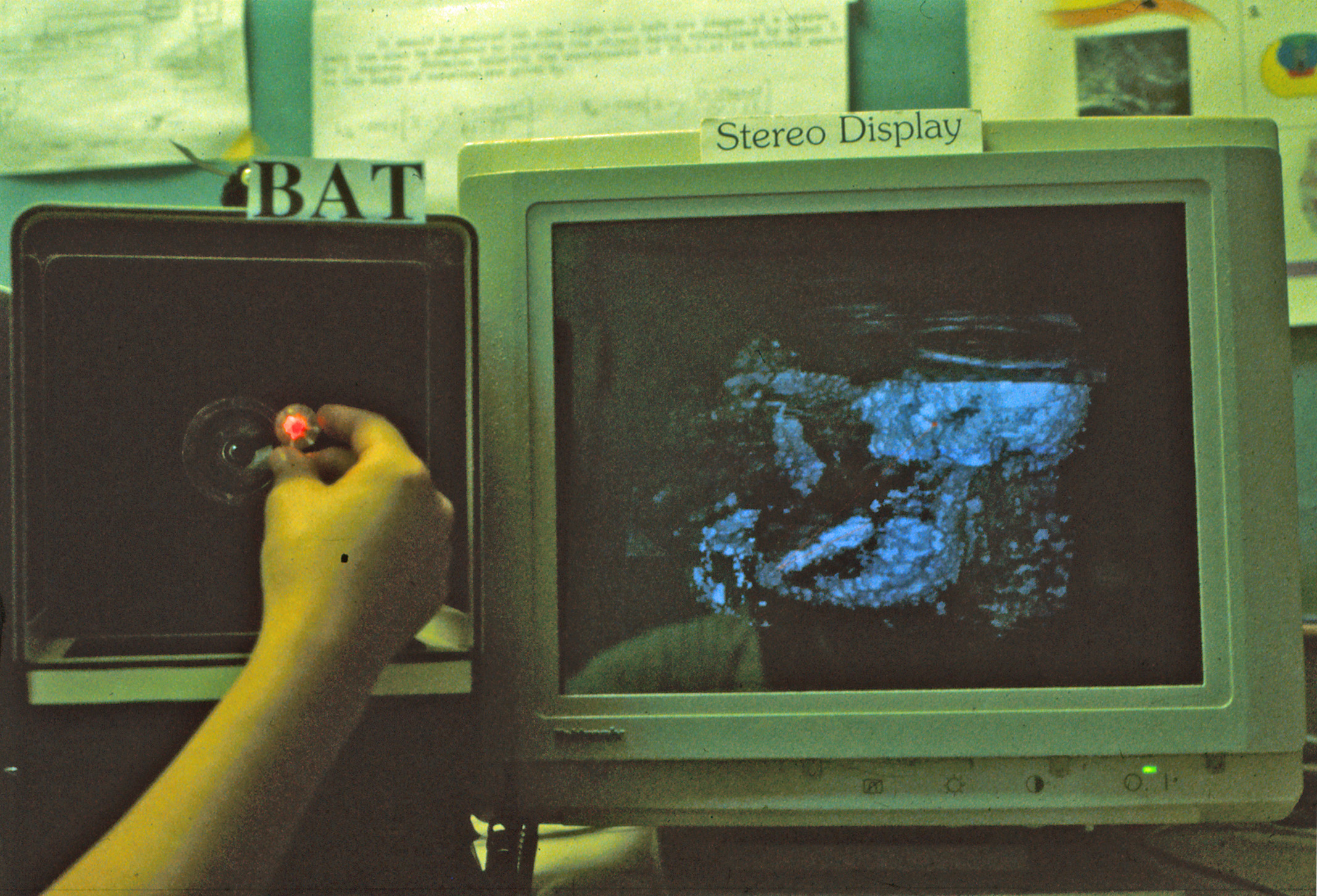
The NBRF "Bat," a 3-D mouse (left) used for interacting with stereo images (right).

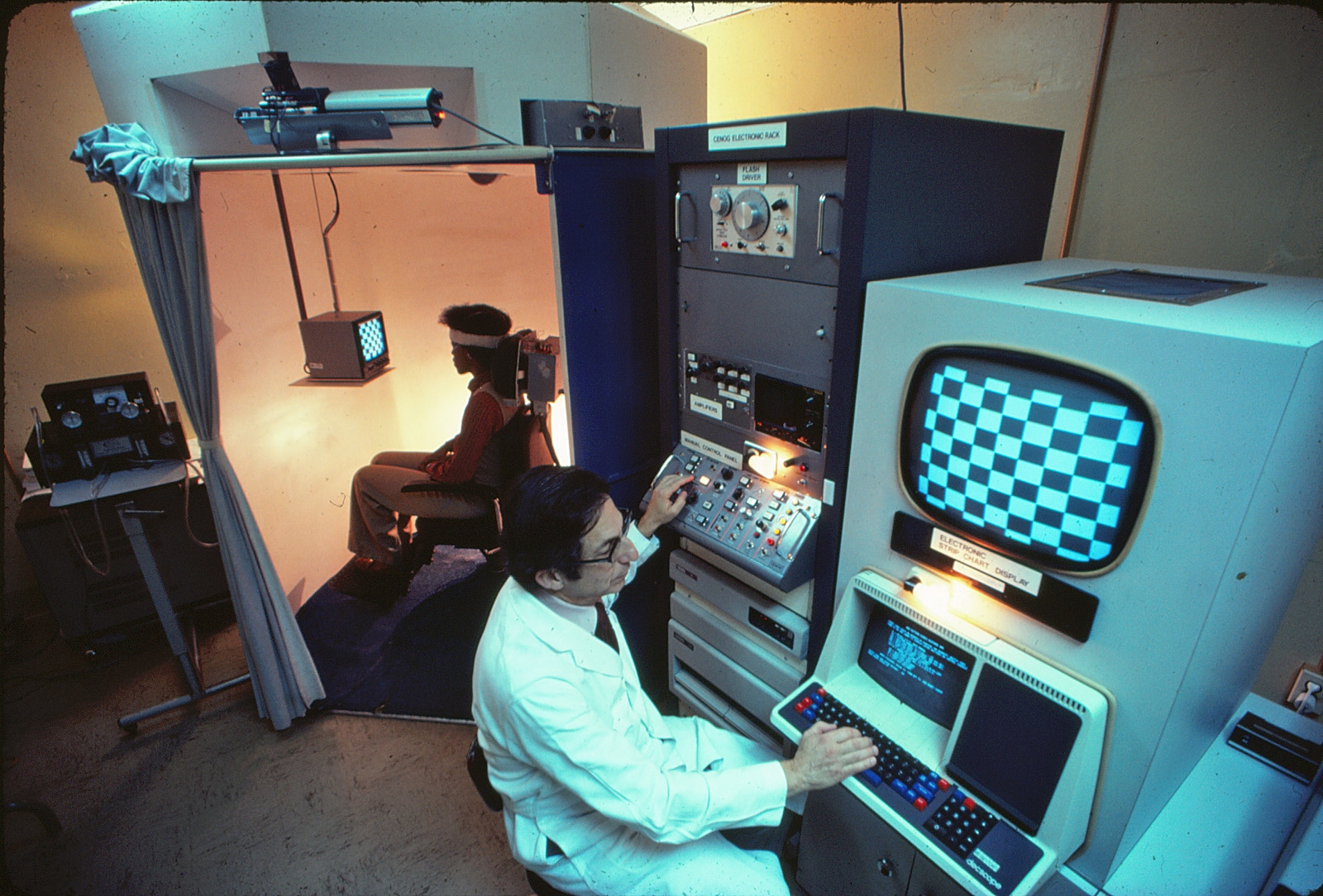
Robert Ledley operating CENOG at the NBRF circa 1980.

From 1979 to 1980, Ledley and Golab developed the Computerized Electro Neuro Ophthalmograph (CENOG). This machine enabled healthcare providers to automatically analyze ocular motility, an important factor in the diagnosis of neurological and ophthalmic disorders. CENOG generated considerable media attention in the early 1980s, largely because it served as a demonstration of the feasibility of automated medical diagnosis.

While at the NBRF, Ledley also carried out work related to computer design. In 1970, when Moore's Law was still a relatively new idea, and when the most powerful computers had 1,000 to 2,000 logic gates, Ledley wrote a paper titled "Realization of a Billion-Gate Computer" in which he speculated on the capabilities of a transistorized computer that had 1,000,000,000 logic gates. He proposed that such a machine would: 1) have no fixed logic design; 2) be capable of redesign some of its own components; 3) be able to "self-heal." Billion-transistor microprocessors have been commonplace in personal computers since 2010, though these machines are not as dynamic (in terms of logic structure) as Ledley had predicted.

In the late 1980s, Ledley lead the team that developed the Bat, a three-dimensional mouse that allowed users to interact with objects in three-dimensional space (generated using stereo images).

== Scientific journals ==
During his long career at the NBRF, Ledley served as editor of four major peer-reviewed journals. In 1969, he launched the Pattern Recognition Journal and Computers in Biology and Medicine. The former focuses on computerized approaches to pattern recognition, while the latter publishes articles, algorithms, and technical descriptions related to the use of computers in biomedicine. In 1972, Ledley started Computer Languages, Systems and Structures, the mission of which is to publish "papers on all aspects of the design, implementation and use of programming languages, from theory to practice." In 1976, following the success of ACTA, Ledley initiated Computerized Tomography, which was renamed Computerized Radiology in 1977, and subsequently renamed Computerized Medical Imaging and Graphics in 1981. It serves as "a source for the exchange of information concerning the medical use of new developments in imaging diagnosis, intervention, and follow up." Ledley served as editor of all four journals until his retirement in 2010. The journals are currently published by Elsevier.

== Honors, memberships, and affiliations ==
- Morris F. Collen Award of Excellence, American College of Medical Informatics (AMIA) (1998)
- National Inventors Hall of Fame (inducted 1990)
- National Medal of Technology (1997)
- Vicennial Gold Medal for Distinguished Service, Georgetown University (1990)
- Member, Institute of Medicine, National Academy of Sciences (1999)
- Distinguished Alumnus, New York University (1999)

== Publications ==
- Ledley, Robert Steven; Lusted, Lee B. (July 3, 1959). "Reasoning Foundations of Medical Diagnosis". Science. 130 (3366): 9–21. Bibcode:1959Sci...130....9L. doi:10.1126/science.130.3366.9. JSTOR 1758070. PMID 13668531.
- Ledley, Robert Steven (November 6, 1959). "Digital Electronic Computers in Biomedical Science". Science. 130 (3384): 1225–1234. Bibcode:1959Sci...130.1225L. doi:10.1126/science.130.3384.1225. JSTOR 1757193. PMID 14415153.
- Ledley, Robert Steven (1959). Report on the Use of Computers in Biology and Medicine. Washington, D.C.: National Academy of Sciences. ISBN 978-0-217-75214-5. (General Books, 2010).
- Ledley, Robert Steven; Rotolo, Louis S.; Wilson, James Bruce (1960). Digital Computer and Control Engineering (PDF). McGraw-Hill Electrical and Electronic Engineering Series (1 ed.). New York: McGraw-Hill Book Company, Inc. (printer: The Maple Press Company, York, Pennsylvania, USA). ISBN 0-07036981-X. ISSN 2574-7916. LCCN 59015055. OCLC 1033638267. OL 5776493M. SBN 07036981-X. . ark:/13960/t72v3b312. Archived (PDF) from the original on February 19, 2021. (xxiv+835+1 pages)
- Ledley, Robert Steven; Lusted, Lee B. (1960). "Computers in Medical Data Processing". Operations Research. 8 (3): 299–310. doi:10.1287/opre.8.3.299. JSTOR 167094.
- Ledley, Robert Steven (1962). Programming and Utilizing Digital Computers. New York: McGraw-Hill. ISBN 978-0-070-36982-5.
- Ledley, Robert Steven (1965). Use of computers in Biology and Medicine. New York: McGraw-Hill.
- Ledley, Robert Steven (1966). FORTRAN IV Programming. New York: McGraw-Hill.
- Ledley, Robert Steven (July 1970). "Realization of a Billion-Gate Computer". NBRF Technical Report. Archived from the original on March 4, 2016.
- Ledley, Robert Steven; Huang, H. K.; Mazzioti, J. C., eds. (1977). Cross-Sectional Anatomy: An Atlas for Computerized Tomography. Baltimore, Maryland: Williams & Wilkins. ISBN 978-0-683-04920-6.
