= Heimar de Fátima Marin =

Brazilian nurse

- Born: Brazil
- Education: Universidade Federal de São Paulo
- Known for: Nursing informatics Health informatics
- Scientific career
- Fields: Nursing informatics
- Workplaces: Harvard Medical School; Universidade Federal de São Paulo; Brazilian Society for Health Informatics

Heimar de Fátima Marin is a nurse and a full professor at the Federal University of São Paulo (UNIFESP).

== Career ==
In 2004 she was elected international member at the American College of Medical Informatics. Heimar Marin was also the president of Brazilian Society of Health Informatics (2002–2008); vice-chair and elected chair (2009–2012) of the International Medical Informatics Association Nursing Informatics Special Interest Group (IMIA NI SIG).

Professor Marin holds a position as visiting professor at Decision Systems Group at Harvard Medical School. She has over 250 publications. As a professor, she has mentored over 30 Ph.D. students, 40 master students, and 120 specialists in health and nursing informatics. Marin is a graduate of Nursing and has a master's degree and doctoral degree in health informatics at UNIFESP. She is “Livre-Docente” at the São Paulo Medical School, State University of São Paulo (FM-USP). In 2006, she became Full Professor and Director of the Graduate Program in Health Informatics at Federal University of São Paulo (UNIFESP). She was a fellow in Clinical Computing at the Center for Clinical Computing at Harvard Medical School. Dr Marin is currently the Editor-in-Chief of the International Journal of Medical Informatics (Elsevier), Alumni Professor at UNIFESP, Consultant for WHO-EURO and Hospital Alemão Oswaldo Cruz. She is also the Scientific Coordinator of the ICT in Health Research for the Brazilian Network Information Center (NIC.BR).

== Publications ==
=== Books ===
- Marin, Heimar (2001). Building Standard-Based Nursing Information Systems. Geneva: World Health Organization. ISBN 9275123640.

=== Journal articles ===
- Google Scholar publications
- Medline (Pubmed) publications
