= Yu-Chuan Jack Li =

Taiwanese medical researcher

- 李友專
- Born: Taipei City, Taiwan
- Education: Taipei Medical University (MD); University of Utah (PhD)
- Title: Distinguished Professor
- Website: www.jackli.cc

Yu-Chuan Jack Li (Chinese: 李友專; Wade–Giles: Li Yu-chuan) is a Taiwanese physician who is the founder of Biomedical Informatics education and research institute.

== Education ==
Li graduated from Taipei Medical University with a Doctor of Medicine (M.D.) and completed graduate studies in the United States, where he earned his Ph.D. from the University of Utah.

== Academic career ==
Li was the founding dean of the College of Medical Science and Technology at Taipei Medical University (TMU) in 2011. The college composed of the original Department of Biomedical Informatics, the Department of Medical Laboratory Science and Biotechnology, the Department of Cancer Biology and Drug Discovery, the Department of Medical Neuroscience and the Department of Translational Science. Li also founded the International Center for Health Information Technology at TMU in 2015 to foster global awareness and international collaboration in healthcare. He has been the principal investigator of many national projects related to translational Biomedical Informatics, Patient Safety, and Artificial Intelligence.

Li was elected as a Fellow of the Australian College of Health Informatics in 2009, the American College of Medical Informatics in 2010, and the International Academy of Health Science Informatics in 2017.
