= Donald A. B. Lindberg =

Director of the US National Library of Medicine

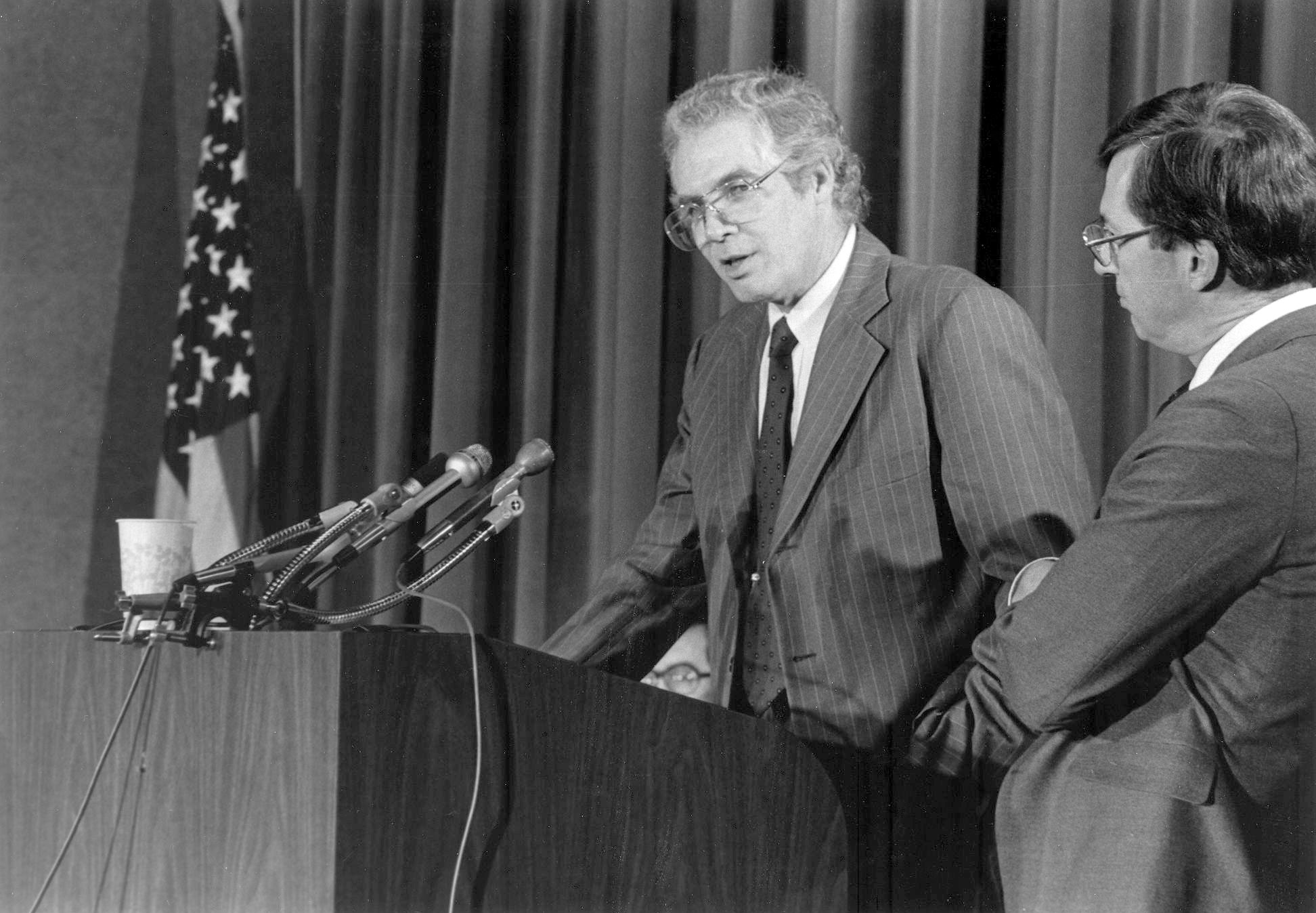
- Lindberg answering questions at the PDQ Press Conference 1985
- Born: Donald Allen Bror Lindberg; September 21, 1933; New York City, U.S.
- Died: August 17, 2019 (aged 85); Bethesda, Maryland, U.S.
- Education: Poly Prep Country Day School
- Alma mater: Amherst College; Columbia University
- Scientific career
- Fields: medical computing
- Institutions: United States National Library of Medicine

Donald Allen Bror Lindberg (September 21, 1933 – August 17, 2019) was the Director of the United States National Library of Medicine from 1984 until his retirement in 2015. He was known for his work in medical computing, especially the development of PubMed. He won the 1997 Morris F. Collen Award from the American College of Medical Informatics.

== Biography ==
Lindberg grew up in Brooklyn. He graduated from the Poly Prep Country Day School. He went on to graduate from Amherst College in applied mathematics magna cum laude in 1954. He received his M.D. from Columbia University in 1958. Between 1958 and 1960, he completed an internship and residency in pathology at Columbia Presbyterian Medical Center.

In 1960 he joined the University of Missouri becoming a faculty member at the University of Missouri School of Medicine where he developed a distinguished career, pioneering health care applications of computer technology and informatics for medicine.

He played a valuable role in establishing the American Medical Informatics Association and served as founding president.

The NIH's in memoriam letter recognized Dr. Lindberg for his "notable global contributions to information and computer science activities for information used in medical diagnosis, artificial intelligence, and educational programs, in the process fundamentally changing the way biomedical information is collected, shared, and analyzed. He will be remembered for his outstanding leadership, his vision and passion for transforming access to medical information, and as a civil servant who was committed to excellence, transparency, integrity, and public trust."

Lindberg died on August 17, 2019.
