= European Federation for Medical Informatics =

The European Federation for Medical Informatics (EFMI) is a non-profit organization, which was conceived at a meeting, assisted by the Regional Office for Europe of the World Health Organization (WHO), in Copenhagen, (Denmark, Europe), in September 1976.

== Objectives ==
The EFMI wants to:

- advance international co-operation and dissemination of information in Medical Informatics in Europe
- promote high standards in the application of medical informatics
- promote research and development in medical informatics
- encourage high standards in education in medical informatics
- function as the autonomous European Regional Council of the International Medical Informatics Association (IMIA)

== Organizations ==
- Working Group Medical Informatics (AKMI) of the Austrian Society for Biomedical Engineering ÖGBMT) and of the Austrian Computer Society (OCG) (Austria)
- Belgian Medical Informatics Association (Belgium)
- Society for Medical Informatics of Bosnia & Herzegovina (Bosnia-Herzegovina)
- Croatian Society for Medical Informatics (Croatia)
- The Cyprus Society of Medical Informatics (Cyprus)
- Czech Society for Biomedical Engineering and Medical Informatics (Czech Republic)
- The Danish Society for Medical Informatics (Denmark)
- Finnish Social and Health Informatics Association (FinnSHIA) (Finland)
- French Medical Informatics Association (AIM) (France)
- German Association for Medical Informatics, Biometry and Epidemiology (Germany)
- Greek Health Informatics Association (Greece)
- National Institute for Strategic Health Research (Hungary)
- Icelandic Society of Information Processing (Iceland)
- Healthcare Informatics Society of Ireland (Ireland)
- The Israeli Association for Medical Informatics (Israel)
- Italian Medical Informatics Society (AIIM) (Italy)
- State Medical and Pharmaceutical University "N. Testemitanu" (Moldova, Republic of)
- VMBI, Society for Healthcare Informatics (Netherlands)
- Norwegian Society for Medical Informatics (Norway)
- The Technical University of Lodz (Politechnika Łódzka) (Poland)
- Faculty of Medicine of Oporto University (Portugal)
- Portuguese Medical Informatics Association (E-Mais) (Portugal)
- Romanian Society of Medical Informatics (Romania)
- N. N. Burdenko Neurosurgical Institute (Russian Federation)
- Association for Medical Informatics of Serbia (Serbia)
- Slovenian Medical Informatics Association (SIMIA) (Slovenia)
- Spanish Society of Health Informatics (Spain)
- Swedish Federation for Medical Informatics (SFMI) (Sweden)
- Swiss Society for Medical Informatics (Switzerland)
- Turkish Medical Informatics Association (TurkMIA) (Turkey)
- The Ukraine Association for "Computer Medicine" (UACM) (Ukraine)
- British Computer Society Health Informatics Forum (BCSHIF) (United Kingdom)

== See also ==
- European Institute for Health Records
- Health informatics
- Electronic Health Record (EHR)
- Electronic Medical Record (EMR)
