= International Medical Informatics Association =

- Abbreviation: IMIA
- Founded: 1967; 59 years ago
- Founder: IFIP, International Federation of Information Processing: Technical Committee 4
- Type: Professional association
- Legal status: Registered under Swiss Law
- Purpose: Biomedical and health informatics
- Location: Geneva, Switzerland
- Method: conferences, publications
- Members: National and Regional Associations and Universities
- President: Brigitte Seroussi (President 2023-Present)
- Key people: Elaine Huesing, (CEO, International Medical Informatics Association
- Main organ: Assembly
- Website: https://imia-medinfo.org/wp

The International Medical Informatics Association (IMIA) is an independent organization that plays a role in promoting and furthering the application of information science in modern society, particularly in the fields of healthcare, bioscience and medicine. It was established in 1967 as a technical committee of the International Federation for Information Processing (IFIP). It became an independent organization in 1987 and was established under Swiss law in 1989.

== Goals and objectives ==
- the promotion of informatics in health care and biomedical research
- the advancement of international cooperation
- the stimulation of research, development and education
- the dissemination and exchange of information

Inherent in this mission is to bring together, from a global perspective, scientists, researchers, vendors, consultants and suppliers in an environment of cooperation and sharing. The international membership network of national member societies, IMIA regions, corporate and academic institutional members, and working and special interest groups, constitute the "IMIA family".

IMIA organizes various conferences and events around the world and is currently focusing on "bridging the knowledge gap" by facilitating and providing support to developing nations. Specific goals include supporting the ongoing development of the African Region.

== Code of Ethics for Health Information Professionals ==
The International Medical Informatics Association approved the endorsement of the IMIA Code of Ethics for Health Information Professionals at its General Assembly meeting on October 4, 2002, in Taipei. The code is the culmination of several years of a global collaborative effort led by IMIA's working Group on Data Protection in Health Information, Chaired by Professor Ab Baker.

In 2016, the General Assembly approved an updated version of the Code of Ethics, which was authored by Dr. Eike-Henner W. Kluge, Professor of the Department of Philosophy at the University of Victoria in Victoria, BC, Canada.

== Membership ==
IMIA membership consists of Society, Academic and Corporate Institutional and Affiliate Members and Honorary Fellows.

== Society Members ==
- American Medical Informatics Association (AMIA)
- Argentine Association of Medical Informatics
- Australian Institute of Digital Health (AIDH)
- Working Group Medical Informatics (AKMI) of the Austrian Society for Biomedical Engineering (ÖGBMT) and of the Austrian Computer Society (OCG)
- Belgian Medical Informatics Association
- Brazilian Society of Health Informatics
- British Computer Society Health Informatics Forum
- Digital Health Canada
- Croatian Society for Medical Informatics
- Cuban Society of Medical Informatics
- Czech Society for Biomedical Engineering and Medical Informatics
- Finnish Social and Health Informatics Association (FinnSHIA)
- French Medical Informatics Association (AIM)
- German Association for Medical Informatics, Biometry and Epidemiology
- Greek Health Informatics Association
- Hong Kong Society of Medical Informatics
- John von Neumann Computer Society (Hungary)
- Indian Association for Medical Informatics
- Iranian Medical Informatics Association
- Healthcare Informatics Society of Ireland
- The Israeli Association for Medical informatics
- Ivorian Society of Biosciences and Health Informatics (ISBHI)
- Japan Association for Medical Informatics
- Korea Society of Medical Informatics (KOSMI)
- Medical Informatics Association of Malawi (MIAM)
- Malaysian Health Informatics Association (MHIA)
- The Mali Society of Biomedical and Health Information (SOMBIS)
- Health Informatics New Zealand
- Association for Health Informatics of Nigeria (AHIN)
- Norwegian Society for Medical Informatics
- Philippine Medical Informatics Society, Inc.
- Romanian Society of Medical Informatics
- The Saudi Association for Health Informatics (SAHI)
- Association for Medical and Bio-Informatics, Singapore (AMBIS)
- Slovak Society of Biomedical Engineering and Medical Informatics
- Slovenian Medical Informatics Association (SIMIA)
- South African Health Informatics Association
- Spanish Society of Health Informatics
- Swedish Federation for Medical Informatics
- Swiss Society for Medical Informatics
- Taiwan Association for Medical Informatics (TAMI)
- VMBI, Society for Healthcare Informatics (Netherlands)
- Turkish Medical Informatics Association (TURKMIA)
- The Ukrainian Association for Computer Medicine (UACM)

== Official Publications of the International Medical Informatics Association ==
- IMIA Yearbook (Schattauer Publishers Stuttgart)
- ACI - Applied Clinical Informatics (Thieme Group)
- Informatics for Health and Social Care (Taylor & Francis)
- International Journal of Medical Informatics (Elsevier)
- Methods of Information in Medicine (Thieme Group)
- BMJ Health & Care Informatics (British Medical Journal)

== Working and special interest groups ==
The IMIA family includes a growing number of Working and Special Interest Groups, which consist of individuals who share common interests in a particular focal field. The groups hold Working Conferences on leading edge and timely health and medical informatics issues.

IMIA Working Groups and Special Interest Groups include:

- Accident & Emergency Informatics
- Data Mining and Big Data Analytics
- Dental Informatics
- Ethics, Privacy and Security in Health Informatics
- Exposome Informatics
- Francophone Special Interest Group
- Health and Medical Informatics Education
- Health Informatics for Development
- Health Informatics for Patient Safety
- Health Information Systems (HIS)
- Health Record Banking
- History of BioMedical and Health Informatics
- Human Factors Engineering for Health Informatics
- Language and Meaning in Biomedicine
- Nursing Informatics Special Interest Group - IMIA NI SIG
- One Digital Health
- Open Source Health Informatics
- Organizational and Social Issues
- Participatory Health and Social Media
- Primary Health Care Informatics
- Smart Homes & Ambient Assisted Living
- Standards in Health Care Informatics
- Student & Emerging Professionals SIG
- Technology Assessment & Quality Development in Health Informatics (WG 15)
- Telehealth

== See also ==
- European Federation for Medical Informatics (EFMI)
- ISO TC 215
- MedInfo
