= List of fellows of the American College of Medical Informatics =

The American College of Medical Informatics consists of elected Fellows that have demonstrated major contributions in biomedical and health informatics, have achieved national recognition in the field, and are committed to advancing the charitable, scientific, literary and educational purposes of informatics for a sustain period of time. Each year, new fellows are elected by the voting members of ACMI. Fellows are elected for life and upon election are named Fellows of ACMI and may use the designation “FACMI”. Those for which the achievements have been documented on Wikipedia are provided below. Each person's name, and election year are given.

== Fellows ==
Stephen Altschul, PhD	2001
Russ Altman, MD, PhD	1998
Joan S. Ash, MS, MLS, MBA, PhD	2002
Bryan Bergeron, MD	1990
Patricia Flatley Brennan, RN, PhD	1993
Christopher G. Chute, MD, DrPH	1995
Fred Cohen, MD	2001
Suzanne Bakken	1997
Jerome R. Cox, Jr., ScD	1984
Don E. Detmer, MD, MA	1991
David A. Evans, PhD	1999
Edward Feigenbaum, PhD	1984
Alvan Feinstein, MD	1984
Carol Friedman, MD	1998
James Geller, PhD	2012
Paul N. Gorman, MD	2005
Lawrence Hunter, PhD	2001
Charles Jaffe, MD, PhD	2003
Robert Ledley, DDS, MS	1984
David J. Lipman, MD	2001
William Long, PhD	1992
Yves A. Lussier, MD	2005
Vimla L. Patel, PhD	1996
Genevieve Melton-Meaux, MD, PhD	2015
Eneida A. Mendonça, MD, PhD	2012
Jason H. Moore, PhD	2015
Renato Sabbatini, PhD	2020
Edward H. Shortliffe, MD, PhD	1984
Dean F. Sittig, PhD	1992
John Amsden Starkweather, PhD	1985
Umberto Tachinardi, MD, MS	2012
Cui Tao, PhD	2018
Homer R. Warner, MD, PhD	1984
Gio Wiederhold, PhD	1984
