= Allison McCoy =

American biomedical informatician

- Born: 4/30/1984
- Other names: Allison Beck McCoy, Allison Beck
- Education: Vanderbilt University; Baylor University
- Spouse(s): Jacob A. McCoy, MD, MS
- Children: 2
- Scientific career
- Fields: Biomedical Informatics
- Workplaces: University of Texas Health Science Center at Houston; Tulane University; Vanderbilt University
- Doctoral advisor: Josh F. Peterson
- Other academic advisors: Lemuel R. Waitman; Dean F. Sittig
- Website: allisonmccoy.com

Allison Beck McCoy is an American biomedical informatician focused on clinical informatics/health informatics. She is an associate professor of biomedical informatics and director of the clinical informatics core at the Vanderbilt University School of Medicine. She was elected a fellow of the American Medical Informatics Association and American College of Medical Informatics in 2018 and 2023 respectively.

== Education ==
McCoy obtained a BSCS in computer science at Baylor University in 2006, and a MS and PhD in biomedical informatics at Vanderbilt University in 2008 and 2010, respectively. Her master's thesis was titled, A System to Monitor and Improve Medication Safety in the Setting of Acute Kidney Injury. Lemuel R. Waitman was her thesis advisor. McCoy's dissertation was titled, Achieving Medication Safety during Acute Kidney Injury: The Impact of Clinical Decision Support and Real-Time Pharmacy Surveillance. Josh F. Peterson was her doctoral advisor. McCoy was a postdoctoral fellow at the University of Texas School of Biomedical Informatics under the mentorship of Dean F. Sittig. She completed AMIA Health Informatics Certification (AHIC) in 2022.

== Career ==
McCoy is a biomedical informatician specializing in applied clinical informatics. She was an assistant professor at the University of Texas School of Biomedical Informatics and at the Tulane University School of Public Health and Tropical Medicine's department of global biostatistics and data science. McCoy is an associate professor of biomedical informatics at the Vanderbilt University School of Medicine. She is the director of its clinical informatics core, director of research for the Clinical Informatics Research Collaborative (CIRCLE), and director of digital experience for the Pediatric Clinical Decision Support Collaborative (PCC). She created the Biomedical Informatics Ranking Website (Scholar Scraper), and led the Clickbusters initiative.

McCoy has published more than 100 papers and has an h-index of 33.

== Personal life ==
Allison McCoy is married to Jacob A. McCoy, MD, MS, and they have 2 children. Their son was born with a single ventricle congenital heart defect. McCoy is the Director of Scientific Community Engagement for Sisters By Heart. She is involved with the National Pediatric Quality Improvement Collaborative (NPC-QIC) as a Parent Member of the Scientific Review Committee and with Fontan Outcomes Network (FON) as the Parent Representative for Monroe Carell Jr. Children's Hospital at Vanderbilt. She has also served on the Monroe Carell Patient and Family Advisory Council.

McCoy is the daughter of colorectal surgeon David E. Beck.
