= Peter Embí =

Biomedical informatics leader and NLM Director

Peter J. Embí
- Born: Miami, Florida, U.S.
- Education: University of Florida (BS); University of South Florida (MD); Oregon Health & Science University (MS)
- Known for: Algorithmovigilance; Clinical research informatics; Real-world evidence generation; Clinical trial alerts; Data-driven learning health systems
- Scientific career
- Fields: Biomedical informatics
- Workplaces: National Library of Medicine; Vanderbilt University Medical Center; Regenstrief Institute; Indiana University; The Ohio State University; University of Cincinnati

Peter J. Embí is an American physician-scientist who has been named the fifth Director of the National Library of Medicine (NLM) at the National Institutes of Health, a position he assumes on September 10, 2026. He is a leader in biomedical informatics known as a founder of the subspecialty of clinical research informatics and for originating the concept of algorithmovigilance, the systematic evaluation and monitoring of artificial intelligence in health care. He is also credited with holding the first Chief Research Information Officer post in the United States.

Embí received a BS in microbiology and cell science from the University of Florida, an MD from the University of South Florida, and an MS in medical informatics and clinical epidemiology from Oregon Health & Science University (OHSU), where he also completed an internal medicine residency and a fellowship in biomedical informatics. His graduate thesis examined the transition from paper-based medical records to electronic health records. He subsequently completed a fellowship in rheumatology and immunology at the Cleveland Clinic.

After his training, Embí joined the faculty of the University of Cincinnati College of Medicine, where he founded the Center for Health Informatics. In 2010 he moved to The Ohio State University, serving as vice-chair of the Department of Biomedical Informatics and associate dean for research informatics, and becoming the first person in the United States to hold the title of chief research information officer, at the Ohio State University Wexner Medical Center — a role that has since become common at academic medical centers. In 2016 he was named president and chief executive officer of the Regenstrief Institute, a research organization affiliated with Indiana University focused on biomedical informatics and health services research, He concurrently served as vice president for learning health systems at IU Health and as professor and associate dean at the Indiana University School of Medicine. It was during this period that he formulated and published the concept of algorithmovigilance.

In 2022 Embí joined Vanderbilt University Medical Center (VUMC) as professor and chair of the Department of Biomedical Informatics and senior vice president for research and innovation, where he led one of the largest departments of its kind in academic medicine. He founded the ADVANCE AI Center (AI Discovery and Vigilance to Accelerate Innovation and Clinical Excellence), a hub for health artificial intelligence research and governance. He also oversaw the cloud migration of BioVU, Vanderbilt's de-identified genetic biobank. In 2025 he transitioned from some of his administrative roles in order to concentrate on national challenges in trustworthy health AI, learning health systems, and biomedical knowledge infrastructure. That work has centered on the Trustworthy and Responsible AI Network (TRAIN), the VAMOS Collaborative, and VigilAI, Inc., efforts intended to help health systems govern, monitor, and evaluate AI in real-world settings.

On September 2, 2026, NIH announced that Embí would become Director of the National Library of Medicine effective September 10, 2026, succeeding Stephen Sherry, who had served as acting director since October 2023 following the retirement of Patricia Flatley Brennan. He is the fifth person to serve as director since the institution took its present name by act of Congress in 1956, and the twentieth counting from the founding of the Library of the Surgeon General's Office in 1836. As director he oversees the world's largest biomedical library, with a workforce of approximately 1,400 and an annual budget of about $495 million, and its programs in biomedical informatics and computational health data science, genomic data repositories, and health information access.

Embí is credited as a founder of clinical research informatics, a subspecialty applying informatics to clinical and translational research. He chaired the scientific program for the inaugural AMIA Summit on Clinical Research Informatics, published foundational works defining the domain, and received the AMIA Leadership Award in 2011. He has also received AMIA's William W. Stead Award for Thought Leadership. He also developed the first online course in the field in collaboration with AMIA, and from 2011 to 2024 delivered an annual Clinical Research Informatics Year-in-Review as the closing keynote of the AMIA Informatics Summit, surveying the year's notable scholarship in the field. He has also authored review articles surveying the state of the field. His wider research encompasses electronic health record–based approaches to clinical trial recruitment, real-world evidence generation, and learning health systems, with a focus on the ethical, effective, and equitable deployment of artificial intelligence in health care.

Embí served as president and chair of the board of directors of the American Medical Informatics Association (AMIA) and as president of the American College of Medical Informatics (ACMI). He has served on the Board of Scientific Counselors to the National Library of Medicine, the National Advisory Council to the Agency for Healthcare Research and Quality (AHRQ), and the board of directors of the American College of Rheumatology. In 2024 he was elected a member of the National Academy of Medicine. He is a Fellow of the American College of Physicians, the American College of Medical Informatics, the American Medical Informatics Association, and the International Academy of Health Sciences Informatics.

== Selected publications ==
- Embi, Peter J.; Jain, Anil; Clark, Jeffrey; et al. (2005). "Effect of a clinical trial alert system on physician participation in trial recruitment". Archives of Internal Medicine. 165 (19): 2272–2277. doi:10.1001/archinte.165.19.2272.
- Embi, Peter J.; Payne, Philip R. O. (2009). "Clinical research informatics: challenges, opportunities and definition for an emerging domain". Journal of the American Medical Informatics Association. 16 (3): 316–327. doi:10.1197/jamia.M3005. PMC 2732242.
- Embí, Peter J. (2021). "Algorithmovigilance—Advancing Methods to Analyze and Monitor Artificial Intelligence–Driven Health Care for Effectiveness and Equity". JAMA Network Open. 4 (4): e214622. doi:10.1001/jamanetworkopen.2021.4622. PMID 33856479.
