= Bergeron =

Bergeron is a surname of French origin.

The name Bergeron may be derived from the Old German word berg, meaning hill or mountain. It may also be derived from the old French berger, meaning shepherd.

== People named Bergeron ==
- Joseph Bergeron, American cartoonist
- Bryan Bergeron, American author
- Dan Bergeron, American politician
- David Bergeron (born 1981), American football player
- David Bergeron (historian) (born 1938), American literary historian
- Élisabeth Bergeron (1851–1936), Canadian Venerated religious servant
- Jean-Claude Bergeron (born 1968), Canadian ice hockey goaltender
- Jean-François Bergeron (boxer), Canadian boxer
- John J. M. Bergeron, Canadian research scientist and Rhodes Scholar
- John Bergeron, surrealist artist
- Marc-André Bergeron (born 1980), Canadian ice hockey defenceman
- Marilyn Bergeron (born 1983), Canadian missing person
- Matthew Bergeron (born 2000), Canadian gridiron player
- Michel Bergeron (born 1946), coach of the NHL Quebec Nordiques and New York Rangers during the 1980s
- Patrice Bergeron (born 1985), Canadian ice hockey centre in the National Hockey League
- Paul Bergeron, American politician
- Peter Bergeron, professional baseball player
- René Bergeron (1890–1971), French actor
- Stéphane Bergeron, Canadian politician
- Suzanne Bergeron, Canadian abstract painter
- Tom Bergeron (born 1955), American television personality
- Tor Bergeron, Swedish meteorologist
- Wayne Bergeron, American trumpet player
- William A. Bergeron, American politician

== In fiction ==
- "Harrison Bergeron" is a science fiction short story by Kurt Vonnegut, and the name of the principal character
- Merlí Bergeron and his son Bruno Bergeron are characters in the Catalan television series, Merlí.
