= Christopher G. Chute =

American medical researcher

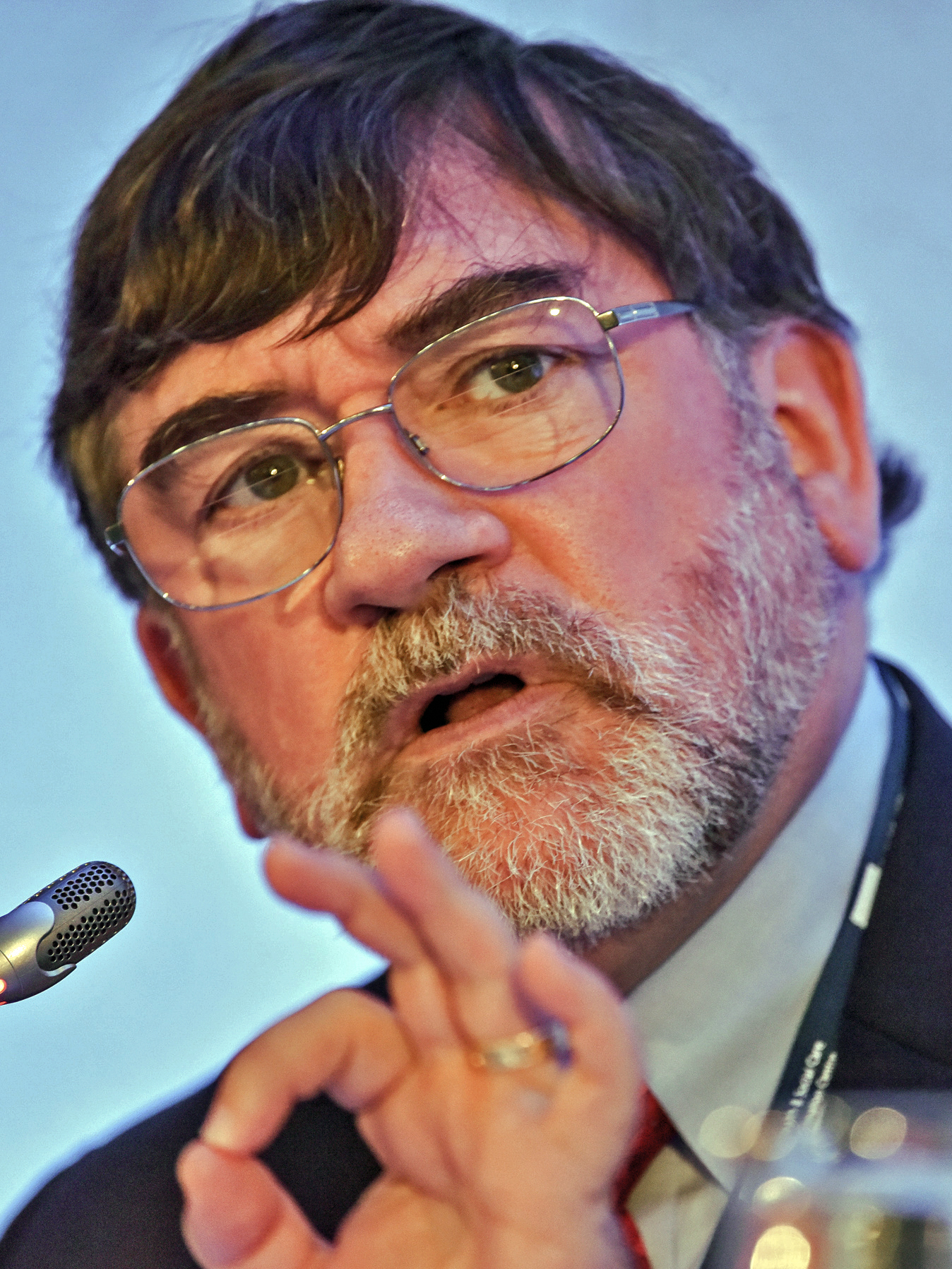
- CG Chute speaking at the WHOFIC meeting in Manchester, UK, October 2015
- Born: July 8, 1955 (age 71); Hartford, Connecticut, United States
- Education: Brown University; Harvard University; Dartmouth College
- Known for: Biomedical Terminologies; Health IT Standards; Apache cTAKES; ICD-11
- Awards: Fellow, ACP; Fellow, ACE; Fellow, ACMI; Elected Member, Association of American Physicians; Elected Member, NAM; Distinguished Fellow, ACMI; William W. Stead Award for Thought Leadership in Informatics, AMIA; Mayo Clinic Distinguished Alumni Award; Morris F. Collen Award of Excellence, AMIA
- Scientific career
- Fields: Medical concept representation Controlled vocabulary Biomedical Informatics; Real world data
- Workplaces: Mayo Clinic; University of Minnesota; Johns Hopkins University
- Thesis: Prospective studies of reproductive history, exogenous estrogens, body mass, height, and smoking on the risk of colorectal cancer in women (1990)

Christopher G. Chute is a Bloomberg Distinguished Professor at Johns Hopkins University, with primary appointments in the Division of General Internal Medicine in the School of Medicine, the School of Nursing, and the Department of Health Policy and Management in the Bloomberg School of Public Health. He is a physician-scientist and biomedical informatician known for standardizing biomedical terminologies and health information technology (IT) standards. Chute's work aims to ensure that clinical data is represented in a comparable and consistent manner in order to improve medical practice. He chaired the World Health Organization Revision Steering Group for the revision of the International Classification of Diseases (ICD-11). He has led many large-scale national repositories of electronic health record data to advance outcomes research, including the National COVID Cohort Collaborative (N3C).

== Education ==
Chute received his undergraduate and medical training at Brown University and Master of Public Health from Harvard University, followed by an internal medicine residency at Dartmouth College, and doctoral training in Epidemiology/Biostatistics at Harvard University. He is board certified in Internal Medicine and Clinical Informatics.

== Career ==
Chute joined the Mayo clinic in 1988 and became the founding chair of the Division of Biomedical Informatics at Mayo Clinic in the Department of Health Sciences Research, now Artificial Intelligence and Informatics. He was also a professor of Medical Informatics and Section Head. Chute served as Chair of the Mayo Clinic Data Governance Committee, and on Mayo's enterprise IT Oversight Committee. During his tenure at Mayo Clinic, Chute was principal investigator (PI) on a large portfolio of research, including the ONC Beacon Community (where he served as Co-PI), the LexGrid projects, and Mayo’s Clinical and Translational Science Award Informatics. Additionally, he led several National Institutes of Health (NIH) grants, including one of the eMERGE centers from the National Human Genome Research Institute (NHGRI), which focused on genome-wide association studies against shared phenotypes derived from electronic medical records. Chute led the multi-site eMERGE Consortium effort to identify clinical phenotypes from genomic variant data in medical records and to extract the phenotypic data for large-scale genomic research. Much of Chute’s early work focused on semantics of disease and health event classification, particularly in electronic health records.

While at Mayo, was a principal investigator of the Strategic Health IT Advanced Research Projects (SHARP) Program. Established in 2010 by the Office of the National Coordinator for Health Information Technology (ONC), part of the U.S. Department of Health and Human Services, the program had four subject areas: Security of Health Information Technology (SHARPS), Patient-centered Cognitive Support (SHARPc), Health Care Application and Network Design (SMART), and Secondary Use of EHR Information (SHARPn). Chute led SHARPn, which created tools and resources to facilitate the effective use of electronic health records data for secondary purposes, such as care process and outcomes improvement, biomedical research, and epidemiologic monitoring of the U.S. population’s health. SHARPn created tools capable of identifying and sorting digital health information from electronic health records regardless of how the data was organized or what format the file was in with the goal of creating a comprehensive pool of real-world clinical data.

In December 2014 Chute retired from the Mayo Clinic, where he remains an emeritus professor, and has been honored with the Mayo Clinic Distinguished Alumnus Award. Chute joined Johns Hopkins University, where he became the Bloomberg Distinguished Professor in Health Informatics. He holds academic appointments in the School of Medicine (Division of General Internal Medicine & Division of Health Sciences Informatics), Bloomberg School of Public Health (Department of Health Policy and Management), and School of Nursing (Division of Health Informatics). Chute also holds various leadership roles within Johns Hopkins. He serves as the Chief Research Information Officer for Johns Hopkins Medicine. He is the Deputy Director of the Institute for Clinical and Translational Research, one of over 60 research institutions funded by the NIH Clinical and Translational Sciences Award (CTSA) program that aims to improve the way biomedical research is conducted across the United States of America. Chute is co-chair of the Research Subcouncil of the Johns Hopkins Data Trust. He also heads the Section of Biomedical Informatics and Data Science (BIDS) within the Division of General internal Medicine.

Chute has held numerous roles in national and international health informatics organizations and committees. He was Chair of the International Organization for Standardization (ISO) Health Informatics Technical Committee (ISO/TC 215). He also served on the Health Information Technology Standards Committee for the Office of the National Coordinator in the United States Department of Health and Human Services, and the Health Level 7 Advisory Council. Chute has also served as Chair of the Biomedical Computing and Health Informatics study section at NIH, Chair of the Board of the HL7/FDA/NCI/CDISC BRIDG project, on the Board of the Clinical Data Interchange Standards Consortium, ANSI Healthcare Information Technology Standards Panel Board member, Chair of the US delegation to ISO TC215 for Health Informatics, Convener of Healthcare Concept Representation WG3 within the TC215, Co-chair of the HL7 Vocabulary Committee, Chair of the International Medical Informatics Association WG6 on Medical Concept Representation, American Medical Informatics Association Board member, and multiple other NIH biomedical informatics study sections as chair or member. He is presently on the Board of the HL7 Vulcan FHIR Accelerator for Translational Informatics.

Chute chaired the World Health Organization (WHO) Revision Steering Group for the revision of the International Classification of Diseases (ICD-11). The Revision Steering Group oversaw the development of the 11th revision of the ICD. The 11th revision was endorsed by the World Health Assembly in 2019 and came into effect in 2022. The revision transformed the ICD into a modern data science resource for disease classification and naming. Changes in design and structure were prepared to reflect the arrival of the networked digital era. Innovations include an online coding tool replacing the traditional index, and an application program interface to enable remote access. Another addition was the new coding feature postcoordination of codes, which enables two or more codes to be linked into a cluster that describes a clinical concept, allowing more detail to be added. Chute currently co-chairs the Medical Scientific Advisory Committee for ICD with an emphasis on scientific consensus of clinical phenotype.

Chute was the Principal Investigator of the National Center for Advancing Translational Sciences (NCATS) Biomedical Data Translator program, also referred to as "Translator." The Biomedical Data Translator program aims to develop a translator system that integrates different types of existing data sets in order to gain insights that can drive translational research and support clinical practice.

Chute co-led the National COVID Cohort Collaborative (N3C), a large-scale initiative aimed at advancing COVID-19 research by centralizing and harmonizing electronic health record data from multiple institutions. Chute also led the Data Liaison Team, which developed tools and protocols for data ingestion and harmonization across diverse clinical sites. He also helped create the N3C Enclave, a platform that facilitates collaborative analytics and data sharing among researchers by harmonizing clinical data provided by participating members, including demographic and clinical characteristics of patients with COVID-19. Studies using N3C data sets led to a number of discoveries, including that COVID-19 mortality decreased over time, that machine learning models could accurately predict ultimate clinical severity based on patient demographic characteristics and comorbidities, and that vaccination was consistently associated with lower odds and rates of long COVID clinical diagnosis.

Chute leads the WHO Collaborating Centre for Classifications, Terminologies and Standards.

Chute is a Fellow of the American College of Physicians, the American College of Epidemiology, Health Level 7 (HL7), and a founding fellow of the American Medical Informatics Association (AMIA), as well as the International Academy of Health Sciences Informatics. Chute served as President of the American College of Medical Informatics (ACMI), a body of elected fellows within the American Medical Informatics Association (AMIA) who have made significant and sustained contributions to the field, from 2017-2018, and was named a Distinguished Fellow in 2022. In 2024, Chute was elected to the National Academy of Medicine in recognition of his work on how clinical data is represented to support data inferencing and discovery science in the learning health system, focusing on ontologies, classifications, and real-world data.

== Awards ==
- 1987 Fellow, American College of Epidemiology
- 1988 Fellow, American College of Physicians
- 1995 Elected Fellow, American College of Medical Informatics (ACMI)
- 2002 President's Award, American Medical Informatics Association
- 2005 IBM Faculty Award
- 2015-2020 President, American College of Medical Informatics
- 2017 Inaugural Elected Fellow, International Academy of Health Sciences Informatics
- 2017 Elected Fellow, Health Level Seven International (HL7)
- 2019 Microsoft Innovation Award: Transform the Care Continuum and Reimagine Health
- 2021 Distinguished Alumni Award, Mayo Clinic
- 2022 Elected Member, Association of American Physicians
- 2022 FedHealthIT Innovation Award (with N3C)
- 2022 Distinguished Fellow, American College of Medical Informatics
- 2023 DataWorks! Challenge Grand Prize - Data Sharing, NIH Office of Data Science Strategy (with N3C)
- 2023 HHS Secretary's Award for Distinguished Service (with N3C)
- 2024 William W. Stead Award for Thought Leadership in Informatics
- 2024 Elected Member, National Academy of Medicine
- 2025 Morris F. Collen Award of Excellence from ACMI

== Publications ==
Chute has more than 54,000 citations in Google Scholar and an h-index of 109 as of July 2026.

- PubMed Citations
- Google Scholar Citations

Highly Cited Articles

- 2010 with GK Savova, JJ Masanz, PV Ogren, J Zheng, S Sohn, KC Kipper-Schuler, Mayo clinical Text Analysis and Knowledge Extraction System (cTAKES): architecture, component evaluation and applications, in: Journal of the American Medical Informatics Association. Vol. 17, nº 5; 507-513.
- 1993 with JE Oesterling, SJ Jacobsen, HA Guess, CJ Girman, LA Panser, MM Lieber, Serum prostate-specific antigen in a community-based population of healthy men: establishment of age-specific reference ranges, in: JAMA. Vol. 270, nº 7; 860-864.
- 2009 with NF Noy, NH Shah, PL Whetzel, B Dai, M Dorf, N Griffith, C Jonquet, DL Rubin, MA Storey, MA Musen, BioPortal: Ontologies and Integrated Data Resources at the Click of a Mouse, in: Nucleic Acids Research. Vol. 27, nº 2; W170-W173.
- 2013 with JC Denny, L Bastarache, MD Ritchie, RJ Carroll, R Zink, JD Mosley, JR Field, JM Pulley, AH Ramirez, E Bowton, MA Basford, DS Carrell, PL Peissig, AN Kho, JA Pacheco, LV Rasmussen, DR Crosslin, PK Crane, J Pathak, SJ Bielinski, SA Pendergrass, H Xu, LA Hindorff, R Li, TA Manolio, RL Chisholm, EB Larosn, GP Jarvik, MH Brilliant, CA McCarty, IJ Kullo, JL Haines, DC Crawford, DR Masys, DM Roden, Systematic comparison of phenome-wide association study of electronic medical record data and genome-wide association study data in: Nature Biotechnology. Vol. 31, nº 12; 1102-1111.
- 1993 with E Giovannucci, EB Rimm, GA Colditz, MJ Stampfer, A Ascherio, WC Willett, A prospective study of dietary fat and risk of prostate cancer, in: JNCI: Journal of the National Cancer Institute. Vol. 85, nº 19; 1571-1579.
