= Chunhua Weng =

American researcher

- Professor Chunhua Weng
- Education: University of Washington
- Known for: Clinical Research Informatics; Clinical Text Knowledge Engineering; Rare Disease AI; Electronic Health Records Phenotyping; Precision Medicine
- Awards: Fellow, ACMI; Fellow, IAHSI
- Scientific career
- Fields: Health Informatics
- Workplaces: Columbia University
- Thesis: Supporting collaborative clinical trial protocol writing through an annotation design (2005)

Chunhua Weng is an American researcher in clinical research informatics and health informatics. She is a professor of biomedical informatics at Columbia University. She is known for her work on developing computational methods to improve clinical trial design and recruitment, and for advancing the use of electronic health records to support deep phenotyping and precision medicine.

== Biography and career ==
Weng earned her doctoral degree in biomedical informatics and joined the faculty at Columbia University.

== Research ==
Weng's research focuses on applying informatics and artificial intelligence to improve clinical trial design, recruitment, and execution. She has contributed to rare disease research through electronic phenotyping and natural language processing of health records, as well as to precision medicine through development of computable eligibility criteria and knowledge representation frameworks.

== Awards and honors ==
Weng was elected a Fellow of the American College of Medical Informatics in 2015. She was elected a Fellow of the International Academy of Health Sciences Informatics in 2020. In 2025, Weng received the Donald A.B. Lindberg Award for Innovation in Informatics from the American Medical Informatics Association

== Selected publications ==
- Weng, Chunhua; Tu, Samson W.; Sim, Ida; Richesson, Rachel (2010). "Formal representation of eligibility criteria: A literature review". Journal of Biomedical Informatics. 43 (3): 451–467. doi:10.1016/j.jbi.2009.12.004. PMC 2878905.
- T, Botsis; G, Hartvigsen; F, Chen; C, Weng. "Secondary Use of EHR: Data Quality Issues and Informatics Opportunities". Summit on translational bioinformatics. 2010. Summit Transl Bioinform. ISSN 2153-6430. PMID 21347133.
- Weng, C.; Wu, X.; Luo, Z.; Boland, M. R.; Theodoratos, D.; Johnson, S. B. (2011-12-01). "EliXR: an approach to eligibility criteria extraction and representation" (PDF). Journal of the American Medical Informatics Association. 18 (Supplement 1): i116–i124. doi:10.1136/amiajnl-2011-000321. ISSN 1067-5027. PMC 3241167. PMID 21807647.
- Weiskopf, N. G.; Weng, C. (2013-01-01). "Methods and dimensions of electronic health record data quality assessment: enabling reuse for clinical research" (PDF). Journal of the American Medical Informatics Association. 20 (1): 144–151. doi:10.1136/amiajnl-2011-000681. ISSN 1067-5027. PMC 3555312. PMID 22733976.
- Yuan, Chi; Ryan, Patrick B; Ta, Casey; Guo, Yixuan; Li, Ziran; Hardin, Jill; Makadia, Rupa; Jin, Peng; Shang, Ning; Kang, Tian; Weng, Chunhua (2019-04-01). "Criteria2Query: a natural language interface to clinical databases for cohort definition" (PDF). Journal of the American Medical Informatics Association. 26 (4): 294–305. doi:10.1093/jamia/ocy178. ISSN 1527-974X. PMC 6402359. PMID 30753493.

== See also ==
- Health informatics
- Clinical research informatics
