= Dean F. Sittig =

US Professor in Biomedical Informatics and Bioengineering

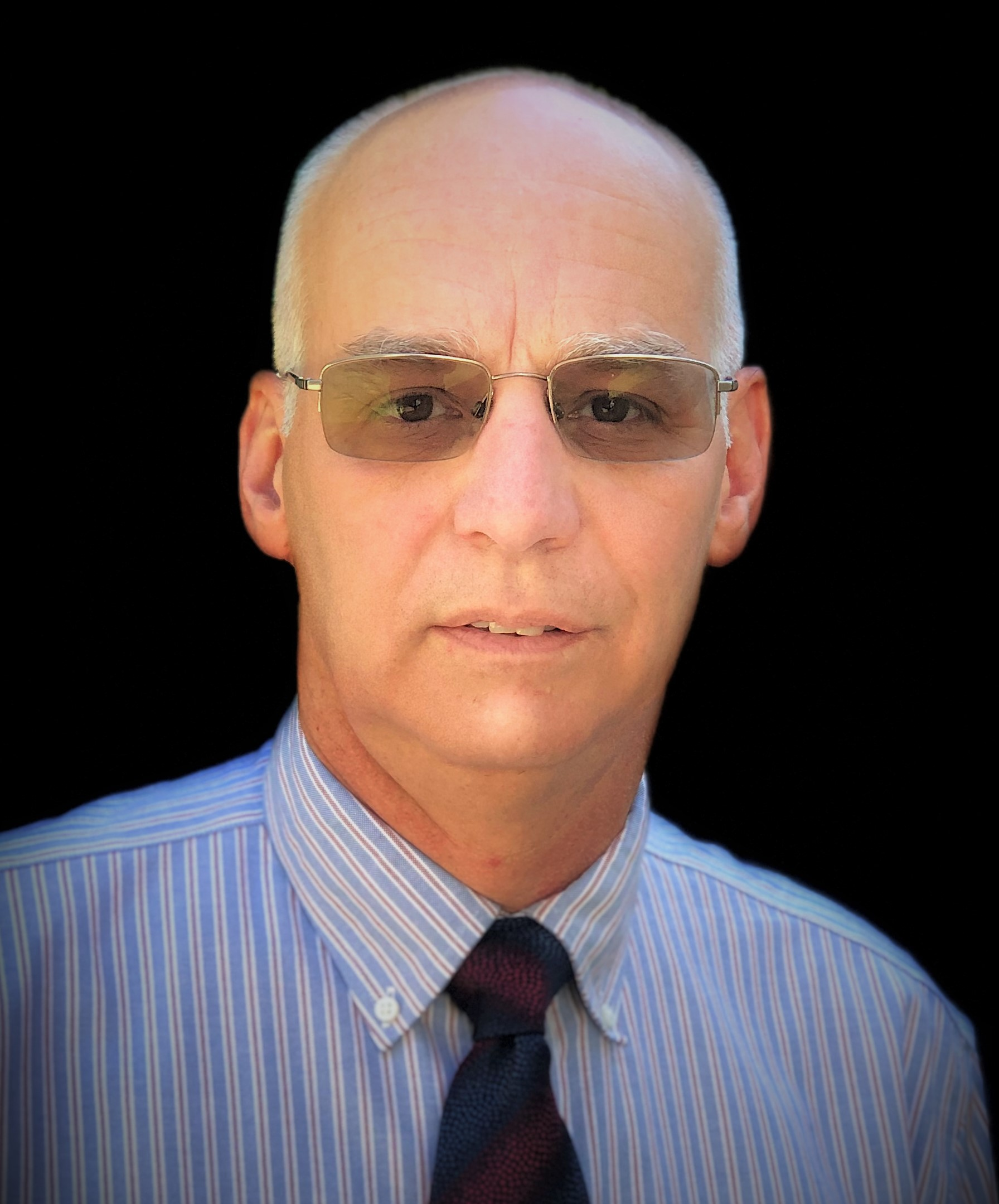
- Born: March 2, 1961; Bellefonte, Pennsylvania, United States
- Education: Pennsylvania State University (B.S., M.S.); University of Utah School of Medicine (Ph.D.)
- Employer: University of Texas Health Science Center at Houston
- Known for: Clinical informatics
- Spouse: JoAnn Kaalaas-Sittig
- Children: 1
- Website: circleinformatics.org

Dean Forrest Sittig (born March 2, 1961) is an American biomedical informatician specializing in clinical informatics. He is a professor emeritus in Biomedical Informatics at the University of Texas Health Science Center at Houston and Executive Director of the Clinical Informatics Research Collaborative (CIRCLE). Sittig was elected as a fellow of the American College of Medical Informatics in 1992, the Healthcare Information and Management Systems Society in 2011, and was a founding member of the International Academy of Health Sciences Informatics in 2017. Since 2004, he has worked with Joan S. Ash, a professor at Oregon Health & Science University to interview several Pioneers in Medical Informatics.

== Education ==
Sittig earned a bachelor's degree in science and a master's degree in biomedical engineering before he trained in medical informatics at the University of Utah School of Medicine and the LDS Hospital under Reed M. Gardner and Homer R. Warner. His dissertation was entitled, “COMPAS: A Computerized Patient Advice System to Direct Ventilatory Care." He won the 1987 Martin Epstein Award at the Annual Symposium on Computer Applications in Medical Care (now the American Medical Informatics Association) for this work.

== Research ==
His research focuses on understanding the sociotechnical risks of, and solutions to address, unintended consequences associated with design, development, implementation, and use of various health information technologies (HIT), including computer-based provider order entry, clinical decision support within electronic health records (EHRs), and most recently in EHR-related patient safety. Along with Hardeep Singh, he developed an “8-dimension socio-technical model for safe and effective HIT implementation and use”. A modification of the model was used by the National Academy of Medicine (NAM), in a sentinel event report from the Joint Commission, and the National Quality Forum to describe the socio-technical challenges associated with measuring HIT safety. This model has also been used in a variety of HIT-related research studies including: identification of keys to implementing novel clinical prediction algorithms, exploring barriers to implementation of clinical information systems in nursing homes, development of a childhood cancer passport for care, and development of a questionnaire regarding EHR-related safety concerns.

Sittig has published over 600 scientific articles and 6 books. (h-index = 94).

== Honors and awards ==
In 1992 he was elected a Fellow of the American College of Medical Informatics (ACMI). In 2017 he was elected an Inaugural Fellow of the International Academy of Health Sciences Informatics (IAHSI). In 2019 he was elected a Fellow of the American Medical Informatics Association (AMIA). In 2023 he won the American Medical Informatics Association (AMIA) Donald Eugene Detmer Award for Health Policy Contributions in Informatics. In 2026 he was honored with an ACMI Distinguished Fellow designation in the area of Research and Scholarship.

== Personal life ==
Sittig is married to Joann Kaalaas-Sittig.

== Books and representative papers ==
- Sittig, DF; Singh, H (2012). "Electronic health records and national patient-safety goals". N Engl J Med. 367 (19): 1854–60. doi:10.1056/NEJMsb1205420. PMC 3690003. PMID 23134389.
- Sittig, DF; Singh, H (2010). "A new sociotechnical model for studying health information technology in complex adaptive healthcare systems". Qual Saf Health Care. 19 Suppl 3 (Suppl 3): i68-74. doi:10.1136/qshc.2010.042085. PMC 3120130. PMID 20959322.
- Sittig, DF; Singh, H (2009). "Eight rights of safe electronic health record use". JAMA. 302 (10): 1111–3. doi:10.1001/jama.2009.1311. PMID 19738098.
- Wright, A; Henkin, S; Feblowitz, J; McCoy, AB; Bates, DW; Sittig, DF (2013). "Early results of the meaningful use program for electronic health records". N Engl J Med. 368 (8): 779–80. doi:10.1056/NEJMc1213481. PMID 23425186.
- Singh, H; Spitzmueller, C; Petersen, NJ; Sawhney, MK; Sittig, DF (2013). "Information overload and missed test results in electronic health record-based settings". JAMA Intern Med. 173 (8): 702–4. doi:10.1001/2013.jamainternmed.61. PMC 3822526. PMID 23460235.
- Sittig, DF; Krall, M; Kaalaas-Sittig, J; Ash, JS (2005). "Emotional aspects of computer-based provider order entry: a qualitative study". J Am Med Inform Assoc. 12 (5): 561–7. doi:10.1197/jamia.M1711. PMC 1205605. PMID 15905478.
- Sittig, DF; Pace, NL; Gardner, RM; Beck, E; Morris, AH (1989). "Implementation of a computerized patient advice system using the HELP clinical information system". Comput Biomed Res. 22 (5): 474–87. doi:10.1016/0010-4809(89)90040-2. PMID 2776450.
- Sittig, DF; Wright, A; Osheroff, JA; Middleton, B; Teich, JM; Ash, JS; Campbell, E; Bates, DW (2008). "Grand challenges in clinical decision support". J Biomed Inform. 41 (2): 387–92. doi:10.1016/j.jbi.2007.09.003. PMC 2660274. PMID 18029232.
- Sittig, DF; Singh, H (2011). "Defining health information technology-related errors: new developments since to err is human". Arch Intern Med. 171 (14): 1281–4. doi:10.1001/archinternmed.2011.327. PMC 3677061. PMID 21788544.
- Sittig, DF (April 2002). "Personal health records on the internet: a snapshot of the pioneers at the end of the 20th Century". Int J Med Inform. 65 (1): 1–6. doi:10.1016/s1386-5056(01)00215-5. PMID 11904243.
