= Carolyn Cannuscio =

American epidemiologist

Carolyn C. Cannuscio
- Education: Brown University; Harvard T.H. Chan School of Public Health
- Scientific career
- Workplaces: Perelman School of Medicine
- Thesis: Is caregiving hazardous to women's health? : associations between informal care provision and mental health in the Nurses' Health Study (1998)

Carolyn Cannuscio is an American epidemiologist who is an associate professor at the Perelman School of Medicine. She serves as Director of Research for the Center for Public Health Initiatives. Cannuscio works to improve public health with a specific focus on disadvantaged urban populations.

== Early life and education ==
Cannuscio was an undergraduate student at Brown University, where she studied health and society. She graduated in 1992 and switched her focus to social epidemiology. She joined the Harvard T.H. Chan School of Public Health for her doctoral studies, where she investigated whether caregiving was hazardous to the health of women. After earning her doctorate, Cannuscio joined Merck Group as an epidemiologist. She was appointed the Robert Wood Johnson Health & Society Scholar at the Perelman School of Medicine in 2006.

== Research and career ==
In 2007, Cannuscio joined the faculty at the University of Pennsylvania. Based at the Perelman School of Medicine, Cannuscio has continued to work on epidemiology and health disparities. She has concentrated her efforts on the health of people in Philadelphia, which is the poorest of the largest cities in United States. In an attempt to improve public health, Cannuscio has worked with the Free Library of Philadelphia and the Mural Arts Program.

Cannuscio has been part of several projects to improve the evidence-base relating to national public health challenges, including the opioid epidemic, food insecurity and food allergies. She was made Director of Research at the Center for Public Health Initiatives in 2016. She also serves as a member of the Penn Institute for Urban Research.

Cannuscio provided expert commentary to the public throughout the COVID-19 pandemic. Cannuscio investigated how people in the United States felt about sharing health data for controlling the spread of COVID-19 (i.e. contact tracing apps). She showed that white conservatives were less likely than liberals or racial minorities to support digital data usage for COVID-19 monitoring. During 2021, Cannuscio studied effective strategies to improve COVID-19 vaccine uptake. By the summer, vaccine supply was exceeding demand, and less than half of Americans had received one dose of the COVID-19 vaccine. She argued that whilst incentives such as cash may provide a short-term bump, alternate strategies would be more likely to increase population uptake of the vaccine. Alternate strategies could include vaccine mandates for employees or for entry to large gatherings, as well as higher health insurance premiums for unvaccinated people. She believed that the pandemic heightened health anxiety and caused people to experience "anticipatory regret," the fear that you may cause harm to others by infecting them with COVID-19.

Cannuscio recommended people wear N95 respirator masks if they had to socialize, but to stay home if possible.

== Selected publications ==
- Daniel H Solomon; Elizabeth W Karlson; Eric B Rimm; Carolyn C Cannuscio; Lisa A Mandl; JoAnn E Manson; Meir J Stampfer; Gary C Curhan (March 1, 2003). "Cardiovascular morbidity and mortality in women diagnosed with rheumatoid arthritis". Circulation. 107 (9): 1303–1307. doi:10.1161/01.cir.0000054612.26458.b2. ISSN 0009-7322. PMID 12628952. Wikidata Q34182804.
- Jennifer K Pai; Tobias Pischon; Jing Ma; et al. (December 1, 2004). "Inflammatory markers and the risk of coronary heart disease in men and women". The New England Journal of Medicine. 351 (25): 2599–2610. doi:10.1056/nejmoa040967. ISSN 0028-4793. PMID 15602020. Wikidata Q34376967.
- Carolyn Cannuscio; Jason Block; Ichiro Kawachi (September 1, 2003). "Social capital and successful aging: the role of senior housing". Annals of Internal Medicine. 139 (5 Pt 2): 395–399. doi:10.7326/0003-4819-139-5_part_2-200309021-00003. ISSN 0003-4819. PMID 12965964. Wikidata Q35215892.
