= Wendy W. Chapman =

American research scientist

- Spouse: Brian Chapman

Academic background
- Education: BA, Linguistics, Ph.D. Medical Informatics, 2000, University of Utah
- Thesis: Using natural language processing to assist automatic decision support systems and quality assurance in radiology (2000)

Academic work
- Institutions: University of Melbourne; University of Utah School of Medicine; University of California, San Diego; University of Pittsburgh

Wendy Webber Chapman is an American research scientist in biomedical Natural language processing and Information Extraction. In 2019, after serving for six years as Chair of the University of Utah School of Medicine Division of Biomedical Informatics, Chapman left the institution to join the University of Melbourne.

== Early life and education ==
Chapman completed her Bachelor of Arts degree in linguistics and her Ph.D. in Medical Informatics from the University of Utah.

== Career ==
Upon completing her doctorate, Chapman joined the University of Pittsburgh as a postdoctoral fellow in Biomedical Informatics before joining their faculty. As an assistant professor, she worked with the RODS Lab on biosurveillance and learned how to develop and evaluate NLP techniques. She eventually left the institution to join the University of California, San Diego in 2010. Prior to leaving, she was elected a Fellow of the American Medical Informatics Association for her "sustained technical and organizational contributions to the field."

During her short tenure at the UC San Diego School of Medicine’s Division of Biomedical Informatics, Chapman participated in active research related to biomedical Natural language processing. In 2013, Chapman returned to her alma mater to chair their Department of Biomedical Informatics. The following year, she was the recipient of a 2014 Hedwig van Ameringen Executive Leadership in Academic Medicine Fellowship. Her work in "developing informatics algorithms and tools for natural language processing, a means of using computational power to pull data from doctor’s notes and health records that are otherwise hidden from automated analyses," was recognized with an election to the National Academy of Medicine.

In 2019, after serving for six years as Chair of the University of Utah School of Medicine's Division of Biomedical Informatics, Chapman left the institution to join the University of Melbourne. During the COVID-19 pandemic, Chapman was appointed to the board of the Australasian Institute of Digital Health. She is also an Associate Editor of the Journal of Biomedical Informatics.

== Personal life ==
Chapman is married to fellow scientist Brian Chapman.
