= Marco Ramoni =

- Born: April 13, 1963; Italy
- Died: June 8, 2010 (aged 47); Boston, US
- Education: McGill University; University of Pavia; University of Geneva
- Known for: Translational Bioinformatics; Bayesian Networks in Ontologies; Bayesian approaches to learning and reasoning; gene expression temporal reasoning; SNP phenotyping
- Awards: University of Geneva, Switzerland, Confederation Fellow
- Scientific career
- Fields: Bioinformatics, medicine
- Workplaces: Harvard Medical School; MIT; Harvard-Partners Center for Genetics and Genomics; Children's Hospital Boston
- Academic advisors: Dr. Vimla L. Patel of McGill University; Dr. Mario Stefanelli of University of Pavia

Marco Ramoni (April 13, 1963 – June 8, 2010) was a recognized a translational biostatistician and bioinformatician at the Children's Hospital Informatics Program, Boston, affiliated with the Harvard-MIT Division of Health Sciences and Technology.

== Biography ==
He trained in philosophy and bioengineering, and received a PhD from a joint program between the Politecnico di Milano and the University of Pavia, Italy. He completed fellowships at the University of Massachusetts (Amherst), McGill University, and the University of Geneva. He was associate professor of pediatrics and medicine at Harvard Medical School, and he was the director of the Harvard Biomedical Cybernetics Laboratory. He co-founded the American Medical Informatics Association Summit on Translational Bioinformatics in 2008.

Ramoni was posthumously elected into the American College of Medical Informatics in 2010.

== Biographical information ==
Ramoni is survived by his wife, Rachel Badovinac Ramoni, who is a faculty member at Harvard Medical School.
