= American Association for Medical Systems and Informatics =

The American Association for Medical Systems and Informatics (AAMSI) was an organization created to encourage improvements in the state of medical care by encouraging the development of computer systems for that field.

== History ==
On August 19, 1981, the American Association for Medical Systems and Informatics was incorporated. This organization came into existence as a result of the efforts of two predecessor organizations, the Society for Computer Medicine (SCM), incorporated in November, 1972, and the Society for Advanced Medical Systems (SAMS), incorporated in November, 1975, to merge into one. Formal dissolution of SCM and SAMS occurred on April 30, 1982.

== Purpose ==
AAMSI's main purpose was to support patient care, teaching, research, and health administration through the development and implementation of computer systems. To meet this goal, the association served as a clearinghouse for information on medical systems and informatics, supported committees which contributed to the advance of medical informatics and sponsored annual conferences on advances in medical information systems.

In 1989, AAMSI merged with the Symposium on Computer Applications in Medical Care (SCAMC) and the American College of Medical Informatics (ACMI) to form the American Medical Informatics Association (AMIA).

A collection of AAMSI's papers were donated to the National Library of Medicine in 1987.

== See also ==
- Society for Medical Decision Making
- American Medical Informatics Association
