= Medical decision-making =

Medical decision-making may refer to:

- Decision-making, a cognitive process for selecting a course of action, in the context of health or medical diagnosis and treatment
- Medical Decision Making (journal), a peer-reviewed academic journal that publishes papers on the study of medical decisions
