= Suzanne Bakken =

American nurse and academic

Suzanne Bakken Henry
- Education: Arizona State University; University of California, San Francisco
- Scientific career
- Workplaces: Stanford University; Columbia University
- Thesis: The effect of level of patient acuity on clinical decision making by critical care nurses with varying levels of knowledge and experience (1989)

Suzanne B. Bakken Henry is an American nurse who is a professor of biomedical informatics at Columbia University. Her research considers health equity and informatics. She is a Fellow of the New York Academy of Medicine, American College of Medical Informatics and American Academy of Nursing.

== Early life and education ==
Bakken was an undergraduate student in nursing at Arizona State University. She earned her doctoral degree in nursing at the University of California, San Francisco. She moved to Stanford University as a National Library of Medicine and American Nurses Foundation postdoctoral fellow.

== Research and career ==
In 2006, Bakken joined the Columbia University Institute of Medicine. Her research combines informatics, evidence-based nursing and health equity. At Columbia, she led the Center for Evidence-based Practice in the Underserved and the pre-/post-doctoral program on Reducing Health Disparities through Informatics (RHeaDI).

Bakken worked on the representation of nursing concepts and terminology in Systematized Nomenclature of Medicine and LOINC. She showed that using formal vocabularies to express patient problems enhanced the generalizability of research, improved the quality of health outcomes and improved the traineeship of informatics and nursing researchers. She has argued that digital infrastructure is a critical component of a health ecosystem, and that new clinical tools could be used for self-management and care. However, to make the digital infrastructure fair and equitable, it is key to improve public trust such that individuals contribute personal data and clinical experiences. Bakken developed community engagement projects to improve public trust amongst urban Latino populations.

Bakken is known for her contributions to biomedical informatics, with a focus on visual analytic innovations, training of informatics students and knowledge formalization. She spent 2015 as a Scholar in Residence at the National Academy of Medicine. During the COVID-19 pandemic, Bakken was supported by the National Institutes of Health to create a visualization toolbox to address COVID-19 misinformation and hesitation around testing and vaccination.

== Awards and honors ==
- 1995 Elected Fellow of the American Academy of Nursing
- 2006 American College of Medical Informatics Virginia K. Saba Award for Nursing Informatics Leadership
- 2007 UCSF School of Nursing Centennial Wall of Fame
- 2008 University of California, San Francisco Helen Nahm Lecture Award
- 2010 Pathfinder Award
- 2018 Sigma International Nurse Researcher Hall of Fame
- 2018 Friend of the National Library of Medicine
- 2019 IMIA François Grémy Award of Excellence
- 2023 American College of Medical Informatics Morris F. Collen Award of Excellence
- 2024 American Academy of Nursing Living Legend Award

== Selected publications ==
- Deborah J Bowen, Matthew Kreuter, Bonnie Spring, et al. (1 May 2009). "How we design feasibility studies". American Journal of Preventive Medicine. 36 (5): 452–457. doi:10.1016/j.amepre.2009.02.002. ISSN 0749-3797. PMC 2859314. PMID 19362699. Wikidata Q33809081.
- Sally W Aboelela, Elaine Larson, Suzanne Bakken, Olveen Carrasquillo, Allan Formicola, Sherry A Glied, Janet Haas, Kristine M Gebbie (February 2007). "Defining interdisciplinary research: conclusions from a critical review of the literature". Health Services Research. 42 (1 Pt 1): 329–46. doi:10.1111/j.1475-6773.2006.00621.x. ISSN 0017-9124. PMC 1955232. PMID 17355595. Wikidata Q28396549.
- Rebecca Schnall, Marlene Rojas, Suzanne Bakken, et al. (19 February 2016). "A user-centered model for designing consumer mobile health (mHealth) applications (apps)". Journal of Biomedical Informatics. 60: 243–251. doi:10.1016/j.jbi.2016.02.002. ISSN 1532-0464. PMC 4837063. PMID 26903153. Wikidata Q36813913.
