= RIMM =

RIMM may refer to:

- Rambus In-line Memory Module, a packaging for RDRAM
- RIMM, former NASDAQ symbol for Research In Motion, a Canadian wireless device company, maker of the BlackBerry.
- Eric Rimm, American nutrition scientist
- Martin Rimm
- Sylvia Rimm (born 1935), American psychiatrist and writer
- RIMM RGB, a standard input-referred color image encoding
