= Medical Decision Making (journal) =

- Discipline: Decision-making, medical informatics
- Language: English
- Edited by: Brian Zikmund-Fisher

Publication details
- History: 1981–present
- Publisher: SAGE Publications on behalf of the Society for Medical Decision Making
- Frequency: 8/year
- Impact factor: 2.583 (2020)

Standard abbreviations
- ISO 4: Med. Decis. Mak.
- NLM: Med Decis Making

Indexing
- CODEN: MDMADE
- ISSN: 0272-989X (print); 1552-681X (web)
- OCLC no.: 300296676

Links
- Journal homepage; Online access; Online archive

Medical Decision Making is a peer-reviewed academic journal that publishes papers in the fields of decision-making and medical informatics. Its editor-in-chief is Brian Zikmund-Fisher (University of Michigan). It was established in 1981 and is currently published by SAGE Publications on behalf of the Society for Medical Decision Making. A sister open access journal focusing on applications of medical decision making, Medical Decision Making Policy & Practice, began publishing in 2016.

== Abstracting and indexing ==
The journal is abstracted and indexed in MEDLINE, Scopus, Science Citation Index Expanded, and the Social Sciences Citation Index. According to the Journal Citation Reports, its 2020 impact factor is 2.583, ranking it 21st out of 30 journals in the category "Medical Informatics", 59th out of 108 journals in the category "Health Care Sciences & Services", and 42nd out of 88 journals in the category "Health Policy & Services"

== Editors ==
The following persons have been editors-in-chief of the journal:

- Lee B. Lusted, 1981–1985
- Dennis G. Fryback, 1986–1988
- J. Robert Beck, 1989–1994
- Arthur S. Elstein, 1995–1999
- Frank A. Sonnenberg, 2000–2004
- Mark Helfand, 2005–2012
- Alan J. Schwartz, 2013-2020
- Brian J. Zikmund-Fisher, 2021-2025
