= Ramoní =

Ramoní or Ramoni is the name of:

- Ramoní (footballer, born 1929), full name Ramón Martínez Pérez, Spanish footballer
- Ramoní (footballer, born 1946), full name Ramón Díaz Cruz, Spanish footballer
- Ramoni Olalekan Mustapha, Nigerian politician
- Marco Ramoni, Italian academic
- Ignacio Romaní Cantera, Spanish politician
