= Vimla L. Patel =

Canadian/American cognitive psychologist and biomedical informaticist

- Born: Fiji
- Education: University of Otago; McGill University
- Known for: Cognitive science methods applied to medical reasoning Health Informatics; Decision making and medical errors Human factors and health information technology AI and cognition in healthcare
- Awards: Fellow, Royal Society of Canada; Fellow, ACMI; Fellow, New York Academy of Medicine; William W. Stead Award for Thought Leadership in Informatics (AMIA, 2021); D.Sc. (hon), University of Victoria
- Scientific career
- Fields: Health Informatics; Cognitive Psychology
- Workplaces: McGill University; Columbia University; UTHealth; ASU; New York Academy of Medicine
- Notable students: Marco Ramoni; Trevor Cohen; Thomas Kannampallil; David Kaufman

Vimla Lodhia Patel FRSC is a Fijian-born Canadian/American cognitive psychologist and biomedical informaticist.

She is renowned for her pioneering work in health informatics, cognitive psychology, and medical decision-making. Her research has significantly advanced understanding of how technology mediates clinical performance, medical errors, and decision-making in high-stakes environments.

Patel has worked in the area of biomedical informatics, in particular studying the mediating roles of technology on performance. Her work includes studies of medical reasoning and decision making, errors and error reduction in emergency care and other critical medical environments (including telephone triage). Her past work in health cognition includes medical reasoning, studies of risk-taking behavior and sexual decision making related to HIV in youth and adolescents. Her current work focuses mostly on cognition and learning, and the role of AI in augmenting human cognition in healthcare.

== Biography and career ==
Patel was born in Fiji and was educated at Southland Girls High School and the University of Otago in New Zealand. After moving to Australia and then Canada, she obtained an MA and a PhD at McGill University in Montreal, before working as a tenured professor in the Department of Medicine and Director of the Center for Medical Education. Her early research focused on scientific foundations for medical and health education using theories and methods from cognitive science.

She was a founding member of HEALnet (Health Evidence Application and Linkage Network), which made seminal contributions furthering informatics research and application in Canada. She was also a member of the InterMed Collaboratory, based at Stanford University, which developed guidelines for medical decision support, and has done extensive work in India, Africa, Fiji and Colombia in cross-cultural cognition research.

In 2000 she became a tenured professor and director of the Laboratory of Cognition and Decision Making in the Department of Biomedical Informatics at Columbia University, where she was also a professor at the New York Psychiatric Institute and Teacher’s College. From 2007 to 2009, she served as Professor and interim chair, and subsequently vice chair of the Department of BMI at Arizona State University. Patel was a professor of biomedical informatics and co-director of the Center for Cognitive Informatics and Decision Making at the University of Texas Health Science Center at Houston from 2009 to 2011.

As of November 2011, Patel joined the New York Academy of Medicine as a senior research scientist and the director of the Center for Cognitive Studies in Medicine and Public Health, and is an adjunct professor of biomedical informatics at Columbia University in New York. She is also a special editor of the Springer book series on Cognitive Informatics in Healthcare and Biomedicine.

== Research ==
In 1986, Patel and Groen’s seminal study on how medical experts reason demonstrated that experts who accurately diagnosed complex clinical problems used forward reasoning (data to hypothesis), in contrast to novice subjects who used backward reasoning and misdiagnosed or partially diagnosed the same problems. This finding contrasted with the prevailing model of hypothetico-deductive reasoning proposed earlier by Elstein, Shulman and Sprafka (1978).

Patel also applied text comprehension methods to understanding the use of clinical practice guidelines with the goal of increasing adoption of best practices. Patel and colleagues have argued for a new paradigm for error studies, where instead of zero-error tolerance, detection and correction of potential error is viewed as an integral part of cognitive work in a complex workplace.

She is the author of more than 350 scholarly publications in cognitive psychology, biomedical informatics, AI, medical education and related fields, and has edited or co-edited nine books. She is also the special editor of the Springer book series on Cognitive Informatics in Healthcare and Biomedicine.

== Honors ==
- AMIA William W. Stead Award for Thought Leadership in Informatics, 2021
- Elected Fellow, New York Academy of Medicine. 2004
- D.Sc. (honorary), University of Victoria, BC, Canada. 1998
- Elected Fellow, American College of Medical Informatics. 1996
- Fellow, Royal Society of Canada (Academy of Humanities and Social Sciences). 1996
- Elected “Woman of Science” (Sweden). 1994

== Notable trainees ==
- Marco Ramoni
- Trevor Cohen
- Thomas Kannampallil
- David Kaufman

== Publications ==
- Journal Articles
- Book Chapters
- Medline Publications
- Google Scholar Citations
