= Society for Medical Decision Making =

New Jersey-based medical organization

- Abbreviation: SMDM
- Formation: 1979
- Type: Professional Association
- Purpose: "To improve health outcomes through the advancement of proactive systematic approaches to clinical decision-making and policy formation in health care by providing a scholarly forum that connects and educates researchers, providers, policy makers, and the public."
- Location: Bridgewater, New Jersey
- Fields: Health economics, Outcomes research, Decision-making, Health policy
- President: Beate Sander, PhD
- President-Elect: Alan Schwartz, PhD
- Website: smdm.org

The Society for Medical Decision Making (SMDM) is an organization of researchers, clinicians, educators, managers and policy makers based in Bridgewater, New Jersey. It researches and uses rigorous and transparent methodologies in health and clinical care of individuals to assist in health policy formation. Founded in 1979, it holds annual meetings in North America, biennial meetings in Europe and publishes two journals, 'Medical Decision Making', and 'MDM Policy & Practice.'

== Presidents of the society ==
A list of former and current presidents of the SMDM.

- 1980 Eugene L. Saenger
- 1981 Harvey V. Fineberg
- 1982 Arthur S. Elstein
- 1983 Dennis G. Fryback
- 1984 Harold C. Sox Jr.
- 1985 Milton C. Weinstein
- 1986 Sankey V. Williams
- 1987 Donald M. Berwick
- 1988 Stephen G. Pauker
- 1989 J. Sanford Schwartz
- 1990 Edward H. Shortliffe
- 1991 Margaret M. Holmes-Rovner
- 1992 Mark J. Young
- 1993 Robert M. Centor
- 1994 Hilary Llewellyn-Thomas
- 1995 Randall D. Cebul
- 1996 J. Robert Beck
- 1997 Michael J. Barry
- 1998 Robert F. Nease Jr.
- 1999 Douglas K. Owens
- 2000 Mark Eckman
- 2001 Myriam Hunink
- 2002 Joel Tsevat
- 2003 John Wong
- 2004 Scott B. Cantor
- 2005 Karen Kuntz
- 2006 Frank Sonnenberg
- 2007 David Meltzer
- 2008 Gillian Sanders
- 2009 Mark Roberts
- 2010 Kathryn McDonald
- 2011 Marilyn Schapira
- 2012 Anne Stiggelbout
- 2013 Scott Braithwaite
- 2014 Murray Krahn
- 2015 Ahmed Bayoumi
- 2016 Mark Helfand
- 2017 Angie Fagerlin
- 2018 Uwe Siebert
- 2019 Heather Taffet Gold
- 2020 Lisa Prosser
- 2021 Natasha Stout
- 2022 Olga Kostopoulou
- 2023 Beate Sander
- 2024 Alan Schwartz
- 2025 Victoria Shaffer
- 2026 Beate Jahn
