= Cui Tao =

Chinese-American health informatics researcher

Cui Tao is a Chinese and American health informatics researcher who works at the Mayo Clinic in Jacksonville, Florida. At the Mayo Clinic, she holds the Nancy Peretsman and Robert Scully Chair of AI and Informatics as a professor of biomedical informatics, chair of the Department of Artificial Intelligence and Informatics, and vice president for Mayo Clinic Platform Informatics. Her research concerns ontology, the use of AI-assisted reasoning in health decision-making, conversational agents, and the dissemination of information about vaccine safety.

== Education and career ==
Tao received a bachelor's degree in biology, with a minor in computer science, from Beijing Normal University. She went to Brigham Young University for graduate study in computer science. She received a master's degree in 2003, she completed her Ph.D. there. Her 2009 doctoral dissertation, Ontology Generation, Information Harvesting and Semantic Annotation for Machine-Generated Web Pages, was supervised by David W. Embley.

Tao worked for the Mayo Clinic in Rochester, Minnesota from 2009 to 2013, and for the University of Texas Health Science Center at Houston from 2013 to 2024. She took her present position at the Mayo Clinic in Florida in 2024.

== Recognition ==
Tao received the Presidential Early Career Award for Scientists and Engineers in 2017. She was elected to the American College of Medical Informatics in 2018.
