= Christine Laine =

American physician

Christine Laine is an American physician, clinical associate professor in the department of internal medicine at Jefferson Medical College, and the editor-in-chief of the Annals of Internal Medicine.

== Early life and education ==
Laine grew up in Queens, New York City, the oldest of three daughters. As a child, she was interested in art, and her father, an engineer, encouraged her to pursue an art career, unlike her mother, who advised her to take writing classes instead. She graduated summa cum laude from Hamilton College in 1983, where she double majored in writing and biology. She then received her medical degree from the State University of New York at Stony Brook, and went on to complete her fellowship in general internal medicine and clinical epidemiology at Beth Israel Deaconess Medical Center. She later received a masters' in public health degree from Harvard University.

== Editorial career ==
Laine first joined the Annals in June 1995 as a part-time associate editor, and became a deputy editor there in 1998 and senior deputy editor in April 2008. She was appointed the journal's editor-in-chief in April 2009, becoming the youngest person to hold this position in the history of the journal.

She was elected a Member of the National Academy of Medicine in 2024 for advancing the Annals of Internal Medicine and the American College of Physicians by confronting key issues like gun violence, research integrity, misinformation, reproductive rights, health equity, and scientific ethics.

== Personal life ==
Laine met her husband, David Weinberg, when she was an intern (and he was a medical student) at Cornell Medical College. Laine and Weinberg have two children together.
