= Social Sciences Citation Index =

Citation index product of Clarivate Analytics

Science Citation Index
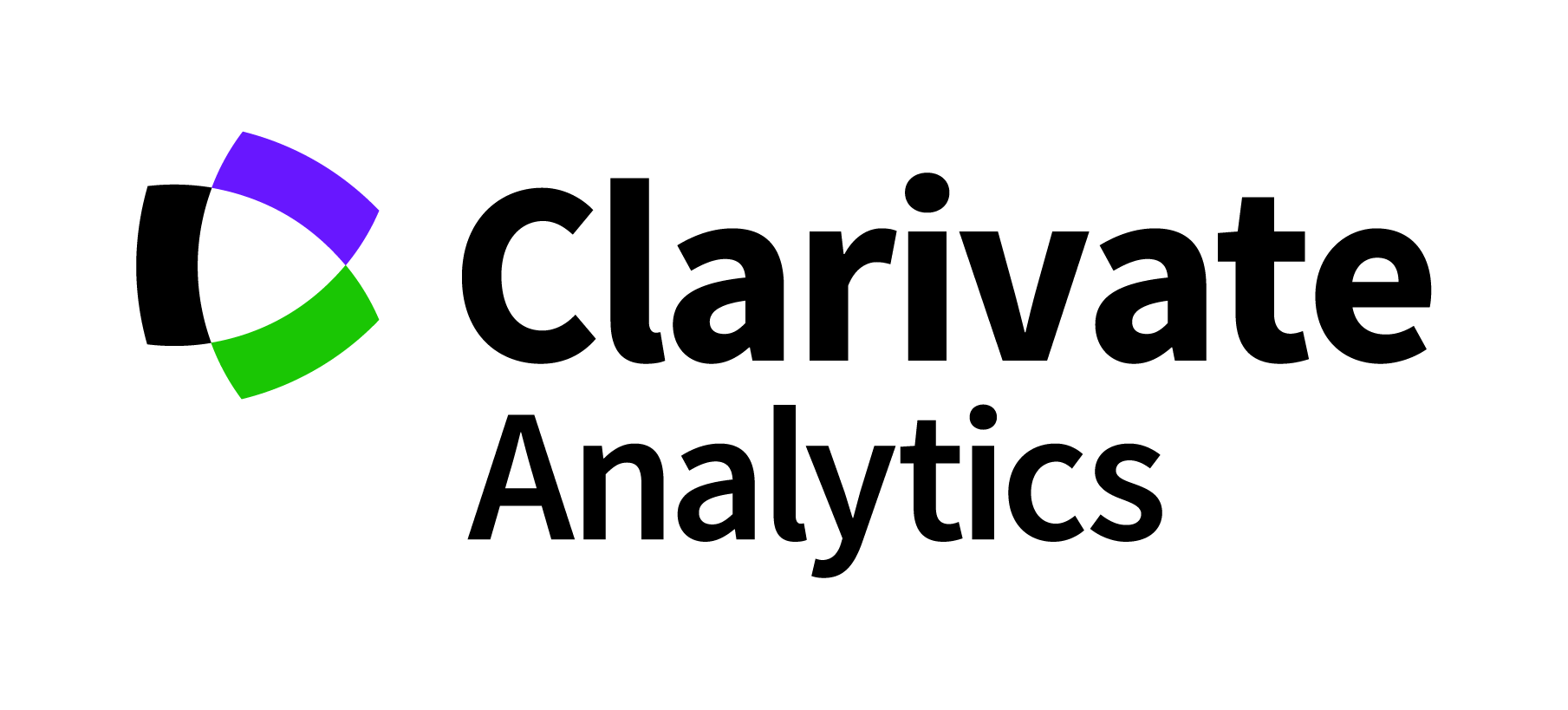
- Clarivate logo
- Producer: Clarivate Analytics ( Canada; Hong Kong)
- History: 1972; 54 years ago

Coverage
- Disciplines: Social sciences
- Record depth: Index & citation indexing

Links
- Website: clarivate.com/ssci
- Title list(s): mjl.clarivate.com/home?PC=SS

The Social Sciences Citation Index (SSCI) is a commercial citation index product of Clarivate Analytics. It was originally developed by the Institute for Scientific Information from the Science Citation Index. The Social Sciences Citation Index is a multidisciplinary index which indexes over 3,400 journals across 58 social science disciplines – 1985 to present, and it has 122 million cited references – 1900 to present.

It also includes a range of 3,500 selected items from some of the world's finest scientific and technical journals. It has a range of useful search functions such as 'cited reference searching', searching by author, subject, or title.

Whilst the Social Sciences Citation Index provides extensive support in bibliographic analytics and research, a number of academic scholars have expressed criticisms relating to ideological bias and its English-dominant publishing nature.

== Overview ==
The SSCI citation database covers some 3,400 academic journals in the social sciences across more than 50 disciplines. It is made available online through the Web of Science service for a fee. The database records which articles are cited by other articles and aids in many bibliographic analytics. The Master Journal List provides users with the ability to search for journals that have been indexed through a simple user interface that allows users to search by author, title or citation. The Social Science Citation Index was conceptualized in 1961 when the founder of the Institute for Scientific Information, Eugene Garfield, received funding from the United States National Institutes of Health. He received this funding in order to produce a comprehensive index of Genetics literature, also known as Genetics Citation Index, although this later became known as the Science Citation Index. The SSCI was then established in 1972 by the Institute for Scientific Information and subsequently owned by Clarivate in 2017.

== Criticism ==
Philip Altbach has criticized the Social Sciences Citation Index of favoring English-language journals generally and American journals specifically, while greatly under-representing journals in non-English languages. Academics such as June Yichun Liu have expressed similar criticisms stating only two percent of the SSCI academic publications come from developing nations thereby creating an artificial importance in countries such as Taiwan. This artificial importance in Taiwan deems all scholarly work published in the SSCI as canonical and most other work immaterial thus affecting scholarships and funding of other scholarly research. Liu suggests this will have some influence in research undertaken by scholars vastly affecting the types of subjects of research, ultimately limiting the scope of academic work. Similar to criticisms leveled by Liu and Altbach, Yusuf Ziya Olpak and Muhammet Arican found that only 2.138% of the total SSCI indexed articles published expressed a variable related to Turkey such as research area or authors address. They also found only three articles as highly cited (0.707%) suggesting a poor representation of Turkish academic literature and Turkish-addressed articles. In contrast to minute representation, they found that the United States was listed as the address in over half the indexed articles within the SSCI, however they note the number of academics publishing Social Science research is perhaps the determining variable. This suggests the English-dominant nature of the SSCI affects the number of Non-English articles and also their impact factor. Comparing Turkish articles average citations with other non-English countries, Olpak and Arican found Turkey's average count was 6.653, Taiwan's was 17.35, Germany was 17.29 and Spain was 12.77. Olpak and Arican suggest this is due to some of the 272 journal articles listed being removed.

Another set of criticisms launched at the SSCI was authored by John B. Davis. He concluded that "one should only apply the impact-adjusted rankings using SSCI data with considerable caution when evaluating scholarly productivity of individuals and departments." He also noted research approaching the boundaries of economics is less likely to be published in prominent journals thereby inappropriately evaluating scholarly productivity relative to the orientation of the discipline. It is also worth noting upon analysing the Journal Citation reports analytics relating to the Social Science Citation Index and Science Citation Index, Loet Leydesdorff expressed difficulty in analysis correlations between disciplines in social sciences in comparison with natural sciences for numerous reasons including methodology. Loet expresses the following regarding methodology, "Unlike the natural and life sciences, the social sciences often construct their subject matter both in terms of 'what' they study and in terms of 'how' the subject under study is to be analyzed." Leydesdorff also noted the developments in specialty clusters are small, recognition on an international scale is limited but also volatile.

Whilst there are some criticisms drawn from the aforementioned academics, there are opposing views on different aspects of the SSCI. Drawing a stark contrast to the social science subset, the field of information science has been stabilized under the subset labelled 'library and information science' over the course of the past two decades. He notes "The relevant set of journals is visible in 2001 both as a factor with 35 journals and as a bi-component of 28 journals. The two composing substructures of library and information science have remained visible in this representation." He also notes in a separate study of the Journal Citation Reports SCI and SSCI merger, that if a journal is potentially marginal in one context, the addition of the other "can provide interesting perspectives on its position in the field and its function in the network." Implemented within the library and information science is institutional repositories; however, this is the only subset in which they are listed which has practical implications for academics as noted by Yi-Ping Liao and Tsu-Jui Ma. It is not, however, without its solutions, if implemented in other subsets of the SSCI, Liao and Ma suggest this will help further academic research in future.

== Ideological bias ==
The potential for ideological bias within the Social Science Citation Index is classed as a potential hazardous outcome by several scholars such as Eric Chiang and Daniel Klein. Aspects of the Social Science Citation Index have been rigorously studied for Ideological bias, with evidence being found, however not conclusive. During the year 2003, using a criterion of consistency and outspokenness, Chiang and Klein analysed under a quarter of the available 1,768 articles published for ideological bias. They clarified their criterion of consistency and outspokenness for republican articles as "an organization is orientated toward a particular ideology if, relative to the norm, it dwells on, expresses, or espouses the sensibilities of that ideology". They do, however, discuss the importance of the benchmark of the 'norm' as they note "it is well established that social democratic sensibilities dominate the social sciences and humanities." They concluded the Social Science Citation Index has quite a clear ideological bias towards 'Social Democratic' articles, however the opposite could be argued due to the lopsided number of social democratic journals.

== Patterns and citations ==
Citation count in academic work is commonly associated with quality of research whilst some researchers suggest it merely reflects influence and visibility within a citation index. Using a variety of quantitative techniques Dragan Ivanović and Yuh-Shan Ho to elaborate on an understanding on the direction of the Information Science and Library Science fields within the SSCI. They documented a number of trends and patterns such as:

- The increase in highly cited articles is consistent with the growth in papers within the fields of Information Science and Library Science over the course of the last century.
- The Information Science and Library Science has a pattern of increasingly citing research in computer science, medicine, psychology, the social sciences, and general sciences 1972–1994.
- The most productive author in the IS&LS categories is David W. Bates, whilst the highest publication performance of first and corresponding author articles position belongs to Joan S. Ash.
- Harvard University is ranked first in the total number of highly cited articles, whilst the University of Maryland has the highest publication performance of first and corresponding author articles.
- Researchers from the United States of America dominate the citation count, culminating a total of over two thirds.

== See also ==
- Arts and Humanities Citation Index
- Emerging Sources Citation Index
- Google Scholar
- List of academic databases and search engines
- Journal Citation Reports
- Science Citation Index
