= John J. M. Bergeron =

Canadian cell biologist

- Born: December 22, 1946 (age 79); Belleville, Ontario, Canada
- Education: McGill University; Oxford University
- Known for: Calnexin; Golgi apparatus Endosomal Signalling; Proteomics
- Awards: Knight of National Order of Quebec (2018); McGill University Medal for Exceptional Academic Achievement (2016); Queen Elizabeth II Diamond Jubilee Medal (2012); McLaughlin Medal, Royal Society of Canada (2004); Rhodes Scholar, Oxford University (1966-69); Order of Canada (Member, 2022).
- Scientific career
- Fields: Biochemistry, Cell Biology
- Workplaces: McGill University

John J. M. Bergeron, CM CQ FRSC (born December 22, 1946) is a Canadian cell biologist and biochemist. He is an Emeritus Robert Reford Professor of Anatomy and Professor of Medicine at McGill University in Montreal, Quebec, Canada. He is a Rhodes Scholar (Class of 1966). He is best known for the discovery of calnexin, endosomal signalling and organellar proteomics.

== Education ==
Bergeron was born in Belleville, Ontario and grew up in and around the Montreal area, QC. He received the Montreal Science Fair award at Université de Montréal in 1961 which allowed him to pursue his studies and receive a B.Sc. in honours biochemistry McGill University in 1966. He continued his graduate work as a Rhodes Scholar at Oxford University, graduating with a D.Phil in biochemistry in 1969. From 1969 to 1971, he continued his post-doctoral training at the Rockefeller University (Supervisor: Dr. G. Palade). He then became an MRC Scientist the National Institute for Medical Research at Mill Hill, London, UK. In 1974, he opened his research lab in the Department of Anatomy and Cell Biology, McGill University. He rose through the ranks becoming full Professor in 1982 and Departmental Chair in 1996. In 2010, he was made Professor of Medicine and transferred his lab over to the MUHC-Research Institute and stayed there until his retirement in 2015.

== Research and scientific career ==
Dr. Bergeron's major contributions are in Discovery Research. He discovered with Dr. Barry I. Posner the paradigm of endosomal signalling. This paradigm defines exactly where and how hormones such as insulin and growth factors known to cause cancer act during health and disease.

Dr. Bergeron also discovered calnexin with Dr. David Y. Thomas and uncovered the calnexin code along with Dr. Ari Helenius and Dr. Armando Parodi. This is the first elucidation of the mechanism of protein folding through a sugar-based code. Bergeron, Thomas, Helenius and Parodi demonstrated that when these proteins are synthesized in cells, the sugars that become attached to the proteins define a code to enable calnexin to guide protein folding. Correct folding is essential to form a functional protein and if newly synthesized proteins are misfolded then disease results. Calnexin through additional proteins that together makeup the calnexin cycle will not only guide folding but will also sense if folding is incorrect. When this happens, calnexin will send the incorrectly folded protein to be degraded through other sugar recognizing proteins that were again discovered with Thomas and separately by Helenius and Parodi. This represents the first protein folding code to be mechanistically solved and represents the basis for several protein misfolding diseases.

Using the new technology of proteomics that Dr. Bergeron pioneered in Quebec and Canada, he elucidated the major resident proteins of the secretory pathway common to all cells. This led to the discovery of several proteins characterized for the first time involved in organ biogenesis and disease.

With Dr. Michel Desjardins, Dr. Bergeron also discovered through proteomics and cell biology the importance of the transfer of endoplasmic reticulum constituents to phagosomes in antigen cross presentation in phagocytes and dendritic cells.

Bergeron is also Founder of Caprion Proteomics Inc. and occupied positions of chief scientific officer, scientific advisor and chair of its scientific advisory board from 2000 to 2007. Bergeron is also past-president of the Human Proteome Organization (2004-2006) and is past-chair of its HUPO Initiatives project (2007-2008).

== Publications and scholarly activities ==
Bergeron has published over 240 scientific manuscripts and was continuously funded through grants from CIHR, CFI, NIH, GQ, FRQS, NCI, PENCE and MRC throughout his career. Bergeron supervised 32 graduate students, 25 post-docs and 5 visiting scientists. He has given lectures regarding his work both nationally and internationally, is a member of several societies (7), and has participated in multiple grant committees (45) and editorial boards (8) throughout his career.

Bergeron is also known as a strong advocate for Health Research in Canada through several OPEDs and interviews in several newspapers including Maclean's magazine, the National Post, the Globe and Mail, the Toronto Star, the Ottawa Citizen, the Edmonton Journal, the Montreal Gazette and The Conversation. He has given interviews regarding Canadian Science policy in the media on RDI Économie, ICI Radio-Canada and iPolitics Live. He provided an explanation of the inner workings of the cell on the Radio-Canada TV program Découverte.

== Awards and recognition ==
- Rhodes Scholar, Oxford University (1966–69).
- MRC Scholar, MRC of Canada (1974–79).
- Chercheur Boursier du Quebec, FRSQ (1979–85).
- Murray J. Barr Award, Canadian Association of Anatomists (1980).
- Fellow of the Royal Society of Canada (1995).
- McLaughlin Medal of the Royal Society of Canada (2004).
- Canadian National Proteomics Network Prix D’Excellence Award for Outstanding Contribution and Leadership to the Canadian Proteomics Community (2010).
- HUPO Discovery Award in Proteomics Sciences (2010).
- The Queen Elizabeth II Diamond Jubilee Medal (2012).
- Research Canada Leadership Award (2015).
- McGill University Medal for Exceptional Academic Achievement (2016).
- Chevalier de L’Ordre National du Québec (2018).
- Order of Canada (Member, 2022).
