= David E. Beck =

American colorectal surgeon and academic

- Born: Geneva, Illinois, US
- Occupation: Colorectal surgeon
- Employer: Vanderbilt University Medical Center

David E. Beck is an American colorectal surgeon and academic. He is a professor of Clinical Surgery at Vanderbilt University Medical Center and a former president of the American Society of Colon and Rectal Surgeons (ASCRS).

== Career ==
Beck previously served in the United States Air Force, where he became Chief of Colon and Rectal Surgery and Chairman of the Department of General Surgery at Wilford Hall USAF Medical Center. He later chaired the Department of Colon and Rectal Surgery at the Ochsner Clinic in New Orleans. At Vanderbilt University Medical Center, he specializes in inflammatory bowel disease, colorectal cancer, and minimally invasive colorectal surgery.

== Selected publications ==
Beck has authored or edited textbooks including the Handbook of Colon and Rectal Surgery and has published more than 150 peer-reviewed articles.
