= Harold C. Sox =

American physician

Harold Sox in October 2026

Harold 'Hal' Sox is an Editor Emeritus of the Annals of Internal Medicine and member of the National Academy of Medicine. Sox was an associate editor of Scientific American Medicine, a consulting associate editor of The American Journal of Medicine and a member of the editorial boards of three medical journals, including The New England Journal of Medicine. From 2013 to 2023, he held several roles at the Patient-Centered Outcomes Research Institute (PCORI), including Senior Advisor and Director of Peer Review.

Sox is the main author of the textbook Medical Decision Making (with M. A. Blatt, M. C. Higgins, and K. I. Marton, Butterworths, 1988; 2nd ed., with M. C. Higgins and D. K. Owens, Wiley, 2013).

Sox has been member of different national committees that have influenced clinical, educational, and public policy in the United States. He served as a chair of the U.S. Preventive Services Task Force, the Institute of Medicine Committee to Study HIV Transmission Through Blood Products, and the Institute of Medicine Committee on Health Effects of Exposures in the Persian Gulf War. He was president of the American College of Physicians.
