= Joan S. Ash =

American professor

Joan S. Ash is a professor and vice chair of the Department of Medical Informatics and Clinical Epidemiology at the Oregon Health & Science University (OHSU) School of Medicine in Portland, OR. Her research focuses on the implementation of clinical informatics systems.

== Early career and education ==
According to a 2001 interview, Ash became interested in library science as a young volunteer at a public library in Massachusetts. After receiving a bachelor's degree at Emmanuel College, she obtained a master's degree in library science from Columbia University. She also holds master's degrees in health science from California State University, Northridge and business administration from Portland State University. She has a doctorate in Systems Science: Business Administration from Portland State.

== Career ==
Ash has been a member of the OHSU Department of Medical Informatics and Clinical Epidemiology faculty since 1996. She previously worked at University of Connecticut and Yale University.

Ash is currently the chair of the Board of Scientific Counselors for the Lister Hill National Center for Biomedical Communications. She has served on the boards of directors of the American Medical Informatics Association, the Medical Library Association, and on the United States National Library of Medicine's Biomedical Library and Informatics Review Committee. She is co-author of Clinical Information Systems: Overcoming Adverse Consequences. In 2002, she was elected as a Distinguished Fellow of the American College of Medical Informatics.
