= Disappearance of Marilyn Bergeron =

Coordinates: 46.7289°N 71.2735°W

Marilyn Bergeron
- Picture of Bergeron distributed to identify her, showing part of her tattoo
- Born: December 21, 1983; Chicoutimi, Quebec, Canada
- Disappeared: February 17, 2008 (aged 24); Saint-Romuald, Quebec, Canada
- Status: Missing for 18 years, 8 months and 9 days
- Education: Roger-Comtois High School; Neufchâtel High School; Cégep de Jonquière
- Occupations: Audio technician, sales associate
- Height: 170 cm (5 ft 7 in)

On the morning of February 17, 2008, Marilyn Bergeron (born December 21, 1983) left her family's home in Quebec City, Quebec, Canada, for what she said was a walk. She did not return. An automated teller machine (ATM) security camera in Loretteville recorded her attempting to withdraw money early in the afternoon; she was last seen almost five hours after leaving home at a coffee shop in Saint-Romuald. Several sightings of her have been reported since then, especially in areas of Ontario just outside Quebec, but none have been confirmed.

Quebec City police (SPVQ), who continue to investigate, have theorized that Bergeron died by suicide. Her family, who has put up a reward for information leading to the resolution of the case, believes she may have instead met with foul play. Shortly before her disappearance she had moved back to Quebec City from Montreal, where she told her parents, without being specific, that something had happened there and she no longer felt safe living on her own.

Due to this, and the jurisdictional limitations of the SPVQ, the family has repeatedly petitioned the provincial Ministry of Public Security to order the case file transferred to either the Montreal police or the Sûreté du Québec, both of whom they feel could make more progress; the request has been refused. As a result, they have retained former provincial justice minister Marc Bellemare to press their case. Crime journalist Claude Poirier has also devoted an episode of his Historia series Poirier Enquête to the case.

In 2017, a friend who knew Bergeron in Montreal confirmed that she had grown increasingly fearful and reclusive there in the two months before her disappearance. He said he had asked her if she had been raped or witnessed a crime. She said what had happened to her was "worse" than that, but refused to elaborate.

== Background ==
Marilyn Bergeron was born in 1983 in Chicoutimi; the family moved to the Quebec City borough of La Haute-Saint-Charles in 1998. Before then, at the age of 10, she began taking music lessons. At Roger-Comtois High School, her mother, Andrée Bechard, recalls Marilyn always trying to get a band together. Later, she attended Neufchâtel High School, where she furthered her musical interests with extracurricular programs.

In an interview with Claude Poirier, Bergeron's parents recalled her as reckless, sometimes getting in trouble, and having friends who were bad influences. They also said she was open to and interested in all cultures and nationalities. She spoke English and her native French with equal fluency, had learned a little Spanish as well and was starting to learn Russian.

After earning a degree in media arts and technology at Cégep de Jonquière, (Note: "Elle a étudié en Art et Technologie des médias au Cégep de Jonquière et a ensuite travaillé dans la région de Montréal.") and later taking classes at the Joliette campus of the Cégep régional de Lanaudière, Bergeron moved to Montreal in 2005. There she worked as a sales assistant in Steve's Music Store, and did freelance sound editing work for local TV stations. She was also training in finance at Industrial Alliance. Her hope was to become a flight attendant and move to Western Canada within a few years. (Note: "Elle projetait également d’aller vivre dans l'Ouest canadien dans quelques années.")

Early in 2008, Marilyn began telling her family that she no longer felt safe in Montreal and wanted to return to Quebec City. She told her mother that when she did, she would tell her why. On February 10 of that year, she abruptly left her apartment on Hochelaga Street in the Hochelaga-Maisonneuve neighborhood of Montreal, and returned to her parents' house. Six days later, after two more trips to Montreal to retrieve belongings from her apartment, she had finally moved in with her parents again.

During that week, her family said it was obvious something was deeply troubling her. She said she did not want to return to Montreal again. But she would not say why. "We tried to get her to talk but she wouldn't talk, she would only cry", Nathalie told the Montreal Gazette a year later.

Andrée Bechard confronted her daughter about what had happened in Montreal that so perturbed her that she had to return home so quickly and leave behind her life there, apparently for good. Marilyn specifically denied that her problems involved drugs, debts, or a relationship. When Andrée then asked Marilyn if she had been "assaulted", Marilyn said nothing and her face took on a pained expression and she began crying. Andrée said that if she would not talk to her mother, she had to talk to someone, and suggested she talk to a psychologist instead. (Note: "«Quand je lui ai demandé si c’était lié à une peine d’amour, à la drogue, ou à des dettes, elle me répondait systématiquement non. Mais quand je lui ai demandé si elle avait été agressée, elle a pincé la bouche, abaissé les yeux et les larmes ont commencé à couler», raconte sa mère qui lui a alors suggéré de prendre rendez-vous avec un psychologue.")

== Disappearance ==
On the morning of February 17, the day after she had finished relocating herself from Montreal, Marilyn told her parents she was going out for a walk. She was wearing a long black overcoat with gray fake fur trim and suede boots. With the exception of her credit card, she left any other identification at home.

Shortly after 11 a.m., Marilyn stopped at an ATM at the Caisse Populaire on Boulevard de l'Ormière in Loretteville. Her attempt to withdraw CAD$60 was declined. Security camera footage released later shows her looking behind her several times during the encounter. She also had a black backpack slung over one shoulder.

At 4:03 p.m. Marilyn bought a cup of coffee at a Café Dépôt in Saint-Romuald, 20 kilometres (12 mi) south of her parents' house, on the south side of the St. Lawrence River. She paid using her credit card. The clerk, who confirmed that Bergeron was the customer he served, said that she seemed depressed and eager to leave the store. No one has seen her since then, nor has the credit card been used.

== Investigation ==
When Marilyn failed to return home by that evening, her family reported her missing to the Quebec City police, who were soon able to track her banking records to the ATM and the coffee shop. They also began their own efforts to locate her, searching the city themselves, and printing up and distributing flyers with a picture and other information about Marilyn, including a distinctive Pegasus tattoo on her upper right breast visible when she wore low-cut tops. A CAD$10,000 reward was offered. Their efforts also included putting information online; local media also covered the case extensively.

The police would not, at first, let Marilyn's parents see the ATM security video; they considered it too upsetting to show them. When they did see it, Andrée agreed that her daughter looked "helpless". Poirier, in an episode of his Historia series Poirier Enquête devoted to the case, visited the same ATM and believes that Marilyn may have been looking back at a car parked on the street outside, which she could easily have seen from that angle. While it is possible that she could have walked the entire 25 kilometres (16 mi), the shortest route between her house and the Café Dépôt, her family believes it is most likely that she was driven by someone, or hitched a ride. When police released the ATM video on the anniversary of Marilyn's disappearance a year later, they asked if anyone who might have driven her that day could remember it and come forward.

After the initial searches, no new information came to light for almost two years. In January 2010 Poirier was contacted by a man who claimed to have seen Marilyn in Hawkesbury, Ontario, a predominantly Francophone community just over the Ottawa River from Quebec. He claimed to have seen her regularly over the year before he had called; he believed she had settled there, with a younger man, and moved around town several times. Regular customers at a downtown restaurant also said they had seen her there, with a man, after being shown her photo.

Several times during the 2010s, the family made formal requests to the provincial Ministry of Public Security (MPS) to have the case formally transferred to the jurisdiction of either the Sûreté du Québec (SQ) or the Montreal police. The former had province-wide jurisdiction and a reputation as Quebec's most capable law enforcement agency; the latter could investigate in Montreal, where they had come to believe Marilyn's friends and acquaintances from her life there might know more that might be helpful in resolving the case. While they did say the Quebec City police had "done their best", (Note: "La police de Québec a fait son possible ...") the Bergerons were also frustrated that the Quebec City police continued to investigate the case strictly as a disappearance, possibly a suicide, without considering the possibility of criminal involvement.

=== 2017 developments ===
Those requests were regularly rejected, even after the Bergerons personally appealed to then-minister Lise Thériault in a 2015 meeting. At a February 2017 news conference with former provincial justice minister Marc Bellemare, whom they had retained as their lawyer, Bellemare joined them in expressing disappointment that all their requests to transfer the case, or even to allow them to examine the file, had been refused. Both the Quebec police and the SQ responded via the media. "In this case, whenever required, the Sûreté du Québec offered its full cooperation and support to the Quebec City Police Service", an MPS spokeswoman told Journal Metro. (Note: "«Dans ce dossier, chaque fois que requis, la Sûreté du Québec a offert sa pleine collaboration et son soutien au Service de police de la Ville de Québec»") The Quebec City police confirmed that they still saw the case as a disappearance, "but yes, we take it seriously", and had cooperated with other police services and done their best to keep the family informed.

At that same news conference, the Bergerons announced that the reward for information leading to Marilyn's whereabouts had been increased to CAD$30,000. Bellemare announced also that he was setting up a tipline for people whom he believed might have useful information but did not want to contact the police directly. "There are certainly people who know things about what happened to Marilyn", he said. "What we want is to find Marilyn. That's our goal".

At a second press conference that November, the Bergerons announced that the tipline had drawn 43 reports of sightings. They were accompanied by a man who had had some conversations with Marilyn during her last months in Montreal that went into further detail about why she felt she had to leave that city and return home so abruptly.

Jonathan Gauthier, a friend of Marilyn's from college, had reconnected with her in Montreal in late 2007. On December 10, he told the media, he had gone to meet her and go out to a party. At her apartment, he was immediately struck by the difference in Marilyn's demeanor. Instead of being cheerful and upbeat as she had been previously, Gauthier says, she was downcast, listening to music in the dark.

Marilyn's mood lifted somewhat when they went to the party, but then, Gauthier continued, after talking to a friend of hers Marilyn suddenly became anxious, as if that conversation had revived an unpleasant memory, and she asked to go home. Back at her apartment, he said, her mood further deteriorated and she began crying continuously. Attempting to calm her down, Gauthier asked if she had been raped, or witnessed a murder; she emphatically denied both.

Instead, Marilyn told him something worse had happened. Gauthier asked her repeatedly what it was, but she refused to say. "You can't even begin to imagine what I've been through, Jo", he says she told him. "I tried to get her to say what it was for three or four hours", he said. "I got the impression that she did not want to put me in danger".

=== Later developments ===
At an October 2022 news conference in Hawkesbury, Bellemare shared an account of another possible sighting of Marilyn there. Another resident had told Quebec police that one cold and rainy night in December 2009, he and his wife were awakened by a knock on their door at 2 a.m. A young woman was there, wearing only a light jacket, white T-shirt, jeans and high heels, inadequate protection from the weather. Crying, she asked if she could use their phone to call someone else in town.

The couple gave her a towel to dry herself, and she calmed down. She made her call, but did not seem to get an answer. Then she asked for directions to a nearby street. The man offered to drive her there, but she declined, saying it was close enough to walk. After apologizing for disturbing them, she left 10-15 minutes after knocking at the door.

She never returned, and the couple assumed she was just someone who had gotten lost. Three months later, they saw a news report about Marilyn's disappearance and recognized her as the woman who had come to their house that night. She had been blonde rather than brunette, but Marilyn's family said she had sometimes dyed her hair, and showed pictures of her as a blonde at the news conference.

The Hawkesbury man had told Quebec police about the encounter later in 2010; this account had not been made public before the news conference. Béchard, who was also present, believes the woman was her daughter. Other unspecified new information has led the family to believe that she may still be alive and living somewhere in Ontario. She asked anyone who might know anything else to come forward. "If she has a new life and wants to be left alone, we will respect that," she said.

As of 2025, Bergeron remained missing, with law enforcement reporting that the case was still active.

== Legacy ==
In 2023, Russian poet and writer Dmitry Bykov dedicated a long poem to Bergeron.

== See also ==
- 2008 in Canada
- Timeline of Quebec City history
- List of people from Quebec City
- List of people who disappeared
