= Journal of Biomedical Informatics =

- Discipline: Health informatics, translational bioinformatics
- Language: English
- Edited by: Mor Peleg

Publication details
- Former names: Computers and Biomedical Research
- History: 1967–present
- Publisher: Elsevier
- Frequency: Monthly (online only)
- Open access: Hybrid and delayed (after 12 months)
- Impact factor: 6.317 (2020)

Standard abbreviations
- ISO 4: J. Biomed. Inform.

Indexing
- CODEN: JBIOBL
- ISSN: 1532-0464 (print); 1532-0480 (web)
- LCCN: 00212506
- OCLC no.: 45147179

Links
- Journal homepage; Online access

The Journal of Biomedical Informatics is a peer-reviewed scientific journal that covers research in health informatics or in translational bioinformatics. It is considered a premier methodology journal in the field of biomedical informatics. Articles are freely available 12 months after publication. Authors can pay extra for immediate open access at the time of publication. The journal was established by Homer R. Warner in 1967 under the name Computers and Biomedical Research and was renamed beginning with Volume 34 in 2001, when it was redesigned under the leadership of Edward H. Shortliffe as its editor-in-chief. The current editor-in-chief is Mor Peleg.

== Abstracting and indexing ==
According to the Journal Citation Reports, the journal has a 2021 impact factor of 6.317. In addition, the journal is indexed in Biological Abstracts, BIOSIS Previews, CSA Life Sciences Abstracts, Current Contents/Clinical Medicine, EMBASE, Compendex, Inspec, MEDLINE, PASCAL, PubMed, Science Citation Index, and Scopus.

== Journal editors ==
- 1968-1993 Homer R. Warner
- 1994-2001 Allan Pryor
- 2001-2020 Edward Shortliffe
- 2021-now Mor Peleg
