= Patricia Flatley Brennan =

American academic

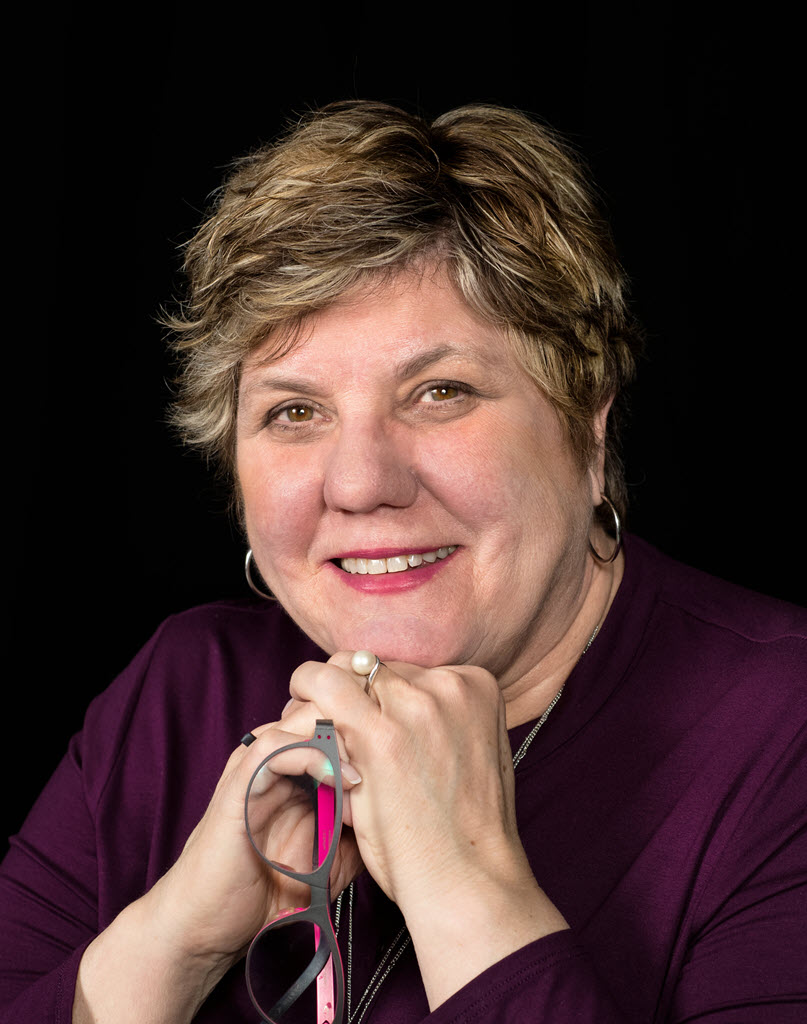
- Education: University of Delaware (BS); University of Pennsylvania (MS); University of Wisconsin, Madison (PhD)
- Scientific career
- Fields: Nursing, industrial engineering, health systems engineering
- Institutions: University of Wisconsin, Madison

Patricia Flatley Brennan was the director of the National Library of Medicine from 2016 to 2023. Prior to that, she was the Lillian L. Moehlman Bascom Professor, School of Nursing and College of Engineering, at the University of Wisconsin–Madison. Brennan received a Master of Science in nursing from the University of Pennsylvania and a Ph.D. in industrial engineering from the University of Wisconsin–Madison. She served as chair of University of Wisconsin–Madison College of Engineering's Department of Industrial Engineering from 2007 to 2010.

== Career ==
Following seven years of clinical practice in critical care nursing and psychiatric nursing, Brennan held several academic positions. She developed ComputerLink, an electronic network designed to reduce isolation and improve self-care among home care patients.

Brennan is the National Program Director of Project HealthDesign, a Robert Wood Johnson Foundation-funded initiative designed to stimulate the next generation of personal health records. In the context of that project, she coined the phrase "Observations of Daily Living" with her team, referring to observations people make about their health in everyday life. Additionally, she leads the WI-TECNE project, a statewide nursing faculty development effort supported by HRSA that aims to improve the integration of informatics and telehealth into nursing curricula. As of June 2009, Brennan was a theme leader of the Living Environments Lab at the Wisconsin Institutes for Discovery, researching home health care technologies using virtual reality and simulation technology.

A fellow of both the American Academy of Nursing (1991) and the American College of Medical Informatics (1993), Brennan was elected a member of the Institute of Medicine in 2001. In 2016, she was appointed director of the National Library of Medicine, where her term started in August 2016. Brennan served in that post until her retirement in September 2023.
