= Annals of Internal Medicine =

American academic journal

- Discipline: Internal medicine
- Language: English
- Edited by: Christine Laine

Publication details
- Former names: Annals of Clinical Medicine, ACP Journal Club
- History: 1927–present
- Publisher: American College of Physicians (United States)
- Frequency: Weekly
- Open access: Hybrid
- Impact factor: 17.3 (2025)

Standard abbreviations
- ISO 4: Ann. Intern. Med.

Indexing
- CODEN: AIMEAS
- ISSN: 0003-4819 (print); 1539-3704 (web)
- LCCN: 43032966
- OCLC no.: 1481385

Links
- Journal homepage; Media resources; Information for authors

Annals of Internal Medicine is an academic medical journal published by the American College of Physicians (ACP). It is one of the most widely cited and influential specialty medical journals in the world. Annals publishes content relevant to the field of internal medicine and related sub-specialties. Annals publishes a wide variety of original research, review articles, practice guidelines, and commentary relevant to clinical practice, health care delivery, public health, health care policy, medical education, ethics, and research methodology. In addition, the journal publishes personal narratives that convey the feeling and the art of medicine. Selected articles in the journal are freely available; these include patient-oriented content and Clinical Guidelines (and related reviews).

== Impact factor ==
The most recent (2025) Impact Factor for Annals of Internal Medicine is 17.3 (Clarivate Analytics). According to the new 2024 Journal Citations Reports, Annals remains the most often cited internal medicine journal.

== Abstracting and indexing ==
The journal is abstracted and indexed in:

- Academic OneFile
- Academic Search
- BIOSIS Previews
- CAB Direct
- Chemical Abstracts
- CINAHL
- Current Contents – Clinical Medicine
- Current contents – Live Science
- Embase
- Global Health
- Index Medicus/MEDLINE/PubMed
- Science Citation Index
- Scopus
- Tropical Diseases Bulletin

== History ==
Annals of Internal Medicine was established in 1927. New content is published online weekly and a hard copy is published on the third Tuesday of each month. ACP previously produced two other journals. The Annals of Medicine was established in 1920 was discontinued by its publisher after a short run. The Annals of Clinical Medicine was renamed to the current title when the ACP took direct control and became publisher. Editors-in-chief have included Aldred Scott Warthin, Carl Weller, Maurice Pincoffs (1933–1960), Paul Clough, J. Russell Elkington (1960–1971), Edward Huth, Robert and Suzanne Fletcher, Frank Davidoff and Harold C. Sox. Peer review was introduced by Elkington. The current editor-in-chief is Christine Laine, MD, MPH, FACP. In May 2008, ACP Journal Club was merged into Annals of Internal Medicine as a monthly feature; previously it was a separate bimonthly journal.

== Notable Articles ==
Notable articles published in Annals of Internal Medicine include:

- In November 2020, the DANMASK-19 (Danish Study to Assess Face Masks for the Protection Against COVID-19 Infection) randomized controlled trial found that in a setting where mask wearing was uncommon, wearing a surgical mask did not reduce incident of SARS-CoV-2 infection compared with no mask recommendation.
- A nationwide cohort study from Statens Serum Institut researchers published in March 2019 found that measles, mumps, and rubella (MMR) vaccination does not increase the risk for autism, does not trigger autism in susceptible children, and is not associated with clustering of autism cases after vaccination.
- In July 2025, another nationwide cohort study from researchers at Statens Serum Institut did not find evidence supporting an increased risk for autoimmune, atopic or allergic, or neurodevelopmental disorders associated with early childhood exposure to aluminum-adsorbed vaccines.
  - On August 1, 2025, United States Secretary of Health and Human Services Robert F. Kennedy Jr., denounced the study and called for the journal to retract it. The journal's Editor-in-Chief, Christine Laine, MD, MPH, rejected his calls for retraction.
- A paper published by CDC researchers in March 2023 described national surveillance data detailing changes in the U.S. epidemiology of candida auris occurring from 2019 to 2021.
- In October 2018, the American College of Physicians (the journal's publisher) published a position paper in Annals of Internal Medicine describing firearm violence as a public health crisis and offered evidence-based strategies to reduce firearms-related injuries and deaths.
  - In response, the National Rifle Association shared a post on X mocking the paper and telling doctors to “stay in their lane.” Physicians and others in support of the position paper responded to the NRA's criticism, using the hashtag #ThisIsOurLane to express that gun violence is a public health issue.
