= Homer R. Warner =

American cardiologist

Homer Richards Warner
- Born: April 18, 1922; Salt Lake City, Utah, USA
- Died: November 30, 2012 (aged 90); Salt Lake City, Utah, USA
- Known for: Medical informatics
- Spouse(s): Katherine Anne Romney (died 2007); Jean Okland (died 2011); June Okland
- Children: 6

Academic background
- Education: University of Utah (B.S., M.D.); University of Minnesota (Ph.D.)

Academic work
- Institutions: Parkland Hospital; Mayo Clinic; University of Utah

Homer Richards Warner (April 18, 1922 – November 30, 2012) was an American cardiologist who was an early proponent of medical informatics who pioneered many aspects of computer applications to medicine. Author of the book, Computer-Assisted Medical Decision-Making, published in 1979, he served as CIO for the University of Utah Health Sciences Center, as president of the American College of Medical Informatics (where an award has been created in his honor), and was actively involved with the National Institutes of Health. He was first chair of the Department of Medical Informatics at the University of Utah School of Medicine, the first American medical program to formally offer a degree in medical informatics.

Dr. Warner was also a senior member of the Institute of Medicine of the National Academy of Sciences and president of the American College of Medical Informatics. For over 25 years, Dr. Warner served almost continuously on research review groups for the National Institutes of Health, the National Center for Health Services Research, and the National Library of Medicine.

== Biography ==
He was born in Salt Lake City on April 18, 1922. He joined the United States Navy during World War II and was trained as a pilot but never saw combat.

Warner received his B.S. in 1946 from the University of Utah. He received his M.D., also from the University of Utah, in 1949. By 1953 he had worked at Parkland Hospital in Dallas, Texas and at the Mayo Clinic in Rochester, Minnesota and had earned a Ph.D. in physiology from the University of Minnesota.

=== Medical Informatics ===
Beginning in the mid-1950s, Dr. Warner began his work using computers for decision support in cardiology at LDS Hospital (now Intermountain Healthcare) in Salt Lake City. This ground-breaking work set the stage for the growth of the new field of academic study called medical informatics. In the 1970s, Dr. Warner and his LDS Hospital colleagues created one of the nation's first versions of an electronic medical record. Designed to assist clinicians in decision-making, Intermountain's HELP system was operational for nearly 40 years.

=== University of Utah ===
Warner and his associates taught computer applications to medicine at the University of Utah, with the Department of Biophysics and Bioengineering being formally established in 1964 within the College of Engineering. In 1974, the department was divided, and Warner continued to lead what became the new Department of Biophysics, which was relocated to the School of Medicine. The name of the department was changed again in 1976 to the Department of Medical Biophysics and Computing, and in 1985 to the Department of Medical Informatics. In 2006, it became the Department of Biomedical Informatics. Warner's leadership as chair of the department continued until 1996. It is the world's first degree-granting program in the field.

During his time at the University of Utah, Warner guided over 200 students through the process of earning their PhDs, in addition to those he taught in the classroom and the lab. A former student described him as hands-on, approachable, and encouraging.

Warner served as director of the cardiovascular laboratory at LDS Hospital from 1954 to 1970 and was honored as Physician of the Year in 1985. In 1988, he was elected to senior membership in the Institute of Medicine of the National Academy of Sciences. New members are chosen for major contributions to health and medicine as well as from related fields.

=== Death ===
He died on November 30, 2012, in Salt Lake City from complications of pancreatitis.

== Awards ==
Morris F. Collen Award.

- Homer Warner wing of the IHC Medical Center in Utah

== Intermountain Homer Warner Center for Informatics Research ==
Intermountain Healthcare officially opened a new center to support its clinical information systems on February 16, 2011, on the campus of Intermountain Medical Center in Salt Lake City. Named after Dr. Warner, the Homer Warner Center for Informatics Research honors one of the industry's recognized fathers of clinical computer systems.

Advanced information systems help caregivers improve medical delivery and outcomes. For example, these systems automate routine functions, facilitate communication among caregivers, support decision-making processes, and allow statistical analysis to help improve care processes and implement best medical practices.

Intermountain has been an industry leader in using computers in the practice of medicine for several decades. Thanks to the hard work and vision of Dr. Homer Warner and his colleagues, Intermountain has a foundation on which to build all of its future information systems. Beginning in the mid-1950s, Dr. Warner began his work using computers for decision support in cardiology at Intermountain's LDS Hospital in Salt Lake City. In the 1970s, Dr. Warner and his Intermountain colleagues created one of the nation's first versions of an electronic medical record. Designed to assist clinicians in decision-making, Intermountain's HELP system was operational for nearly 40 years.

== Homer R. Warner award ==
The award was created by the Object Management Group (OMG), self described as "an international, open membership, not-for-profit computer industry consortium".

It includes a $1000 prize, and is presented each year at the American Medical Informatics Association (AMIA). It is named for Warner. It is awarded for the paper that best describes approaches to improving computerized information acquisition, knowledge data acquisition and management, and experimental results documenting the value of these approaches.

=== Recipients ===
- Dr. Jessica S. Ancker, Associate Professor at Weill Cornell Medicine, in 2016 for her work titled, "Expanding access to high-quality plain-language patient education information through context-specific hyperlinks."
- Dr. Kensaku Kawamoto in 2012.
- Dr. Per H. Gesteland in 2011.
- Dr. Milos Hauskrecht in 2010.
- Dr. Hua Xu in 2009.
- Dr. Joshua C. Denny in 2008.
- Dr. Charlene R. Weir in 2007.
- Dr. Hamish S. F. Fraser, Director of Informatics and Telemedicine for Partners in Health, in 2006.
- Dr. Paul D. Clayton of Intermountain Health Care in 2005.
- Drs. Paul Biondich and David Taylor jointly in 2003.
- Dr. Randolph A. Miller, professor and chair of Biomedical Informatics, and David Sanders, research fellow in Biomedical Informatics, in November 2001.
- Dr. Marcelo Fiszman in 2000
- Dr. Peter Elkin for outstanding contribution to the field of Medical Informatics.

== Bibliography ==
Some relevant books listed at Oregon Health & Science University (OSHU) library:

- Knowledge engineering in health informatics Homer R. Warner, Dean K. Sorenson, Omar Bouhaddou. New York : Springer, c1997.
- Computer-assisted medical decision-making Homer R. Warner. Imprint New York : Academic Press, 1979.

Papers published at Journal of the American Medical Informatics Association

- "Medical informatics: a real discipline?" HR Warner. J Am Med Inform Assoc 1995;2(4):207-214.
- "An event model of medical information representation", SM Huff, RA Rocha, BE Bray, HR Warner, and PJ Haug. J Am Med Inform Assoc 1995;2(2):116-134.

To illustrate his contribution to informatics applied to medicine, on the patent called "Rules-based patient care system for use in healthcare locations" issued on January 1, 2008, the references list includes seven works where he has collaborated.
