= Bryan Bergeron =

American writer

Bryan P. Bergeron is an author of numerous books in the fields of medicine, computers, biotechnology, and business. He teaches in the HST Division of Harvard Medical School and MIT and is president of Archetype Technologies, Inc.

== Publications ==
Books

- Bergeron, B. P. (2002). Essentials of CRM : a guide to customer relationship management. Wiley.
- Bergeron, B. P. (2001). The wireless Web : how to develop and execute a winning wireless strategy. McGraw-Hill.
- Bergeron, B. P. (2003). Essentials of knowledge management (1st edition). J. Wiley.
- Bergeron, B. P., & Chan, P. (2004). Biotech industry : a global, economic, and financing overview. J. Wiley.
- Bergeron, B. P., & Blander, J. (2002). Business expectations : are you using technology to its fullest? (1st edition). J. Wiley.
- Bergeron, B. P. (2002). Dark Ages II : when the digital data die. Prentice Hall PTR.
- Bergeron, B. P. (2003). Essentials of shared services. John Wiley & Sons.
- Bergeron, B. P. (2001). The eternal e-customer : how emotionally intelligent interfaces can create long-lasting customer relationships. McGraw-Hill.

Articles and papers

- Bergeron, Bryan. 2007. “Physics-Based Animation for Qualitative Assessment of Biomimetic Subterranean Burrowing Behaviors.” 2007 International Symposium on Computational Intelligence in Robotics and Automation, Computational Intelligence in Robotics and Automation, 2007. CIRA 2007. International Symposium On, June, 85–89.
- Bergeron, Bryan P. 2015. “The Effect of Technology on the Written Tradition of Medicine.” Perspectives in Biology and Medicine 41 (4): 572–78. https://doi.org/10.1353/pbm.1998.0034.
- Bergeron, Bryan, Michael Hagen, Lars Peterson, Ross Dworkin, Charles Bono, Todd Graham, and Mary Williams. 2019. “Comparison of AR, ITS, CBT, and Didactic Training and Evaluation of Retinopathy-Based Diagnosis.” Military Medicine 184 (November): 579–83. https://doi.org/10.1093/milmed/usy372.
- Bergeron, B. P. (2003). Telemedicine in the practice setting: Infrastructure, not technology, limits practical application. Postgraduate Medicine, 114(1), 9–12. https://doi.org/10.3810/pgm.2003.07.1462
