= Edward H. Shortliffe =

Canadian academic

Edward Hance Shortliffe
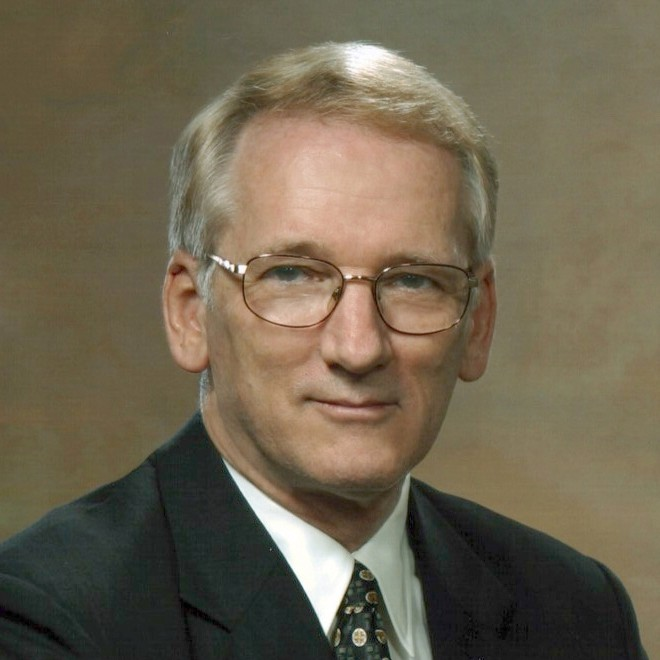
- Shortliffe in 2002
- Born: 1947 (age 78–79); Edmonton, Alberta, Canada
- Other name: Ted
- Education: Harvard University; Stanford University
- Known for: MYCIN, Biomedical informatics
- Website: www.shortliffe.net

Edward ("Ted") Hance Shortliffe (born 1947) is a Canadian-born American biomedical informatician, physician, and computer scientist. Shortliffe is a pioneer in the use of artificial intelligence in medicine. He was the principal developer of the clinical expert system MYCIN, one of the first rule-based artificial intelligence expert systems, which obtained clinical data interactively from a physician user and was used to diagnose and recommend treatment for severe infections. His research has focused on artificial intelligence in medicine and biomedical informatics education.

He is also regarded as a founder of the field of biomedical informatics, and in 2006 received one of its highest honors, the Morris F. Collen Award of Excellence given by the American College of Medical Informatics.

In July 2009, Shortliffe assumed a position as president and chief executive officer of the American Medical Informatics Association, an organization that he helped to form between 1988 and 1990 when he was President of the Symposium on Computer Applications in Medical Care.

== Early life and education ==
Shortliffe was born in Alberta and moved to the United States with his parents.

He attended Loomis School (now Loomis Chaffee School) in Connecticut and later an exchange student year at Gresham's School in the United Kingdom.

Shortliffe graduated magna cum laude from Harvard College in 1970 with an A.B. in applied mathematics (computer science). He subsequently attended Stanford University, earning a Ph.D. in Medical Information Sciences in 1975 an M.D. in 1976. He enrolled in the Medical Scientist Training Program and won a Grace Murray Hopper Award from the Association for Computing Machinery.

== Career ==
=== Stanford University ===
After completing residency training in internal medicine at Massachusetts General Hospital and Stanford Hospital between 1976 and 1979, Shortliffe joined the Stanford University faculty in General Internal Medicine.

At Stanford, he became director of the Medical Information Sciences Training Program from 1982 till 2000.

In 1980, he established one of the earliest formal graduate training programs in biomedical informatics at Stanford University.

=== Columbia University ===
In 2000, Shortliffe joined Columbia University as chair of the Department of Biomedical Informatics. He also served as deputy vice president of Columbia University Medical Center, senior associate dean for strategic information resources, professor of medicine, professor of computer science, and director of medical informatics services for NewYork-Presbyterian Hospital.

=== University of Arizona and Arizona State University ===
In March 2007, Shortliffe became the founding dean of the Phoenix campus of the University of Arizona College of Medicine, which was created as a collaborative effort between the University of Arizona and Arizona State University (ASU). At ASU he was also appointed as a Professor of Biomedical Informatics.

=== American Medical Informatics Association ===
In July 2009, Shortliffe became president and chief executive officer of the American Medical Informatics Association (AMIA).

== Research and contributions ==
Shortliffe served as Editor-in-Chief of a leading biomedical informatics scientific journal (Journal of Biomedical Informatics) from 2001 to 2020.

== Publications ==
Shortliffe is the author or co-author of more than 350 scientific publications and several books.

=== Selected books ===
- Computer-Based Medical Consultations: MYCIN (1976). ISBN 978-0-444-00179-5
- Rule-Based Expert Systems: The MYCIN Experiments of the Stanford Heuristic Programming Project (1984). ISBN 0201101726
- Readings in Medical Artificial Intelligence: The First Decade (1984). ISBN 0201110598
- Biomedical Informatics: Computer Applications in Health Care and Biomedicine (five editions between 1990 and 2021). ISBN 978-3-030-58721-5, 978-3-030-58720-8
- Intelligent Systems in Medicine and Health: The Role of AI (2022). ISBN 978-3-031-09108-7, 978-3-031-09107-0

== Honors ==
- Morris F. Collen Award for Distinguished Contributions to Medical Informatics, American Medical Informatics Association, (2006)
- Appointed Rolf H. Scholdager Professor of Biomedical Informatics, Columbia University, (2005)
- National Associate, National Academies, Washington, DC, December 2004.
- Mastership, American College of Physicians, (2002)
- Young Investigator Award, Western Society for Clinical Investigation, (1987)
- Henry J. Kaiser Family Foundation Faculty Scholar in General Internal Medicine, July 1983—June 1988.
- Research Career Development Award, National Library of Medicine, July 1979—June 1984.
- Grace Murray Hopper Award (Distinguished computer scientist under age 30), Association for Computing Machinery, October 1976
