= Journal of the American Medical Informatics Association =

- Discipline: Health informatics
- Language: English
- Edited by: Suzanne Bakken

Publication details
- History: 1994–present
- Publisher: Oxford University Press
- Frequency: Monthly
- Impact factor: 4.6 (2024)

Standard abbreviations
- ISO 4: J. Am. Med. Inform. Assoc.

Indexing
- ISSN: 1067-5027 (print); 1527-974X (web)
- LCCN: sn93004712
- OCLC no.: 27252647

Links
- Journal homepage; Online access; Online archive

The Journal of the American Medical Informatics Association is a monthly peer-reviewed medical journal covering research in the field of health informatics published by the American Medical Informatics Association.

According to the Journal Citation Reports, the journal has a 2024 impact factor of 4.6.
