= Eric Rimm =

American nutrition scientist and epidemiologist

- Born: Eric Bruce Rimm; Buffalo, New York
- Education: University of Wisconsin—Madison Computer Science; Harvard School of Public Health Epidemiology
- Known for: Chronic disease epidemiology
- Awards: American Society for Nutrition General Mills Bell Institute of Health and Nutrition Innovation Award (2012)
- Scientific career
- Fields: Epidemiology; Nutrition science
- Institutions: Harvard School of Public Health; Harvard Medical School
- Thesis: Etiologic and methodologic studies of cardiovascular diseases in the Health Professionals Follow-up Study (1991)

Eric Bruce Rimm is an American nutrition scientist and epidemiologist. He is Professor of Epidemiology and Nutrition at the Harvard School of Public Health, Professor of Medicine at Harvard Medical School, and director of the Harvard School of Public Health's Program in Cardiovascular Epidemiology. He has researched the relationship between diet and the risk of chronic diseases such as obesity. Rimm was associated with the NIH-funded Moderate Alcohol and Cardiovascular Health (MACH15) study, which was terminated in 2018 after an NIH investigation found inappropriate interactions between study organizers, NIH officials, and alcohol industry representatives, and raised concerns that the study had been framed in a manner favorable to demonstrating protective effects of moderate alcohol consumption.
