= American Medical Informatics Association =

American non-profit organization

- Abbreviation: AMIA
- Formation: 1989, merger of NGOs incorporated in 1972
- Type: NGO
- Legal status: NPO
- Purpose: Professional association
- Headquarters: Washington, D.C.
- Members: 5,585
- Official language: English
- President and Chair of the Board: Philip R. O. Payne, PhD
- Chief Executive Officer: Amanda Hanova, MSM, LSSGB
- Website: www.amia.org

The American Medical Informatics Association (AMIA), is an American non-profit organization dedicated to the development and application of biomedical and health informatics in the support of patient care, teaching, research, and health care administration.

== History ==
AMIA is the official United States representative to the International Medical Informatics Association. It has grown to more than 5,000 members from 42 countries worldwide. Together, these members represent all basic, applied, and clinical interests in health care information technology. It publishes the Journal of the American Medical Informatics Association.

AMIA is a professional scientific association that was formed by the merger of three organizations in 1988: the American Association for Medical Systems and Informatics (AAMSI); the American College of Medical Informatics (ACMI); and the Symposium on Computer Applications in Medical Care (SCAMC).

== Founding ==
AMIA was founded in 1989 by the merger of three organizations:

- American Association for Medical Systems and Informatics
- American College of Medical Informatics
- Symposium on Computer Applications in Medical Care

== Leadership ==
As a professional society, AMIA leadership includes member-leaders who are elected annually from the membership. Until 2004, AMIA was led by an elected president and chair of the Board of Directors, who worked closely with the organization's professional executive director. In 2004, AMIA created the role of a full-time, staff President and CEO, and changed the elected leadership role to chair of the board.

The first President and CEO of AMIA was Don E. Detmer. He was succeeded in July 2009 by Edward H. Shortliffe. In March 2012, he was succeeded by Kevin Fickenscher. In 2013, he was succeeded by Douglas B. Fridsma, who served until December, 2019.

Beginning in 2020, AMIA updated the leadership structure, changing the staff "President and CEO" role to "CEO," and the elected "Chair of the Board" back to the previously title of "President and Chair of the Board." The current President and chair of the Board is Philip R. O. Payne. The current Chief Executive Officer is Amanda Hanova, MSM, LSSGB.

== Membership ==
AMIA membership is open to individuals, institutions, and corporations. Members include physicians, nurses, dentists, pharmacists, clinicians, health information technology professionals, computer and information scientists, biomedical engineers, consultants and industry representatives, medical librarians, academic researchers and educators, and advanced students pursuing a career in clinical informatics or health information technology.

== Meetings, education and certifications ==
AMIA annually holds the following meetings:

- AMIA Annual Symposium
- The AMIA Informatics Summit comprising:
  - AMIA Summit on Translational Bioinformatics
  - AMIA Summit on Clinical Research Informatics
- AMIA Clinical Informatics

From 2026, AMIA has merged the AMIA Informatics Summit and the AMIA Clinical Informatics conferences into a single one:

- AMIA Amplify Informatics Conference

AMIA facilitates two certifications:

- Clinical Informatics Subspecialty
- AMIA Health Informatics Certification (AHIC)

== Working and special interest groups ==
The association includes a number of special interest and working groups on a variety of issues important to its membership.

== See also ==
- eHealth
