= American College of Medical Informatics =

- Abbreviation: ACMI
- Formation: 1984; 42 years ago
- Type: NGO
- Legal status: NPO
- Purpose: Learned society
- Headquarters: Bethesda, MD
- Members: 300
- Official language: English
- President: Peter Embí
- Key people: Kevin Johnson, Past President; Jessica Tennenbaum, President-Elect
- Main organ: Inducted Fellows; Executive Committee
- Website: https://www.amia.org/programs/acmi-fellowship

The American College of Medical Informatics (ACMI) is a college of elected fellows from the United States and abroad who have made significant and sustained contributions to the field of medical informatics. Initially incorporated in 1984, the organization later dissolved its separate corporate status to merge with the American Association for Medical Systems and Informatics (AAMSI) and the Symposium on Computer Applications in Medical Care (SCAMC) when the American Medical Informatics Association (AMIA) was formed in 1989. The college now exists as an elected body of fellows within AMIA, with its own bylaws and regulations that guide the organization, its activities, and its relationship with the parent organization. The college is fiscally self-sufficient, and its officers prepare and submit its financial plan annually for approval by the AMIA Board of Directors.

== History ==
The college was initially created using an election process that assured that the founding fellows would be elected by their peers. Five individuals, Marsden S. Blois, Morris F. Collen, Donald A. B. Lindberg, Thomas E. Piemme, and Edward H. Shortliffe, prepared a ballot of over 100 names of leaders in the field and sent the ballot to all listed individuals. Nominees were asked to vote for 50 colleagues to become the founding fellows, and in this way the initial set of 52 fellows was selected (three individuals were tied for the fiftieth place). The founding fellows then incorporated, elected officers, and initiated a process through which the existing fellows nominate and elect new fellows. Piemme handled office management out of the George Washington University Office of CME; Collen served as the initial interim leader though there were no formal officers until founding fellows elected its first president whose term began on January 1, 1987.

The number of people and international associates elected through the years has now reached close the 300 inducted Fellows of the ACMI, with approximately fifteen to twenty new fellows and international associates elected each year. Photographs of people elected through 1993 were published in the inaugural issue of JAMIA, the Journal of the American Medical Informatics Association, in January 1994, and each year's class of newly elected fellows is published in JAMIA.

Presidents of the College
| Name | Year Started |
|---|---|
| Marsden Blois | 1987 |
| Homer R. Warner | 1989 |
| Octo Barnett | 1991 |
| Edward H. Shortliffe | 1993 |
| Ed Hammond | 1995 |
| Robert Greenes | 1997 |
| William Stead | 1999 |
| Charles Friedman | 2001 |
| Randolph Miller | 2003 |
| Judy Ozbolt | 2005 |
| Daniel Masys | 2007 |
| Joyce Mitchell | 2009 |
| James J. Cimino | 2011 |
| Alexa T. McCray | 2013 |
| Suzanne Bakken | 2015 |
| Christopher G. Chute | 2017 |
| William Tierney | 2019 |
| Genevieve Melton-Meaux | 2021 |
| Kevin Johnson | 2023 |
| Peter Embi | 2025 |

== See also ==
- Directory of American College of Medical Informatics (ACMI) Fellows, with biographies, on the AMIA/ACMI Website
- List of members of the American College of Medical Informatics with biographies on Wikipedia
- American Medical Informatics Association
