= Nicholas Tatonetti =

American bioscientist and academic

Nicholas Pierino Tatonetti
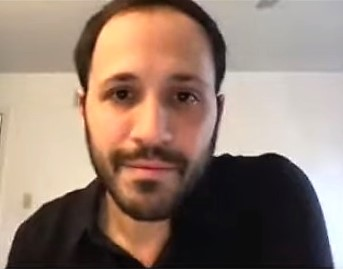
- Tatonetti presents The C19 Weekly in 2020
- Education: Stanford University; Arizona State University
- Scientific career
- Workplaces: Cedars-Sinai Medical Center; Columbia University
- Thesis: Data-driven detection, prediction, and validation of drug-drug interactions (2012)
- Doctoral advisor: Russ Altman
- Website: Tatonetti Lab

Nicholas Pierino Tatonetti (May 27th, 1983) is an American bioscientist who is Vice Chair of Operations in the Department of Computational Biomedicine and Associate Director of Computational Oncology in the Cancer Center at Cedars-Sinai Medical Center in Los Angeles, California.

Tatonetti's research focuses on the integration of clinical and molecular data, including electronic health records and genomics databases, to investigate drug safety, drug–drug interactions, and cancer pharmacology. This is accomplished by combining electronic health records and genomics databases with artificial intelligence and machine learning. His lab aims to advance pharmacological knowledge and ensure that findings benefit diverse populations, with particular attention to communities historically underrepresented in biomedical research.

== Early life and education ==
Tatonetti is originally from Cleveland, Ohio. In 2008, Tatonetti double-majored with bachelors degrees in Computational Mathematical Sciences as well as Molecular Biosciences and Biotechnology at the Tempe campus of Arizona State University. In his senior year at ASU, he was elected to Phi Beta Kappa, and graduated Summa Cum Laude.

He went on to Stanford University as a graduate researcher in biomedical informatics, where he was advised under Russ Altman. Fellow graduate researchers during his doctoral studies include Joel Dudley and Noah Zimmerman. As a co-curricular, Tatonetti and Zimmerman hosted The Nick and Noah Show on KZSU radio from 2010 to 2012. Over the span of the show, they interviewed notable faculty at Stanford, including Michael P. Snyder, David Spiegel, and Nobel Laureate Andrew Fire.

During his PhD, Tatonetti developed a classifier to detect side effects of drugs based on data available by FAERS. His dissertation, titled Data-driven detection, prediction, and validation of drug-drug interactions, focused on the development of novel statistical and computational methods for observational data mining. His dissertation committee included Altman, Atul J. Butte, Trevor Hastie, and Phil Tsao. He received his MS and PhD in Biomedical Informatics from Stanford University School of Medicine in 2012.

== Research and career ==
In 2012, Tatonetti started his teaching career as the Herbert Irving Assistant Professor of Biomedical Informatics at Columbia University. He moved up to Associate Professor in 2019. In 2017, he became both the Director of Clinical Informatics at the Institute for Genomic Medicine and the Co-Director of Bioinformatics at the Department of Biomedical Informatics at Columbia. During his tenure at Columbia, notable collaborators included Brent Stockwell, Suzanne Bakken, and David Goldstein.

In 2014, Tattonetti published a groundbreaking study revealing a statistical correlation between birth month and the likelihood of different disease diagnoses later in life. This intriguing finding captured global attention, leading to the study becoming the most downloaded paper in the history of the Journal of the American Medical Informatics Association (JAMIA). Notably, it also marked Tattonetti's research's sole mention in Vogue magazine to date.

From 2016 to 2018, Tatonetti collaborated with Pulitzer Prize-winning journalist Sam Roe of the Chicago Tribune. During their two-year collaboration, Tatonetti was introduced to the physician Raymond Woosley, who provided a list of medications known to cause QT prolongation of the heart. From that initial data, they discovered that ceftriaxone and lansoprazole prescribed together induce heart arrhythmias in patients.

In 2018, Tatonetti and Zimmerman along with illustrator and educator Cybil Sanzetenea co-authored the board book Toshi Builds Consensus: A blockchain primer for kids (and grown-ups). Published in 2020, the purpose was creating a book to expose K-12 students to STEM literacy early in the likelihood this will encourage them to develop careers in STEM as adults.

In 2020, Tatonetti hosted The C19 Weekly videocast on the American Medical Informatics Association website, where he discussed the recent data science and bioinformatics-oriented COVID-19 research papers.

In addition to his teaching responsibilities at Columbia, in 2013, he became the Director of Clinical Informatics at Herbert Irving Comprehensive Cancer Center. In 2022, he was promoted to Chief Officer for Cancer Data Science.

In 2023, Tatonetti joined Cedars-Sinai Medical Center as the vice chair of Computational Biomedicine and associate director for Computational Oncology. He is a key contributor to the Molecular Twin project, which involves collecting genetic data from cancer patients to create virtual models to better understand the unique attributes of their cancer. This would allow healthcare practitioners at Cedars-Sinai to identify personalized treatment strategies for each patient (i.e. pharmacogenomics).

In January 2025, Tatonetti was named the new co-editor-in-chief of BioData Mining with his colleague Jason H. Moore.

== Personal life ==
Tatonetti has described himself as pansexual and gender non-conforming. Their life partner is former Olympic swimmer Cassidy Krug.

== Selected publications ==
- Zietz, Michael; Zucker, Jason; Nicholas P. Tatonetti (2020). "Associations between blood type and COVID-19 infection, intubation, and death". Nature Communications. 11 (1): 5761. Bibcode:2020NatCo..11.5761Z. doi:10.1038/s41467-020-19623-x. PMID 33188185. Wikidata Q102058933.
- Scott J Dixon; Darpan N Patel; Matthew Welsch; et al. (2014). "Pharmacological inhibition of cystine-glutamate exchange induces endoplasmic reticulum stress and ferroptosis". eLife. 3 e02523. doi:10.7554/elife.02523. PMC 4054777. PMID 24844246. Wikidata Q33745283.
- Tatonetti, Nicholas P; Ye, Patrick P; Daneshjou, Roxana; Altman, Russ B (2012). "Data-driven prediction of drug effects and interactions". Science Translational Medicine. 4 (125): 125ra31. doi:10.1126/scitranslmed.3003377. PMC 3382018. PMID 22422992. Wikidata Q24599300.
