= Russ Altman =

American biomedical scientist and academic

Russ Biagio Altman
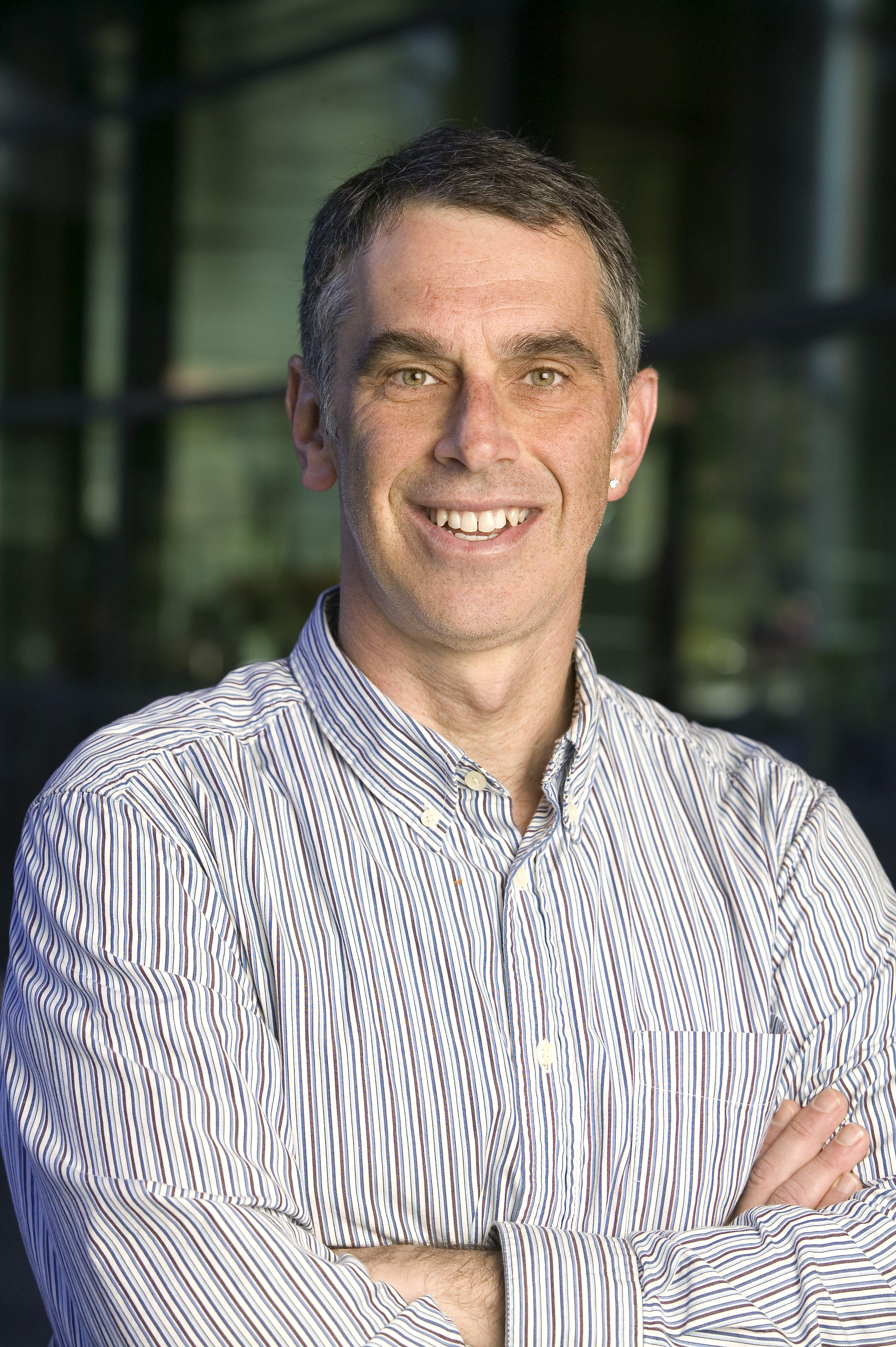
- Altman in 2007
- Born: Brooklyn, New York
- Education: Harvard College; Stanford University
- Scientific career
- Institutions: Stanford University
- Thesis: Exclusion methods for the determination of protein structure from experimental data (1989)
- Doctoral students: Nicholas Tatonetti; Olga Troyanskaya; Soumya Raychaudhuri

External videos
- What really happens when you mix medications?, 14:41, TED talks

Russ Biagio Altman is an American professor of bioengineering, genetics, medicine, and biomedical data science (and of computer science, by courtesy) and past chairman of the bioengineering department at Stanford University. He is also an associate director and senior fellow at the Stanford Institute for Human-Centered Artificial Intelligence.

== Education ==
Altman holds an A.B. in biochemistry & molecular biology from Harvard College in 1983, a Ph.D. in medical information sciences from Stanford in 1989 and M.D. from Stanford Medical School in 1990. After his internship at Stanford, he became board certified in 1991 in internal medicine and in clinical informatics in 2014. After a year of post-doctoral research, he joined the faculty as assistant professor in 1992. He became full professor in 2004, and was chair of the department of bioengineering from 2007 to June 2012. He was the Kenneth Fong Professor of Engineering at Stanford, and an advisor to the Chan Zuckerberg Biohub from 2016- 2021. As of 2018, Altman was a founding co-editor of the Annual Review of Biomedical Data Science. As of 2021, Russ Altman was the lead editor.

== Research and career ==
His primary research interests are in the application of computing and informatics technologies to problems relevant to medicine. He is particularly interested in methods for understanding drug action at molecular, cellular, organism and population levels. His lab studies how human genetic variation impacts drug response, helping start the PharmGKB project in 2000. Other work focuses on the analysis of biological molecules to understand the actions, interactions and adverse events of drugs, publishing a database called FEATURE in 2003. He helps lead an FDA-supported center for regulatory science and innovation (CERSI). He chaired the Science Board advising the FDA Commissioner, serves on the NIH director’s advisory committee, and is co-chair of the IOM Drug Forum. He is an organizer of the annual Pacific Symposium on Biocomputing. He co-founded Personalis, Inc. In 2011 along with three other faculty members including Euan Ashley, Atul Butte, Michael Snyder and businessman John West. In 2017, he started hosting a show on SiriusXM (Insight Channel 121) titled "The Future of Everything". He is clinically active with a pharmacogenomics consultative service at Stanford Healthcare.

== Awards and honors ==
Altman received the U.S. Presidential Early Career Award for Scientists and Engineers (1997) and a National Science Foundation CAREER Award (1996). He is a fellow of the American College of Physicians (ACP), the American College of Medical Informatics (ACMI), the American Institute for Medical and Biological Engineering (AIMBE), and the American Association for the Advancement of Science (AAAS). He is a member of the National Academy of Medicine (formerly the Institute of Medicine) of the National Academies. He was president (2000 to 2002), founding board member, and a Fellow of the International Society for Computational Biology (ISCB), and-president of the American Society for Clinical Pharmacology & Therapeutics (ASCPT) from March 2013 to 2014.

He received the Stanford Medical School graduate teaching award in 2000, and mentorship award in 2014.

In 2018, Altman was awarded the ISCB Outstanding Contributions Award.

In 2020, Russ Altman received the ISCB Outstanding Contributions Award.

In 2023, He won the Stanford Medicine Alumni Kornberg-Berg Lifetime Achievement Award.

Preceded by Lawrence Hunter	President of the International Society for Computational Biology; 2000 – 2002	Succeeded by Philip Bourne
