= Annual Review of Biomedical Data Science =

- Language: English
- Edited by: Russ Altman

Publication details
- History: 2018; 8 years ago
- Publisher: Annual Reviews (US)
- Frequency: Annually
- Open access: Subscribe to Open
- Impact factor: 8.1 (2025)

Standard abbreviations
- ISO 4: Annu. Rev. Biomed. Data Sci.

Indexing
- ISSN: 2574-3414

Links
- Journal homepage

The Annual Review of Biomedical Data Science is an academic journal published by Annual Reviews (AR). In publication since 2018, this journal covers significant developments in the field of health informatics and biomedical data science with an annual volume of review articles. It is edited by Russ Altman. As of 2023, it is being published as open access, under the Subscribe to Open model. As of 2026, Journal Citation Reports lists the journal's impact factor as 8.1, ranking it second out of 67 journals.

== History ==
The Annual Review of Biomedical Data Science was first published in 2018 by Annual Reviews (AR), a nonprofit organization whose stated mission is to synthesize knowledge "for the progress of science and the benefit of society." The journal focuses on biomedical data science, the development of scientific methods to acquire, annotate, organize, analyze, and interpret biomedical data and extract knowledge about life, health, and disease. The founding co-editors were Russ B. Altman and Michael Levitt. As of 2021, Altman was the lead editor.

== Scope and indexing ==
The Annual Review of Biomedical Data Science is abstracted and indexed in Science Citation Index Expanded, Scopus and BIOSIS Previews, among others.

== Editorial processes ==
The Annual Review of Biomedical Data Science is helmed by the editor or the co-editors. The editor is assisted by the editorial committee, which includes associate editors, regular members, and occasionally guest editors. Guest members participate at the invitation of the editor, and serve terms of one year. All other members of the editorial committee are appointed by the AR board of directors and serve five-year terms. The editorial committee determines which topics should be included in each volume and solicits reviews from qualified authors. Unsolicited manuscripts are not accepted. Peer review of accepted manuscripts is undertaken by the editorial committee.

=== Current editorial board ===
As of 2023, the editorial committee consists of the editor and the following members:

- M. Madan Babu
- Søren Brunak
- Jianfeng Feng
- Artemis Hatzigeorgiou
- Maricel Kann
- Marylyn D. Ritchie
- Cathal Seoighe
- Nicholas Tatonetti
- Olga Troyanskaya
