= Harpalus serripes =

Scientific classification
- Kingdom: Animalia
- Phylum: Arthropoda
- Class: Insecta
- Order: Coleoptera
- Suborder: Adephaga
- Family: Carabidae
- Genus: Harpalus
- Species: H. serripes

Binomial name
- Harpalus serripes (Quensel in Schonherr, 1806)

Synonyms
- Harpalus subchalybaeus Reitter, 1900

Species of beetle

Harpalus serripes is a species of black coloured ground beetle which can be found in the Palearctic realm and the Near East. In Europe, it can be found in Albania, Benelux, Greece, Italy, Lithuania, Portugal, Spain, Sweden, Ukraine, all states of former Yugoslavia, Central Europe, and southern and central parts of Russia. It is also found in such Near Eastern countries as Armenia, Georgia, Kazakhstan, and Kyrgyzstan, and into Algeria of North Africa.

== Description ==
The species have a pair of lateral teeth that are located on each side. It mandible is simple, with its setae and tergum are both long. The first instar egg-bursters have only one tooth, while its femora have up to 10 setae. Its anal tube is 0.6 millimetres (0.024 in) in length, which is the same length of its head, and is shorter than its cersi.

== Further distribution ==
A female species was found in Wallasey sandhills in March 1882.
