= Jason H. Moore =

American geneticist and bioinformatician

- Education: Florida State University; University of Michigan
- Known for: Multifactor dimensionality reduction
- Awards: Fellow of AAAS, ACMI, AMIA, ASA
- Scientific career
- Fields: Artificial Intelligence; Machine Learning; Translational Bioinformatics; Biomedical Informatics; Human Genetics
- Workplaces: Vanderbilt University; Dartmouth College; University of Pennsylvania; Cedars-Sinai Medical Center
- Thesis: Genetic analyses of dynamic quantitative traits (1999)
- Academic advisors: Charles F. Sing
- Notable students: Marylyn D. Ritchie

Jason Hall Moore is an American geneticist and biomedical informatician. He is Chair of the Department of Computational Biomedicine and Director of the Center for AI Research and Education at Cedars-Sinai Medical Center in Los Angeles. He holds adjunct faculty appointments at the University of Pennsylvania and the University of California, Los Angeles.

== Biography ==
He was a founding Director of the Advanced Computing Center for Research and Education at Vanderbilt University from 2000 until 2004 and founding Director of the Institute for Quantitative Biomedical Sciences at Geisel School of Medicine of Dartmouth College from 2010 until 2015. He was also the founding Director of the Institute for Biomedical Informatics, founding Director of the Division of Informatics, and founding Senior Associate Dean for Informatics at the Perelman School of Medicine at the University of Pennsylvania from 2015 until 2021.

He was editor-in-chief of the open-access BioData Mining journal from 2008 until 2025.

== Research ==
Moore's research focuses on the development and application of artificial intelligence and machine learning methods for modeling complex patterns in biomedical big data. A central focus is using informatics methods for identifying combinations of DNA sequence variations and environmental factors that are predictive of human health and complex disease. For example, he developed the multifactor dimensionality reduction (MDR) machine learning method for detecting and characterizing combinations of attributes or independent variables that interact to influence a dependent or class variable. He then applied MDR for an improved understanding of the interplay of multiple genetic polymorphisms of complex traits in genome-wide association studies. More recent work focuses on computational methods such as the tree-based pipeline optimization tool (TPOT) for automated machine learning and data science. Current work also focuses on methods and software for accessible artificial intelligence. He is an early pioneer in the development of agentic AI methods and software for searching graph databases and automating data science.

He is a former member of the National Library of Medicine grant review committee (BLIRC). He was the founding Editor-in-Chief of the journal BioData Mining. He has published more than 600 peer-reviewed articles, book chapters and editorials. His health AI research program has been continuously funded by multiple grants from the National Institutes of Health for more than 25 years.

== Honors ==
In 2011 he was elected as a Fellow of the American Association for the Advancement of Science (AAAS) and was selected as a Kavli Fellow of the National Academy of Sciences (NAS) in 2013. In 2015 he was elected a Fellow of the American College of Medical Informatics (ACMI). In 2017 he was elected a Fellow of the American Statistical Association (ASA). In 2021 he was elected a Fellow of the International Academy of Health Sciences Informatics (IAHSI). In 2021 he was elected a Member of the International Statistics Institute (ISI). In 2025 he was elected a Fellow of the American Medical Informatics Association (AMIA).
