= Gene Relationships Across Implicated Loci =

Gene Relationships Across Implicated Loci (GRAIL) is a free web application developed by Soumya Raychaudhuri at the Broad Institute with the goal of determining the relationships among genes in different disease associated loci through statistical analysis.

== Mode of operation ==
When single-nucleotide polymorphisms (SNPs) are identified through a genome-wide association study (GWAS) as being possibly linked to a human disease, GRAIL works by comparing those with SNPs already identified in the scientific literature as being tied to the disease (using a text-mining algorithm going through PubMed abstracts), and determines the degree of functional connectivity among the associated genes. SNPs identified with this method have been shown to be replicated in independent sets at a much higher probability than randomly selected ones. GRAIL has also demonstrated better performance than other published algorithms.

However, the software is still in its Beta phase, and has shown varied levels of success depending on the phenotype in question.
