= Scientist.com (company) =

Network of e-commerce marketplaces

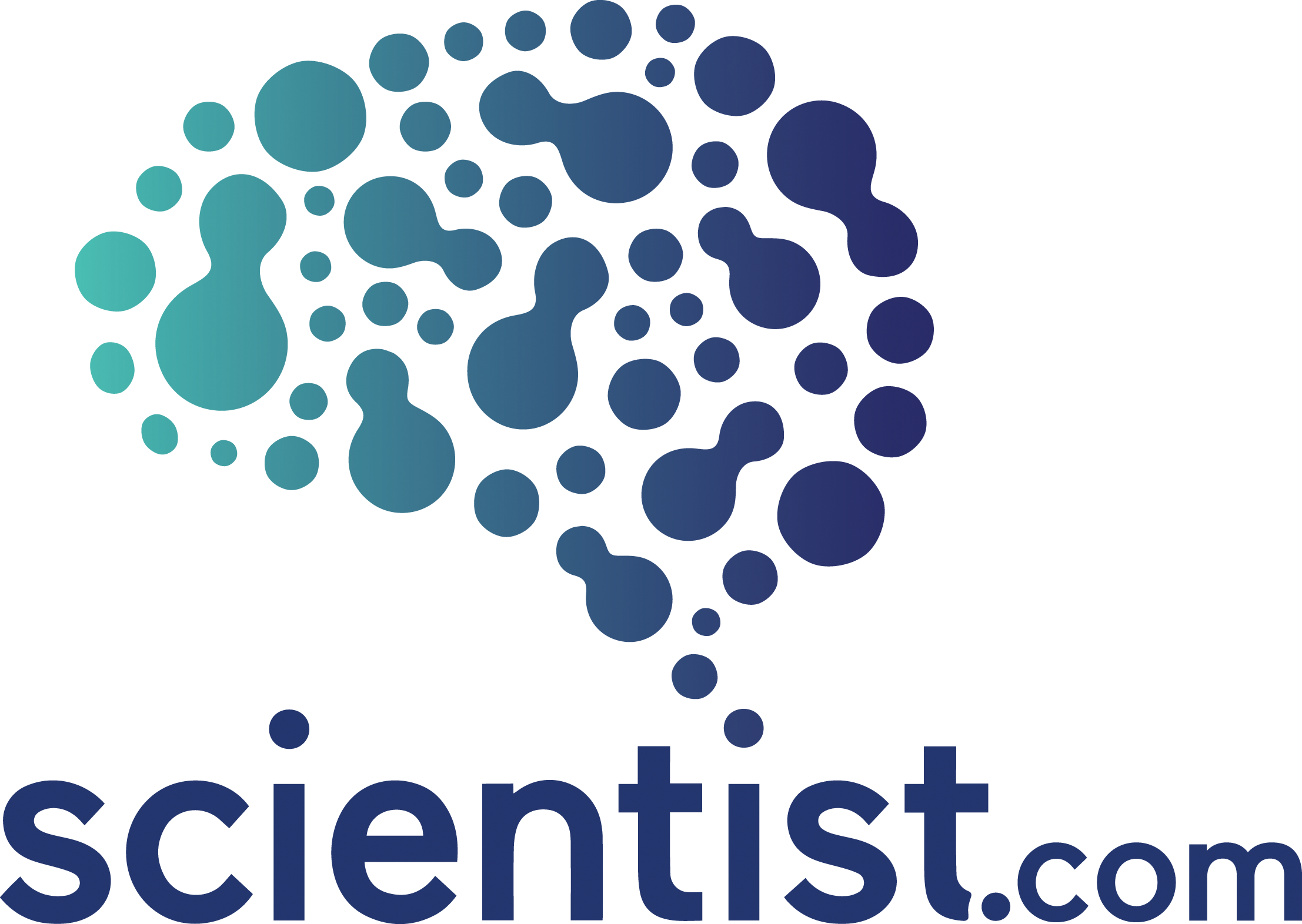
- Type: Private
- Industry: Science; Online marketplace
- Founded: 2007
- Founders: Kevin Lustig, Chris Petersen, Andrew Martin
- Headquarters: Solana Beach, California, United States
- Key people: Kevin Lustig (Founder & CEO); Chris Petersen (Founder & CIO); Diana Ourthiague (CCO); Daniel Kagan (COO)
- Number of employees: 92 full-time employees (February 2026)
- Website: scientist.com

Scientist.com (formerly known as Assay Depot) is a network of public and private e-commerce marketplaces that connect buyers and sellers of scientific research services. The company was founded in 2007 by Kevin Lustig, Chris Petersen and Andrew Martin and launched its first public research marketplace in September 2008.

== History ==
Research marketplaces make it possible for scientists to use contract research organizations (CROs) to outsource an entire pharmaceutical drug discovery project without requiring physical access to a laboratory.

In 2011 and 2012, Assay Depot (as they were called at the time) launched outsourcing marketplaces for the large pharmaceutical companies Pfizer and AstraZeneca. The marketplace was featured in a 2012 TEDMED talk given by then-Stanford University professor Atul Butte, who demonstrated how the Assay Depot platform could be used to find animals to run an experiment on as easily as online shopping. A journalist describing the talk described the company as "Amazon.com for medical research".

In 2017, Scientist.com rolled out a series of new marketplace features to attract more customers, including COMPLi®, a comprehensive process that oversees the sourcing of regulated services for scientific research, such as the legal and ethical acquisition of biological specimens, animal welfare, toxicology studies, secondary real world evidence (RWE), health economics and outcomes research (HEOR), and GxP services. By the end of 2017, the company operated private marketplaces for most of the world's major pharmaceutical companies and entered into a collaboration with VWR International to create an end-to-end research solution.

In 2018, Scientist.com launched DataSmart, a platform to ensure data integrity; DataSmart is based on proprietary blockchain technology developed by Scientist.com. The company also opened an office in Tokyo, Japan in 2018 in order to work more closely with Japanese pharma companies. In 2019, Scientist.com unveiled its first original service offering, Trial Insights, a digital reporting platform that aggregates publicly available clinical trials data into usable online dashboards. Later in 2019, Scientist.com launched SciPay, an early-payment program for the thousands of registered suppliers on its marketplace. In late 2020, Scientist.com acquired HealthEconomics.Com, the world's leading ConnectedCommunity in the Value, Evidence and Access space. Then, in 2021, Scientist.com completed three additional acquisitions, one of which was InsideScientific, an online environment that facilitates the exchange of scientific information via webinars, podcasts, and more. Next, was Notch8, which provides software and app development services, and have since rebranded as Scientist.com Software Solutions.

In 2025, Scientist.com was acquired by GHO Capital Partners LLP, a specialist private equity investor in global healthcare.

== Awards ==
2023

- Top 100 Healthcare Technology Companies - The Healthcare Technology Report

2024

- One of many Sourcing Industry Awards (Innovations in Supplier Diversity) awarded by the Sourcing Industry Group
- Ranked 14th in "Top 25 Biotech Companies" - The Healthcare Technology Report

2025

- Ranked 38th in "Top 50 Healthcare Technology Companies" by The Healthcare Technology Report

== Investors ==
The company raised $1.8M in October 2007 from family and friends. In June 2011, the company raised $1.7M from Hollywood producer Jack Giarraputo and friends. In March 2014, the company raised $3.4M in financing led by Jean Balgrosky of Bootstrap Ventures. In May 2017, the company raised $24M in an equity financing co-led by Boston-based Leerink Transformation Partners (LTP) and San Francisco and Boston-based 5AM Ventures; new investors included Heritage Provider Network, and existing investors Bootstrap Ventures and Jack Giarraputo also participated. In 2025, Scientist.com was acquired by GHO Capital Partners LLP, a specialist private equity investor in global healthcare.
