= Kevin Lustig =

American scientist (born 1963)

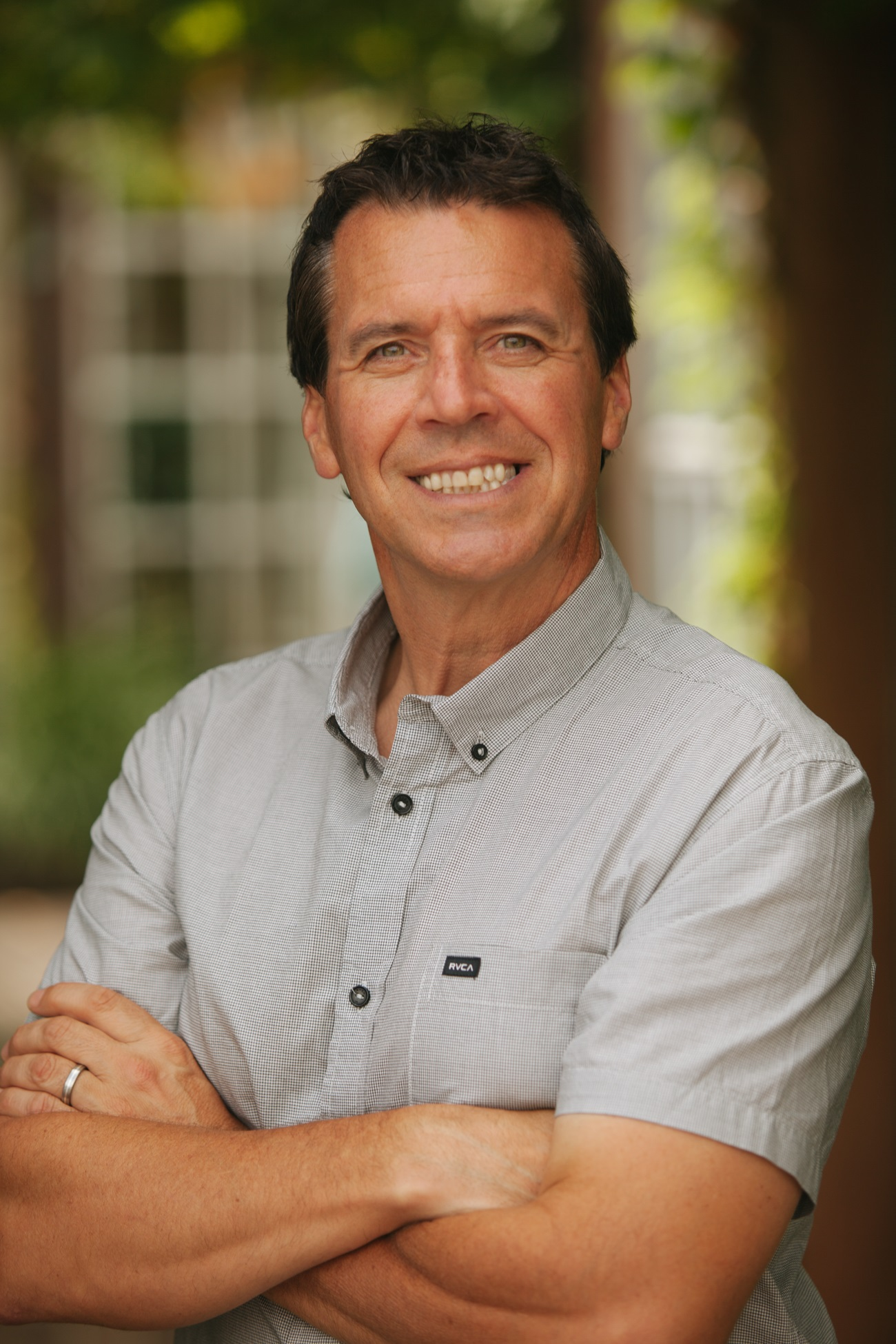
- Born: August 23, 1963 (age 63); Jamaica, New York, U.S.
- Education: University of California, San Francisco; University of Missouri; Cornell University
- Known for: Drug discovery, High-throughput screening (HTS), Founder and CEO of Scientist.com
- Scientific career
- Workplaces: Harvard Medical School
- Thesis: Functional Analyses of Vertebrate Signaling Pathways
- Doctoral advisor: Marc Kirschner

Kevin Donald Lustig (born 23 August 1963) is an American scientist and entrepreneur and founder of three life science companies: the pharmaceutical company Kalypsys in 2001; the online research marketplace Scientist.com (formerly Assay Depot) in 2007; and the non-profit lab incubator Bio, Tech and Beyond in 2013.

== Education ==
Kevin attended Canaan Elementary, Saxton Middle School, and graduated within the top ten in his class at Pelham Memorial High School. Lustig received an A.B. degree, magna cum laude, from the Section of Biochemistry, Molecular and Cell Biology from Cornell University in 1985. He received an M.S. degree in Biochemistry from the University of Missouri in 1991 and a PhD degree from Marc Kirschner’s laboratory in the Department of Biochemistry and Biophysics at the University of California, San Francisco in 1997. Lustig carried out postdoctoral research in the Department of Cell Biology at Harvard Medical School in 1997.

== Scientific contributions ==
Lustig has published 25 original research articles, 4 book chapters and holds 8 patents.

In 1993, Lustig and Andrew Shiau cloned the first member of a novel class of Purinergic receptors activated by extracellular adenosine triphosphate (ATP), a gene family that includes important drug targets.

In 1993, Lustig and Bruce Conklin invented the first of a series of G-protein chimeras that are still widely used by the pharmaceutical and biotechnology industry for drug screening.

In 1996, Lustig and Marc Kirschner invented a paracrine signaling assay and used it to identify Xnr1, which is part of a cell signaling pathway generating left-right asymmetry.

In 1997, Lustig and Randy King invented an in vitro expression cloning technology used to isolate substrates of kinases and proteases.

In 1997, Lustig invented a functional genomics approach to gene discovery and used it to identify a new member of the T-box family of transcription factors (Xombi aka VegT).

In 1999 and 2000, Lustig and colleagues showed that bile acids are physiological ligands for the farnesoid X receptor (FXR), invented synthetic liver X receptor (LXR) agonists, and demonstrated that both FXR and LXR ligands regulate cholesterol transport.

== Entrepreneurial career ==
Lustig served as a research director at the biotechnology company Tularik, Inc. from 1997 to 2001, before it being acquired by Amgen in 2004. Tularik went public in December 1999 and is credited with helping to start the biotechnology stock bubble of 2000.

Lustig, Randy King, Pratik Shah and Peter Schultz founded the pharmaceutical company Kalypsys, Inc. in 2001. The company was a pioneer in using high throughput screening (HTS) for phenotypic drug screens. The company raised over $170M in venture capital funding. The HTS part of the business was sold to Wako Chemicals USA in 2010.

In 2007, Lustig, Chris Petersen, and Andrew Martin founded the research marketplace Assay Depot (later Scientist.com). The company launched its first public marketplace in September 2008. In 2011 and 2012, Scientist.com launched outsourcing marketplaces for the large pharmaceutical companies Pfizer and AstraZeneca, respectively. By 2020, the company operated private marketplaces for most of the world's major pharmaceutical companies and US National Institutes of Health (NIH). In late 2020, Scientist.com acquired HealthEconomics.Com, the world's leading ConnectedCommunity in the Value, Evidence and Access space. Then, in 2021, Scientist.com completed three additional acquisitions, one of which was InsideScientific, an online environment that facilitates the exchange of scientific information via webinars, podcasts, and more. Next, was Notch8, which provides software and app development services, and have since rebranded as Scientist.com Software Solutions. Lastly, is BioPharmCatalyst, an online resource for stock market investors of publicly traded biotechnology and pharmaceutical companies listed on U.S. markets NASDAQ and New York Stock Exchange (NYSE).

Lustig and Joseph Jackson founded Bio, Tech and Beyond (BTNB), a non-profit life science incubator in Carlsbad, California in 2013; BTNB is a fully equipped shared research facility that makes it possible for one or a few scientists to start a life science company without significant funding.

== Recognition ==
In 2013, Lustig was named “San Diego’s Most Admired CEO” by the San Diego Business Journal. That same year he was also one of five national finalists for Entrepreneur magazine's Emerging Entrepreneur of the Year Award. Lustig was twice recognized as one of the life science industry's “100 Most Inspiring People” by PharmaVoice magazine in 2012 and 2013. The company also won the San Diego Business Journal’s 2014 Innovation Award. In 2015, 2018, and 2019, the company was named one of Entrepreneur magazine's Best Entrepreneurial Companies in America. From 2017 to 2019, Scientist.com ranked number 155, 9, and 289, respectively on Inc. magazine's list of the 500 Fastest-Growing privately owned companies in America. Scientist.com made Inc. magazine's list of Best Workplaces of 2018 and 2019. Scientist.com was ranked as the 2nd Fastest-Growing Private Company in 2018 and the 10th Fastest-Growing Private Company in 2019 by the San Diego Business Journal, and in 2020 it named Lustig as one of San Diego's Most Influential People. In 2023, Scientist.com was named as America's 11th Most Innovative Company by Fortune.
