= Roxana Rose Daneshjou =

Researcher

Roxana Rose Daneshjou is an medical doctor, assistant professor at Stanford University, and venture capitalist working at the intersection of artificial intelligence and healthcare. She is also associated with research examining behavioral tendencies in large language models, including work related to sycophantic responses in AI systems.

== Early life and education ==
She was born in Lewisville, Texas to immigrants from Iran. She attended high school at the Texas Academy of Mathematics and Science and then went on to Rice University where she received a B.S. in Bioengineering. She completed her MD/PhD at Stanford School of Medicine with Russ Altman and Carlos Bustamante as her thesis advisors. She went on to complete residency in Dermatology at Stanford and a postdoc in Artificial Intelligence with James Zou.

== Career ==
Daneshjou is an assistant professor at Stanford University, where she works within an interdisciplinary environment spanning medicine, data science, and biomedical informatics. Her work often examines how diagnostic algorithms may behave differently depending on skin tone or demographic representation in training datasets. Her lab put out one of the early papers showing that large language models had racial biases when asked medical questions. These investigations have placed her research within wider academic and policy discussions about equity in AI-driven healthcare.

Beyond her academic research, Daneshjou is active in translational and entrepreneurial efforts aimed at bringing AI tools into healthcare practice. She is involved with AI Health Fund (AIHF), a venture initiative that supports early-stage healthcare companies developing artificial intelligence technologies.

She is also a founder of Treehub, AIHF's residency program designed to fund, support, and mentor founders working at the intersection of artificial intelligence and healthcare innovation. The initiative emphasizes early-stage development, interdisciplinary collaboration, and practical deployment of AI systems in medical contexts. In addition, she serves in an advisory role on the Health and Biotech Advisory Boards of Pear VC, contributing expertise on healthcare technologies and AI product development strategy.

Daneshjou has participated in academic and industry-facing discussions on the ethical and regulatory implications of artificial intelligence in healthcare. Her work engages with questions around model transparency, clinical accountability, and the risks associated with deploying large-scale machine learning systems in high-stakes medical environments. She is frequently involved in interdisciplinary collaborations that include clinicians, engineers, and researchers working on AI safety and healthcare innovation.
