= Soumya Raychaudhuri =

Medical researcher (born 1975)

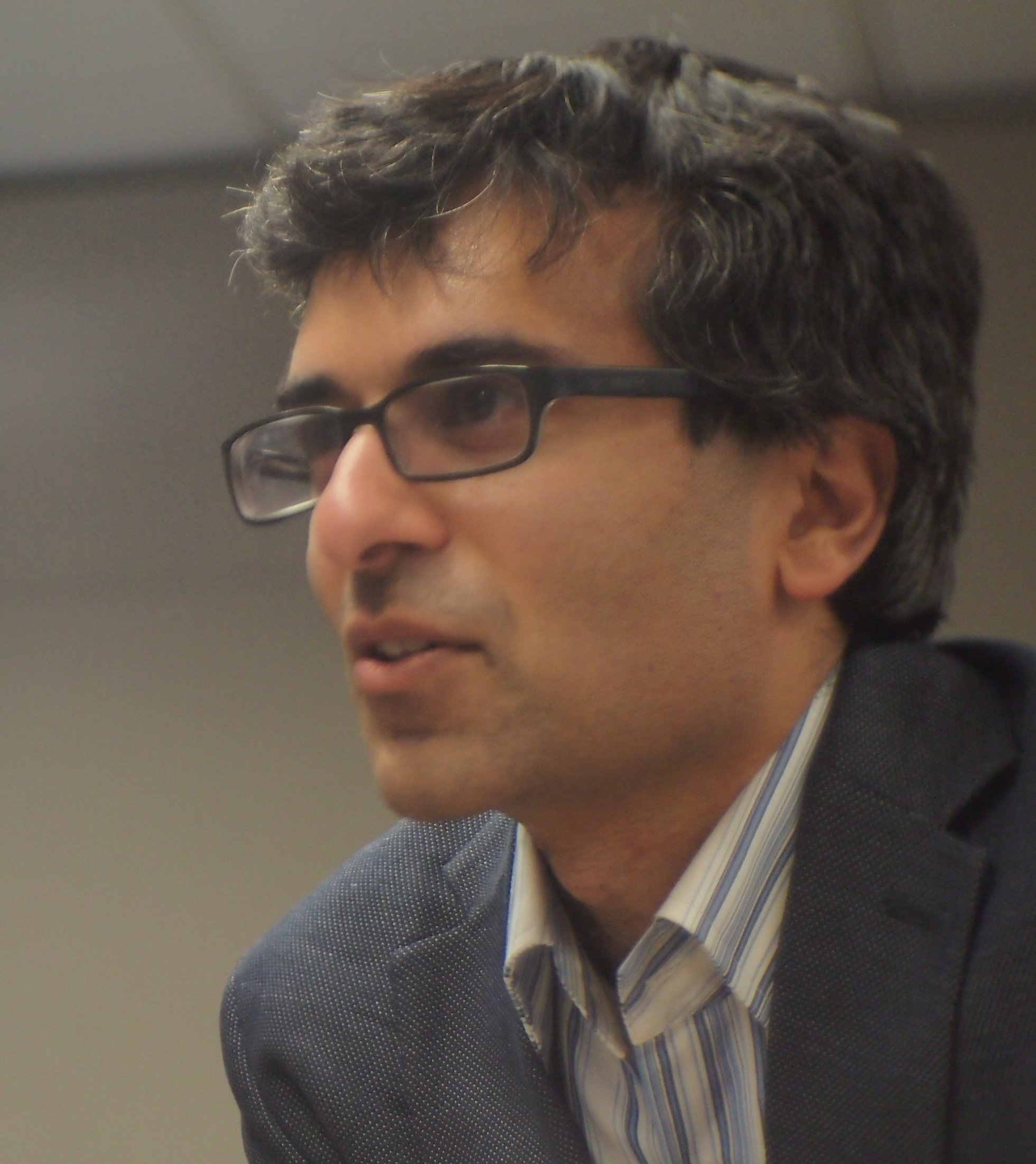
- Born: October 10, 1975 (age 50)
- Education: Stanford University School of Medicine
- Scientific career
- Fields: Computational biology genetics immunology
- Workplaces: Harvard Medical School; Brigham and Women's Hospital; Broad Institute
- Thesis: Using text to enhance the interpretation of large multi-dimensional data sets (2002)
- Doctoral advisor: Russ Altman
- Other academic advisors: Mark Daly
- Website: raychaudhurilab.broadinstitute.org

Soumya Raychaudhuri is a Timothy P. and Keli B. Walbert Professor of Medicine and Biomedical informatics at Harvard Medical School, and an Institute Member at Broad Institute. He is the director for the Center for Data Sciences at Brigham and Women's Hospital, where he is a clinically active rheumatologist. His research focuses on human genetics and computational genomics to understand immune-mediated diseases.

== Education and career ==
Raychaudhuri completed his undergraduate degrees in biophysics and mathematics from State University of New York at Buffalo in 1997. He went on to join the Stanford University Medical School where he completed his M.D. and Ph.D. degrees. He pursued clinical training in internal medicine, followed by subspecialty training in rheumatology at BWH. He concurrently completed postdoctoral training in human genetics at the Broad Institute with Mark Daly. In 2010, he launched his laboratory and joined the faculty at Harvard Medical School. He was promoted to Professor in 2018.

== Research ==
His lab at Harvard uses human genetics, functional genomics and bioinformatics techniques to study immune mediated diseases, such as rheumatoid arthritis. His lab has also been active in investigating the genetic basis of other diseases including and tuberculosis, age related macular degeneration and type I diabetes. His contributions to computational biology include standard methods in the analysis of transcriptome data, methods to interpret biological data with statistical text mining, and integrative methods to jointly analyze multiple functional genomic modalities together. He has developed methods to map complex trait loci, most notable within the HLA locus. He has also contributed to understanding how complex trait alleles influence gene regulation, particularly in T cells.

== Publications ==
- Raychaudhuri S, Stuart JM, Altman RB. Principal components analysis to summarize microarray experiments: application to sporulation time series. Pac Symp Biocomput. 2000:455-66. doi: 10.1142/9789814447331_0043.
- Raychaudhuri S, Sandor C, Stahl EA, Freudenberg J, Lee HS, Jia X, Alfredsson L, Padyukov L, Klareskog L, Worthington J, Siminovitch KA, Bae SC, Plenge RM, Gregersen PK, de Bakker PI. Five amino acids in three HLA proteins explain most of the association between MHC and seropositive rheumatoid arthritis. Nat Genet. 2012 Jan 29;44(3):291-6. doi: 10.1038/ng.1076.
- Trynka G, Sandor C, Han B, Xu H, Stranger BE, Liu XS, Raychaudhuri S. Chromatin marks identify critical cell types for fine mapping complex trait variants. Nat Genet. 2013 Feb;45(2):124-30. doi: 10.1038/ng.2504.
- Seddon JM, Yu Y, Miller EC, Reynolds R, Tan PL, Gowrisankar S, Goldstein JI, Triebwasser M, Anderson HE, Zerbib J, Kavanagh D, Souied E, Katsanis N, Daly MJ, Atkinson JP, Raychaudhuri S. Rare variants in CFI, C3 and C9 are associated with high risk of advanced age-related macular degeneration. Nat Genet. 2013 Nov;45(11):1366-70. doi: 10.1038/ng.2741.
- Hu X, Deutsch AJ, Lenz TL, Onengut-Gumuscu S, Han B, Chen WM, Howson JM, Todd JA, de Bakker PI, Rich SS, Raychaudhuri S. Additive and interaction effects at three amino acid positions in HLA-DQ and HLA-DR molecules drive type 1 diabetes risk. Nat Genet. 2015 Aug;47(8):898-905. doi: 10.1038/ng.3353.
- Zhang F, Wei K, Slowikowski K, Fonseka CY, Rao DA, Kelly S, Goodman SM, Tabechian D, Hughes LB, Salomon-Escoto K, Watts GFM, Jonsson AH, Rangel-Moreno J, Meednu N, Rozo C, Apruzzese W, Eisenhaure TM, Lieb DJ, Boyle DL, Mandelin AM 2nd; Accelerating Medicines Partnership Rheumatoid Arthritis and Systemic Lupus Erythematosus (AMP RA/SLE) Consortium; Boyce BF, DiCarlo E, Gravallese EM, Gregersen PK, Moreland L, Firestein GS, Hacohen N, Nusbaum C, Lederer JA, Perlman H, Pitzalis C, Filer A, Holers VM, Bykerk VP, Donlin LT, Anolik JH, Brenner MB, Raychaudhuri S. Defining inflammatory cell states in rheumatoid arthritis joint synovial tissues by integrating single-cell transcriptomics and mass cytometry. Nat Immunol. 2019 Jul;20(7):928-942. doi: 10.1038/s41590-019-0378-1.
- Korsunsky I, Millard N, Fan J, Slowikowski K, Zhang F, Wei K, Baglaenko Y, Brenner M, Loh PR, Raychaudhuri S. Fast, sensitive and accurate integration of single-cell data with Harmony. Nat Methods. 2019 Dec;16(12):1289-1296. doi: 10.1038/s41592-019-0619-0.
- Nathan A, Asgari S, Ishigaki K, Valencia C, Amariuta T, Luo Y, Beynor JI, Baglaenko Y, Suliman S, Price AL, Lecca L, Murray MB, Moody DB, Raychaudhuri S. Single-cell eQTL models reveal dynamic T cell state dependence of disease loci. Nature. 2022 Jun;606(7912):120-128. doi: 10.1038/s41586-022-04713-1.

== Awards & memberships ==
- Goldwater Scholar
- Doris Duke Award
- American College of Rheumatology Henry Kunkel Young Investigator Award
- Elected Member, American Society of Clinical Investigation
- Clarivate Highly Cited Researcher
- Fellow, American Association for the Advancement of Science
