= Marylyn D. Ritchie =

American geneticist

Marylyn D. Ritchie is a Professor of Genetics, the Director of the Center for Translational Bioinformatics, the Associate Director for Bioinformatics in the Institute for Biomedical Informatics, and the Associate Director of the Center for Precision Medicine, at the University of Pennsylvania's Perelman School of Medicine. She is also a founding co-director of the Penn Medicine BioBank.

== Career ==
Marylyn D. Ritchie has published many papers in peer-reviewed journals such as the American Journal of Human Genetics, the Journal of Biological Chemistry, Human Molecular Genetics, Bioinformatics, and PLOS Genetics. Previously, she was an associate professor at Vanderbilt University in the Department of Molecular Physiology and Biophysics and the Department of Biomedical Informatics. She has also served as a consultant for Boehringer-Ingelheim, one of the world's leading pharmaceutical companies.

In 2018 she was appointed to the Center for Translational Genomics and the Institute for Biomedical Informatics at the University of Pennsylvania.

She is the editor-in-chief of the BioData Mining journal since 2016.

== Research interests ==
Her main research interests are Bioinformatics, Computational Genomics, Pharmacogenomics and Genetic Architecture of Complex Human Traits.

== Awards and honors ==
- 2004 – Best Paper Award at the Genetic and Evolutionary Computation Conference
- 2006 – Rising Young Investigator Award from the journal Genome Technology
- 2010 – Alfred P. Sloan Foundation fellowship
- 2011, 2012 and 2013 – Selected as a fellow of The Kavli Foundation.
