= Regulatory science =

Regulatory science is the scientific and technical foundations upon which regulations are based in various industries – particularly those involving health or safety. Regulatory bodies employing such principles in the United States include, for example, the FDA for food and medical products, the EPA for the environment, and the OSHA for work safety.

"Regulatory science" is contrasted with regulatory affairs and regulatory law, which refer to the administrative or legal aspects of regulation, in that the former is focused on the regulations' scientific underpinnings and concerns – rather than the regulations' promulgation, implementation, compliance, or enforcement.

== History ==
Probably the first investigator who recognized the nature of regulatory science was Alvin Weinberg, who described the scientific process used to evaluate effects of ionizing radiation as trans science. The origin of the term regulatory science is unknown. It was probably coined sometimes in the late 1970s in an undated memorandum prepared by A. Alan Moghissi, who was describing scientific issues that the newly formed US Environmental Protection Agency (EPA) was facing. During that period the EPA was forced to meet legally mandated deadlines to make decisions that would require reliance upon science that was not meeting conventional scientific requirements. At that time the prevailing view was that there was no need to establish a new scientific discipline because "science is science" regardless of its application. In the spring of 1985, Moghissi established the Institute for Regulatory Science in the commonwealth of Virginia as a nonprofit organization with the objective to perform scientific studies "at the interface between science and the regulatory system". Moghissi et al. have provided an extensive description of history of regulatory science including various perception of regulatory science leading to the acceptance of regulatory science by the FDA.

== Definition ==
Two federal regulatory agencies have provided definitions for regulatory science. According to Food and Drug Administration: “Regulatory Science is the science of developing new tools, standards, and approaches to assess the safety, efficacy, quality, and performance of all FDA-regulated products”. According to Environmental Protection Agency (EPA): “Regulatory science means scientific information including assessments, models, criteria documents, and regulatory impact analyses that provide the basis for significant regulatory decisions”.

Moghissi et al. have described the history of regulatory science and define it as:

“Regulatory science consists of an applied version of various scientific disciplines used in the regulatory process”. Based on their definition the generalized FDA definition is: Regulatory science is the science of developing new tools, standards, and approaches derived from various scientific disciplines to assess the safety, efficacy, quality, and performance of all FDA-regulated products. Similarly, the generalized EPA definition is:

Regulatory science means scientific information including assessments, models, criteria documents, and regulatory impact analyses derived from various scientific disciplines that provide the basis for EPA final significant regulatory decisions.

There have been several attempts to define regulatory science. In many cases there are claims that there is a difference between regulatory science and “normal science”, “academic science”, “research science”. or compliance with regulations. The primary problem is the lack of appreciation that many branches of science are evolving and much of the evolving science includes inherent uncertainties.

== Application of regulatory science ==
Regulatory science is included in every regulation that includes science. The regulatory science community consists of three groups of regulatory scientists:

- Those who are involved in development of regulations. Typically this group is employed by regulatory agencies
- Those who must comply with regulations. Typically this group consists of employees or contractors of regulated community.
- Those segments of the scientific community who perform research and development in areas relevant to the relevant regulated community.

The third group is of particular significance as they consist of organizations and individuals who support the first two groups. Included in this group are members of numerous advisory panels, organizations that provide peer reviews, and members of peer review panels. An example of this group is the National Academies consisting of the National Academy of Science, National Academy of Engineering, Institute of Medicine, and National Research Council. The application of regulatory science occurs in three phases. During the first phase the regulators must meet a legislative or court- mandated deadline and promulgate regulations using their best judgment. The second phase provides opportunity to develop regulatory science tools. These include human health and ecological risk assessment procedures and post marketing evaluation method d processes for drugs ad medical devices. The third Standard Operating phase, used tools developed during the second phase to improve the initial decision. (Moghissi et al.)

== Regulatory engineering ==
Engineering is the development of new products and processes, hence regulatory engineering encompasses principally the development of products and processes to facilitate or better examine regulations or their scientific foundations. Another related segment of regulatory science deal with the application of engineering design or analysis to operations such as the safety of nuclear and other power plants, chemical production facilities, mining operations, and air transportation.

Sometimes the term "regulatory engineer(ing)" is misused to refer to essentially administrative or regulatory roles dealing with organizing or coordinating regulatory matters for an organization; however, "engineering" refers only to functional design of products and processes, and in many jurisdictions this definition is legally enforced (see Regulation and licensure in engineering).

== Areas of focus ==
=== Regulatory pharmaceutical medicine ===
Consistent with its mission, the Food and Drug Administration (FDA) suggests, “Regulatory science is the science of developing new tools, standards and approaches to assess the safety, efficacy, quality and performance of FDA-regulated products.” Based on several decades of experience regulatory science is logically defined as a distinct scientific discipline constituting the scientific foundation of regulatory, legislative, and judicial decisions. Much like many scientific disciplines that have evolved within the last several decades, regulatory science is both interdisciplinary and multidisciplinary and relies upon a large number of basic and applied scientific disciplines.

Regulatory science is an emerging area of interest within pharmaceutical medicine as the shaping and implementation of legislation and guidelines. One definition of “regulatory science” is the science of developing new tools, standards and approaches to evaluate the efficacy, safety, quality and performance of medical products in order to assess benefit-risk and facilitate a sound and transparent regulatory decision-making. It has been recognized as having a significant impact on the industry’s ability to bring new medicines and medical devices to patients in need. Regulatory science challenges current concepts of benefit/risk assessment, submission and approval strategies, patient’s involvement and ethical aspects. It creates the platform for launching new ideas – not only by the pharmaceutical industry and regulatory authorities, but also by, for example, academia, who wants to contribute to better use of their research activities within medical aspects. Regulatory science has the potential as an enabler for directing companies towards more efficient global development of medical products as well as more robust quality decision-making processes.

=== Human health ===
By far the predominant foci of regulatory science pertain to human health and well-being. This realm covers a broad range of scientific areas – including pollution and toxicology, work safety, food, drugs, and numerous others.

=== Ecology ===
Regulatory ecology covers the protection of various species, protection of wetlands, and numerous other regulated areas, including ecotoxicology.

For example, the US Clean Water Act is based upon an interest in protecting water quality for its own sake, in contrast with the Clean Air Act which is premised upon protecting air quality only for the sake of human health; however, these are ideological policy premises rather than scientific matters themselves.

The US Department of Agriculture regulates animal care, and the FDA regulates humaneness for animal studies.

The US Department of Interior, Fish and Wildlife Service (USFWS), and National Oceanographic and Atmospheric Administration, National Marine Fisheries Service, implement the development and enforcement of policies required by the Federal Endangered Species Act (FESA), Migratory Bird Treaty Act, and other biological resources laws. The FESA requires that the decisions to list a species as endangered or threatened are based on the best available scientific data. To that end, the USFWS and other government agencies fund research to determine the conservation status of proposed species. Regulatory scientists within the Services review, evaluate, and incorporate data from these studies of proposed species in their published regulations. Survey protocols for listed species are also developed from scientific studies of their target species. The purpose of the protocols is to reliably and accurately determine the residency of the target species in a given study area.

== Regulatory economics ==
There are numerous economic decisions in the regulatory process, including the economics part of cost-benefit analysis.

== Science in legislation and in courts ==
Although often less than fully recognized, the scientific foundation of legislative decisions is included in regulatory science and should be based on reliable science. Similarly, courts have recognized the need to rely upon information that meets scientific requirements.
