= Joel Dudley =

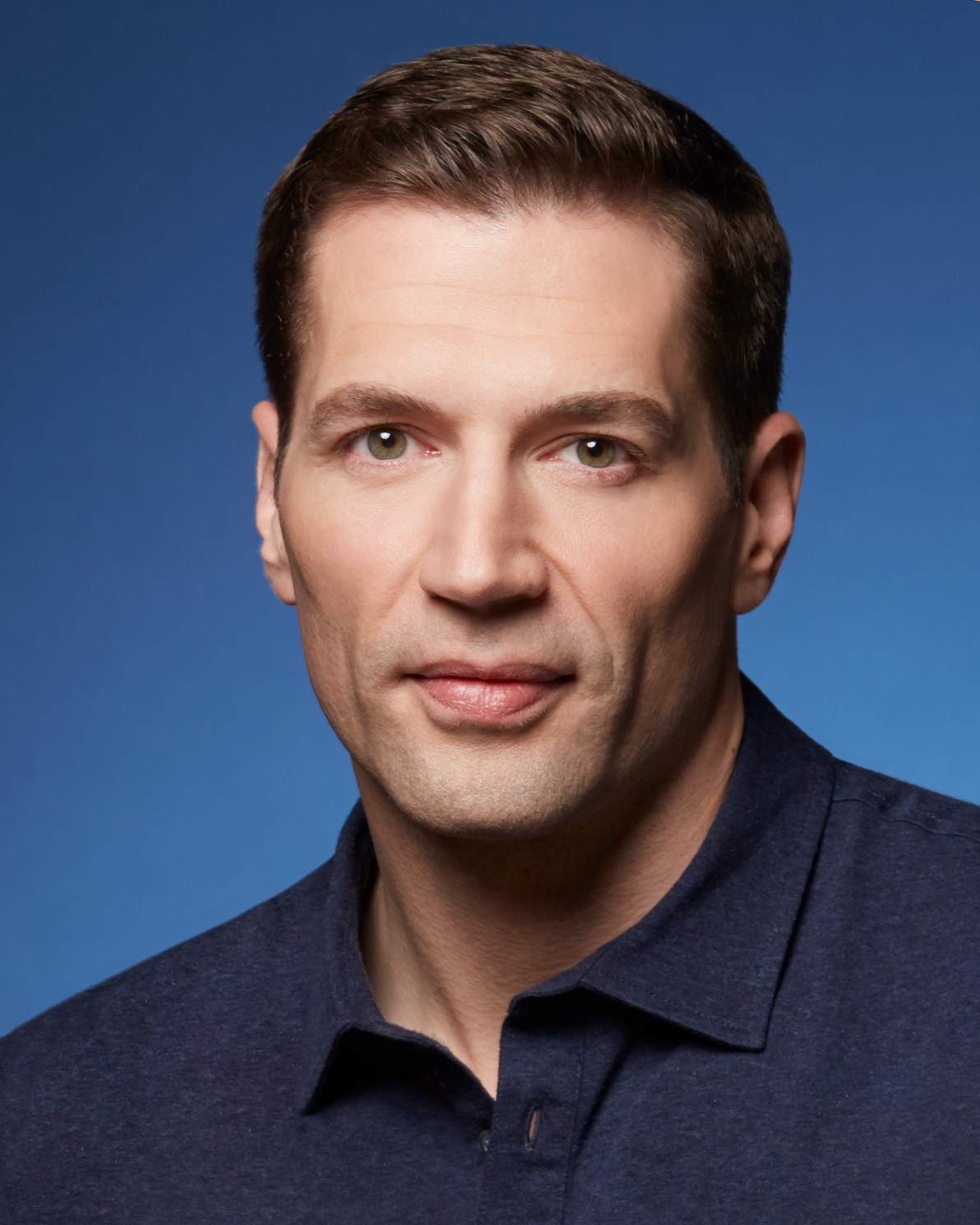
- Joel Dudley
- Education: Stanford University; Arizona State University
- Known for: Personalized medicine, Personal genomics
- Scientific career
- Fields: Bioinformatics, Health informatics, Personalized medicine, Genomics, Evolutionary Biology
- Workplaces: Icahn School of Medicine at Mount Sinai
- Doctoral advisor: Atul Butte

Joel Dudley is currently Associate Professor of Genetics and Genomic Sciences and founding Director of the Institute for Next Generation Healthcare at the Icahn School of Medicine at Mount Sinai. In March, 2018 Dr. Dudley was named Executive Vice President for Precision Health for the Mount Sinai Health System (MSHS). In 2017 he was awarded an Endowed Professorship by Mount Sinai in Biomedical Data Science. Prior to Mount Sinai, he held positions as Co-founder and Director of Informatics at NuMedii, Inc. and Consulting Professor of Systems Medicine in the Department of Pediatrics at Stanford University School of Medicine. His work is focused at the nexus of -omics, digital health, artificial intelligence (AI), scientific wellness, and healthcare delivery. His work has been featured in the Wall Street Journal, Scientific American, MIT Technology Review, CNBC, and other popular media outlets. He was named in 2014 as one of the 100 most creative people in business by Fast Company magazine. He is co-author of the book Exploring Personal Genomics from Oxford University Press. Dr. Dudley received a BS in Microbiology from Arizona State University and an MS and PhD in Biomedical Informatics from Stanford University School of Medicine.

== Selected publications ==
=== 2017 ===
- Hodos, R; Zhang, P; Lee, H. C; Duan, Q; Wang, Z; Clark, N. R; Ma'Ayan, A; Wang, F; Kidd, B; Hu, J; Sontag, D; Dudley, J (2018). "Cell-specific prediction and application of drug-induced gene expression profiles". Pacific Symposium on Biocomputing. Pacific Symposium on Biocomputing. 23: 32–43. PMC 5753597. PMID 29218867.
- Wang, Zichen; Li, Li; Glicksberg, Benjamin S; Israel, Ariel; Dudley, Joel T; Ma'Ayan, Avi (2017). "Predicting age by mining electronic medical records with deep learning characterizes differences between chronological and physiological age". Journal of Biomedical Informatics. 76: 59–68. doi:10.1016/j.jbi.2017.11.003. PMC 5716867. PMID 29113935.
- Scott, Stuart A; Owusu Obeng, Aniwaa; Botton, Mariana R; Yang, Yao; Scott, Erick R; Ellis, Stephen B; Wallsten, Richard; Kaszemacher, Tom; Zhou, Xiang; Chen, Rong; Nicoletti, Paola; Naik, Hetanshi; Kenny, Eimear E; Vega, Aida; Waite, Eva; Diaz, George A; Dudley, Joel; Halperin, Jonathan L; Edelmann, Lisa; Kasarskis, Andrew; Hulot, Jean-Sébastien; Peter, Inga; Bottinger, Erwin P; Hirschhorn, Kurt; Sklar, Pamela; Cho, Judy H; Desnick, Robert J; Schadt, Eric E (2017). "Institutional profile: Translational pharmacogenomics at the Icahn School of Medicine at Mount Sinai". Pharmacogenomics. 18 (15): 1381–1386. doi:10.2217/pgs-2017-0137. PMC 5694020. PMID 28982267.

=== 2016 ===
- Kini, Annapoorna S; Vengrenyuk, Yuliya; Shameer, Khader; Maehara, Akiko; Purushothaman, Meerarani; Yoshimura, Takahiro; Matsumura, Mitsuaki; Aquino, Melissa; Haider, Nezam; Johnson, Kipp W; Readhead, Ben; Kidd, Brian A; Feig, Jonathan E; Krishnan, Prakash; Sweeny, Joseph; Milind, Mahajan; Moreno, Pedro; Mehran, Roxana; Kovacic, Jason C; Baber, Usman; Dudley, Joel T; Narula, Jagat; Sharma, Samin (2017). "Intracoronary Imaging, Cholesterol Efflux, and Transcriptomes After Intensive Statin Treatment". Journal of the American College of Cardiology. 69 (6): 628–640. doi:10.1016/j.jacc.2016.10.029. PMID 27989886.
- Shameer, Khader; Johnson, Kipp W; Yahi, Alexandre; Miotto, Riccardo; Li, LI; Ricks, Doran; Jebakaran, Jebakumar; Kovatch, Patricia; Sengupta, Partho P; Gelijns, Sengupta; Moskovitz, Alan; Darrow, Bruce; David, David L; Kasarskis, Andrew; Tatonetti, Nicholas P; Pinney, Sean; Dudley, Joel T (2017). "Predictive modeling of hospital readmission rates using electronic medical record-wide machine learning: a case-study using Mount Sinai Heart Failure Cohort". Biocomputing 2017. Pacific Symposium on Biocomputing. Pacific Symposium on Biocomputing. Vol. 22. pp. 276–287. doi:10.1142/9789813207813_0027. ISBN 978-981-320-780-6. PMC 5362124. PMID 27896982.
- Karim, Sajjad; Noureldin, Hend Fakhri; Abusamra, Heba; Salem, Nada; Alhathli, Elham; Dudley, Joel; Sanderford, Max; Scheinfeldt, Laura B; Kumar, Sudhir (2016). "E-GRASP: An integrated evolutionary and GRASP resource for exploring disease associations". BMC Genomics. 17 (Suppl 9): 770. doi:10.1186/s12864-016-3088-1. PMC 5073857. PMID 27766955.

=== 2015 ===
- Readhead, B; Haure-Mirande, J-V; Zhang, B; Haroutunian, V; Gandy, S; Schadt, E E; Dudley, J T; Ehrlich, M E (2016). "Molecular systems evaluation of oligomerogenic APPE693Q and fibrillogenic APPKM670/671NL/PSEN1Δexon9 mouse models identifies shared features with human Alzheimer's brain molecular pathology". Molecular Psychiatry. 21 (8): 1153–4. doi:10.1038/mp.2015.215. PMC 6783804. PMID 26782051.
- Kidd, Brian A; Readhead, Ben P; Eden, Caroline; Parekh, Samir; Dudley, Joel T (2015). "Integrative network modeling approaches to personalized cancer medicine". Personalized Medicine. 12 (3): 245–257. doi:10.2217/pme.14.87. PMC 4806849. PMID 27019658.
- Brohl, A. S; Li, L; Andikyan, V; Obi An, S. G; Cioffi, A; Hao, K; Dudley, J. T; Ascher-Walsh, C; Kasarskis, A; Maki, R. G (2015). "Age-Stratified Risk of Unexpected Uterine Sarcoma Following Surgery for Presumed Benign Leiomyoma". The Oncologist. 20 (4): 433–9. doi:10.1634/theoncologist.2014-0361. PMC 4391766. PMID 25765878.

Google Scholar Citations

https://scholar.google.com/citations?user=206DEM0AAAAJ
