= Center of Excellence in Regulatory Science and Innovation =

Type of research centre focused on regulatory science to support innovation

A Center of Excellence in Regulatory Science and Innovation (CERSI) is a type of research centre focused on regulatory science to support innovation. They were invented by the Food and Drug Administration in the US in 2016 to support their work, with the creation of four CERSIs. The UK launched equivalent bodies (Centres of Excellence in Regulatory Science and Innovation) in 2025 to work with the Medicines and Healthcare products Regulatory Agency (MHRA).
