= BioData Mining =

Journal

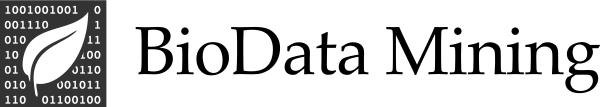
- Discipline: Data mining, bioinformatics, machine learning, computational biology
- Language: English
- Edited by: Jason H. Moore, Nicholas Tatonetti

Publication details
- History: 2008–present
- Publisher: BioMed Central
- Frequency: Continuous
- Open access: Yes
- License: Creative Commons Attribution 4.0
- Impact factor: 4.079 (2021)

Standard abbreviations
- ISO 4: BioData Min.

Indexing
- CODEN: BMIIAP
- ISSN: 1756-0381
- LCCN: 2009243015
- OCLC no.: 239727180

Links
- Journal homepage; Online archive

BioData Mining is a peer-reviewed open access scientific journal covering data mining methods applied to computational biology and medicine established in 2008. It is published by BioMed Central and the editors-in-chief are Jason H. Moore and Nicholas Tatonetti (Cedars Sinai Medical Center).

== Abstracting and indexing ==
The journal is abstracted and indexed in:

- Biological Abstracts
- BIOSIS Previews
- Chemical Abstracts Service
- EBSCO databases
- Embase
- Inspec
- ProQuest databases
- Science Citation Index Expanded
- Scopus

According to the Journal Citation Reports, the journal has a 2021 impact factor of 4.079.
