= Atul Butte =

American medical researcher (1969–2025)

Atul Janardhan Butte
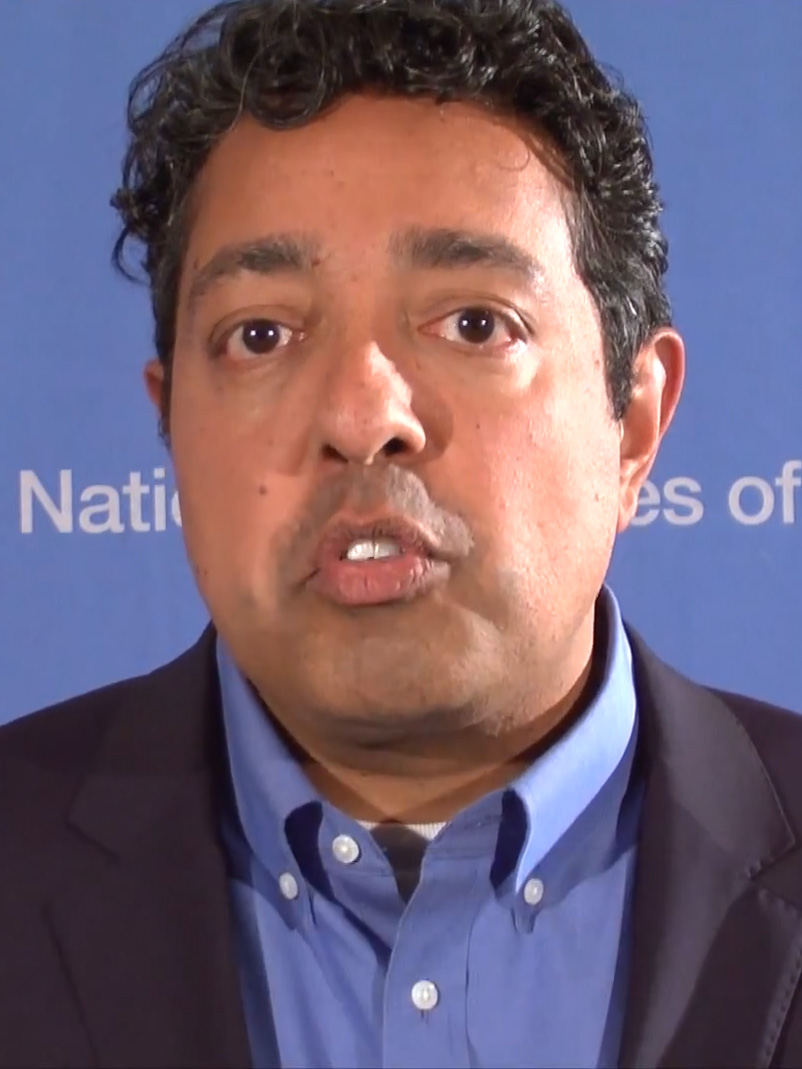
- Butte in 2015
- Born: August 26, 1969; Philadelphia, Pennsylvania, U.S.
- Died: June 13, 2025 (aged 55); California, U.S.
- Education: Brown University (BS, MS, MD); Massachusetts Institute of Technology (PhD)
- Awards: Fellow of the American College of Medical Informatics (2009); National Academy of Medicine (IOM, 2015)
- Scientific career
- Fields: Bioinformatics, health informatics, endocrinology, personalized medicine, genomics, big data, datamining
- Workplaces: Stanford University; UCSF
- Thesis: Exploring genomic medicine using integrative biology (2004)
- Doctoral advisor: Isaac Kohane
- Doctoral students: Joel Dudley

Atul Janardhan Butte (August 26, 1969 – June 13, 2025) was an American biomedical informatician, pediatrician and biotechnology entrepreneur. He was the Priscilla Chan and Mark Zuckerberg Distinguished Professor at the University of California, San Francisco. In 2015, Butte became the inaugural director of UCSF's Bakar Computational Health Sciences Institute.

== Early life and career ==
Butte was born in Philadelphia on August 26, 1969, to Janardhan Butte and Mangala Butte. He attended Brown University, where he studied computer science as an undergraduate student. As a member of the school's Program in Liberal Medical Education he was guaranteed acceptance to Brown's Alpert Medical School, where he obtained his MD in 1995.

Butte completed a residency in pediatrics and a fellowship in pediatric endocrinology, both at Children's Hospital Boston. In 2004, he completed a Ph.D. from the Harvard–MIT Division of Health Sciences and Technology, supervised by Isaac Kohane.

Butte moved to California and became an assistant professor at Stanford University in 2005. He later became the Chief of the Division of Systems Medicine at Stanford University School of Medicine and Lucile Packard Children's Hospital where he held the position of an associate professor of pediatrics and (by courtesy) computer science and immunology & rheumatology. He moved to the University of California, San Francisco in 2015.

In April 2012, Butte delivered a TEDMED talk describing his lab's development of techniques using massive amount of publicly available biomedical research data to make new discoveries without running a wet-lab and actually outsourcing experiments using assaydepot.com.

Butte had an h-index of over 110 and was recognized by Publons as a highly cited researcher with over 70,000 citations. He founded two biotechnology companies (Personalis and NuMedii) and wrote one of the first books on microarray analysis, Microarrays for an Integrative Genomics.

== Personal life and death ==
Butte lived with his wife, Gini Deshpande, a cancer biology and biotechnology entrepreneur, and daughter in Menlo Park, California. As of 2018, Deshpande was the chief executive officer of NuMedii, an artificial intelligence technology company. His brother Manish J. Butte is a pediatrician at University of California, Los Angeles.

Butte died in California on June 13, 2025, at the age of 55.

== Awards and honors ==
In 2013, Butte was recognized as an Open Science Champion of Change by the White House. In 2015, he was elected a member of the National Academy of Medicine. In 2021, Butte was elected as a Fellow of the International Society for Computational Biology. In 2022, he became a fellow of the American Association for the Advancement of Science. In 2024, he received the Award for Excellence in Molecular Diagnostics from the Association for Molecular Pathology and the Morris F. Collen Award of Excellence from the American College of Medical Informatics. In 2025, he was elected to the American Academy of Arts and Sciences.
