= Sarah Gertrude Banks =

American physician and suffragist (1839–1926)

Dr. Sarah Gertrude Banks
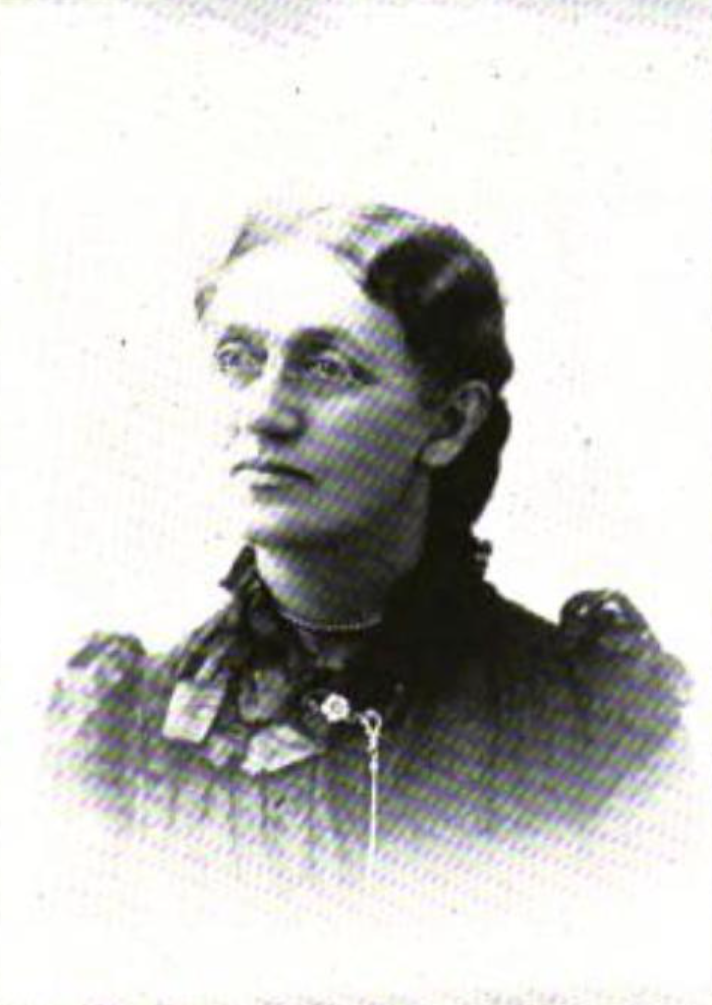
- Born: June 1839; Walled Lake, Michigan, United States
- Died: January 10, 1926 (aged 86)
- Education: University of Michigan Medicine (M.D.)
- Occupations: Physician; Suffragist; Teacher

Dr. Sarah A. Gertrude Banks (June 1839 – January 10, 1926) (Note: Her birthday on her death certificate was June 18, 1839, but one newspaper and her gravestone says she was born on June 11.) was an American physician and suffragist. She was the second woman physician to practice in Detroit, caring for the upper- and lower-class; one of her patients was Clara Bryant Ford. An avid suffragist and friends with Susan B. Anthony, she earned her M.D. from the University of Michigan Medical School in 1873, and also became the resident physician of the Women's Hospital and Foundling's Home (now Hutzel Women's Hospital) in Detroit. In addition, Banks co-founded its Free Dispensary for Women and Children, which provided free medical care and improved staff training. She promoted the first free children's playground with sufficient supervision in that same city, and was among the first women to graduate from her university.

== Life and career ==
It is only a few years since the idea of a woman entering the profession of medicine and graduating as a doctor was something so quixotic, if not actually absurd, that any girl who alluded to such a vocation was reasoned with and talked to as if she had contemplated moral suicide.

— Martha Louise Rayne, What Can a Woman Do, 1893

Banks' ancestry can be traced to Myles Standish (Note: Seventh generation) and William Bassett (d. 1667) on her mother's side, and Joseph Banks on her father's side. Sarah Gertrude Banks' parents, Amanda Bassett Banks and Freeborn Henry Banks, were one of Michigan's early pioneers and in 1833 built their home as part of the Underground Railroad. Her parents had six children.

Sarah Gertrude Banks was born in June 1839 in Walled Lake, Michigan, and lived beside a trail Native Americans commonly used. In her childhood, she worked as a farmer and attended her district's school. When she turned fifteen, she attended Seminary and State Normal School at Ypsilanti, which later became Eastern Michigan University. She became a teacher at Pleasant Lake when she was seventeen, and continued teaching at public schools in Ohio and Michigan until she was 25. She desired to get a profession which would promote the perception of women, and much to her friends' chagrin, began to study medicine in 1871.

Banks later joined the University of Michigan Medical School and eventually completed the two-year curriculum of three courses of lectures, facing sexism along the way. She earned her Doctor of Medicine degree in March of 1873, graduating along with Emma Louise Call, two years after the first woman graduate of the school Amanda Sanford. She became one of the earliest women graduates from the University of Michigan Medical School. (Note: There are conflicting sources on the claim that Banks was a graduate of a class of the University of Michigan's medical school that women were officially allowed in. Some sources say that she was a graduate of the first class, while others say she was a graduate of the second.) Banks then worked as a physician in Ypsilanti for seven months and then spent a year being the resident physician at the Women's Hospital and Foundling's Home (now Hutzel Women's Hospital) in Detroit. The president of the establishment said that her success in caring for patients "has rarely been equaled". She resigned early to accept another job in New Mexico, and then had an arduous journey traveling to there. After a couple months, she returned to her job at the Women's Hospital and Foundling's Home. She later continued her physician work in private and went on to care for indigent people and the upper-class; one of her patients was Clara Bryant Ford. At one point in time, Banks became a member of the Michigan Pioneer and Historical Society, the American Medical Association, and the Detroit Medical and Library Association of the Michigan State Medical Society. In 1922, the cookbook What to Eat and How to Prepare It by Elizabeth A. Monaghan was published with a preface written by Banks.

Banks died on January 10, 1926, due to pneumonia. She was buried in the Walled Lake Cemetery.

== Activism ==
Banks was an avid advocate for the women's suffrage movement, due in part to her being respected as part of the Daughters of the American Revolution and Mayflower Society and not being able to vote in spite of it. She also took part in national and community gatherings of women's voting rights organizations, and helped pay for the first gratis children's supervised playground in Detroit. In addition, she worked in organizations to help women get jobs and led in the Young Woman's Home Association, which she co-wrote the Nurse Directory of in 1886. Also, with Florence Hudson, Banks co-founded the all-women Free Dispensary for Women and Children at the Women's Hospital and Foundling's Home on March 1, 1893. It cared for people for free and helped to improve the staff.

Banks was also close friends with Susan B. Anthony and Anna Howard Shaw, and attended a celebration of the former's 85th birthday, in which Banks read a poem dedicated to her. In 1912, she advocated for a ballot proposal for letting women vote, which failed, although women's suffrage in Michigan would be established six years later.

== Legacy ==
Banks became known as the second woman physician to practice in Detroit, after Lucy M. Arnold. Banks has been described as "for nearly fifty years one of Detroit's most prominent women physicians" and "one of [Walled Lake's] most notable women".

The house the Banks family lived in was later known as the Banks-Dolbeer-Bradley-Foster farmhouse (or simply Foster farmhouse), named after the families who have historically lived in it. In 1997, there were plans to demolish the building in order to create a commercial establishment in its place, which was protested by the Walled Lake City Council. It was moved from 999 Pontiac Trail, Walled Lake to 239 Common Street, Riley Park that same year to satisfy both parties. The farmhouse underwent renovation in 2021.

Walled Lake Consolidated Schools named one of their new middle schools built in honor of Banks in 1998 located in Wixom, Michigan.
