= Ming-Chih Kao =

Medical academic

- Citizenship: United States
- Education: University of California, Berkeley Harvard University
- Scientific career
- Fields: Anesthesiology, Pain Medicine, Physical Medicine & Rehabilitation
- Workplaces: Stanford University
- Website: drmingkao.com

Ming-Chih Kao is an Assistant Professor of Anesthesiology, Perioperative and Pain Medicine and Orthopedics at Stanford University School of Medicine. He currently serves as Clinic Chief of the Stanford Pain Management Center.

Kao is a member of the International Association of the Study of Pain (IASP), the American Association of Pain Medicine (AAPM), the North American Spine Society (NASS) and the International Spine Intervention Society (SIS).

== Education and training ==
Kao graduated from the University of California, Berkeley with degrees in molecular and cell biology and psychology in 1999. He received his Ph.D. in Biostatistics from Harvard University in 2005, where he developed methods for rigorous understanding of heritable diseases and genomic sequences. He received his M.D. from the University of Michigan Medical School in 2007. Kao completed his internship in internal medicine at Yale-New Haven Hospital in 2008 and his residency in physical medicine and rehabilitation at Stanford University School of Medicine in 2012. Most recently, he completed his fellowship in pain management at Stanford University School of Medicine in 2013. He is board certified in physical medicine and rehabilitation from the American Board of Physical Medicine and Rehab. He is also board certified in pain management. Dr. Kao is a Certified Interventional Pain Sonographer (CIPS) as well as a Fellow in Interventional Pain Practice (FIPP).

== Research ==
Kao is the author of over 30 scientific journal articles.
