= List of medical wikis =

This is a list of medical wikis, collaboratively-editable websites that focus on medical information. Many medical wikis are encyclopedias, with a separate article for each medical term. Some of these websites are editable by anyone, while others restrict editing access to professionals. The majority of them have content available only in English.

The largest and most popular general encyclopedia, Wikipedia, also hosts a significant amount of health and medical information.

== Open licensed ==
=== WikiDoc ===
WikiDoc
- Website type: Wiki
- Headquarters: Boston
- Owner: WikiDoc Foundation
- Creator: C. Michael Gibson
- Website: wikidoc.org
- Commercial: No
- Registration: Yes
- Launched: December 2005
- Content license: CC BY SA 3.0

WikiDoc (alternatively spelled Wiki Doc) is a medical wiki encyclopedia where contributors are not required to have credentials in a biomedical field. WikiDoc was started in December 2005 by C. Michael Gibson, of Harvard Medical School. The original content came from Gibson's chief residency notes, board review notes, and content from a variety of copyleft sources including The U.S. National Library of Medicine, the U.S. Centers for Disease Control, Wikipedia, and Ask Dr Wiki. WikiDoc is oriented more to medical professionals.

=== WikEM ===
WikEM
- Website type: Wiki
- Available in: English
- Headquarters: Los Angeles
- Owner: WikEM Foundation
- Creator: Ross Donaldson
- Website: www.WikEM.org
- Commercial: No
- Registration: No
- Launched: 2009
- Current status: October 2016: 3,176 content pages
- Content license: CC BY SA 4.0

WikEM is a wiki-based website and mobile application oriented towards emergency medicine clinicians. It started as a database created from notes and checklists of residents at the Harbor-UCLA emergency medicine residency program, but is now open to all clinical providers. WikEM was launched in 2009. Its mobile application is available for iOS and Android, and functions in an offline environment. It calls itself The Global Emergency Medicine Wiki.

== Closed licensed ==
=== HemOnc.org ===
HemOnc.org
- Website type: Professional medical reference wiki
- Available in: English
- Creators: Peter Yang, MD
- Website: hemonc.org
- Commercial: No
- Registration: Free; editing requires credentialing
- Launched: November 2011
- Current status: Active
- Content license: Unclear

HemOnc.org is a hematology/oncology wiki which was originally created by oncologists to provide information about chemotherapy regimens and hematology/oncology medications. Its contributors are practicing physicians and other medical professionals. Its current focus is to provide clinicians referenced information about chemotherapy regimens, medications used in hematology/oncology, and to allow medical professionals to share any useful references or medical information with each other to improve their clinical & academic practice.

HemOnc.org runs on MediaWiki software. Anyone may sign up for an account and suggest additional information to be added. Editing privileges are activated for account holders whose credentials are verified. The content is not under an open license.

Data about HemOnc.org has been presented at the 2013 ASCO Quality Care Symposium, and it was profiled in 2013 in the Oncology Times. The website's chemotherapy regimen database has also been used for academic research projects as of 2013.

== Defunct ==
=== AskDrWiki ===
AskDrWiki
- Website type: Expert medical wiki project
- Headquarters: Cleveland, Ohio
- Owner: Open Access Medical Informatics Group
- Creators: Kenny Civello, Brian Jefferson
- Website: www.askdrwiki.com
- Commercial: No
- Registration: Required with credentialing
- Launched: August 2006
- Current status: Website not functional. In November 2013, there were 2,111 pages and 1,408 content pages. In February 2015, there were still the same number of pages.

AskDrWiki was a medical wiki encyclopedia created by Cleveland Clinic Cardiology Fellows Kenny Civello and Brian Jefferson. The project was started as a response to the lack of free online medical information found in several community hospitals and was created to form a repository of cardiovascular information that could be readily accessed for reference. It was launched in August 2006. The site now holds medical review articles, clinical notes, pearls, and medical images. The wiki allows anyone with a medical background to contribute or edit medical articles, of which there are over 2,000 as of 2013.

The purpose of the site was to provide reliable and easily accessed health information for the medical community including physicians, nurses, and medical students. The information published on the site is not meant to supersede medical training but to serve as a repository of medical review articles to give medical professionals an online source where they can review medical topics. The website is similar to Wikipedia because it runs on MediaWiki software allowing users to add and edit articles, but differs in that all users must be credentialed based on their medical training before they are allowed to publish. Its goal is not to compete with Wikipedia regarding consumer health-related topics, but to serve as an expert medical wiki and provide a source of up-to-date medical information for healthcare providers.

In December 2006, AskDrWiki was referenced in a British Medical Journal article, "How Web 2.0 is Changing Medicine", as one of the early adopters of using video hosting sites such as YouTube and Google Video to host medical videos. It was also discussed in a 2007 Nature Medicine article on medical wikis. AskDrWiki has been featured in other media including The Plain Dealer, Medical Economics and The American Medical Association News.

As of February 2015, although still online, the wiki had minimal ongoing contributions, with only 3 edits in 2014. As of March 2022 the site was down.

=== Ganfyd ===
Ganfyd
- Website type: Wiki
- Available in: English
- Revenue: nil
- Website: ganfyd.org
- Commercial: No
- Registration: Required
- Launched: November 2005
- Current status: October 2019: Defunct

Ganfyd was a medical wiki community and encyclopedia, created in November 2005 by a group of doctors working in the United Kingdom. Only registered medical practitioners or persons working under their direction, and a small number of invited non-medical specialists, could edit Ganfyd articles. The intention was to make the material reliable enough for professional medical use. As of 2013 it has over 8000 content pages. As of May 2020 it is no longer active.

=== Medcyclopaedia ===
Medcyclopaedia, The Encyclopaedia of Medical Imaging, was a wiki encyclopedia of medical imaging used in radiology and radiography. As of December 2012, the site no longer exists.

The encyclopedia was the result of a collaboration of the Nycomed Amersham Intercontinental Continuing Education in Radiology Institute (NICER Institute), Sweden, Department of Radiology, Lund University, Sweden, and Amersham Health, Oslo, Norway. It was provided and copyrighted by the healthcare unit of General Electric corporation. Retrieval of images (other than thumbnails) required registration.

The website contained 3,600 pages before closing down.

=== Medpedia ===
Medpedia
- Website type: Wiki
- Available in: English
- Owners: Medpedia Inc., Ooga Labs
- Revenue: Lost money
- Website: Medpedia.com
- Commercial: Yes
- Registration: Required
- Launched: 17 February 2009
- Current status: Closed January 2013

Medpedia was a collaborative project launched on 17 February 2009. Its aim was to create an open access medical wiki encyclopedia in association with Harvard Medical School, Stanford School of Medicine, Berkeley School of Public Health, University of Michigan Medical School, the United Kingdom's National Health Service (NHS) as well as other contributors. Content was licensed under the Creative Commons Attribution-ShareAlike (CC-BY-SA) license and ran on modified MediaWiki software. Harvard Medical School did not have a role in, nor was it responsible for, the content that appeared in the “wiki” section of Medpedia.

Anyone with medical knowledge was welcome to become part of Medpedia's community. However, to qualify to edit or contribute to the main content, approved editors needed an M.D., D.O., or Ph.D. in a biomedical field. Others could contribute by writing in suggestions for changes to the site using the "Make a suggestion" link at the top of each page. An approved editor could review and potentially add submitted suggestions.

Medpedia was composed of three primary components:

1. A collaborative encyclopedia (also referred to as the "knowledge base")
2. A Network & Directory for health professionals and organizations
3. Communities of Interest where medical professionals and non-professionals come together to discuss topics of interest.

A 2012 literature review of 50 academic journal articles about the use of social media by clinicians remarked that Medpedia had "launched in 2009 with substantial institutional backing" but that the authors "did not find articles reporting success metrics" for it.

Around January 2013 the site abruptly closed. Medpedia's founder James Currier acknowledged that this was permanent in a blog post in July 2013.

== See also ==
- Health information on Wikipedia
- Health information on the Internet
