= Sarah Banks =

Sarah Banks may refer to:

- Sarah Gertrude Banks (1839–1926), American physician and suffragist
- Sarah Sophia Banks (1744–1818), English collector of antiquarian items and sister of the naturalist Joseph Banks
- Sarah Banks (Brookside), fictional character from the soap opera Brookside
