= Athey =

Athey is an English-language toponymic surname. Notable people with the surname include:

- Bill Athey (born 1957), English cricketer
- Brian D. Athey, American computational biologist
- Clay Athey (born 1960), American politician and jurist
- Edward L. Athey (1921–2010), sports coach and athletic director at Washington College.
- Ron Athey (born 1961), American performance artist
- Susan Athey (born 1970), American microeconomist
- Tyras S. Athey (1927–2010), American politician from Maryland
