= Edward Bove =

American pediatric cardiac surgeon

Edward Bove (born 1947) is an American pediatric cardiac surgeon. He is a professor emeritus of cardiac surgery and a professor emeritus of pediatrics at the University of Michigan Medical School. He has worked in the University of Michigan Health System most of his career.

== Life and career ==
Bove was raised in New York City. He earned his undergraduate degree at the College of the Holy Cross, earned his medical degree from Albany Medical College in 1972, and went to University of Michigan for his residency. He completed that in 1980, then after a sojourn at Great Ormond Street Hospital as a fellow, spent five years as a surgeon at State University of New York in Syracuse before being recruited back to Michigan in 1985 to become head of the pediatric cardiac surgery division.

According to the University of Michigan, he pioneered a surgical approach to treating hypoplastic left heart syndrome, a birth defect that was always fatal; his approach was controversial at first but since then has become widely adopted.

In 2006 Bove, who was a director of the American Board of Thoracic Surgery, was appointed by the board to chair a committee to develop written and oral examinations and application process for a new certificate program in congenital heart surgery.

By 2012 he had performed 10,000 heart surgeries at Michigan mostly on babies, and that year he was also appointed chair of a newly created department of cardiac surgery at Michigan.
