= Julie Lumeng =

American developmental and behavioural paediatrician

Academic background
- Education: BA, English Language and Literature, 1993; MD, 1997, University of Michigan

Julie Carroll Lumeng is an American developmental and behavioural paediatrician. She became the inaugural Thomas P. Borders Family Research Professor of Child Behavior and Development at the University of Michigan in October 2019 and associate dean for research at Michigan Medicine.

== Early life and education ==
Lumeng received her medical degree from the University of Michigan Medical School, where she also completed her pediatric residency, before enrolling at the Boston University School of Medicine for her fellowship.

== Career ==
Upon completing her fellowship, Lumeng returned to her alma mater as a faculty member in 2003. During her tenure at UMich, Lumeng researched childhood obesity including its causes and treatment. In 2007, she found evidence that children who lacked sleep in third grade increased their chances of being obese in sixth grade by 40 per cent. Lumeng followed this study by showing childhood stress is another factor in childhood obesity using data from the Eunice Kennedy Shriver National Institute of Child Health and Human Development Study of Early Child Care and Youth Development. Her research team studied mothers of 848 children and divided their children into four categories of negative life events: health problems in the family; work, school or financial stability; emotional aspects of family relationships; and family structure, routine and caregiving.

As an associate professor of paediatrics, Lumeng led a study suggesting that children participating in Head Start was an effective strategy for combating obesity. Alongside her research team, she found that preschool-aged children who entered Head Start at an unhealthy weight became significantly healthier by kindergarten age than children in comparison groups. She was also the co-recipient of the Clinical and Health Services Research Award with Albert P. Rocchini and Sanjay Saint. In 2016, Lumeng led the first study to track subsequent increases in BMI after a child becomes a big brother or sister. She examined 697 children across the United States to determine that gaining a younger sibling before first grade could lower a child's risk of becoming obese. One of the hypotheses for this change was due to parents changing their dietary habits or engaging in more active play. Following this study, Lumeng was appointed a professor of pediatrics and communicable diseases with tenure and a professor of nutritional sciences without tenure.

In recognition of her teaching achievements, Lumeng was honored with the 2017 Distinguished Clinical and Translational Research Mentor Award that "recognizes faculty who foster the intellectual, creative, scholarly, and professional growth of their students, fellows, and trainees in the areas of clinical and translational health and research." The following year, Lumeng was named the director of the University of Michigan Center for Human Growth and Development where she planned to provide services to help researchers "analyze statistical data, recruit participants for research studies and code videos of child behavior."

In October 2019, Lumeng became the inaugural Thomas P. Borders Family Research Professor of Child Behavior and Development. During the COVID-19 pandemic in North America, Lumeng was appointed associate dean for research and the executive director for the Michigan Institute for Clinical and Health Research. She was also named assistant vice president for research at the University of Michigan to lead clinical and human research.
