= James T. Elder =

American dermatologist

James T. Elder is an American dermatologist and physician–scientist specializing in molecular genetic dermatology. He is the Kirk D. Wuepper Professor of Molecular Genetic Dermatology and a professor of dermatology at the University of Michigan Medical School. His research focused on the genetic and immunologic mechanisms of inflammatory skin disease. He is a fellow of American Academy of Dermatology, a member of the American Dermatological Association and the Society for Investigative Dermatology, and an Editor for the Journal of Investigative Dermatology.

== Education and career ==
Elder earned his B.S. in Biomedical Engineering with highest distinction from Northwestern University, followed by an M.D. through the Medical Scientist Training Program and a Ph.D. in Molecular Biophysics and Biochemistry from Yale University. He completed an internal medicine internship, dermatology residency, and research fellowship at the University of Washington, and subsequently undertook a Senior Research Fellowship at the University of Michigan.

Since joining the University of Michigan faculty in 1988, Elder has held appointments in dermatology and radiation oncology and was named Kirk D. Wuepper Professor in 2008. He has also served as a physician within the Veterans Administration health system.

== Research ==
Elder’s research centers on the molecular genetics of psoriasis, psoriatic arthritis, and other inflammatory skin disorders. His laboratory has been applying genetic linkage, association studies, and genome-wide association studies (GWAS) to identify disease susceptibility loci. In 2006, his group identified HLA-C*0602 as the disease allele at PSORS1, the major psoriasis susceptibility locus within the major histocompatibility complex (MHC).

More recently, Elder co-led large international GWAS meta-analyses involving hundreds of thousands of cases and controls, identifying over 100 psoriasis susceptibility loci, including dozens not previously reported.

Elder led a genome-wide study that identified four new DNA regions linked to susceptibility to psoriasis, an autoimmune skin disorder. He collaborated with Gonçalo Abecasis and researchers from the University of Utah and Washington University in St. Louis to advance understanding of psoriasis genetics.

In parallel, Elder’s laboratory has conducted functional genomics research, integrating ATAC-seq, RNA-seq, and immune cell profiling to define how genetic risk variants influence T-cell activation, skin homing, and immune memory in psoriasis. Additional long-standing research interests include the role of the epidermal growth factor receptor (EGFR/ErbB1) in wound healing, carcinogenesis, and inflammatory skin disease, as well as the identification of somatic mutations in melanocytic nevi and melanoma.

== Selected Publications ==
- Duncan, C; Biro, P A; Choudary, P V; Elder, J T; Wang, R R; Forget, B G; de Riel, J K; Weissman, S M (1979). "RNA polymerase III transcriptional units are interspersed among human non-alpha-globin genes". Proceedings of the National Academy of Sciences. 76 (10): 5095–5099. doi:10.1073/pnas.76.10.5095. ISSN 0027-8424. PMC 413086.
- Spritz, R A; Jagadeeswaran, P; Choudary, P V; Biro, P A; Elder, J T; deRiel, J K; Manley, J L; Gefter, M L; Forget, B G; Weissman, S M (1981). "Base substitution in an intervening sequence of a beta+-thalassemic human globin gene". Proceedings of the National Academy of Sciences. 78 (4): 2455–2459. doi:10.1073/pnas.78.4.2455. ISSN 0027-8424. PMC 319365.
- Elder, J.T.; Pan, J.; Duncan, C.H.; Weissman, S.M. (1981). "Transcriptional analysis of interspersed repetitive polymerase III transcription units in human DNA". Nucleic Acids Research. 9 (5): 1171–1189. doi:10.1093/nar/9.5.1171. ISSN 0305-1048. PMC 326744.
- Forrester, W C; Thompson, C; Elder, J T; Groudine, M (1986). "A developmentally stable chromatin structure in the human beta-globin gene cluster". Proceedings of the National Academy of Sciences. 83 (5): 1359–1363. doi:10.1073/pnas.83.5.1359. ISSN 0027-8424. PMC 323075.
- Gupta, Aditya K.; Fisher, Gary J.; Elder, James T.; Nickoloff, Brian J.; Voorhees, John J. (November 1988). "Sphingosine Inhibits Phorbol Ester-Induced Inflammation, Ornithine Decarboxylase Activity, and Activation of Protein Kinase C in Mouse Skin". Journal of Investigative Dermatology. 91 (5): 486–491. doi:10.1111/1523-1747.ep12476635. ISSN 0022-202X.
- Nair, Rajan P.; Stuart, Philip E.; Nistor, Ioana; Hiremagalore, Ravi; Chia, Nicholas V.C.; Jenisch, Stefan; Weichenthal, Michael; Abecasis, Gonçalo R.; Lim, Henry W.; Christophers, Enno; Voorhees, John J.; Elder, James T. (May 2006). "Sequence and Haplotype Analysis Supports HLA-C as the Psoriasis Susceptibility 1 Gene". The American Journal of Human Genetics. 78 (5): 827–851. doi:10.1086/503821. ISSN 0002-9297.
- Stuart, Philip E; Nair, Rajan P; Ellinghaus, Eva; Ding, Jun; Tejasvi, Trilokraj; Gudjonsson, Johann E; Li, Yun; Weidinger, Stephan; Eberlein, Bernadette; Gieger, Christian; Wichmann, H Erich; Kunz, Manfred; Ike, Robert; Krueger, Gerald G; Bowcock, Anne M (2010-10-17). "Genome-wide association analysis identifies three psoriasis susceptibility loci". Nature Genetics. 42 (11): 1000–1004. doi:10.1038/ng.693. ISSN 1061-4036. PMC 2965799.
- Tsoi, L.C.; Stuart, P.; Tian, C.; Gudjonsson, J.E.; al, E.; Hinds, D.; Nair, R.; Abecasis, G.; Elder, J. (May 2016). "358 Large scale meta-analysis characterizes genetic architecture for common psoriasis-associated variants". Journal of Investigative Dermatology. 136 (5): S64. doi:10.1016/j.jid.2016.02.391. ISSN 0022-202X.
- Dand, Nick; Stuart, Philip E.; Bowes, John; Ellinghaus, David; Nititham, Joanne; Saklatvala, Jake R.; Teder-Laving, Maris; Thomas, Laurent F.; Traks, Tanel; Uebe, Steffen; Assmann, Gunter; Baudry, David; Behrens, Frank; Billi, Allison C.; Brown, Matthew A. (2025-02-28). "GWAS meta-analysis of psoriasis identifies new susceptibility alleles impacting disease mechanisms and therapeutic targets". Nature Communications. 16 (1). doi:10.1038/s41467-025-56719-8. ISSN 2041-1723. PMC 11871359. PMID 40021644.
