= Tsang-gi Ni =

Chinese physiologist

Tsang-gi Ni (Chinese: 倪章祺; 1891–1965), also known as Fichen Ni (simplified Chinese: 倪维城; traditional Chinese: 倪維城), was a noted Chinese physiologist during the first fifty years of the 20th century.

== Early life ==
Ni was born on August 6, 1891, in Sonlin (双林), Zhejiang Province, China.

== Study in the U.S. ==
By 1919, Tsang-gi Ni had received his Master of Science and worked towards his doctorate degree with Professor Warren P. Lombard. He was also a member of the Cosmopolitan Club and Chinese Student Club. Tsang-gi Ni's graduate studies at the University of Michigan Medical School lasted until 1922, when he was awarded a degree of Doctor of Science. His doctoral dissertation, The Active Response of Capillaries of Frogs, Tadpoles, Fish, Bats and Men to Various Forms of Excitation, was published in the American Journal of Physiology that same year.

Following his graduation, Tsang-gi Ni was offered a fellowship at the Hsiang-Ya Medical College (湘雅医学院), but since he wanted more experiences in the U.S., he declined their offer. Instead, he focused on his post-doctoral study at the University of Minnesota in Minneapolis from 1922 until 1923 and then worked as a research fellow at Harvard Medical School until 1924.

== Return to China ==
When T.G. Ni returned to China in 1924, he started to work at the Peking Union Medical College (PUMC) alongside a pioneer of Chinese physiology, Robert Kho-seng Lim. Ni then became one of the founding members of the Chinese Physiological Society, which was established on February 27, 1926. He was also a member of the Chinese Medical Association, the Chinese Medico-Pharmaceutical Association (中华医药学会), and the Science Society of China.

From 1929 to 1930, Ni also took part in research, studies, and work at the University of Rochester in the United States, Plymouth University in England, and the University of Copenhagen in Denmark, where he worked with the Danish physiologist Poul Brandt Rehberg.

When he left PUMC in 1932, Ni went to the Henry Lester Institute of Medical Research in Shanghai (上海雷士德医学研究所). In December 1941, the Institute was occupied by the Japanese and was severely damaged that it could not recover from even after the Japanese army's surrender in 1945. After Communism settled over the land in 1949, it became known as the Shanghai Industrial Institute in 1954 and later changed to Shanghai Research Institute of Food Industries (上海食品工业科学研究所).

The Chinese Academy of Sciences published The Chinese Academy of Sciences 1949–1950 National Scientist Survey, which recommended 233 experts in thirteen groups – Ni was among 45 figures in the group of physiology, alongside R.K.S. Lim and Hsien Wu.

Tsang-gi Ni retired from the Shanghai Research Institute of Food Industries in 1958 and died on March 12, 1965.
