= Holger Pettersson =

Swedish radiologist and educator (1942–2010)

Holger Pettersson

Holger Pettersson (1942 – 3 November 2010) was a Swedish radiologist and educator. He was born in Ödsmål near Uddevalla, Sweden. He received his MD from University of Lund. In 1975, he finished his residency at Malmö General Hospital, Sweden and received his qualification as a specialist in diagnostic radiology. After three years, he got his specialization in pediatric radiology.

His research was on pediatric and skeletal radiology, focusing on hemophilia. He worked as the professor and chair of the department of radiology at the University Hospital in Lund for several years. He also worked as the director of the World Health Organization collaborating centre for education in radiology. He was also the scientific director of NICER Institute at Oslo, Norway. He presided over the European Congress of Radiology in 2001. He was a member of the editorial board of Acta Radiologica, European Journal of Radiology and Pediatric Radiology. He served as the adjunct professor of radiology at the University of Florida and at Sun Yat-Sen University in Guangzhou, China. He has co-authored 200 journal articles and dozens of book chapters. He has authored the Encyclopedia of Medical Imaging. He died in 2010 at 68 years of age.
