= George K. Anderson =

United States Air Force general

- Citizenship: American
- Education: Tulane University; University of Michigan
- Occupation: Major General

George K. Anderson (born 1940s) is a former major general in the United States Air Force.

== Early life ==
Anderson was born in Providence, Rhode Island. In 1964, he graduated from high school in İzmir, Turkey. He later graduated from the University of Michigan Medical School (MD) and Tulane University (MPH).

== Military career ==
From 1971 to 1972, Anderson was an intern at Wilford Hall Medical Center at Lackland Air Force Base. In 1973, he was stationed at Brooks Air Force Base. Two years later he assumed command of the hospital at Kunsan Air Base. Anderson later became chief of aeromedical services and assumed command of the hospital at Ramstein Air Base.

In 1979, Anderson returned to Brooks Air Force Base before attending the National War College from 1982 to 1983. Afterwards, he served as chief of the Medical Readiness Division and later deputy director of medical plans and resources in the Office of the Surgeon General of the United States Air Force. From 1987 to 1988, he was command surgeon of the Air Force Systems Command. After being stationed for a time at Norton Air Force Base, Anderson assumed command of the human systems division of the Air Force Systems Command.

From 1992 to 1994, Anderson was in command of the human systems center of Air Force Materiel Command. He was then assigned to The Pentagon as Deputy Assistant Secretary of Defense for Health Services Operations and Readiness before retiring.

== Awards ==
Awards he received during his career include the Air Force Distinguished Service Medal, the Legion of Merit, the Defense Meritorious Service Medal and the Meritorious Service Medal with three oak leaf clusters.
