= Steven C. Quay =

American biopharmaceutical executive and author

- Born: Steven Carl Quay; November 1950 (age 75)
- Education: Western Michigan University (BA); University of Michigan (MA, PhD, MD)
- Scientific career
- Fields: Pathology; medicinal chemistry; drug delivery; contrast media
- Thesis: Regulation of branched-chain amino acid transport in bacteria (1975)
- Doctoral advisor: Dale L. Oxender
- Website: drquay.com

Steven Carl Quay (born November 1950) is an American biopharmaceutical executive and author. He is the founder and chief executive officer (CEO) of Atossa Therapeutics. Previously, he founded the medical imaging company Salutar and the drug delivery company Sonus Pharmaceuticals, and led Nastech Pharmaceutical Company as chairman and CEO.

Since 2020 Quay has been a proponent of the lab-leak hypothesis for the origin of SARS-CoV-2, on which he has testified before the United States Congress.

== Early life and education ==
Quay grew up in Michigan and earned a bachelor's degree in biology, chemistry, and mathematics from Western Michigan University in 1971. He completed graduate study at the University of Michigan Medical School, receiving an MA (1974) and a PhD in biological chemistry (1975) before earning his MD in 1977. He then carried out postdoctoral research in the chemistry department of the Massachusetts Institute of Technology under Nobel laureate Har Gobind Khorana, and completed his residency in anatomical pathology at Massachusetts General Hospital.

== Career ==
From 1980 to the early 1990s Quay served on the faculty of Stanford University School of Medicine, where he held an appointment in the Department of Pathology, and concurrently practiced as a staff physician at the Palo Alto Veterans Administration Medical Center. In 1983, while still on the Stanford faculty, Quay founded Salutar, Inc., a California medical imaging company developing chelated-metal contrast agents for magnetic resonance imaging (MRI). Two of the agents developed at Salutar, the gadolinium-based gadodiamide (OmniScan) and the manganese-based mangafodipir (TeslaScan), were ultimately approved by the FDA for clinical use. Salutar was acquired by the Norwegian imaging firm Nycomed in 1990.

In 1991 Quay founded Sonus Pharmaceuticals, a Bothell-based company focused on emulsion- and surfactant-based drug delivery and ultrasound contrast agents, and served as its chairman and chief executive officer through 1999.

In August 2000 Quay was named chairman, president, and CEO of Nastech Pharmaceutical Company, after Nastech acquired his earlier breast health diagnostics venture, the original Atossa HealthCare, Inc. During his tenure, Nastech refocused its intranasal-delivery platform on adapting injectable drugs with billion-dollar markets for nasal administration, and formed joint ventures with companies including Pharmacia and Procter & Gamble. He led the company until 2009.

In 2009 Quay founded Atossa Therapeutics, a biopharmaceutical company based in Seattle. The company is listed on Nasdaq since 2012.

In 2021 Quay published a book, The Origin of the Virus: The hidden truths behind the microbe that killed millions of people, along with Angus Dalgleish and Paolo Barnard. The book claims that COVID leaked from a Chinese lab. He is also an author of a book named Stay Safe: A Physician's Guide to Survive Coronavirus.

In August 2026 Politico reported that Quay was a candidate to succeed Anthony Fauci as head of the NIH National Institute of Allergy and Infectious Diseases. Dr. Quay has 18 pubmed-listed publications in his career of which one manuscript is infectious diseases related, and has never received a NIH award, per NIH Reporter.

== Bibliography ==
=== Books ===
- Quay, Steven; Chen, Shu Chih (2016). Nipple Aspirate Fluid Exfoliative Cytopathology and Molecular Biomarkers: Current Role in the Management of Breast Health. Atossa Genetics. ISBN 978-0-9968496-2-3.
- Barnard, Paolo; Quay, Steven; Dalgleish, Angus (2021). The Origin of the Virus: The Hidden Truths Behind the Microbe That Killed Millions of People. Clinical Press Limited. ISBN 978-1-85457-106-9.

=== Publications ===
- Daniels, C. J.; Bole, D. G.; Quay, S. C.; Oxender, D. L. (September 1, 1981). "Role for membrane potential in the secretion of protein into the periplasm of Escherichia coli". Proceedings of the National Academy of Sciences. 78 (9): 5396–5400. Bibcode:1981PNAS...78.5396D. doi:10.1073/pnas.78.9.5396. PMC 348752. PMID 7029533.
- Dvorak, H. F.; Quay, S. C.; Orenstein, N. S.; Dvorak, A. M.; Hahn, P.; Bitzer, A. M.; Carvalho, A. C. (May 22, 1981). "Tumor Shedding and Coagulation". Science. 212 (4497): 923–924. Bibcode:1981Sci...212..923D. doi:10.1126/science.7195067. PMID 7195067.
- Re, Richard; Fallon, John T.; Dzau, Victor; Quay, Steven C.; Haber, Edgar (January 1982). "Renin synthesis by canine aortic smooth muscle cells in culture". Life Sciences. 30 (1): 99–106. doi:10.1016/0024-3205(82)90641-5. PMID 7033709.
- Rocklage, Scott M.; Cacheris, William P.; Quay, Steven C.; Hahn, F. Ekkehardt; Raymond, Kenneth N. (February 1989). "Manganese(II) N,N'-dipyridoxylethylenediamine-N,N'-diacetate 5,5'-bis(phosphate). Synthesis and characterization of a paramagnetic chelate for magnetic resonance imaging enhancement". Inorganic Chemistry. 28 (3): 477–485. doi:10.1021/ic00302a019.
- Cacheris, William P.; Quay, Steven C.; Rocklage, Scott M. (January 1990). "The relationship between thermodynamics and the toxicity of gadolinium complexes". Magnetic Resonance Imaging. 8 (4): 467–481. doi:10.1016/0730-725x(90)90055-7. PMID 2118207.
- Elizondo, G; Fretz, C J; Stark, D D; Rocklage, S M; Quay, S C; Worah, D; Tsang, Y M; Chen, M C; Ferrucci, J T (January 1991). "Preclinical evaluation of MnDPDP: new paramagnetic hepatobiliary contrast agent for MR imaging". Radiology. 178 (1): 73–78. doi:10.1148/radiology.178.1.1898538. PMID 1898538.
- Lim, K O; Stark, D D; Leese, P T; Pfefferbaum, A; Rocklage, S M; Quay, S C (January 1991). "Hepatobiliary MR imaging: first human experience with MnDPDP". Radiology. 178 (1): 79–82. doi:10.1148/radiology.178.1.1898539. PMID 1898539.
- Costantino, Henry R.; Illum, Lisbeth; Brandt, Gordon; Johnson, Paul H.; Quay, Steven C. (June 2007). "Intranasal delivery: Physicochemical and therapeutic aspects". International Journal of Pharmaceutics. 337 (1–2): 1–24. doi:10.1016/j.ijpharm.2007.03.025. PMID 17475423.
