= Reed M. Nesbit =

American urologist and surgeon (1898–1979)

Reed Miller Nesbit was an American urologist, surgeon, and professor. He was Head of the Urology Section of the Department of Surgery at the University of Michigan Medical School in Ann Arbor, Michigan, from 1930–1967. Nesbit was a pioneer of transurethral resection of the prostate. He devised the Nesbit operation for treating Peyronie's disease, and he made prominent contributions to pediatric urology, most notably the Cabot-Nesbit style orchiopexy.

== Life and career ==
Nesbit was born in Concord, California, and studied first at the University of California, Berkeley, then at Stanford University, where he earned his AB in 1921 and MD in 1924. He interned at the Fresno County Hospital in Fresno, California, before he was recruited to Michigan by Hugh Cabot, the Director of Surgery at the University of Michigan and a prominent genitourinary surgeon. During his first year in Michigan Nesbit shared a room with Charles Huggins, another Cabot recruit who later went on to win a Nobel prize for his work on hormonal control of prostate cancer.

In 1926, Nesbit became an Instructor in Surgery. In 1929 he was promoted to Assistant Professor, and a year later he became Chief of the Section of Urology. In 1943, he attained the rank of professor. He served as Head of the Urology Section of the Department of Surgery for 37 years. His work at Michigan brought him national and international fame. By the end of his tenure his advances in surgical procedures and techniques were recorded in over 150 articles. He was at the forefront of endoscopic surgery to treat prostatic disease, and his 1943 textbook, Transurethral Prostatectomy, became the standard textbook on this subject in the United States. He also published the textbook Fundamentals of Urology in 1942. Many surgeons throughout the United States and all over the world came to Ann Arbor to learn his innovative techniques. In 1957 he established a pioneering dialysis unit at the University of Michigan, unusual in that it was run by surgeons, not internists. Nesbit became President of the American College of Surgeons in 1967, the first urologist to hold that position. He trained over 80 residents, at least 18 of whom became chiefs of urology in medical schools in the United States and abroad.

After Nesbit retired in 1968 he moved to El Macero, California, where he served as lecturer of surgery and special assistant to the dean at the University of California, Davis School of Medicine. In 1969 Nesbit became chairman of the Board of Commissioners of the Joint Commission on Accreditation of Hospitals.

In 2007 the Reed Nesbit Professorship in Urology was established at the University of Michigan in his honor, with Edward J. McGuire serving as the first Nesbit Professor.

The Reed M. Nesbit Urologic Society is the alumni organization of the Department of Urology at the University of Michigan and was constituted in 1972. The membership of the society includes residents who trained at Michigan, clinical fellows, faculty, and selected others. The society meets each year in Ann Arbor and also at the annual meeting of the American Urological Association.
