= C.S. Mott Children's Hospital =

Pediatric hospital in Ann Arbor, Michigan, U.S.

- Michigan Medicine

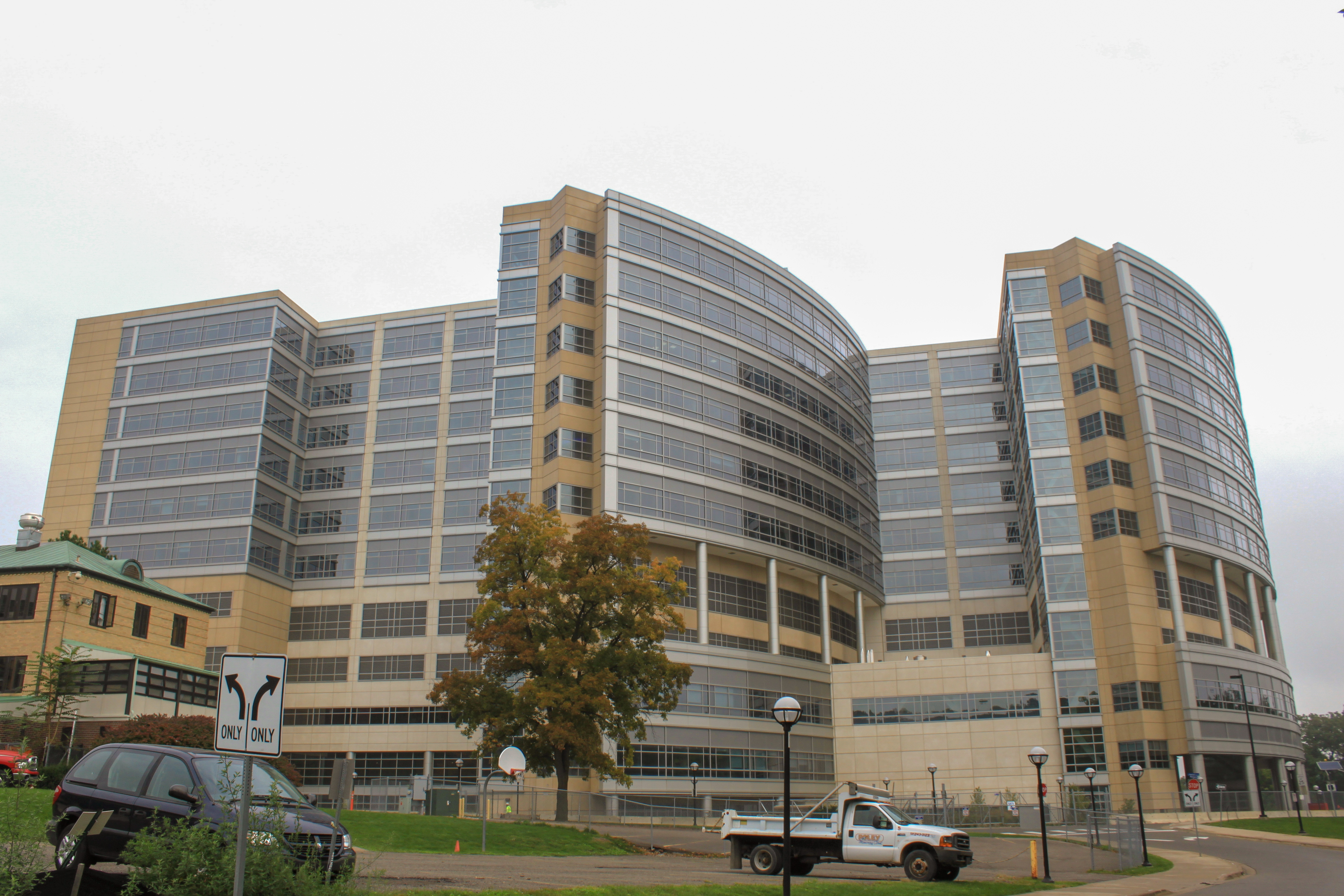
- C.S. Mott Children's & Von Voigtlander Women's Hospital

- Location within Michigan

Geography
- Location: Ann Arbor, Michigan, United States
- Coordinates: 42°16′56″N 83°43′41″W

Organization
- Type: Specialist
- Affiliated university: University of Michigan School of Medicine

Services
- Emergency department: Level I Pediatric Trauma Center
- Beds: 348
- Speciality: Pediatric

Helipads
- Helipad: FAA LID: MI50

History
- Constructed: 2006
- Founded: Original Building: 1969; New Building: 2011

Links
- Website: MottChildren.org
- Lists: Hospitals in the United States

C.S. Mott Children's Hospital is a pediatric acute care hospital located in Ann Arbor, Michigan, United States. The hospital has 244 pediatric beds and is affiliated with the University of Michigan Medical School. The hospital provides comprehensive pediatric specialties and subspecialties to infants, children, teens, and young adults 0-21 throughout Michigan and the surrounding states. The hospital sometimes also treats older adults that require pediatric care. C.S. Mott Children's Hospital also features a Level I Pediatric Trauma Center, 1 of 3 in the state. Attached to the children's hospital is the Von Voigtlander Women's Hospital that provides maternal and gynecological care for women.

The hospital moved to a newly constructed building in 2011.

Although commonly understood to be a physical health complex, C.S. Mott Children's Hospital also includes a youth and adolescent psychiatric ward separate from the rest of the children's hospital. The C. S. Mott Children's and Von Voigtlander Women's Hospital employs about 4,000 people and is gradually hiring 500 more now that the hospital expansion is complete.

== History ==
The University of Michigan first established a pediatric program in 1903 when they opened up a 75-bed children's unit. The unit was one of the first dedicated pediatric units' in the nation.

In 1965, American businessman and philanthropist C.S. Mott donated $6.5 million to the University of Michigan to help the university build its first children's hospital. The 200 bed hospital served about 3,500 children in its first year of operation.

In the late 1980s, the university renovated its pediatric wards to accommodate private patient rooms instead of previous open wards.

The new facility for the C. S. Mott Children's and Von Voigtlander Women's Hospital, opened in December 2011 following the completion of a $754 million, five-year construction project. It is one of the largest children's hospitals in the United States. The hospital is 1,100,000 sq ft (100,000 m^{2}) and consists of a 12-story inpatient wing and a nine-story outpatient wing. There are 348 beds, including 50 maternity rooms and 46 neonatal intensive care unit (NICU) rooms. The expansion increases the number of beds at the hospital by 75 percent and makes the hospital the largest of Michigan's three children's hospitals. Every inpatient room is private, in contrast to the old facility, which had mostly double occupancy rooms. The new hospital has 16 operating rooms and two interventional radiology rooms. The first Women's Hospital opened in 1950, while the original C.S. Mott Children's Hospital opened in 1969 and traces its origin to a small ward for sick children that began in 1903.

The new hospital was the most expensive building project in University of Michigan history and one of the most expensive construction projects in state history. Of the $754 million cost, the university financed $588 million through tax-exempt bonds, $91 million through cash reserves from hospital operations, and $75 million through fundraising.

The Charles Stewart Mott foundation contributed $25 million to the construction of the new hospital. The building contains 348 single, private room beds divided between the children's and women's hospital including a dedicated pediatric emergency department and trauma center.

University of Michigan officials have released plans to convert the old 1969 era C.S. Mott Children's Hospital building into renovated patient wards for the adult University Hospital to allow for the addition of private patient rooms.

The children's hospital is consistently ranked as one of the top pediatric centers in the country according to U.S. News & World Report.

In August 2020, doctors at C.S. Mott Children's Hospital successfully separated 1-year-old conjoined twins Sarabeth and Amelia Irwin. The twins were attached at the liver and the surgery to detach the twins took about 11 hours. The twins became the first pair of conjoined twins to be successfully separated in Michigan.

In November 2020, Dwayne "The Rock" Johnson collaborated with Microsoft and billionaire Bill Gates to donate Xbox Series X consoles to C.S. Mott Children's Hospital along with 19 other children's hospitals throughout the country.

== About ==
=== Patient Care Units ===
The hospital has a variety of patient care units to care for infants, children, teens and young adults 0-21, with some units caring for adult patients, too. In addition to the patient care units the hospital also has 16 operating rooms with 76 PACU beds.

Beds	Floor	Unit	Ages
32-bed	7 East and West	Pediatric and Adult Hematology Oncology and BMT Unit	all ages
46-bed	8 West	Neonatal Intensive Care Unit	Newborns
30-bed	10 East	Pediatric Intensive Care Unit	0-21
30-bed	10 West	Pediatric Cardiothoracic Unit	all ages (achd)
32-bed	11 West	Pediatric General Care Unit	0-21
32-bed	12 East	Pediatric General Care Unit	0-21
32-bed	12 West	Pediatric General Care Unit	0-21
50-bed		Maternity Rooms	Women

=== Awards ===
In 2015, the hospital was named as one of "The 50 Most Amazing Children’s Hospitals in the World" by Top Master's in Healthcare Administration.

In 2019, Michigan Medicine was named as having some of the top teaching hospitals in the U.S. by The Leapfrog Group.

In 2019 the hospital ranked as the best children's hospital in Michigan by U.S. News & World Report.

As of the 2020-21 rankings, C.S. Mott Children's Hospital has placed nationally in all 10 ranked pediatric specialties on U.S. News & World Report.

U.S. News & World Report Rankings for C.S. Mott Children's Hospital
Specialty	Rank (In the U.S.)	Score (Out of 100)
Neonatology	#44	79.0
Pediatric Cancer	#26	77.5
Pediatric Cardiology & Heart Surgery	#24	78.1
Pediatric Diabetes & Endocrinology	#16	74.8
Pediatric Gastroenterology & GI Surgery	#28	78.8
Pediatric Nephrology	#17	78.8
Pediatric Neurology & Neurosurgery	#20	82.5
Pediatric Orthopedics	#22	74.5
Pediatric Pulmonology & Lung Surgery	#18	79.5
Pediatric Urology	#22	68.0

== Von Voigtlander Women's Hospital ==
Von Voigtlander Women's Hospital is an maternal care woman's hospital physically located within C.S. Mott Children's Hospital. The hospital provides maternal and gynecological care to the region's women. Von Voigtlander Women's Hospital benefits from being located within a children's hospital because of quick access to tertiary pediatric care for newborns. The women's hospital has 50 beds.

The hospital was named after the Ted and Jane Von Voigtlander Foundation donated $15 million towards the construction of the new women's and children's hospital in 2009.

As of the 2020-21 rankings, Von Voigtlander Women's Hospital has placed nationally as #39 in gynecology on the U.S. News & World Report.

== Gallery ==
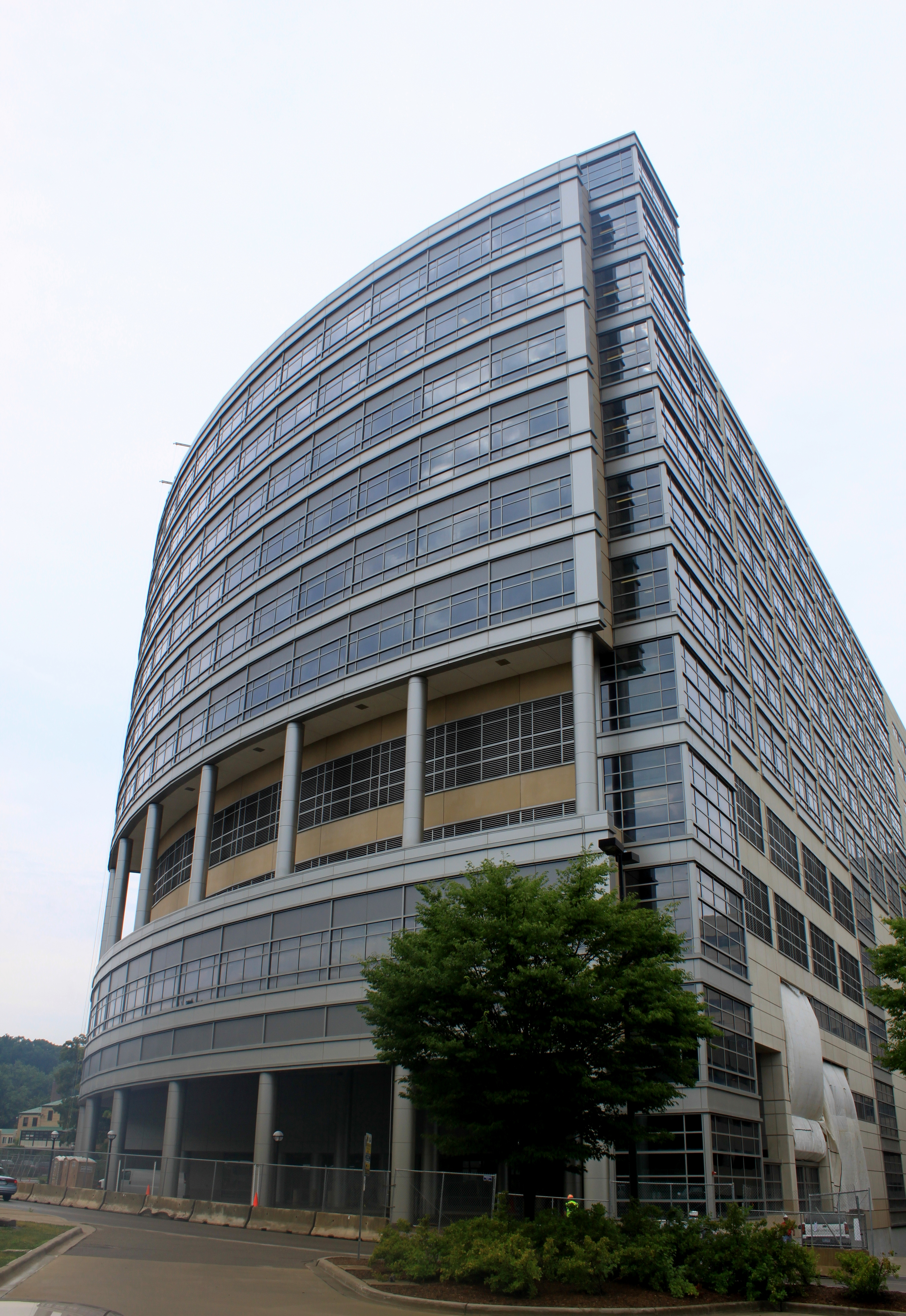
The side of the new hospital.

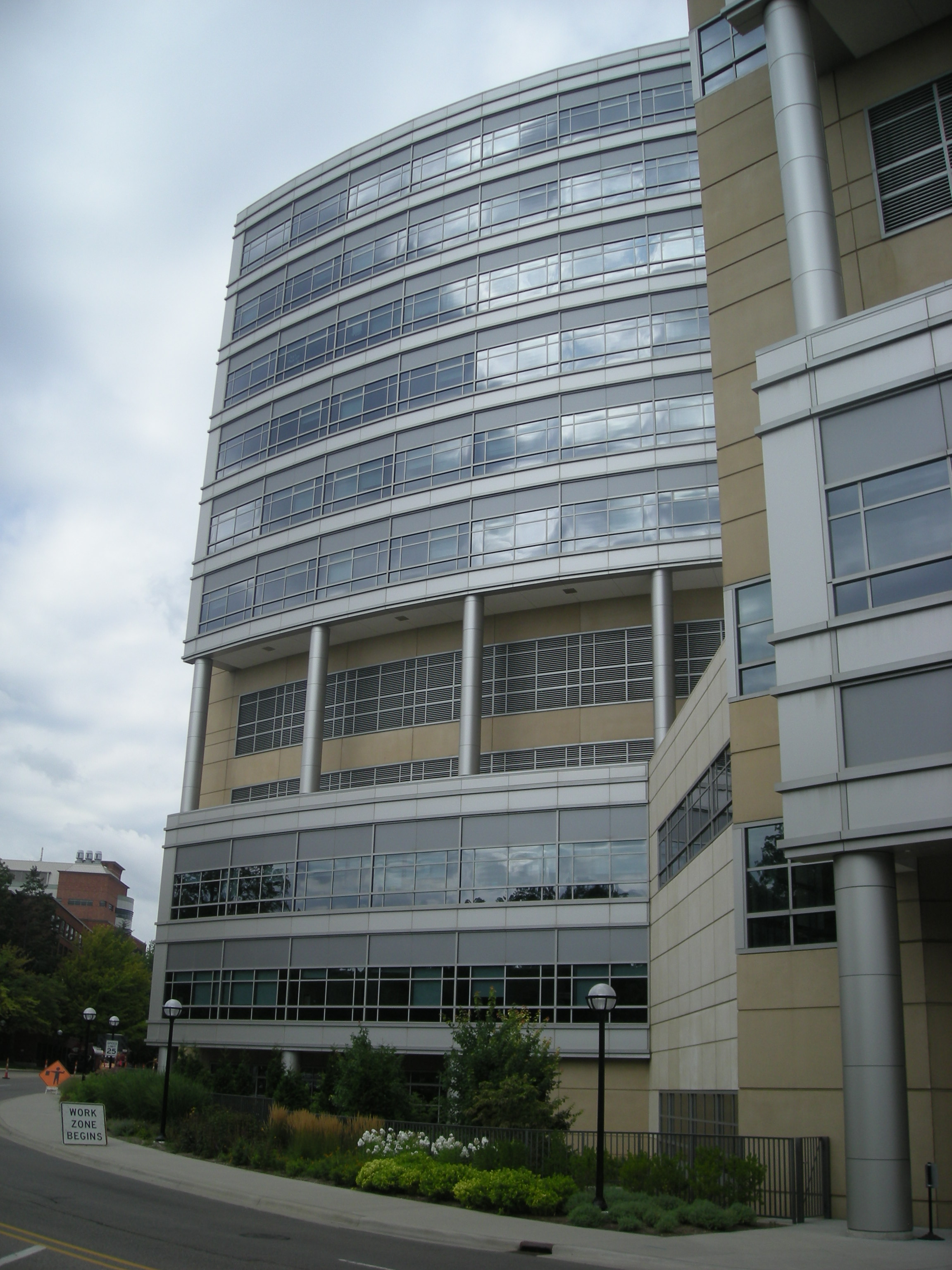

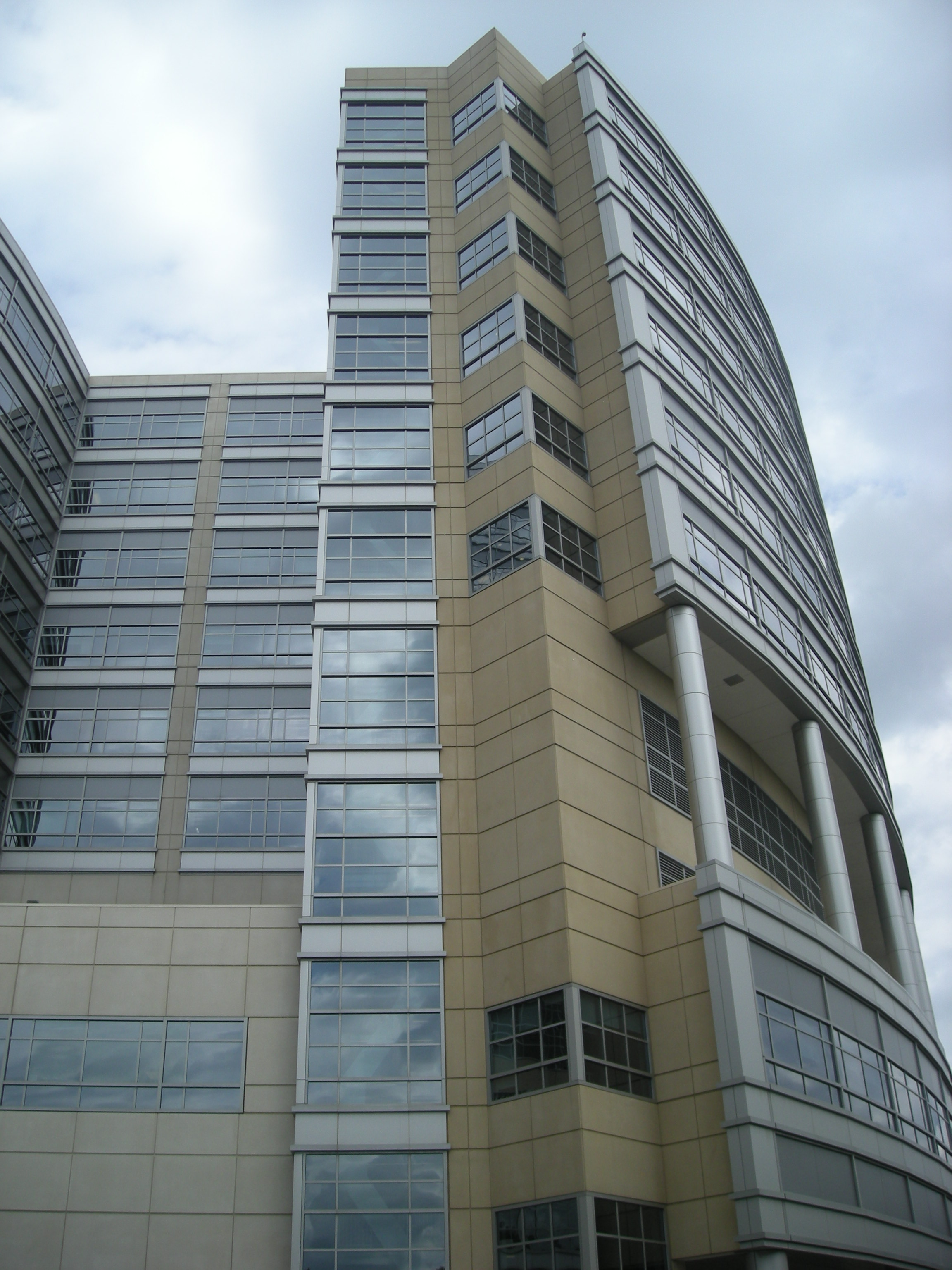
Another picture of the side of the new pavilion.

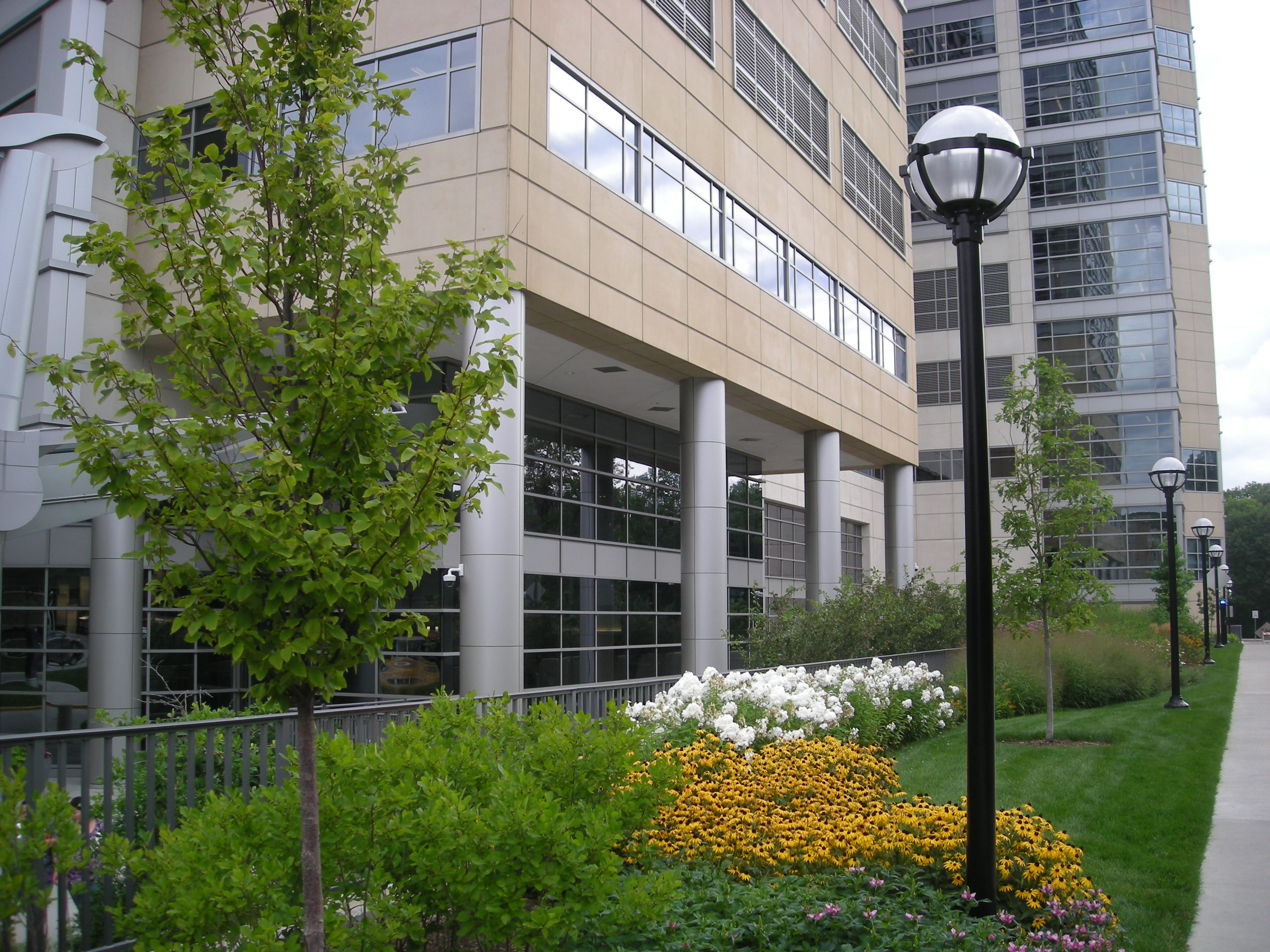

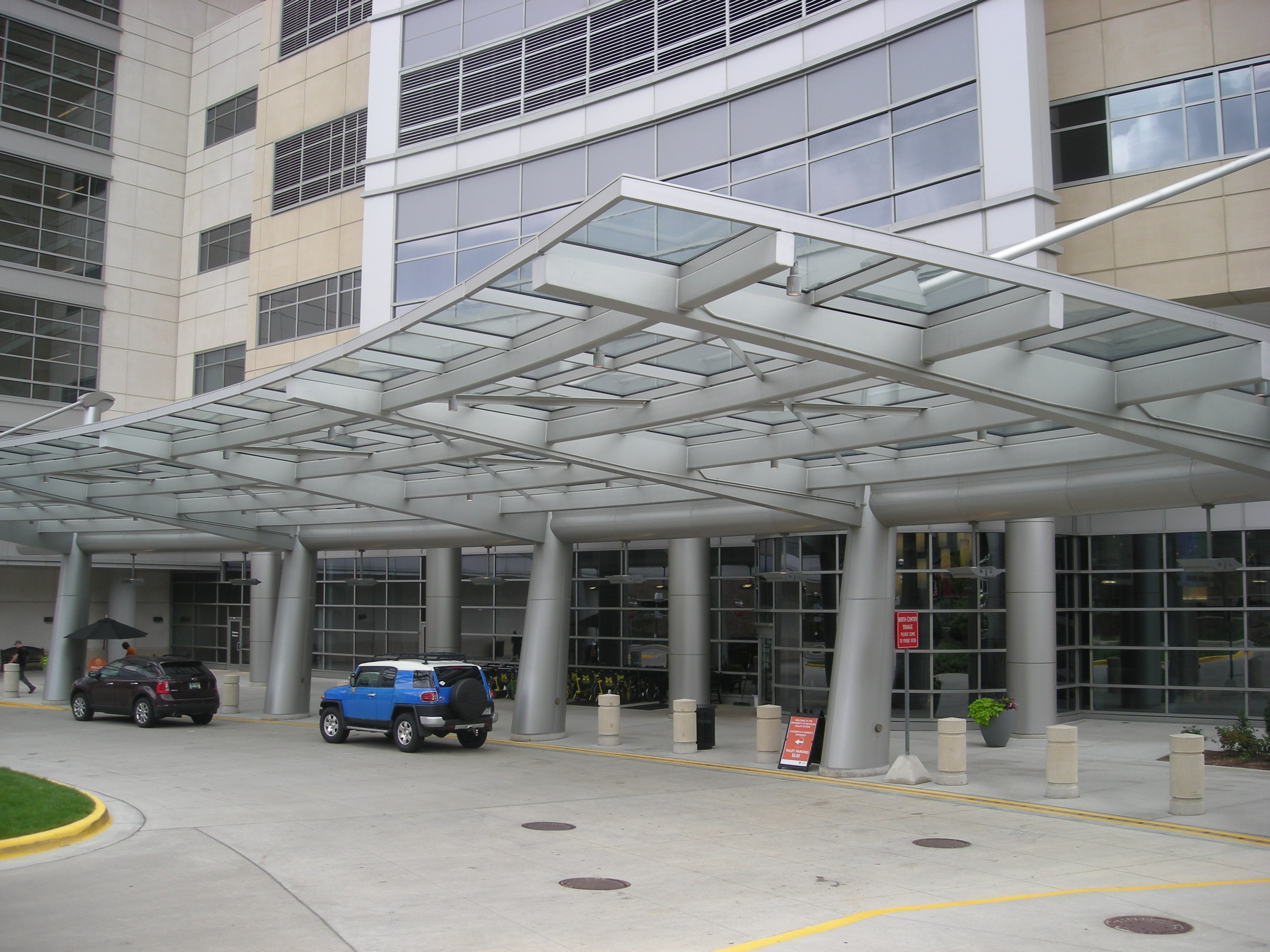
Main entrance to the hospital.

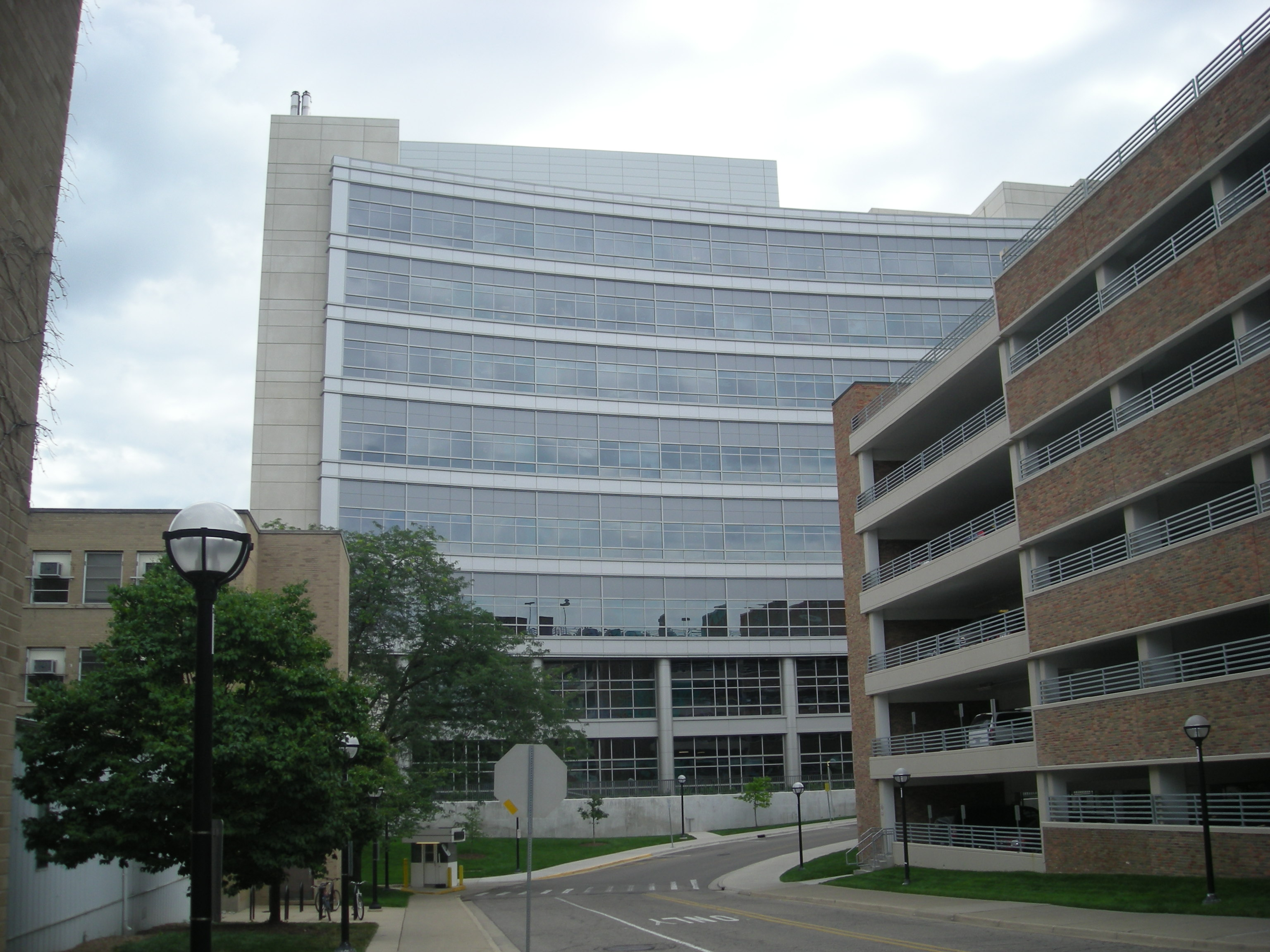

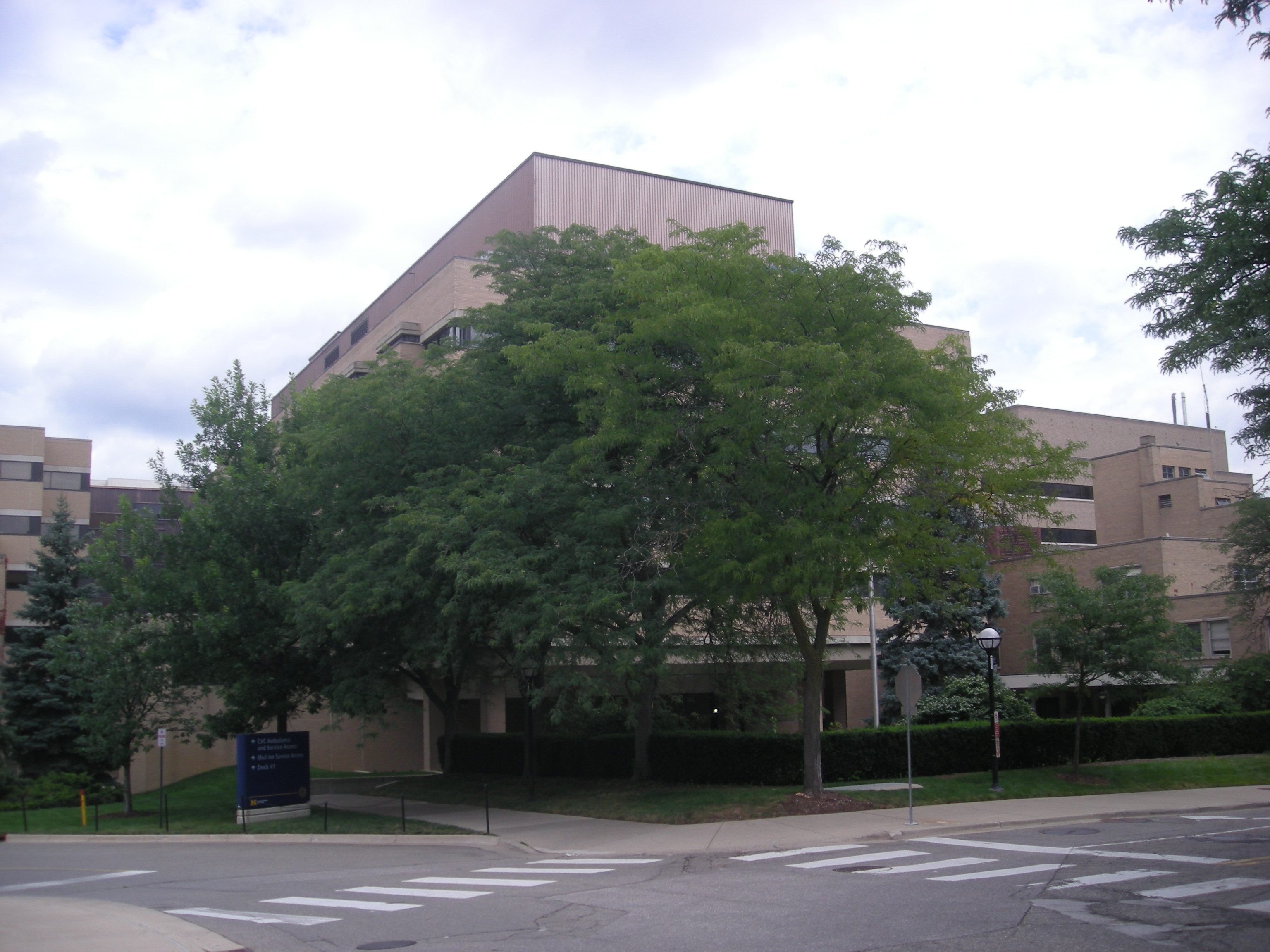
A picture of the old Mott Children's Hospital. Michigan plans to eventually integrate this into the adult hospital.

== See also ==
- University of Michigan
- Michigan Medicine
- Helen DeVos Children's Hospital
