= Robert Bartlett (surgeon) =

American physician and medical researcher (1939–2025)

Robert H. Bartlett
- Born: May 8, 1939; Ann Arbor, Michigan, US
- Died: October 20, 2025 (aged 86); Ann Arbor, Michigan, US
- Education: University of Michigan Medical School; Albion College
- Known for: Work on extracorporeal membrane oxygenation
- Scientific career
- Fields: Thoracic surgery
- Workplaces: University of Michigan Medical School

Robert Hawes Bartlett (May 8, 1939 – October 20, 2025) was an American physician and medical researcher who is credited with developing a lifesaving heart-lung technology known as extracorporeal membrane oxygenation (ECMO). He was a professor of surgery at the University of Michigan Medical School.

== Education ==
Bartlett was born in Ann Arbor, Michigan on May 8, 1939. He graduated from Albion College and the University of Michigan Medical School. He later completed general surgery and thoracic surgery post-graduate training at the Brigham and Children's hospitals in Boston, Massachusetts.

== Career ==
Bartlett spent ten years on the faculty of the University of California, Irvine School of Medicine. Through laboratory research that began in the 1960s, Bartlett helped to develop ECMO technology for babies with potentially reversible heart or lung dysfunction.

Bartlett reported the first neonatal survivor of ECMO, referred to as Baby Esperanza, in 1976. Baby Esperanza suffered lung damage from meconium aspiration syndrome and she was so sick that ECMO was applied as a last-ditch effort to save her life. The baby spent three days on Bartlett's machine and she recovered.

In 1980, Bartlett came back to the University of Michigan and joined the faculty. He spent 25 years as the director of Michigan's surgical intensive care unit. He held positions as Chief of General Surgery, program director of the Surgical Critical Care fellowship, and director of the extracorporeal life support laboratory and clinical service. He helped to start a breast care center affiliated with the university health system in 1984. He established the Extracorporeal Life Support Organization in 1989. He retired from the operating room in 2005 and directs the extracorporeal life support laboratory. The University of Michigan Medical School established the Robert Bartlett Professorship in Pediatric Surgery.

Bartlett began to write fiction late in his medical career. He became interested in writing stories about medicine and the law after testifying as an expert on burns in the appeal of a man's conviction for child abuse. Though Bartlett was convinced that the defendant was innocent, the man's conviction was not overturned. Bartlett began to write fiction based in part on his experience with burn patients. His first novel was published in 2005. His second novel is Piece of Mind, a novel of medicine and philosophy which explores the mind/body question from the point of view of a neurosurgeon and his patients.

Bartlett's research has been continuously funded by NIH since 1971. In addition to ECMO he made major contributions to critical care physiology, acute kidney injury and continuous hemofiltration, and nutrition in critical illness. He has been president of the American Society of Artificial Internal Organs and the International Federation of Artificial Organs. He was a charter member of the American Institute of Biomedical Engineering and consulted with medical companies related to critical care. With others he founded the bioengineering company MC3 and was the chief medical officer for CytoSorbents Corporation, a biomedical company that manufactures blood purification technology to treat critically ill patients.

In 2003, Bartlett was awarded the William E. Ladd Medal by the American Academy of Pediatrics. The organization says that the medal "represents the highest honor that the Section on Surgery bestows on a physician in recognition of outstanding contributions to the field of pediatric surgery". He was awarded the Medallion of Achievement by the American Surgical Association, the Robert E. Gross award by the American Pediatric Surgical Association, and the Sheen Award by the American College of Surgeons. He was elected to the Institute of Medicine of the National Academy of Sciences.

== Death ==
Bartlett died in Ann Arbor on October 20, 2025, at the age of 86.

== Publications ==
=== Books ===
- Bartlett, Robert H. (2005). The Salem Syndrome: A Novel of Medicine and Law. First Page Publications. ISBN 1928623255.
- Bartlett, Robert H. (2007). Piece of Mind: A novel of medicine and philosophy. First Page Publications.
- Bartlett, Robert H. (2010). Critical Care Physiology. J. B. Lippincott
