= Keith Black (surgeon) =

American neurosurgeon

- Born: September 13, 1957 (age 68); Tuskegee, Alabama, United States
- Education: University of Michigan Medical School
- Known for: Brain tumor surgery and research
- Medical career
- Profession: Neurosurgeon
- Institutions: University of Michigan Medical School; UCLA Medical Center; Cedars-Sinai Medical Center

Keith L. Black (born September 13, 1957) is an American neurosurgeon specializing in the treatment of brain tumors and a prolific campaigner for funding of cancer treatment. He is chairman of the neurosurgery department and director of the Maxine Dunitz Neurosurgical Institute at Cedars-Sinai Medical Center in Los Angeles, California.

== Early life ==
Keith Black was born in Tuskegee, Alabama. His mother, Lillian, was a teacher and his father, Robert, was the principal at a racially segregated elementary school in Auburn, Alabama; prohibited by law to integrate the student body, Black's father instead integrated the faculty, raised standards, and brought more challenging subjects to the school.

Seeking better educational opportunities, Black's parents found new jobs and relocated the family to Shaker Heights, Ohio where he attended Shaker Heights High School. Already interested in medicine, Black was admitted to an apprenticeship program for minority students at Case Western Reserve University, and then became a teenage lab assistant for Frederick Cross and Richard Jones (inventors of the Cross-Jones artificial heart valve) at St. Luke's Hospital in Cleveland.

At 17, he won an award in a national science competition for research on the damage done to red blood cells in patients with heart-valve replacements. He attended the University of Michigan in a program that allowed him to earn both his undergraduate degree and his medical degree in 6 years. He received his M.D. degree from the University of Michigan Medical School in 1981.

== Career ==
After serving his internship and residency at the University of Michigan, in 1987 he moved to the UCLA Medical Center in Los Angeles, where he later became head of UCLA's Comprehensive Brain Tumor Program. In 1997, after 10 years at UCLA, he moved to Cedars-Sinai Medical Center to head the Maxine Dunitz Neurosurgical Institute. He was also on the faculty of the University of California, Irvine School of Medicine from 1998 to 2003. In 2006, he was appointed Chair of Neurosurgery at Cedars-Sinai, and in 2007, was appointed director of the newly opened Johnnie L. Cochran Jr. Brain Tumor Center at Cedars-Sinai, a research center named after the famous lawyer who had been Black's patient and supporter.

Black has been a frequent subject of media reports on medical advances in neurosurgery. He was featured in a 1996 episode of the PBS program The New Explorers entitled "Outsmarting the Brain". Esquire included him in its November 1999 "Genius Issue" as one of the "21 Most Important People of the 21st Century." He has been cited as an expert in reports about whether mobile phone use affects the incidence of brain tumors.

He is also noted for his very busy surgery schedule: a 2004 Discover article noted that he performs about 250 brain surgeries per year, and that at age 46 he had "already performed more than 4,000 brain surgeries, the medical equivalent of closing in on baseball's all-time career hits record." (As of 2009, Black's surgery count had risen to "more than 5,000 operations for resection of brain tumors".)

In 1997, Time magazine featured Black on the cover of a special edition called "Heroes of Medicine". The accompanying article described Black's reputation as a surgeon who would operate on tumors that other doctors would not, as well as aspects of his medical research, including his discovery that the peptide bradykinin can be effective in opening the blood–brain barrier.

In 2009 Black published his autobiography, co-authored with Arnold Mann, entitled Brain Surgeon. New York Times reviewer Abigail Zuger described the book as a "fascinating, if somewhat stilted, memoir". The Publishers Weekly review commented that the book "examines racial hurdles he had to leap to become a neurosurgeon" and "alternat[es] incisive writing about incisions with his personal memoir, insightful and inspirational."
