= NICER Institute =

Nycomed Amersham Intercontinental Continuing Education in Radiology Institute or NICER Institute was an educational institute for training in radiology headquartered in Oslo, Norway. It was founded by Professor Holger Pettersson, president of the European Association of Radiology and Dr. Harald Ostensen. It offered 50 courses in 22 countries over the world and published various educational materials, including collaboration in publishing of the comprehensive 8-volume Encyclopaedia of Medical Imaging. The institute was closed in December 2001, partially due to financial reasons.
