= C. Michael Gibson =

American interventional cardiologist

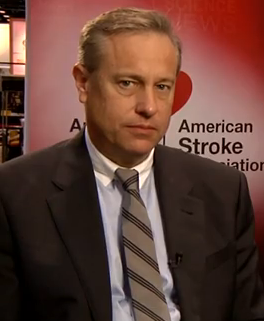
- Born: Tulsa, Oklahoma
- Education: University of Chicago, UofC Pritzker School of Medicine, Brigham and Women's Hospital - Harvard Medical School, Beth Israel Deaconess Medical Center - Harvard Medical School
- Occupations: Interventional cardiologist, researcher, professor
- Years active: 1993-present
- Known for: Inventing TIMI frame count and TIMI myocardial perfusion grade, PERFUSE, founder of WikiDoc, leader of the Baim Institute (formerly Harvard Clinical Research Institute)
- Medical career
- Field: Interventional cardiology
- Website: https://www.wikidoc.org/index.php/User:C_Michael_Gibson

Charles Michael Gibson is an American interventional cardiologist cardiovascular researcher, and professor of medicine at Harvard Medical School. He is best known for inventing the TIMI frame count and the TIMI myocardial perfusion grade, angiographic and perfusion measures of coronary blood flow that have been adopted in international cardiology research and for leading large scale international trials of cardiovascular therapies.

== Early life and education ==
Gibson was born and raised in Tulsa and Stilwell, Oklahoma. He attended middle school and high school in Kankakee Illinois. He attended the University of Chicago, earning a Bachelor of Science in biological sciences in 1982 and election to Phi Beta Kappa. He went on to complete a Master of Science (1984) and a Doctor of Medicine (MD, 1986) at the University of Chicago Pritzker School of Medicine, where he graduated with honors and was elected to Alpha Omega Alpha.

In 1989, Gibson completed his internship and residency in internal medicine at Brigham and Women's Hospital at Harvard Medical School. From 1989 to 1993, he was a cardiology fellow at Beth Israel Deaconess Medical Center at Harvard Medical School.

== Career ==
In 1992, Gibson returned to Brigham and Women’s Hospital to serve as Chief Medical Resident. He subsequently held positions as Director of the Coronary Care Unit of Beth Israel Deaconess Medical Center, Director of the Cardiac Catheterization Laboratory and Chief of Cardiology at the West Roxbury Veterans Administration Hospital, and later Cath Lab Director and Associate Chief of Cardiology at the University of California, San Francisco. He returned to Boston as Associate Chief of Cardiology at Beth Israel Deaconess Medical Center, where he later became Chief of Clinical Research in the Cardiovascular Division.

Gibson is the inventor of the TIMI frame count and the TIMI myocardial perfusion grade, tools that standardized the assessment of coronary blood flow and myocardial reperfusion in clinical trials.

He has led and participated in more than 100 phase I–IV clinical trials and cardiovascular megatrials, some exceeding 30,000 patients. He was principal investigator of the PIONEER AF-PCI trial, which demonstrated that dual therapy with an anticoagulant and single antiplatelet agent reduced bleeding risk compared with triple therapy in patients with atrial fibrillation undergoing coronary stenting.

Gibson founded and heads PERFUSE, an academic research and data coordinating organization established in 1989. PERFUSE created a TIMI master database covering 25 years and involving more than 100,000 patients. He also serves as CEO of the Baim Institute for Clinical Research, formerly the Harvard Clinical Research Institute.

In 2005, Gibson founded WikiDoc, an open-access medical encyclopedia, where he serves as Editor-in-Chief. He collaborated with Microsoft, Google, and Yahoo! on the Schema.org medical classification system to improve health-related search results.

From 2017 to 2021, Gibson served as a standing member of the U.S. Food and Drug Administration’s Cardiovascular and Renal Drugs Advisory Committee, and later as an at-large member.

== Research ==
Gibson's research has focused on quantitative angiographic methods, myocardial reperfusion, core laboratory methodology for multicenter clinical trials, antithrombotic and anticoagulant therapy, and broad data-driven approaches to improving clinical trial reproducibility and imaging end points.

=== Angiographic and perfusion metrics ===
Gibson developed the TIMI frame count (TFC), later standardized as the corrected TIMI frame count (CTFC), as a simple, reproducible, continuous variable index of epicardial coronary blood flow that can be measured from routine coronary angiography. The original description and validation of the TIMI frame count were published in Circulation (1996) and have been widely cited and adopted in clinical research as an objective complement to categorical TIMI flow grades.

He also developed and validated the TIMI myocardial perfusion grades (TMPG), a semiquantitative measure of tissue-level (microvascular) myocardial perfusion (or “myocardial blush”) on angiography. TMPG was shown in TIMI program analyses to correlate with ST-segment resolution, digital subtraction angiography measures, magnetic resonance imaging indices of microinfarction, and with short- and long-term clinical outcomes after reperfusion for acute myocardial infarction.

=== Core laboratories, data coordination and PERFUSE ===
In 1987, Gibson founded PERFUSE, an academic core-laboratory and data-coordinating center that manages angiographic, ECG, cardiac-MRI, and trial-data services. Under his leadership, PERFUSE built a TIMI master database unifying angiographic and outco me data from decades of TIMI trials. It has provided core-lab and coordinating support for numerous Phase I–IV and device trials.

=== Clinical trial leadership and antithrombotic strategy trials ===
Gibson led the PIONEER AF-PCI trial, published in the New England Journal of Medicine (2016), which compared rivaroxaban- and warfarin-based therapies in patients with atrial fibrillation undergoing PCI. The study showed reduced bleeding with rivaroxaban and influenced later guidelines and trials on dual versus triple antithrombotic therapy.

== Editorial and teaching activities ==
Gibson has been a member of the editorial boards of Circulation, Journal of the American College of Cardiology (JACC), Journal of Thrombosis and Thrombolysis, and Cardiovascular Revascularization Medicine. He has supervised medical students, residents, and fellows at Harvard Medical School and has trained a number of academic cardiologists through PERFUSE and the TIMI Study Group.

== Recognition ==
In 2014, Thomson Reuters named Gibson one of the most influential scientific minds of 2002–2012. He was selected as one of Boston magazine’s Top Doctors (2009–2012), one of America’s Top Doctors in U.S. News & World Report (2010–2014), and recognized by Castle Connolly Medical in 2012. He has also received international honors, including gold medals from institutions in China and Poland, and has had research centers named in his honor abroad.

In 2021, a peer-reviewed article in AIMS Public Health ranked Gibson as the number one cardiology influencer on Twitter.

Gibson is also an artist and his work has been featured in the Los Angeles Times and includes the cover painting for Braunwald’s Textbook of Cardiology. His portrait of Peter Libby is displayed at Brigham and Women’s Hospital, and his painting Redemption appeared on the cover of Ars Medica (Vol. 11, No. 3, 2017).

== Selected publications ==
- Gibson, C. Michael; Cannon, Christopher P.; Daley, William L.; Dodge, Jr., J. Theodore; Alexander, Barbara; Marble, Susan J.; McCabe, Carolyn H.; Raymond, Lori; Fortin, Terry; Poole, W. Kenneth; Braunwald, Eugene (1996-03-01). "TIMI Frame Count: A Quantitative Method of Assessing Coronary Artery Flow". Circulation. 93 (5): 879–888. doi:10.1161/01.CIR.93.5.879. PMID 8598078.
- Antman, Elliott M.; Louwerenburg, Hans W.; Baars, Hubert F.; Wesdorp, Jan C.L.; Hamer, Bas; Bassand, Jean-Pierre; Bigonzi, Frederique; Pisapia, Ghislaine; Gibson, C. Michael; Heidbuchel, Hein; Braunwald, Eugene; Van de Werf, Frans (2002-06-11). "Enoxaparin as adjunctive antithrombin therapy for ST-elevation myocardial infarction: results of the ENTIRE-Thrombolysis in Myocardial Infarction (TIMI) 23 Trial". Circulation. 105 (23): 1642–1649. doi:10.1161/01.cir.0000013402.34759.46. PMID 11940541. S2CID 10913188.
- Gibson, C. Michael; Cannon, Christopher P.; Murphy, Sabina A.; Marble, Susan J.; Barron, Hal V.; Braunwald, Eugene (2002-04-23). "Relationship of the TIMI Myocardial Perfusion Grades, Flow Grades, Frame Count, and Percutaneous Coronary Intervention to Long-Term Outcomes After Thrombolytic Administration in Acute Myocardial Infarction". Circulation. 105 (16): 1909–13. doi:10.1161/01.cir.0000014683.52177.b5. PMID 11997276. S2CID 14532554.
- Wong, Graham C.; Morrow, David A.; Murphy, Sabina; Kraimer, Nicole; Pai, Rupal; James, David; Robertson, Debbie H.; Demopoulos, Laura A.; DiBattiste, Peter; Cannon, Christopher P.; Gibson, C. Michael (2002-06-09). "Elevations in Troponin T and I Are Associated With Abnormal Tissue Level Perfusion: A TACTICS-TIMI 18 Substudy". Circulation. 106 (2): 202–7. doi:10.1161/01.cir.0000021921.14653.28. PMID 12105159. S2CID 25990116.
- Kunadian, Vijayalakshmi; Harrigan, Caitlin; Zorkun, Cafer; Palmer, Alexandra M.; Ogando, Katherine J.; Biller, Leah H.; Lord, Erin E.; Williams, Scott P.; Lew, Michelle E.; Ciaglo, Lauren N.; Buros, Jacqueline L.; Marble, Susan J.; Gibson, William J.; Gibson, C. Michael (2008-04-20). "Use of the TIMI frame count in the assessment of coronary artery blood flow and microvascular function over the past 15 years". Journal of Thrombosis and Thrombolysis. 27 (3): 316–28. doi:10.1007/s11239-008-0220-3. PMID 18425623. S2CID 5726438.
- Gibson, C. Michael; Mehran, Roxana; Bode, Christoph; Halperin, Jonathan; Verheugt, Freek W.; Wildgoose, Peter; Birmingham, Mary; Ianus, Juliana; Burton, Paul; van Eickels, Martin; Korjian, Serge; Daaboul, Yazan; Lip, Gregory Y.H.; Cohen, Marc; Husted, Steen; Peterson, Eric D.; Fox, Keith A. (2016-12-22). "Prevention of Bleeding in Patients with Atrial Fibrillation Undergoing PCI". New England Journal of Medicine. 375 (25): 2423–2434. doi:10.1056/NEJMoa1611594. hdl:20.500.11820/b2bee2e8-0ce9-4963-9c3f-3a43ec8c6526. PMID 27959713.
