= Brian D. Athey =

American computational biologist

Brian D. Athey Ph.D.
- Education: University of Michigan (Ph.D.)
- Known for: Michael Savageau Collegiate Professorship; Founding Chair, Department of Computational Medicine and Bioinformatics
- Awards: Peace Fellowship, Federation of American Scientists (2005); Fellow, American College of Medical Informatics (FACMI); Fellow, American Association for the Advancement of Science (AAAS)
- Scientific career
- Fields: Computational biology; Bioinformatics; Biomedical informatics; Biophysics
- Workplaces: University of Michigan Medical School – Founding Chair, Department of Computational Medicine and Bioinformatics; University of Michigan Medical School – Department of Psychiatry; University of Michigan Medical School – Department of Internal Medicine
- Website: athey.lab.medicine.umich.edu

Brian D. Athey is an American computational biologist and professor. He is the Michael Savageau Collegiate Professor and Founding Chair of the Department of Computational Medicine and Bioinformatics (DCMB) in the University of Michigan Medical School. He also holds joint professorship in Psychiatry and Internal Medicine.

Athey's career spans over three decades where he's served as principal investigator in National Library of Medicine (NLM) Visible Human Project, the DARPA Telepathology and Virtual Soldier Projects, and the NIH National Center for Integrative Biomedical Informatics (NCIBI). A biophysicist by training, his research is focused on pharmocogenomics. He also co-founded Phenomics Health.

Athey is an elected fellow of the American College of Medical Informatics (FACMI) and to the American Association for the Advancement of Science (FAAAS).
