= Emma Louise Call =

American physician

Emma Louise Call (1847–1937) was an American physician, and one of the first female physicians in the United States. She is one of the namesakes of Call-Exner bodies, a pathognomonic feature of granulosa cell tumors. These tumors are associated with ovarian cancers.

== Biography ==
Call received her MD from the University of Michigan Medical School in 1873, and moved to Vienna as Sigmund Exner's postgraduate student. In 1875, they published the manuscript announcing their findings of the pathology findings - eosinophilic follicles present in ovarian tumors - that would later be named after the two of them. This would be Call's only publication, as she later returned to Boston and practiced clinically as an obstetrician for 40 years. Call would become the first woman to receive membership into the Massachusetts Medical Society in 1884.

"I entered the Medical Department of the University the first year that women were admitted. The first class of women...were naturally the objects of much attention critical or otherwise (especially critical) so that in many ways it was quite an ordeal. I believe that only one of the medical faculty was even moderately in favor of the admission of women, so that it speaks well for their conscientiousness when I say (with possibly one exception) we felt that we had [a] square deal from them all."

With regard to Call's quote, Robert H. Young stated that "Corydon Ford had taught Elizabeth Blackwell at Geneva Medical College and was tolerant of the women students, but not all the professors were so kind. The professor of chemistry, Silas Douglas, did not intervene when the men students stamped their feet and shouted as the women entered the lecture room for the one subject that was taught to mixed classes."
