= University of Michigan Medical School =

Medical School in Ann Arbor, Michigan

Coordinates: 42°17′03.4″N 83°43′57.4″W

- Motto: Artes, Scientia, Veritas
- Type: Public medical school
- Established: 1850; 176 years ago
- Parent institution: University of Michigan
- Affiliations: University of Michigan Medicine
- Dean: Thomas J. Wang, MD
- Students: 1,677 (FA 2023)
- Location: Ann Arbor, Michigan, United States
- Website: medschool.umich.edu

The University of Michigan Medical School is the medical school of the University of Michigan, a public research university in Ann Arbor, Michigan, United States. It was founded in 1850 and is part of the University of Michigan Medicine.

Thomas J. Wang, MD has served as Dean of the school since September 2025.

== History ==
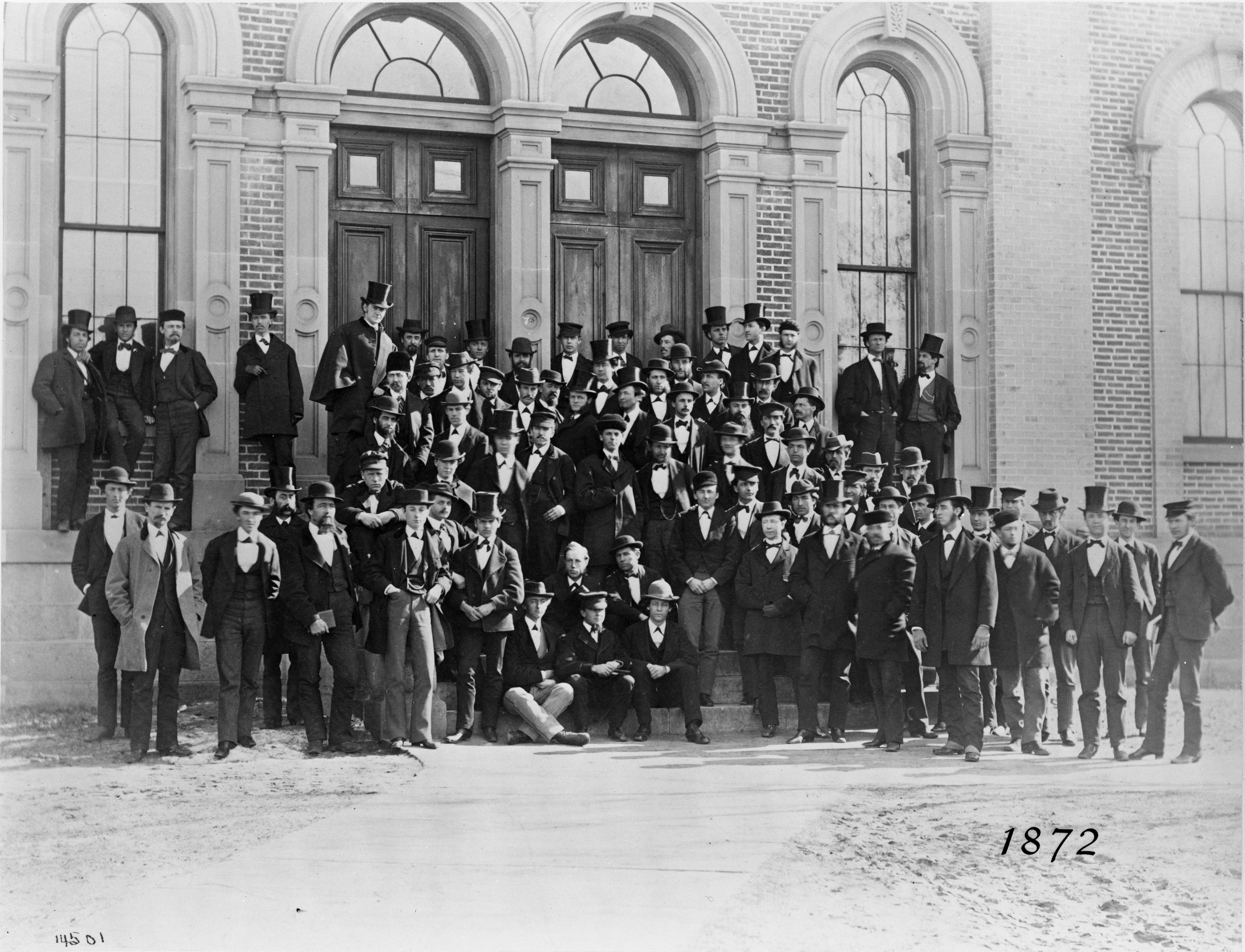
Michigan Medical School Class of 1872

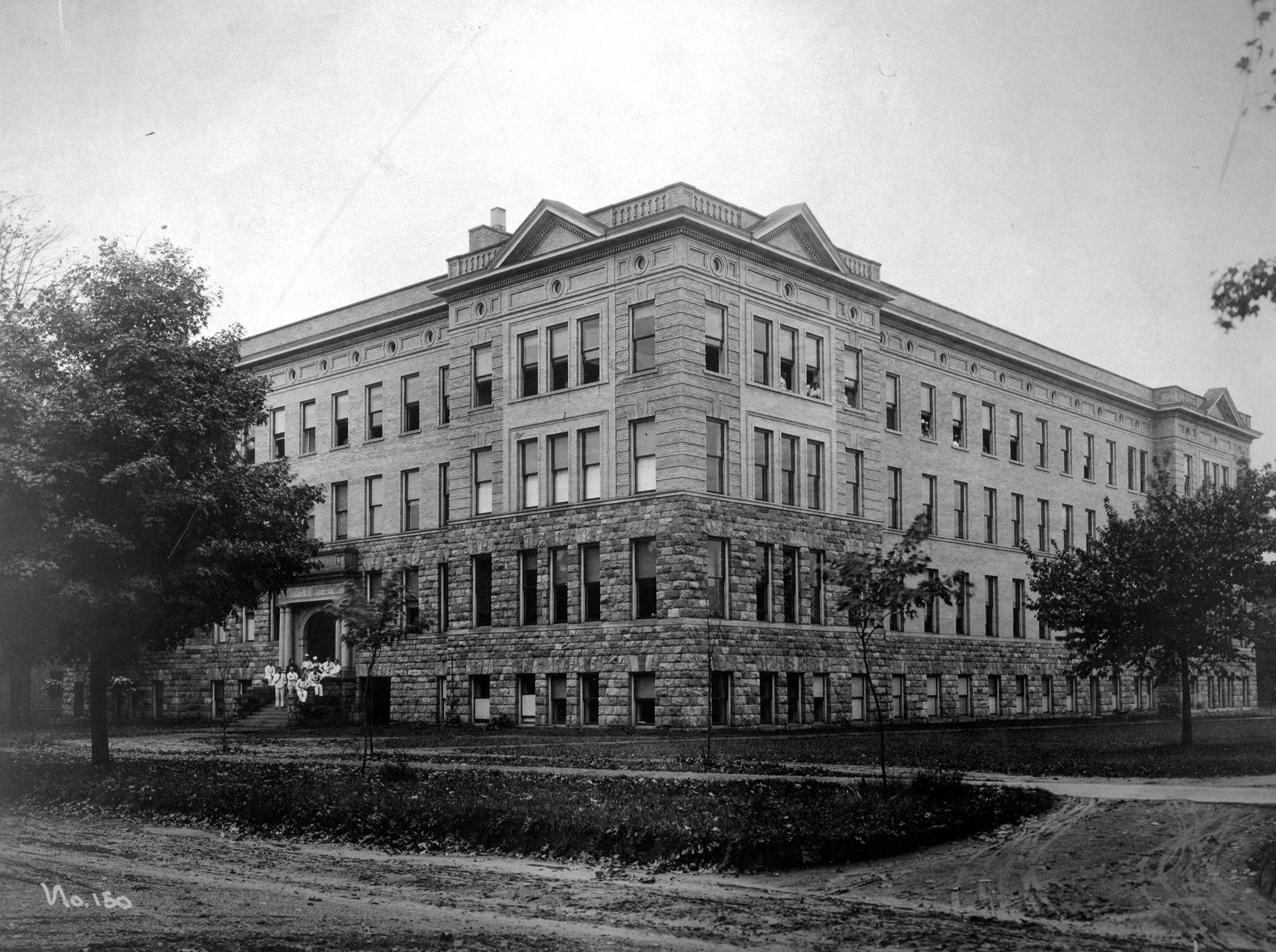
West Medical Building (now Samuel T. Dana Building) in 1955 housed the offices of the Medical School and the laboratories of the departments of Pathology and of Physiological Chemistry. Cornerstone laid on October 15, 1901; building occupied in 1903.

The medical school first opened in 1850, and within two years, it graduated 90 physicians.

The dean of the medical school and the executive vice president for medical affairs were initially two separate roles. In 2016, a new organizational structure merged these positions into one. However, in 2025, the university opted to reinstate the two distinct roles.

== Departments ==
The University of Michigan Medical School consists of the Basic Science Departments and the Clinical Departments.

=== Basic Science Departments ===
The Basic Science Departments consist of the following departments:

- Department of Biological Chemistry
- Department of Biomedical Engineering (with the College of Engineering)
- Department of Cell and Developmental Biology
- Department of Computational Medicine & Bioinformatics
- Department of Human Genetics
- Department of Learning Health Sciences
- Department of Microbiology and Immunology
- Department of Molecular and Integrative Physiology
- Department of Pharmacology

=== Clinical Departments ===
The Clinical Departments consist of the following departments:

- Department of Anesthesiology
- Department of Cardiac Surgery
- Department of Dermatology
- Department of Emergency Medicine
- Department of Family Medicine
- Department of Internal Medicine
- Department of Neurology
- Department of Neurosurgery
- Department of Obstetrics and Gynecology
- Department of Ophthalmology & Visual Sciences
- Department of Orthopaedic Surgery
- Department of Otolaryngology Head & Neck Surgery
- Department of Pathology
- Department of Pediatrics
- Department of Physical Medicine & Rehabilitation
- Department of Psychiatry
- Department of Radiology
- Department of Radiation Oncology
- Department of Surgery
- Department of Urology

== Academics ==
All physicians who are part of the medical school faculty group practice, known as the "U-M Medical Group", hold faculty positions. The medical group has a membership of more than 2,000 physicians and other health professionals practicing in 20 specialties. Patients at many hospitals and clinics in southeastern Michigan also receive University physicians' care through affiliations with other health institutions, including the VA Ann Arbor Healthcare System.

A total of 708 medical students, 1100 house officers (interns/residents), 588 graduate students, and 604 postdoctoral research fellows are currently in training at the medical school, and more than 15,000 practicing physicians and health professionals receive continuing medical education through the medical school's courses each year. In addition to the M.D. program and post-M.D. residency and fellowship Graduate Medical Education programs, the medical school offers master's degree, Ph.D., and post-Ph.D. training in the basic sciences through the Program in Biomedical Sciences (PIBS) and the Rackham Graduate School. The medical school offers accredited residency and fellowship training in 105 disciplines.

The VA Ann Arbor Healthcare System is affiliated with the medical school. All physicians who practice at VA hospital and clinics have U-M faculty appointments as well as VA appointments. Medical students receive training at the VA as part of their internal-medicine rotations but can also receive training for other specialties.

=== Rankings ===
The Medical School's 3,762 faculty provide advanced medical, surgical care, and perform scientific research, while training young doctors and biomedical scientists. As of 2018, 307 chairs are endowed in the medical school. The Medical School is ranked 7th in the nation for primary care training and 15th in the nation among research-oriented schools by U.S. News & World Report and has the nation's 12th highest total of research funding from the National Institutes of Health, with total research funding of more than $593 million in sponsored research awards. The Medical School's research spending accounts for nearly 40 percent of the total for the entire University of Michigan.

== Notable alumni and faculty ==
- John Jacob Abel – "father of pharmacology"; discovered epinephrine and crystallized insulin
- George K. Anderson – U.S. Air Force general
- Brian D. Athey – computational biologist
- Fred Baker – founder of the Scripps Institution of Oceanography
- Robert Bartlett – One of inventors of Extracorporeal membrane oxygenation (ECMO)
- William Henry Beierwaltes – founder of MIBG scan and "father of nuclear medicine"
- Keith Black – neurosurgeon
- David Botstein – geneticist, first argued that the human genome could be mapped
- Edward Bove – congenital heart surgeon, first described hypoplastic left-heart syndrome
- Emma Eliza Bower (1852–1937) – physician, club-woman, and newspaper owner, publisher, editor
- Emma Louise Call – one of nation's first female physicians, and namesake of Call-Exner bodies
- Alexa Canady – the first African-American female neurosurgeon in the country
- Ben Carson – former director of pediatric neurosurgery at Johns Hopkins Hospital, first neurosurgeon to successfully separate conjoined twins
- Stanley Cohen – biochemist, received Nobel Prize in Physiology or Medicine (1986) for his discovery of the epidermal and nerve growth factors
- Francis Collins – director of the NIH Human Genome Project and discoverer of the most common mutation for cystic fibrosis
- Jerome Conn – first described primary hyperaldosteronism – Conn's Syndrome
- Simone Cromer – social media personality
- Elizabeth C. Crosby – neuroanatomist
- James W. Curran – dean at the Rollins School of Public Health, Emory University
- Ronald M. Davis – president of American Medical Association (AMA)
- Mary A. G. Dight – president of the Hempstead Academy of Medicine
- James T. Elder-Kirk D. Wuepper Professor of Molecular Genetic Dermatology and a professor of dermatology
- Thomas Francis – proved the efficacy of the first polio vaccine
- Sanjay Gupta – CNN chief medical correspondent, neurosurgeon
- Alice Hamilton – first woman appointed to the faculty of Harvard University and pioneer in the field of toxicology
- Mary Hawn – chair of surgery at Stanford University and member of the National Academy of Medicine
- H.H. Holmes – one of the first documented American serial killers
- Tomo Inouye – first Japanese woman to graduate from U of M Medical School (in 1901)
- Sophia B. Jones – first black woman to graduate from U of M Medical School (in 1885)
- Ida Kahn – together with Mary Stone, first Asians to graduate from U of M (in 1896)
- Jack Kevorkian – controversial proponent of the legalization of euthanasia
- Josiah K. Lilly Jr. – chairman and president of Eli Lilly and Company
- Julie Lumeng – developmental and behavioral pediatrician, professor, and associate dean for research at Michigan Medicine
- Howard Markel – physician, medical historian, editor, and best-selling author
- William James Mayo – co-founder of the Mayo Clinic
- Karin Muraszko – first woman chair of neurological surgery in the U.S.
- Elizabeth Nabel – cardiologist, director of the National Heart Lung and Blood Institute
- Reed M. Nesbit – urologist, pioneer of transurethral resection of the prostate
- Tsang-gi Ni – physiologist
- Marshall Warren Nirenberg – biochemist, received Nobel Prize in Physiology or Medicine (1968) for the elucidation of how codons are utilized for protein synthesis
- Antonia Novello – first woman and first Hispanic Surgeon General of the United States from 1990 to 1993
- Fannie Almara Quain – first woman born in North Dakota to earn a doctor of medicine degree
- Steven C. Quay, researcher and author
- Melvyn Rubenfire – cardiologist, Director of The Preventive Cardiology Department
- Eric B. Schoomaker – Surgeon General of the United States Army
- Sherman Silber – physician and infertility specialist
- Mary Stone – together with Ida Kahn, first Asians to graduate from U of M (in 1896)
- Homer Stryker – founder of Stryker Corporation.
- William E. Upjohn (MED: MD 1875) (June 15, 1853 – October 18, 1932) – founder and president of Upjohn Pharmaceutical Company.
- Aldred Scott Warthin – pathologist, "father of cancer genetics"

== See also ==
- List of medical schools in the United States
