= University of Michigan Medicine =

Medical center and school in Ann Arbor, Michigan, U.S.

Coordinates: 42°16′55.5″N 83°43′38.4″W

- Other name: Michigan Medicine
- Former name: University of Michigan Health System (1997–2017)
- Motto: Excellence and Leadership in Patient Care, Research and Education
- Type: Public
- Established: 1869 (University Hospital); 1997 (University of Michigan Health System); 2017 (Michigan Medicine)
- Parent institution: University of Michigan
- Endowment: $2.1 billion (2015)
- Head: David C. Miller (CEO)
- Faculty: 3,762
- Administrative staff: 17,546
- Students: 2,018
- Location: Ann Arbor, Michigan, U.S.
- Campus: 128 acres (0.52 km^{2})
- Website: michiganmedicine.org

The University of Michigan Medicine (branded as Michigan Medicine) is the academic medical center of the University of Michigan, a public research university in Ann Arbor, Michigan, United States. It consists of the university's medical school, affiliated hospitals, and affiliated healthcare centers.

== History ==
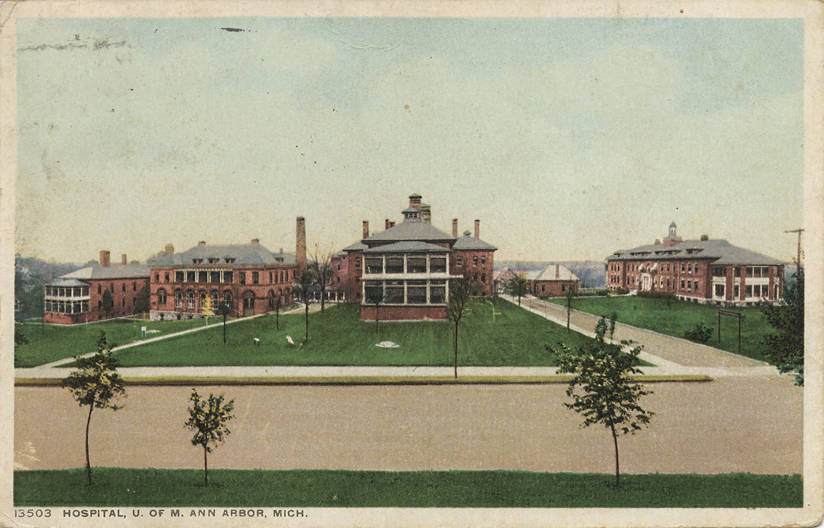
University of Michigan Hospital in the first decade of the 20th century

In 1869 the University of Michigan opened the first hospital in the country owned and operated by a university, in a house in Ann Arbor originally built as a professor's residence. In 1876 a new hospital building was opened adjacent to the old one. At the insistence of the Michigan Legislature, the new building had two separate departments, one for medicine and the other for homeopathy. In 1891 the hospital moved to a set of new buildings away from the university campus, on Catherine Street. The homeopathy department closed in 1921.

In 1925 the university opened a 280,000 square feet (26,000 m^{2}) hospital building at a cost of $3.85 million. It was designed by Albert Kahn and built by Thompson-Starrett Company. In 1986 this building, known as "Old Main," was replaced by a new one farther away, and it was demolished in 1989.

University of Michigan Rogel Cancer Center (formerly Comprehensive Cancer Center) was founded in 1986, and the Cardiovascular Center opened in 2007 on the site of the "Old Main" hospital.

From 1986 to 2006, the health system included M-CARE, a managed-care organization that provided health plans to university faculty, staff, retirees, and dependents and to employees of companies throughout Michigan. In late 2006, it sold M-CARE to Blue Cross Blue Shield of Michigan and its Blue Care Network subsidiary to suffice the need for the health system focused on its core missions of patient care, research, and education.

University of Michigan Health System was renamed "Michigan Medicine" in 2017. In 2021, the clinical activities and enterprise reverted to the name "University of Michigan Health" operating and alongside the academic activities at the University of Michigan Medical School, both under the Michigan Medicine umbrella.

== Overview ==
Michigan Medicine is a high-volume surgical center with a total of 66 operating rooms. The construction of the $523 million Children and Women's Hospital and the $132 million Eye Center expansion added 18 operating rooms to the health system for a total of 82 operating rooms. Outpatient care is provided at the main medical campus in Ann Arbor and at numerous satellite locations.

More than 2.4 million outpatient and emergency visits, 48,000 hospital stays, 54,000 surgeries, and 4,400 births take place each year at facilities operated by Michigan Medicine, including the University Hospital, C.S. Mott Children's Hospital, Women's Hospital and the A. Alfred Taubman Health Care Center on the main medical campus, and at outpatient health centers in multiple communities in southeast Michigan.

Michigan Medicine has around 30,000 employees, including about 3,900 faculty, 6,000 nurses, 1,800 residents and 300 clinical fellows. In all, the Michigan Medicine community accounts for more than half of the entire University of Michigan faculty/staff headcount across all campuses.

The Michigan Visiting Nurses, a part of the Michigan Health Corporation, provides range of home care services in a 13-county area of southeastern Michigan. These include home nursing, specialty treatments, therapy, and palliative care. It also provides public and employer-based immunization services.

As a non-profit entity, Michigan Medicine uses positive operating margins to fund continued advances in patient care, education, research, and the facilities needed to support these functions.

In April 2023, University of Michigan Health finalized a $7 billion merger with Lansing-based Sparrow Health System, expanding its statewide footprint by incorporating more than 200 care sites and several regional hospitals. On April 1, 2024, the acquired system was officially renamed University of Michigan Health-Sparrow.

== Main medical campus ==
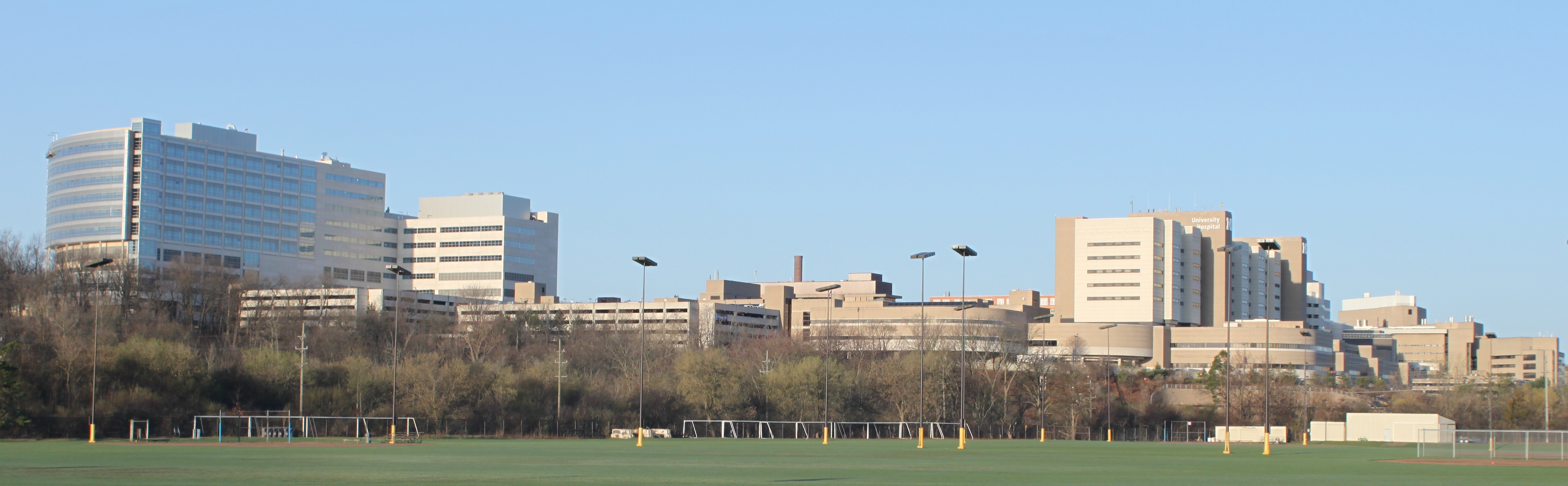
University of Michigan Medical Center

=== University of Michigan Hospital ===
University Hospital is the main hospital for adult patients. It opened in 1986 and has 550 beds. The majority of patients come from outside the Ann Arbor area.

=== D. Dan and Betty Kahn Health Care Pavilion ===
Opened on November 23, 2025, the $920 million Kahn Pavilion is a 12-story, 690,000-square-foot adult inpatient hospital. The facility added 264 private inpatient rooms and 20 operating rooms to the Ann Arbor campus. The pavilion focuses on high-acuity specialty care, including neurosurgery, cardiovascular medicine, and otolaryngology, and connects to the Frankel Cardiovascular Center via an underground tunnel.

=== C. S. Mott Children's and Von Voigtlander Women's Hospital ===
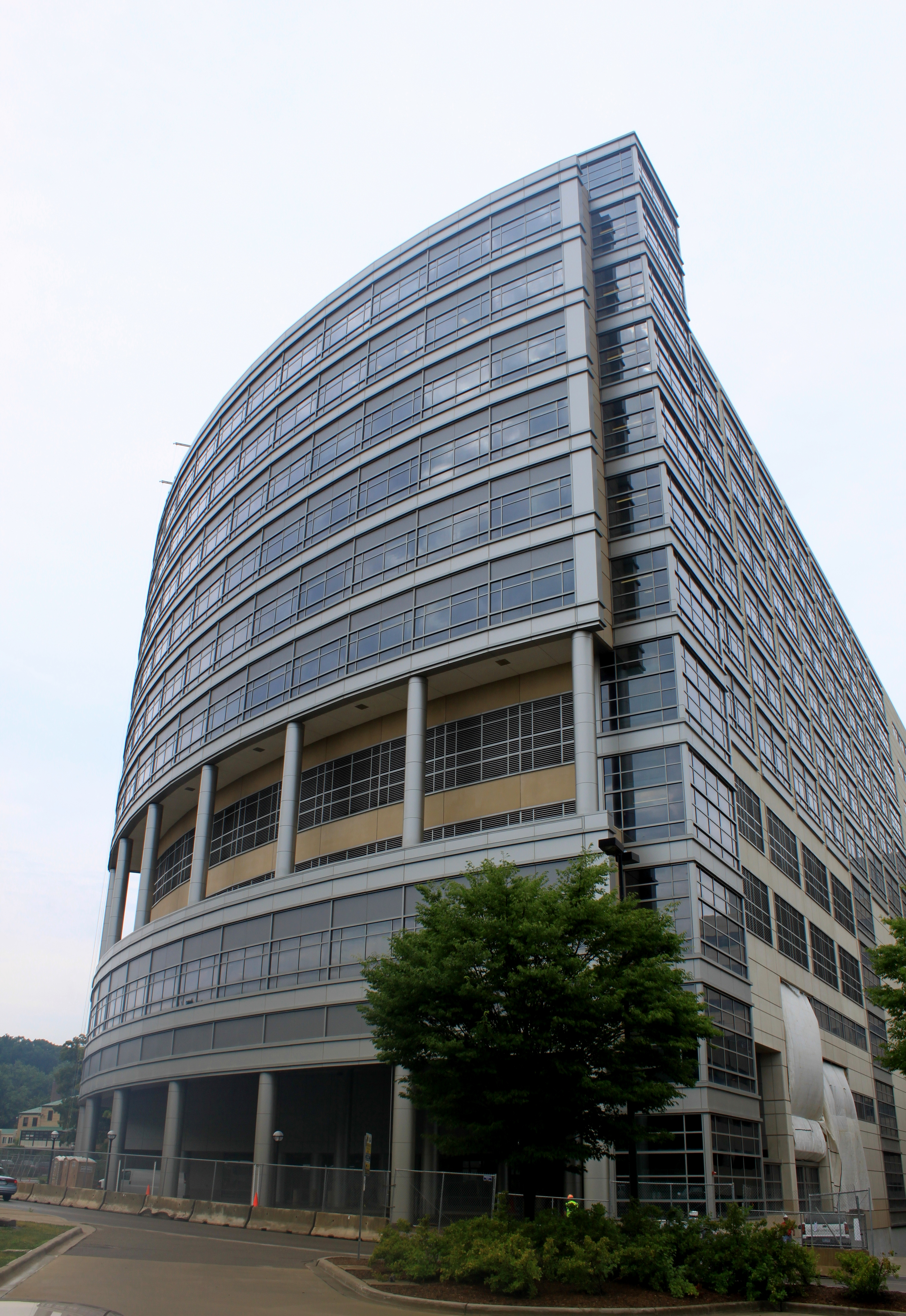
C.S. Mott Children's & Women's Hospital

C.S. Mott Children's Hospital opened in 2011 with 348 beds in the 12-story inpatient tower for children and adolescents including a Child and Adolescent Psychiatry Unit, a 46-bed Neonatal Intensive Care Unit, 12 operating rooms, diagnostic facilities, rehabilitation facilities, a gift shop, indoor and outdoor play areas, a classroom, and a chapel. This facility is attached to a 9-story outpatient clinic.

The new facility for the C. S. Mott Children's and Von Voigtlander Women's Hospital, opened in December 2011 following the completion of a $754 million, five-year construction project. It is one of the largest children's hospitals in the United States. The hospital is 1,100,000 sq ft (100,000 m^{2}) and consists of a 12-story inpatient wing and a nine-story outpatient wing. There are 348 beds, including 50 maternity rooms and 46 neonatal intensive care unit (NICU) rooms. The expansion increases the number of beds at the hospital by 75 percent and makes the hospital the largest of Michigan's three children's hospitals. Every inpatient room is private, in contrast to the old facility, which had mostly double occupancy rooms. The new hospital has 16 operating rooms and two interventional radiology rooms. The first Women's Hospital opened in 1950, while the original C.S. Mott Children's Hospital opened in 1969 and traces its origin to a small ward for sick children that began in 1903.

The new hospital was the most expensive building project in University of Michigan history and one of the most expensive construction projects in state history. Of the $754 million cost, the university financed $588 million through tax-exempt bonds, $91 million through cash reserves from hospital operations, and $75 million through fundraising.

The C. S. Mott Children's and Von Voigtlander Women's Hospital employs about 4,000 people and is gradually hiring 500 more now that the hospital expansion is complete.

=== Rogel Cancer Center ===
Rogel Cancer Center (formerly Comprehensive Cancer Center) was founded in 1986 and includes cancer research and clinical care. The cancer center building opened in 1997. Its nine-stories contain four floors dedicated to outpatient cancer care for adults and children, six floors for cancer research laboratories. The facility also features 77 clinic rooms, 42 chemotherapy infusion suites, 7 procedure rooms, 2 outpatient surgical suites, Mohs skin cancer unit, patient education center, cancer survivor art gallery. In 2006, the center received $82.5 million in research funding, making it the seventh in the United States in the number of National Cancer Institute (NCI) research awards. It is one of 51 programs in the country to earn the NCI's "comprehensive" designation and one of 28 centers in the National Comprehensive Cancer Network.

=== Cardiovascular Center ===
Samuel and Jean Frankel Cardiovascular Center is a 350,000-square-foot (33,000 m^{2}) building that opened in 2007. It "includes a 24-bed surgical post-procedure ICU, 24 vascular general/moderate care beds, nine cardiac procedure rooms, four cardiac surgery operating rooms, two vascular surgery operating rooms, two general thoracic operating rooms, two endovascular procedure labs and 36 clinic exam rooms."

=== W.K. Kellogg Eye Center and Brehm Center for Diabetes Research ===
The W.K. Kellogg Eye Center is the home of the University of Michigan Department of Ophthalmology and Visual Sciences, part of the Medical School and Michigan Medicine. The Kellogg Eye Center has 64 clinical faculty and 21 research faculty (including nine endowed professorships), 21 residents, 17 research fellows and 11 clinical fellows. The Department of Ophthalmology was established in 1872 and has served patients at least as early as 1904, when there were 1,400 patient visits to the Eye & Ear Ward. The Kellogg Eye Center opened in 1985; in that year, there were 36,852 visits to the center. In 2011, there were 140,104 patient visits and over 5,783 surgical procedures performed. The Kellogg Eye Center has community clinics in Ann Arbor, Brighton, Canton, Livonia, Milford, West Bloomfield, and Ypsilanti. Eye Center residents also staff the VA Ophthalmology Clinic at the Veterans Affairs Hospital in Ann Arbor.

The expanded W.K. Kellogg Eye Center and new Brehm Center for Diabetes Research opened in March 2010. The $132 million expansion project built the Brehm Tower, an eight-story 230,000 sq ft (21,000 m^{2}) research and clinical building expands space for the Kellogg Eye Center by 50 percent. The Eye Center is located on the tower's six lower floors, and the Brehm Center is housed on the upper two floors, with its Diabetes mellitus type 1 research laboratories. (Diabetes can cause vision loss). The tower includes nine eye clinics, six operating rooms, and new refractive surgery and cosmetic surgery suites, as well as facilities for support services such as genetic counseling, ophthalmic photography, diagnostic visual electrophysiological testing, and ocular prosthetics. The tower also houses a library, optical shop, and café. The Eye Center has 20 research laboratories in the new building and in the adjoining research tower.

The tower is named after Virginia philanthropists Delores S. (Dee) and William K. Brehm, who donated $44 million to the university in November 2004, of which around $30 million was dedicated for the Brehm Tower project.

=== Biomedical Science Research Building ===
The A. Alfred Taubman Biomedical Science Research Building (BSRB) at 109 Zina Pitcher Place houses biomedical research facilities. The BSRB opened in February 2006 and is around 472,000 sq ft (43,900 m^{2}) The $220 million building occupies a site 415 ft (126 m) by 200 ft (61 m) and is 100 ft (30 m) high. It is the largest research facility on campus and covers an entire city block. The design has been described as "striking...emphasizing light and curves," with its south wall being a "curved, glass ribbon of office space, which is separated from the terra cotta- and metal-clad laboratory areas by a sky-lit atrium." The building won a 2007 AIA Honor Award for architecture.

The building contains six levels, including two partial levels, of research laboratories and offices, and features a basement, a two-level vivarium space that includes an imaging core, surgery, behavioral testing suite, aquatics suite, and cage/rack washing facilities. It houses 144 faculty offices; 1,600 sq ft (150 m^{2}) of divisible seminar room and break-out area; 16,000 sq ft (1,500 m^{2}) of linear equipment space; alcoves for tissue culture, fume hoods, general bench space and lab entries. The 240 lab modules in the building are grouped into six "neighborhoods" for geriatrics and biogerontology; immunology; cardiovascular science; cellular and molecular therapeutics; organogenesis; and neuroscience). The grouping of lab modules by scientific themes is a departure from traditional groupings by department. The facility is also home of the internationally renowned Center for Organogenesis and U-M Program for Neurology Research and Discovery (P-FUND).

Construction planning by the New York City-based architectural firm of Polshek Partnership Architects began in 2001, with final design approval in 2002 and groundbreaking in April 2003. The BSRB was named in honor of A. Alfred Taubman, the university's largest individual donor.

Within the building is the 300-seat Kahn Auditorium, named for philanthropists D. Dan and Betty Kahn of Bloomfield Hills, who gave $6 million to the university for cardiovascular research. The auditorium is sometimes called "The Pringle" because of its resemblance to the brand of potato chips.

=== Life Sciences Institute ===
The Life Sciences Institute, an interdisciplinary life science research institute that conducts scientific research, is not officially part of Michigan Medicine, but many of its faculty have joint appointments in the Medical School.

LSI consists of three centers: The Center for Chemical Genomics (chemical genetics), Center for Stem Cell Biology (stem cell research), and Center for Structural Biology (structural biology). LSI also have several scientific cores: The DNA Sequencing Core (DNA sequencing), the Flow Cytometry Core (flow cytometry), the Functional Genomic Core (functional genomics), the Metabolic Phenotyping Core, the Vivarium (36,000 sq ft (3,300 m^{2}) for small animals and fish), the NMR Suite (nuclear magnetic resonance), and the Cryo-Electron Microscopy Laboratory (cryo-electron microscopy). In 2007, the Life Sciences Institute entered into a research partnership with Weizmann Institute of Science in Israel.

=== Medical Science Research Buildings ===
The three Medical Science Research Buildings, designated MSRB I, MSRB II and MSRB III, opened respectively in 1986, 1989, and 1995. They are home to basic research laboratories and shared "core" facilities for U-M biomedical researchers. MSRB I became home to the Howard Hughes Medical Institute (HHMI) offices at the University of Michigan after the university was chosen to be one of 12 HHMI sites in the country in 2008.

== North Campus Research Complex ==
In 2009, the University of Michigan acquired the 174-acre (0.70 km^{2}) former Pfizer facility with 28-buildings and created the North Campus Research Complex. The complex was adjacent to the North Campus and occupied land that the university sold to pharmaceutical manufacturer Parke-Davis in 1957. In 1970 Warner-Lambert acquired Parke-Davis and in 2000 it was purchased by Pfizer.

After a strategic planning process, the first U-M employees moved to NCRC in spring 2010, occupying administrative space. One year later, the first laboratory researchers moved into former Pfizer research space. By early 2013, 2,000 faculty and staff were stationed at the site. By 2017, a decade after Pfizer announced its intention to leave the facility, U-M had 2,200 faculty and staff, and more than 600 students, based at the facility.

The acquisition of the site spurred the development of several new interdisciplinary research institutes. The Institute for Healthcare Policy and Innovation, created in 2011, brings together more than 500 faculty from many areas of U-M, who perform health services research to study and improve the delivery, quality, safety, oversight and economics of healthcare. The Biointerfaces Institute, created in 2012, and the Michigan Institute for Research in Critical Care, created in 2013, both bring together researchers from diverse fields.

In summer 2018, several former Pfizer buildings on the southern portion of the NCRC campus were reopened as the home to most of Michigan Medicine's clinical pathology operations, serving inpatient and outpatient facilities run by Michigan Medicine as well as clients of the MLabs service from other hospitals and health systems both state and nationwide. Also at this time, construction work began on a major renovation of two buildings at NCRC to create 158,000 square feet of new Medical School research laboratory space.

== Ann Arbor satellite facilities ==
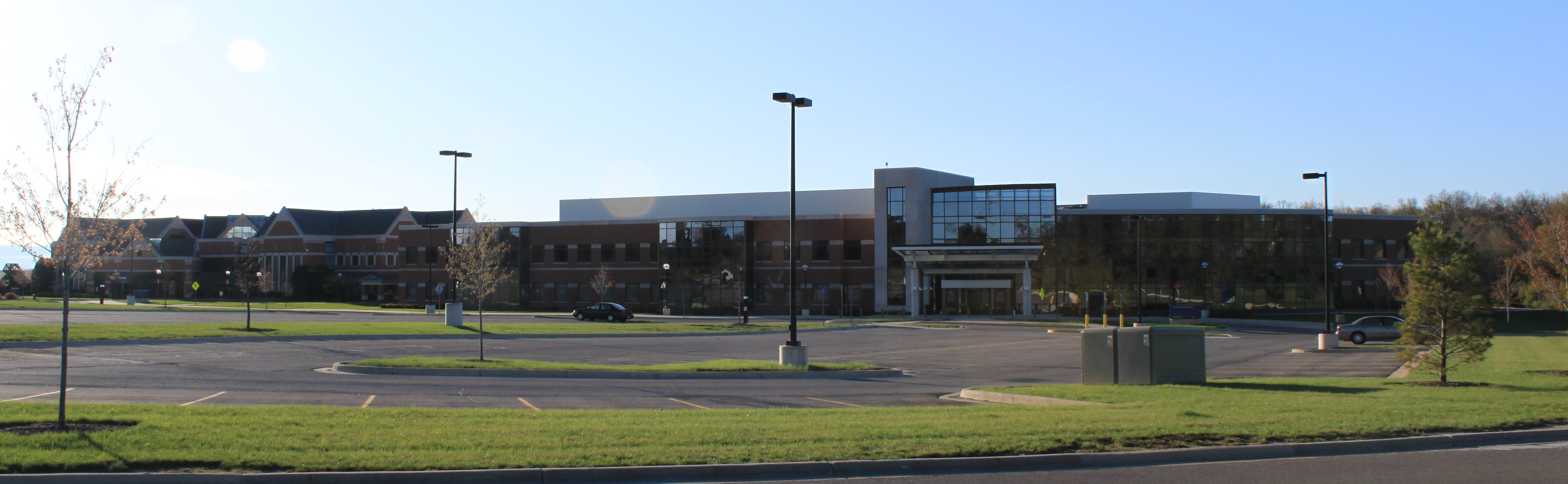
UMHS East Campus

- The East Ann Arbor Health and Geriatrics Center opened in 1996 northeast of Ann Arbor and houses outpatient clinics for general internal medicine, general pediatrics, obstetrics & gynecology, and the primary and specialty care services of the Turner Geriatric Clinic.
- The Rachel Upjohn Building, adjacent to the Health and Geriatrics Center on the East Ann Arbor Medical Campus, opened in 2006 and combines all outpatient psychiatric and substance abuse care for adults and children into one facility. The 112,000 square feet (10,400 m^{2}) building houses 335 offices/outpatient treatment rooms, a 120-seat auditorium and two telemedicine offices to assist patients living in remote areas as well as space for the research, education, and administrative programs of the U-M Depression Center, a library and art gallery. The facility is named for Rachel Mary (Upjohn) Meader, who with her husband Edwin gave $10 million toward the building's construction. The facility also is home to:
  - Sleep Research Center
  - MRI Simulator
  - Brain Imaging Center
  - Stress and Neuroendocrine Program
- The Ice Cube houses the Sports Medicine Program in a facility southwest of Ann Arbor. The program was established by Gerald A. O'Connor, professor of Orthopaedic Surgery at U-M and past president of the American Orthopaedic Society for Sports Medicine, and is operated by the Sports Medicine Division of Orthopedic Surgery. The program is one of the premier Sports Medicine programs in the country and attracts patients from across the US. MedSport Physicians serve as the team physicians for the U-M Athletic Department and several area high school sports teams.
- The East Ann Arbor Ambulatory Surgery and Medical Procedures Center, located near Geriatrics and Depression centers, opened in 2006. The $30 million outpatient surgical facility houses six operating rooms and four medical procedure suites. The facility help meet the increasing demand for U-M outpatient surgical services.
- The West Ann Arbor Health Center – Parkland Plaza opened in November 2017, replacing the former West Ann Arbor Health Center that had been located in a smaller facility nearby. Officially located in Scio Township, which neighbors Ann Arbor, the center is located on land donated to the university in 2010, and offers care in 27 adult and pediatric specialties. Spanning 75,000 square feet, it has 86 exam rooms, four ambulatory diagnostic and treatment unit rooms, 12 infusion bays and radiology services.
- Other locations in Ann Arbor include several leased facilities in the vicinity of Briarwood Mall, an Orthotics & Prosthetics Center, a Spine Program facility, and other facilities in the community.

== Other satellite facilities ==
In addition to the above, UMHS operates outpatient surgery and health centers in other areas of Ann Arbor, as well as the neighboring communities of Brighton, Canton, Chelsea, Dexter, Howell, Livonia, Northville, Saline and Ypsilanti. A new Brighton health center, with 297,000 square feet of space housing 50 adult and pediatric specialties and related services, opened in September 2018; it is the largest U-M medical facility outside the main medical campus. U-M emergency medicine physicians staff the emergency rooms at several local hospitals, and U-M physicians provide specialized services at other hospitals for patients with specific cardiovascular issues, cancer and other diseases.

- Outreach clinics – Among the clinics that UMHS operates alone or in conjunction with other entities are the New Hope Outreach Clinic operated by the Geriatrics Center at the New Hope Baptist Church in Ann Arbor, and the Regional Alliance for Healthy Schools clinics for low-income children and teens in Ann Arbor, Flint and Ypsilanti. The Medical School's students and faculty operate a weekly Student Run Free Clinic in Pinckney, Michigan.
- The VA Ann Arbor Health Care System opened in 1953 and underwent $150 million expansion in 1998. The 145-bed facility houses a surgical suite containing 9 operating rooms. In 2011, the facility conducted 455,000 outpatient visits to veterans in 15 Michigan counties and portions of Indiana, northern Ohio. The hospital has an annual research budget of $10.6 million and all physicians are faculty of U-M Medical School.
  - Center for Clinical Management Research, housed at the U-M North Campus Research Complex, evaluates outcomes of alternative treatments and monitors quality measures
  - Serves as Research Coordinating Center for the national Quality Enhancement Research Initiative - Diabetes Mellitus (QUERI-DM)
  - Home to Center for Bioethics and Social Sciences in Medicine (CBBSM), a collaboration with U-M Medical School
  - Home to the Patient Safety Enhancement Program, a collaboration with the U-M Medical School

== Survival Flight ==
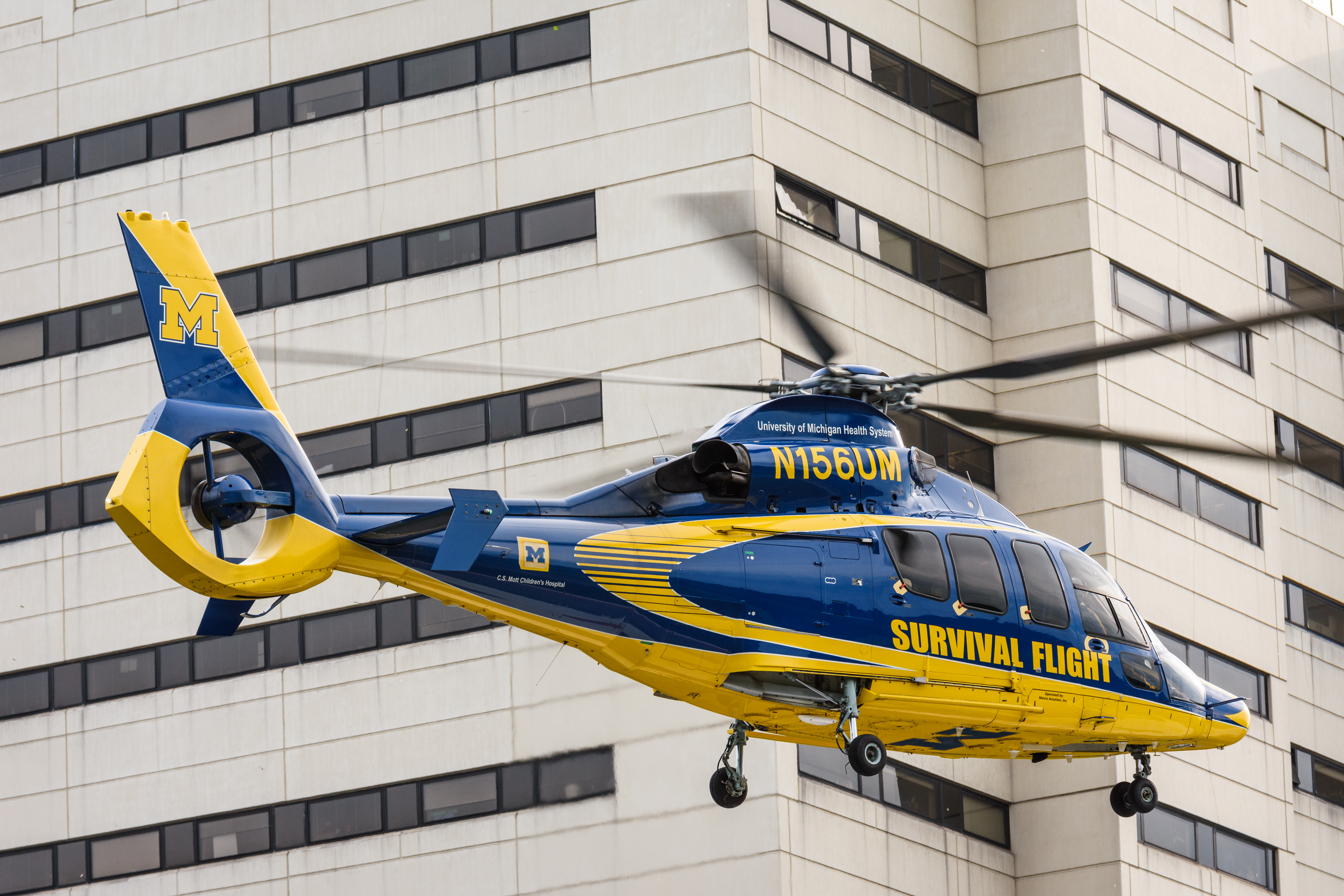
Survival Flight EC155 Helicopter

In 1983 UMHS established Survival Flight, the first of its kind in the state. The service operates three American Eurocopter EC155 B1 helicopters and one Bombardier Learjet 75 fixed-wing, twin-engine jet. For its first ten years, the service flew American Eurocopter AS355 Twinstar craft, which were replaced in 1993 with Bell 230 craft that remained in service for five years, until they were replaced in 1998 with Bell 430 craft. From 2012 to the present, the service has used three Eurocopter EC-155.

The four aircraft make 1000 to 1500 trips annually and have a range of over 400 mi (640 km) from the U-M campus. The flights transport 800 to 1000 patients per year with the remainder of the trips for the transport of human organs. The jet also transported victims of the 2010 Haiti earthquake for treatment in the United States. In addition to its main helipad on the U-M medical campus, Survival Flight operates out of Livingston County Airport, in a hangar that it shares with Livingston County EMS.

Survival Flight has an excellent safety record and intense maintenance program. The aero-medical aviation sector has a high accident rate per hours flown due to its requirement to operate in almost all weather conditions and due to urgent transportation needs. Survival Flight has only suffered one crew and equipment loss. On June 4, 2007, a Cessna 550 Citation II provided by Marlin Air, Inc. plunged into Lake Michigan after experiencing a "trim runaway" problem. In September 2008, a legal settlement was reached between University of Michigan and Marlin Air, Inc. after a lawsuit was filed because the university terminated its contract for air medical transportation services. Results of the NTSB investigation placed blame on the deficiencies and inadequate checkrides instituted by the chief pilot of Marlin Air, Inc., cited an "ill-prepared pilot in the first officer's seat," and also placed blame on the FAA's inability to detect such training and operational deficiencies. In 2009, Survival Flight once again began to operate fixed-wing service in a new Cessna Citation Encore out of KPTK airport in Waterford Township, Michigan and in 2013 moved fixed-wing operations to KOZW airport in Howell, Michigan.

== Rankings ==
For 18 consecutive years through 2012, and again in 2016, 2017 and 2018, UMHS/Michigan Medicine was named to the "Honor Roll of America's Best Hospitals" compiled by U.S. News & World Report magazine. In 2018, U.S. News & World Report ranked UMHS 5th in its adult hospital honor roll and recognized it in 14 adult and 10 pediatric areas of specialized care. The University of Michigan Health System ranks among the top 10 hospitals in the nation in Ear, Nose, and Throat (Otolaryngology) (#1), Gynecology (#2), Pulmonology (#5, 2-way tie), Urology (#5), Gastroenterology and GI surgery (#6), Geriatrics (#7), Nephrology (#8), Heart (cardiology) and Heart Surgery; (#8, 2-way tie), Ophthalmology (#8), and Neurology and Neurosurgery; (#9).

== Affiliations with other organizations ==
To address the changing environment under health-care reform, the Michigan Medicine has developed affiliations with other regional, health systems.

- In May 2012, the UMHS and Trinity Health, headquartered in Livonia, Michigan, signed a master, affiliation agreement promoting close cooperation between the two health systems and prioritizing University of Michigan hospitals as Trinity Health's academic partner.
- In August 2012, the UMHS announced that it was negotiating with MidMichigan Health to acquire a minority-ownership position in the four-hospital, health system headquartered in Midland, Michigan. The partnership was finalized in June 2013.
- In 2013, the UMHS joined eight physician groups across Michigan to launch POM-ACO, an accountable care organization under the Medicare Shared Savings Program. In 2014, the members of the UMHS faculty group practice joined POM-ACO. The ACO has more than 6,000 providers across Michigan. In 2017, POM-ACO saved the Medicare system $45.5 million and was the fourth-largest MSSP ACO in the nation as well as the largest in Michigan.
- In December 2016, the UMHS and Metro Health Hospital, based in Grand Rapids, Michigan, launched an affiliation. Metro Health officially changed its name to the University of Michigan Health-West to mark its 15th-anniversary affiliation in 2021.
- In April 2023, University of Michigan Health finalized a $7 billion merger with Sparrow Health System based in Lansing, Michigan. In April 2024, the acquired system was officially renamed University of Michigan Health-Sparrow.

== Major projects in development ==
Three major projects have been completed and opened for use, completed in late 2017 and 2018:

- A multispeciality health center in Brighton, Michigan (complementing existing services in the area)
- A multispecialty health center west of Ann Arbor, Michigan
- A clinical pathology project to move many clinical operations to the North Campus Research Complex
