= List of University of Michigan faculty and staff =

As of the fall of 2023, the University of Michigan employs 8,189 faculty members at the Ann Arbor campus, including 44 living members of the National Academy of Sciences, 63 living members of the National Academy of Medicine, 28 living members of the National Academy of Engineering, 98 living members of the American Academy of Arts and Sciences, 17 living members of the American Philosophical Society, and 129 Sloan Research Fellows.

The Ann Arbor campus's faculty comprises 3,195 tenured and tenure-track faculty, 72 faculty classified as "instructional not-on-track" faculty, 1,157 faculty classified as lecturers, 2,525 regular clinical instructional faculty, and 220 supplemental faculty, and 117 emeritus/a faculty; additionally, there are 871 faculty members serving as research faculty, librarians, curators, or archivists.

The university employs 18,422 regular and 5,745 supplemental staff members at its Ann Arbor campus, and another 20,158 regular and 1,317 supplemental staff members at its hospital. Supplemental staff counts included 4,476 job titles held by students, including graduate student instructor, research assistant, and staff assistant positions.

== Current faculty ==
=== A. Alfred Taubman College of Architecture & Urban Planning ===
- Malcolm McCullough (2001–), professor of architecture
- Mania Aghaei Meibodi (2023–), assistant professor of architecture

=== College of Engineering ===
==== Aerospace Engineering ====
- Joaquim Martins (2009–), Pauline M. Sherman Collegiate Professor of Aerospace Engineering

==== Biomedical Engineering ====
- Cynthia Chestek (2012–), professor of Biomedical Engineering
- Mary-Ann Mycek (2003–), William and Valerie Hall Department Chair of Biomedical Engineering
- Douglas Noll (1998–), professor of Biomedical Engineering and Radiology
- Zhen Xu (2005–), Li Ka Shing Endowed Professor of Biomedical Engineering

==== Chemical Engineering ====
- Sharon Glotzer (2001–), Stuart W. Churchill Professor of Chemical Engineering; professor of Materials Science & Engineering, Physics, Applied Physics and Macromolecular Science and Engineering
- Ronald G. Larson (1996–), George Granger Brown Professor of Chemical Engineering

==== Civil and Environmental Engineering ====
- Lutgarde Raskin (2005–), Altarum/ERIM Russell O’Neal Professor and Vernon L. Snoeyink Distinguished University Professor

==== Climate and Space Sciences and Engineering ====
- Sushil Atreya (1974–), professor of atmospheric and space sciences; director of the Planetary Science Laboratory
- Nilton de Oliveira Rennó, professor

==== Electrical Engineering and Computer Science (EECS) - Computer Science and Engineering (CSE) ====
- Valeria Bertacco (2003–), professor of Electrical Engineering and Computer Science; Vice Provost for Engaged Learning (2019–)
- Mark Guzdial (2018–), professor of Computer Science and Engineering
- J. Alex Halderman (2009–), Bredt Family Professor of Engineering
- H. V. Jagadish (2002–), Bernard A Galler Collegiate Professor of Electrical Engineering and Computer Science
- Scott Mahlke (2001–), professor of Electrical Engineering and Computer Science
- Jason Mars (2013–), associate professor of Computer Science and Engineering; conversational AI researcher, founder of ClincAI
- Z. Morley Mao (2004–), professor of Computer Science and Engineering
- Rada Mihalcea (2013–), Janice M. Jenkins Collegiate Professor of Computer Science and Engineering
- Emily Mower Provost (2012–), professor and senior associate chair in Computer Science and Engineering
- Karem A. Sakallah (1988–), professor of Computer Science and Engineering
- Kang G. Shin (2002–), Kevin and Nancy O'Connor Professor of Computer Science; founding director of the Real-Time Computing Laboratory
- Michael Wellman (1992–), professor of Electrical Engineering and Computer Science

==== Electrical Engineering and Computer Science (EECS) - Electrical and Computer Engineering (ECE) ====
- Ehsan Afshari (2016–), professor of Electrical and Computer Engineering
- David Theodore Blaauw (2001–), Kensall D. Wise Collegiate Professor of Electrical Engineering and Computer Science
- Cynthia Finelli (2003–), David C. Munson, Jr. Professor of Engineering
- Stephen Forrest (2006–), Peter A. Franken Distinguished University Professor of Engineering
- Anthony Grbic (2006–), John L. Tishman Professor of Engineering
- Mingyan Liu (2000–), Alice L. Hunt Collegiate Professor of Engineering; Associate Dean for Academic Affairs
- Kamal Sarabandi (2002–), Rufus S. Teesdale Professor of Engineering, director of Radiation Laboratory, Department of Electrical Entering and Computer Science
- Leung Tsang (2015–), Robert J. Hiller Professor of Engineering
- Louise Willingale (2008–), associate professor of Electrical and Computer Science
- Herbert Winful (1987–), Joseph E. and Ann P. Rowe Professor of Electrical Engineering; professor of Electrical Engineering & Computer Science

==== Industrial & Operations Engineering ====
- Don Chaffin (1969–), Richard G. Snyder Distinguished University Professor Emeritus
- Nadine Sarter (2004–), Richard W. Pew Collegiate Professor Emeritus

==== Materials Science & Engineering ====
- Rachel Goldman (1997–), professor of Materials Science and Engineering
- Elizabeth A. Holm (2023–), chair; Richard F. and Eleanor A. Towner Professor of Engineering

==== Mechanical Engineering ====
- Ellen Arruda (1992–), Maria Comninou Collegiate Professor of Mechanical Engineering and Tim Manganello / Borg Warner Department Chair of Mechanical Engineering
- Diann Brei (2002–), professor of Mechanical Engineering
- Yoram Koren (1986–), James J. Duderstadt University Professor of Manufacturing; Paul G. Goebel Professor of Mechanical Engineering
- Chinedum Okwudire (2011–), professor of Mechanical Engineering
- Panos Papalambros (1979–), Donald C. Graham Professor Emeritus of Engineering
- Elliott J. Rouse (2017–), associate professor of Mechanical Engineering; associate professor of Robotics
- Anna Stefanopoulou (2000–), William Clay Ford Professor of Technology
- A. Galip Ulsoy (1980–), C.D. Mote Jr. Distinguished University Professor Emeritus of Mechanical Engineering and the William Clay Ford Professor Emeritus of Manufacturing; co-inventor of the Reconfigurable Manufacturing System; deputy director of the NSF Engineering Research Center for Reconfigurable Manufacturing Systems
- Angela Violi (2006–), professor of Mechanical Engineering
- Kon-Well Wang (2008–), Stephen P. Timoshenko Collegiate Professor of Mechanical Engineering
- Margaret Wooldridge (1998–), professor of Mechanical Engineering

==== Naval Architecture and Marine Engineering ====
- Jing Sun (2003–), Michael G. Parsons Collegiate Professor of Naval Architecture and Marine Engineering
- Donald C. Winter (2010–), adjunct clinical professor of Naval Architecture and Marine Engineering, College of Engineering

==== Nuclear Engineering & Radiological Sciences ====
- Ronald Gilgenbach (1980–), professor emeritus
- Kimberlee Kearfott (1993–), professor of Nuclear Engineering and Radiological Sciences
- Carolyn Kuranz (2009–), associate professor
- Sara Pozzi (2008–), professor of Nuclear Engineering and Radiological Sciences

==== Radiation Laboratory (Radlab) ====
- Fawwaz Ulaby (1984–), Emmett Leith Distinguished University Professor of EECS

==== Robotics ====
- Jason J. Corso (2014–), professor of Electrical Engineering and Computer Science
- Robert D. Gregg (2019–), associate professor of Robotics
- Jessy W. Grizzle (1987–), Elmer G. Gilbert Distinguished University Professor; Jerry W. and Carol L. Levin Professor of Engineering
- Odest Chadwicke Jenkins (2015–), professor of Robotics
- Dawn Tilbury (1995–), Ronald D. and Regina C. McNeil Department Chair of Robotics; Herrick Professor of Engineering

=== School for Environment and Sustainability ===
- Arun Agrawal, Samuel Trask Dana Professor
- Rosina Bierbaum, professor of Natural Resources and Environmental Policy
- Andrew Hoffman, an expert in environmental pollution and sustainable enterprise; Holcim (US) Professor of Sustainable Enterprise
- Maria Carmen Lemos, professor; associate dean for research and engagement
- Jonathan Overpeck, William B. Stapp Collegiate Professor of Environmental Education
- Ivette Perfecto, Bunyan Bryant Collegiate Professor of Environmental Justice

=== School of Information ===
- Daniel E. Atkins, professor emeritus of Information
- Elizabeth Yakel, professor and senior associate dean for academic affairs, specializing in digital archives and digital preservation

=== Institute for Social Research ===
- Vincent Hutchings, Hanes Walton Jr. Collegiate Professor of Political Science
- Donald R. Kinder, Philip E. Converse Professor

=== Law School ===
- Theodore J. St. Antoine, James E. and Sarah A. Degan Professor Emeritus of Law; labor arbitrator
- Reuven Avi-Yonah, Irwin I. Cohn Professor of Law
- Karima Bennoune, Lewis M. Simes Professor of Law
- Rebecca S. Eisenberg, Robert and Barbara Luciano Professor of Law
- Daniel Halberstam, Eric Stein Collegiate Professor of Law
- James R. Hines Jr., L. Hart Wright Collegiate Professor of Law
- Ellen D. Katz, Ralph W. Aigler Professor of Law
- Vikramaditya Khanna, William W. Cook Professor of Law
- Jessica Litman, John F. Nickoll Professor of Law
- Leah Litman, professor of Law
- Kyle D. Logue, Douglas A. Kahn Collegiate Professor of Law
- Catharine MacKinnon, Elizabeth A. Long Professor of Law; feminist legal theorist
- William Ian Miller, Thomas G. Long Professor of Law; author of The Anatomy of Disgust
- Aaron Perzanowski, Thomas W. Lacchia Professor of Law
- John A. E. Pottow, John Philip Dawson Collegiate Professor of Law
- Richard Primus, Theodore J. St. Antoine Collegiate Professor of Law
- Steven R. Ratner, Bruno Simma Collegiate Professor of Law
- Rebecca J. Scott, Charles Gibson Distinguished University Professor of History and Professor of Law
- Ekow Yankah, Thomas M. Cooley Professor of Law

=== Life Sciences Institute ===
- Roger D. Cone (2016–), Mary Sue Coleman Director of the Life Sciences Institute; vice provost for the Biosciences Initiative (2017–)
- Janet L. Smith, Rita Willis Professor of the Life Sciences and Center for Structural Biology Faculty director

=== College of Literature, Science, and the Arts ===
==== Afroamerican and African Studies ====
- Angela D. Dillard (2009–), Earl Lewis Professor of Afroamerican and African Studies; vice provost for Undergraduate Education (2024–)

==== American Culture ====
- Kristin Ann Hass, professor in the Department of American Culture

==== Anthropology ====
- Ruth Behar, professor
- Kent Flannery, James B. Griffin Distinguished University Professor of Anthropological Archaeology
- Judith Irvine, Edward Sapir Distinguished University Professor
- Conrad Phillip Kottak, professor emeritus of Anthropology
- Joyce Marcus, professor of anthropology
- Erik Mueggler, Katherine Verdery Collegiate Professor of Anthropology
- Milford Wolpoff, professor of anthropology
- Henry Wright, professor of anthropology

==== Asian Languages and Cultures ====
- Donald S. Lopez Jr., Arthur E. Link Distinguished university professor of Buddhist and Tibetan Studies

==== Astronomy ====
- Edwin Bergin, professor of Astronomy
- Nuria Calvet, Helen Dodson Prince Collegiate Professor of Astronomy
- Sally Oey, professor

==== Chemistry ====
- Julie Biteen (2010–), Janine Maddock Collegiate Professor of Chemistry and of Biophysics; Margaret Oakley Dayhoff Award winner (2017)
- Charles L. Brooks III (2008–), Cyrus Levinthal Distinguished University Professor of Chemistry and Biophysics; Warner-Lambert/Parke-Davis Professor of Chemistry; Thomson Reuters Top 100 Chemists of 2000–2010; Sloan Foundation Fellow (1992)
- Brian Coppola (1986–), professor of Chemistry
- Theodore Goodson III (2004–), Richard Barry Bernstein Collegiate Professor of Chemistry and Macromolecular Science and Engineering; Percy L. Julian Award winner (2011)
- Robert T. Kennedy (2002–), Hobart H Willard Distinguished University Professor of Chemistry, Pharmacology; Martin Medal winner (2019)
- Nicholas A. Kotov, Irving Langmuir Distinguished Professor of Chemical Sciences and Engineering
- Adam J. Matzger (2000–), Charles G. Overberger Collegiate Professor of Chemistry, and Macromolecular Science & Engineering; Beckman Young Investigators Award (2003); Sloan Research Fellow (2005–2007)
- Anne McNeil (2007–), professor of Chemistry and Macromolecular Science and Engineering; Beckman Young Investigators Award (2009)
- Alison R. H. Narayan (2015–), associate professor of Chemistry and Research Associate Professor; Camille Dreyfus Teacher-Scholar Award (2020); Sloan Research Fellow (2019)
- Vincent L. Pecoraro (1984–), John T. Groves Collegiate Professor of Chemistry; Humboldt Research Award (1998–99); Sloan Research Fellow (1989–1990)
- James Penner-Hahn (1985–), George A Lindsay Professor of Chemistry and Biophysics
- Melanie Sanford (2003–), Moses Gomberg Collegiate Professor of Chemistry; member of the National Academy of Sciences; Blavatnik Award (2017); Sackler Prize in Chemistry (2013); Beckman Young Investigators Award (2004)
- Nils G. Walter (1999–), Francis S Collins Collegiate Professor of Chemistry, Biophysics, and Biological Chemistry
- John P. Wolfe (2002–), professor of Chemistry and associate chair of undergraduate studies; Camille Dreyfus Teacher-Scholar Award winner (2006)

==== Classical Studies ====
- Benjamin W. Fortson IV, professor of Greek and Latin Language, Literature and Historical Linguistics
- Richard Janko, Gerald F. Else Distinguished University Professor of Classical Studies
- Lisa Nevett, professor of Classical Archaeology
- David Stone Potter, Francis W. Kelsey Collegiate Professor of Greek and Roman History; professor of Greek and Latin in Ancient History
- Celia Schultz, professor of History and Classical Studies
- Nicola Terrenato, Esther B. Van Deman Collegiate Professor of Roman Studies; director of the Kelsey Museum of Archaeology

==== Communication and Media ====
- Susan J. Douglas, Catherine Neafie Kellogg Professor of communication studies
- Yanna Krupnikov, professor of communication and media

==== Comparative Literature ====
- Anton Shammas, professor of comparative literature and modern Middle Eastern literature

==== Earth and Environmental Sciences ====
- Joel D. Blum, Gerald J Keeler Distinguished Professor of Earth and Environmental Sciences

==== Ecology and Evolutionary Biology ====
- Catherine E. Badgley, professor of Ecology and Evolutionary Biology; director of the residential college
- Aimée Classen, professor of Ecology and Evolutionary Biology; director of the University of Michigan's Biological Station (UMBS)
- Meghan Duffy, Susan S. Kilham Collegiate Professor of Ecology and Evolutionary Biology
- Lacey Knowles, Robert B. Payne Collegiate Professor
- John Vandermeer, Asa Gray Distinguished University Professor of Ecology and Evolutionary Biology

==== Economics ====
- Kathryn M. Dominguez, professor of Economics and Director of Undergraduate Honors
- James R. Hines Jr., Richard A. Musgrave Collegiate Professor of Economics
- Amanda Kowalski, Gail Wilensky Professor of Applied Economics and Public Policy
- Joel Slemrod, David Bradford Distinguished University Professor of Economics
- Melvin Stephens Jr., professor of Economics
- Linda Tesar, Alan V. Deardorff Collegiate Professor of Economics
- Toni Whited, professor of Economics
- Justin Wolfers, professor of Economics

==== English Language and Literature ====
- Linda Gregerson, Frederick G.L. Huetwell Professor at University of Michigan
- Laura Kasischke, Theodore Roethke Professor of English Language and Literature
- Khaled Mattawa, professor of English Language and Literature
- Thylias Moss, professor emerita of English Language and Literature; developed Limited Fork Poetics

==== Film, Television, and Media ====
- Giorgio Bertellini, professor
- Kemp Powers (visiting), John H. Mitchell Visiting Professor in Media Entertainment
- John Valadez, professor

==== History ====
- Juan Cole, Richard P. Mitchell Collegiate Professor of History; notable for his weblog "Informed Comment", covering events in the Middle East
- Derek Peterson, professor in the departments of History and Afroamerican and African Studies
- Rebecca J. Scott, professor of History, won the 2006 Frederick Douglass Book Prize for Degrees of Freedom: Louisiana and Cuba After Slavery
- Heather Ann Thompson, professor of American history; wrote book on the Attica Prison uprising of 1971

==== History of Art ====
- Achim Timmermann, professor

==== Judaic Studies ====
- Deborah Dash Moore, Frederick G.L. Huetwell Professor of History and Judaic Studies

==== Linguistics ====
- Carmel O'Shannessy
- Sarah Thomason, William H. Gedney Professor of Linguistics

==== Mathematics ====
- Silas D. Alben (2012–), professor; Sloan Research Fellow (2011)
- Alexander Barvinok (1994–), professor; works on the combinatorics and computational complexity of polytopes with symmetry
- Hyman Bass (1999–), Samuel Eilenberg Distinguished University Professor of Mathematics and Professor of Mathematics Education; known for algebraic K-theory, commutative algebra, algebraic geometry, algebraic groups, and Riemann zeta function; awarded the Cole Prize for his paper, Unitary algebraic K-theory, Springer Lecture Notes in Mathematics, volume 343, 1973
- Lydia Bieri (2010–), professor; Simons Fellow
- Andreas Blass (1970–), professor emeritus; works in mathematical logic, particularly set theory, and theoretical computer science
- Richard Canary, professor; working on low-dimensional topology
- Dmitry Chelkak (2022–), Keeler Professor; worked with Fields medalist Stanislav Smirnov on the Ising models of statistical mechanics
- Igor Dolgachev (1978–), professor emeritus; known for Dolgachev surface
- Sergey Fomin, Richard P. Stanley Distinguished University Professor; introduced Cluster algebra with Andrei Zelevinsky; mentored Fields medalist June Huh
- William Fulton (1998–), Oscar Zariski Distinguished University Professor Emeritus; received the Steele Prize for mathematical exposition for his text Intersection Theory
- Robert L. Griess, John Griggs Thompson Distinguished University Professor of mathematics; known for classification of sporadic groups (Happy Family and pariahs), construction of the Fischer–Griess Monster group, Gilman–Griess theorem, and Griess algebra
- Melvin Hochster (1977–), Jack E. McLaughlin Distinguished University Professor of Mathematics; commutative algebraist; Guggenheim fellow; awarded the Cole Prize for his paper Topics in the homological theory of commutative rings, CBMS Regional Conference Series in Mathematics, Number 24, American Mathematical Society, 1975
- Trachette Jackson (2000–), professor; works in mathematical oncology
- Lizhen Ji (1995–), professor; Simons Fellow
- Sarah Koch (2013–), professor; works in complex analysis, complex dynamics, and Teichmüller theory
- Robert Krasny (1987–), professor; working in the field of scientific computing
- Jeffrey Lagarias (2004–), Harold Mead Stark Distinguished University Professor of Mathematics; disproved Keller's conjecture in dimensions at least 10
- Hugh L. Montgomery, professor emeritus; known for Analytic number theory
- Mircea Mustata (2004–), algebraic geometer; mentored Fields medalist June Huh
- Karen E. Smith (1997–), William Fulton Distinguished University Professor; awarded the Satter Prize for her outstanding work in commutative algebra
- Ralf J. Spatzier, professor; specialising in differential geometry, dynamical systems, and ergodic theory
- Sijue Wu (2005–), Robert W. and Lynne H. Browne Professor of Mathematics; awarded the Satter Prize for her work on a long-standing problem in the water wave equation
- Virginia R. Young (2003–), Cecil J. and Ethel M. Nesbitt Professor of Actuarial Mathematics; actuary

==== Middle East Studies ====
- Kathryn Babayan, professor of early modern Safavid Iran
- Gary Beckman, professor of Hittite and Mesopotamian Studies

==== Molecular, Cellular, and Developmental Biology ====
- Daniel J. Klionsky, professor; Alexander G Ruthven Professor of Life Sciences

==== Philosophy ====
- Elizabeth S. Anderson (1987–), John Dewey Distinguished University Professor of Philosophy and Women's Studies; Max Shaye Professor of Public Philosophy; Guggenheim Fellow (2013); MacArthur Fellow
- Allan Gibbard (1977–), Richard B. Brandt Distinguished University Professor of Philosophy Emeritus; known for Gibbard–Satterthwaite theorem, Gibbard's theorem, and norm-expressivism
- David Manley (2009–), associate professor
- Peter Railton (1979–), Gregory S. Kavka Distinguished University Professor; notable moral realists
- Laura Ruetsche (2008–), chair; Louis Loeb Collegiate Professor; Lakatos Award recipient (2013)
- Tad Schmaltz (2010–), professor of Philosophy
- Lawrence Sklar (1968–), Carl G. Hempel and; William K. Frankena Distinguished University Professor Emeritus; Guggenheim Fellow (1974)
- Brian Weatherson (2012–), Marshall M. Weinberg Professor

==== Physics ====
- Fred Adams (1991–), Ta-You Wu Collegiate Professor of Physics; Helen B. Warner Prize winner (1996)
- Christine Aidala (2012–), professor of Physics; Sloan Research Fellow (2015)
- Timothy E. Chupp (1991–), professor of Physics and Biomedical Engineering; I. I. Rabi Prize winner (1993)
- Steven Cundiff (2015–), Harrison M. Randall Collegiate Professor of Physics; Arthur L. Schawlow Prize winner (2019); Humboldt Research Award recipient (2010)
- Henriette Elvang (2009–), professor; Maria Goeppert Mayer Award recipient (2016)
- David Gerdes (1998–), chair; professor of Physics
- Gordon Kane (1965?–), Victor Weisskopf Distinguished University Professor of Physics; Julius Edgar Lilienfeld Prize winner (2012)
- Timothy A. McKay (1995–), professor of Physics, Astronomy, Education, and Associate Dean for Undergraduate Education
- Roberto Merlin (1980–), Peter A. Franken Collegiate Professor of Physics; Frank Isakson Prize winner (2006); Guggenheim Fellows (2007); Simons Foundation Fellow (2013)
- Mark Newman (2002–), Anatol Rapoport Distinguished University Professor of Complex Systems and Physics; Lagrange Prize winner (2014); Leo P. Kadanoff Prize winner (2024); Fellow of the Royal Society; Simons Foundation Fellow; Guggenheim Fellow
- Jianming Qian (1993–), David M. Dennison Collegiate Professor of Physics
- Keith Riles (1992–), H. Richard Crane Collegiate Professor of Physics; member of the LIGO Scientific Collaboration which in 2015 discovered gravitational waves
- Duncan G. Steel (1985–), professor emeritus of Electrical Engineering & Computer Science, Physics, and Biophysics
- Ctirad Uher, chair (1994–2004); C. Wilbur Peters Collegiate Professor of Physics
- Sarah Veatch (2010–), associate director of Graduate Studies; professor of Biophysics and Physics; Sloan Research Fellow (2012)
- James D. Wells (2001–), professor of Physics; Sloan Research Fellow
- Leopoldo Pando Zayas (2014–), professor of Physics

==== Political Science ====
- Christian Davenport, professor of Political Science; Mary Ann and Charles R. Walgreen, Jr., Professor for the Study of Human Understanding
- Vincent Hutchings, Hanes Walton, Jr. Collegiate Professor of Political Science and Afroamerican and African Studies
- Barbara Koremenos, professor of Political Science
- Mika LaVaque-Manty, associate professor
- Walter Mebane, professor of Political Science
- James D. Morrow, A.F.K. Organski Professor of World Politics
- George Tsebelis, Anatol Rapoport Collegiate Professor, Political Science
- Nicholas Valentino, Donald R. Kinder Collegiate Professor of Political Science

==== Psychology ====
- Kent C. Berridge (1985–), James Olds Distinguished University Professor of Psychology and Neuroscience
- David Dunning, Mary Ann and Charles R. Walgreen, Jr., Professor of the Study of Human Understanding; professor of Psychology; first described the Dunning-Kruger effect
- William Gehring, professor of Psychology
- Patricia Gurin, Nancy Cantor Distinguished University Professor Emerita of Psychology and Women's Studies
- Marita Inglehart (1986–), professor (2013–); inaugural university diversity and social transformation professor
- Ethan Kross (2008–), professor of psychology and management; founded the Emotion and Self Control Lab
- Catherine Lord (2001–), professor emerita of Psychology and Psychiatry; former director of the University of Michigan Autism & Communication Disorders Center
- Vonnie C. McLoyd (1978–), Ewart A. C. Thomas Collegiate Professor of Psychology; research scientist at the Center for Human Growth and Development
- David E. Meyer (1977–), Clyde H. Coombs and J. E. Keith Smith Distinguished University Professor Emeritus of Mathematical Psychology and Cognitive Science; chair of the Cognition and Cognitive Neuroscience area of the Psychology Department; director of the Brain, Cognition, and Action laboratory; developed the lexical decision task to investigate semantic memory with Roger W. Schvaneveldt
- Richard Nisbett (1971–), Theodore M. Newcomb Distinguished University Professor of Psychology; Donald T. Campbell Award winner; recruited by Robert Zajonc in the 1970s
- Robert Sellers (1997–), James S. Jackson Distinguished University Professor of Psychology
- Henry Wellman, Harold W. Stevenson Collegiate Professor Emeritus of Psychology

==== Romance Languages and Literatures ====
- Lawrence La Fountain-Stokes, professor of American Culture

==== Sociology ====
- Erin Cech (2016–), associate professor
- Fatma Müge Göçek (1988–), professor of Sociology
- Alexandra Killewald (2023–), professor of Sociology
- Mark Mizruchi (1991–), Robert Cooley Angell Collegiate Professor of Sociology; 2011 Guggenheim fellow
- Jeffrey Morenoff (1999–), professor of Sociology
- Pamela Smock (1994–), professor of Sociology
- George Steinmetz (1997–), Charles Tilly Collegiate Professor of Sociology and Germanic Languages and Literatures; 1995 Guggenheim fellow
- Paige L. Sweet (2020–), assistant professor
- Geneviève Zubrzycki (2003–), William H. Sewell Jr. Collegiate Professor of Sociology; 2021 Guggenheim fellow

==== Statistics ====
- Moulinath Banerjee, professor of Statistics
- Elizaveta Levina, chair;Vijay Nair Collegiate Professor of Statistics
- Naisyin Wang, professor of Statistics

==== Women's and Gender Studies ====
- Petra Kuppers, professor of Women's and Gender Studies
- Melynda Price, professor of Women's and Gender Studies; director of the Institute for Research on Women and Gender
- Gayle Rubin, associate professor of anthropology and women’s studies

=== Medical School ===
- Huda Akil, Gardner C. Quarton Professor of Neurosciences in psychiatry, professor of psychiatry and co-director and senior research scientist of the U-M Mental Health Research Institute
- James P. Bagian, director, Center for Risk Analysis Informed Decision Engineering
- Robert Bartlett, professor emeritus of Surgery
- Edward Bove, head, Section of Cardiac Surgery
- Arul Chinnaiyan, S.P. Hicks Endowed Professor of Pathology
- Kathleen R. Cho, Peter A. Ward Professor of Pathology
- Eric Fearon, Emanuel N Maisel Professor of Oncology
- Eva Feldman, James W Albers Distinguished University Professor of Neurology
- Daniel Fisher, Claude W. Hibbard Collegiate Professor of Paleontology, professor of geological sciences, professor of ecology and evolutionary biology, and curator of paleontology
- Sid Gilman, William J. Herdman Professor of Neurology
- Lori L. Isom, Maurice H. Seevers Collegiate Professor of Pharmacology
- Eve A. Kerr, Kutsche Memorial Chair of Internal Medicine
- Theodore Lawrence, professor of Radiation Oncology
- Anna Suk-Fong Lok, Dame Sheila Sherlock Distinguished University Professor of Hepatology and Internal Medicine
- George Mashour, Robert B. Sweet Professor of Anesthesiology
- Rowena G. Matthews, G. Robert Greenberg Distinguished University Professor, biological chemistry
- Michael Mulholland, professor emeritus of Surgery
- Karin Muraszko, professor of Neurosurgery
- Lisa M. Meeks, specialist in disabilities
- Gilbert S. Omenn, professor of internal medicine & Human genetics, and of public health
- Henry L. Paulson, Lucile Groff Professor of Neurology for Alzheimer's Disease and Related Disorders
- Stanley Watson, Ralph Waldo Gerard Professor of Neurosciences
- James Woolliscroft, professor emeritus of Internal Medicine and Professor Emeritus of Learning Health Sciences
- Weiping Zou, Charles B de Nancrede Professor of Surgery, Immunology and Biology; director for translational research

=== School of Music, Theatre & Dance ===
- Michael Daugherty, professor of Composition
- Aaron Dworkin, fellow and founder and president of Sphinx Organization
- Bright Sheng, professor of composition and music theory

=== School of Nursing ===
- Christopher Friese (2008–), Elizabeth Tone Hosmer Professor of Nursing; vice provost for Academic and Faculty Affairs (2024–)
- Lori J. Pierce, professor of Radiation Oncology
- Kathleen Potempa, dean emerita
- Marita G. Titler, professor emerita

=== School of Public Health ===
- Gonçalo Abecasis, Felix E. Moore Collegiate Professor of Biostatistics
- Michael Boehnke, Richard G. Cornell Collegiate Professor of Biostatistics
- F. DuBois Bowman, dean
- Arline Geronimus, professor of Health Behavior and Health Equity
- Roderick J. A. Little, Richard D. Remington Distinguished University Professor of Biostatistics

=== Gerald R. Ford School of Public Policy ===
- Robert Axelrod, Arthur W. Bromage Distinguished University Professor of Political Science & Public Policy
- Sheldon Danziger, Henry J. Meyer Distinguished University Professor Emeritus of Public Policy; political scientist, President of the Russell Sage Foundation
- James S. House, Angus Campbell Distinguished University Professor Emeritus of Survey Research, Public Policy, and Sociology
- Paula Lantz, James B. Hudak Professor of Health Policy
- Kenneth Lieberthal, professor of Political Science and William Davidson Professor of Business Administration; China expert and member of the National Security Council during the Clinton Administration
- Arthur Lupia, professor of Political Science; research professor at the Institute for Social Research; principal investigator of the American National Election Studies
- Andrei Markovits, political scientist who has written on, among other things, sports culture, nationalism, Anti-Americanism, and the European left

=== Stephen M. Ross School of Business ===
- Gerald F. Davis, Gilbert and Ruth Whitaker Professor of Business Administration
- Jeff DeGraff, clinical professor of Management and Organizations
- Gautam Kaul, professor of Finance
- Barry Klarberg, professional business and wealth manager for athletes, entertainers and high-net-worth individuals
- Aradhna Krishna, Dwight F. Benton Professor of Marketing
- Gregg Latterman, clinical assistant professor of Entrepreneurial Studies; Executive Director of the Zell Lurie Institute
- Scott E. Page, John Seely Brown Distinguished University Professor of Complexity, Social Science, and Management
- George Siedel, professor emeritus of Business Administration and Business Law
- Maxim Sytch, Jack D. Sparks Whirlpool Corporation Research Professor of Business Administration
- Noel Tichy, professor of Management and Organizations; adviser for over 30 CEO transitions, including General Motors
- Dave Ulrich, Rensis Likert Collegiate Professor of Business Administration; co-founder of The RBL Group
- James P. Walsh, Gerald and Esther Carey Professor of Business Administration
- James D. Westphal, Harvey C. Fruehauf Professor of Business Administration

=== Penny W. Stamps School of Art & Design ===
- Audrey G. Bennett (2018–), professor; university diversity and social transformation professor
- Heidi Kumao (2001–), professor of Art
- Rebekah Modrak (2003–), chair of Senate Advisory Committee on University Affairs (2024–); professor (2018–); associate professor (2005–2018); Roman J. Witt Visiting Associate Professor (2003–2005)
- Thylias Moss (1993–), professor emerita; professor of Art & Design (2006)
- Endi E. Poskovic (2008–), professor of Art and Design
- David C. Turnley (2012–), professor of Art and Design; photography, for images of the political uprisings in China and Eastern Europe

== Former faculty ==
- Linda M. Abriola, professor of civil and environmental engineering
- Henry Carter Adams, professor of political economy and finance
- Susan Alcock, professor of classical anthropology and classics
- Richard D. Alexander, Theodore H. Hubell Distinguished University Professor Emeritus of Evolutionary Biology
- Mathew Alpern, professor emeritus of physiological optics
- Dennis Assanis, former Jon R. and Beverly S. Holt Professor of Mechanical Engineering
- W. H. Auden, poet
- Leslie Bassett, professor of music
- Charles Baxter, former director of the MFA program in creative writing; novelist, poet, and essayist
- Alton L Becker, professor of linguistics
- Judith Becker, Glenn McGeoch Professor (emeritus) of Music
- R. Stephen Berry, professor of physical chemistry
- Seymour Blinder, professor emeritus of chemistry and physics
- William Bolcom, professor of music composition
- Liliana Borcea, Peter Field Collegiate Professor of Mathematics; works in scientific computing and applied mathematics
- Raoul Bott, mathematician and winner of the Wolf Prize in mathematics
- Kenneth Boulding, noted economist and faculty member 1949–1967
- Richard Brauer, awarded the Cole Prize in 1949
- Joseph Brodsky, professor of Slavic languages and literature
- Henry Billings Brown, instructor in law, later US Supreme Court justice
- Brad Bushman, professor of psychology
- Evan H. Caminker, dean of Law School
- Anne Carson, Canadian poet, essayist, and translator
- Christopher Chetsanga, discovered two enzymes that repair DNA after x-irradiation
- Noreen M Clark, dean, Marshall H. Becker Professor of Public Health
- Carl Cohen, professor of philosophy at the residential college; notable for using Michigan Freedom of Information Act (FOIA) in 1996 to identify the university's policy of racial categorization in admissions, leading to the Grutter and Gratz v. Bollinger lawsuits
- Wilbur Joseph Cohen, professor of Public Welfare Administration
- Francis Collins, professor in internal medicine and human genetics; led the Human Genome Project and is the current director of the National Institutes of Health
- Jerome Conn, Louis Harry Newburgh university Distinguished Professor Emeritus of Internal Medicine
- Philip Converse, Robert Cooley Angell Distinguished University Professor Emeritus of Sociology & Political Science, College of Literature, Science & the Arts
- Lynn Conway, professor of electrical engineering and computer science
- Charles Horton Cooley, professor of sociology; taught the university's first sociology class in 1899
- Mortimer Elwyn Cooley, second dean of the College of Engineering
- Thomas M. Cooley, law professor, and Chief Justice of the Supreme Court of Michigan
- Clyde Coombs, professor emeritus of psychology, College of Literature, Science & the Arts
- Minor J. Coon, Victor C. Vaughn Distinguished University Professor of Biological Chemistry
- Arthur Copeland, mathematician
- Ernest Courant, accelerator physicist
- H. Richard Crane, George P. Williams Distinguished University Professor Emeritus of Physics
- Elizabeth Crosby, professor of anatomy
- David Daly, Emeritus, Director of the speech clinic and the aphasia clinic
- Pierre Dansereau, Canadian ecologist known as one of the "fathers of ecology"
- John Dewey, co-founder of pragmatism
- Jack E. Dixon, Minor J. Coon Professor of Biological Chemistry, chair of the Department of Biological Chemistry
- Avedis Donabedian, Sinai Distinguished Professor Emeritus of Public Health
- Thomas M. Donahue, Edward H. White II Distinguished University Professor Emeritus of Planetary Science
- Michael Duff, Oskar Klein Professor of Physics
- Aaron Dworkin, founder and president of Sphinx Organization
- Samuel Eilenberg, cofounder of category theory together with Saunders MacLane, whom he met at Ann Arbor; winner of the Wolf Prize in mathematics
- Kazimierz Fajans, physical chemist
- Sidney Fine, professor of history; longest serving faculty member; chief biographer of Frank Murphy
- Ross Lee Finney, professor of music
- Peter Franken, physicist
- William Frankena, moral philosopher
- Ronald Freedman, Roderick D. McKenzie Professor Emeritus of Sociology, College of Literature, Science & the Arts, professor emeritus of physics, College of Literature, Science, & the Arts
- Katherine Freese, George E. Uhlenbeck Professor Emerita of Physics
- Erich Fromm, psychologist
- Cécile Fromont, assistant professor of art history
- Robert Frost, Michigan Poet-in-Residence
- Alice Fulton, professor of English 1983–2001, won the Library of Congress Rebekah Johnson Bobbitt National Prize for Poetry in 2002
- Stanley M. Garn, professor emeritus of nutrition
- Frederick Gehring, T.H. Hildebrandt Distinguished University Professor of Mathematics
- Susan Gelman, Heinz Werner Professor of psychology and linguistics
- Elmer G. Gilbert, professor of aerospace engineering and of electrical engineering & computer science
- Herman Heine Goldstine, mathematician
- Moses Gomberg, professor of chemistry
- Samuel Goudsmit, conceived, with George Uhlenbeck, the idea of quantum spin
- Edward Gramlich, professor of economics and member, Federal Reserve Board
- Kun-Liang Guan, biochemist and associate professor of biological chemistry, senior research associate at the Institute of Gerontology
- Thomas Hales, solved a nearly four-century-old problem called the Kepler conjecture
- Donald Hall, English professor and United States Poet Laureate 2006–2007
- Paul Halmos, mathematician specializing in functional analysis
- Gary Hamel, visiting professor of international business; co-author of The Core Competence of the Corporation
- William Donald "Bill" Hamilton, professor of Evolutionary Biology
- Ann Ellis Hanson, visiting associate professor of Greek and Latin
- William Herbert Hobbs, professor of Geology
- Eugene W. Hilgard, professor of mineralogy, geology, zoology, and botany
- Eric J. Hill, professor of practice in architecture
- Ada Sue Hinshaw, dean, School of Nursing
- John Henry Holland, professor of electrical engineering and computer science, College of Engineering; professor of psychology, College of Literature, Science, and the Arts
- Thomas C. Holt, professor of history, director of Center for Afroamerican and African Studies
- William Hussey, professor of astronomy and fifth director of the Detroit Observatory
- James S. Jackson, Daniel Katz Distinguished University Professor of Psychology and director, Institute for Social Research
- Daniel Hunt Janzen, evolutionary ecologist, naturalist, and conservationist
- William Le Baron Jenney, architect and engineer
- Lawrence W. Jones, professor emeritus, Department of Physics
- Robert L. Kahn, professor emeritus of psychology, College of Literature, Science, & the Arts
- Gerome Kamrowski, artist at the forefront of the development of American Surrealism and Abstract Expressionism
- Donald Katz, professor emeritus of chemical engineering
- Raymond C. Kelly, cultural anthropologist and ethnologist
- Francis Kelsey, professor of Latin
- Oskar Klein, first work in Ann Arbor dealt with the anomalous Zeeman effect
- Adrienne Koch, historian, specialist in American history of the 18th century
- Henry Kraemer, professor of pharmacy
- David E. Kuhl, professor of internal medicine; professor of radiology
- Stephen Lee, solid state chemist
- Emmett Leith, created the first working hologram in 1962
- Catherine Lord, professor (emerita) of psychology and psychiatry
- Martha L. Ludwig, research biophysicist and J. Lawrence Oncley Distinguished Professor, department of biological chemistry
- William P. Malm, professor (emeritus) of music
- Howard Markel, George E. Wantz Distinguished Professor of the History of Medicine and director of the Center for the History of Medicine
- Michael Marletta, biochemist and John Gideon Searle Professor of Medicinal Chemistry and Pharmacognosy in the College of Pharmacy and professor of biological chemistry in the Medical School
- Vincent Massey, professor of biological chemistry
- Paul McCracken, economist. Chairmen emeritus: President's Council of Economic Advisers
- George E. Mendenhall, professor emeritus: Department of Near Eastern Studies
- Barbara D. Metcalf, Alice Freeman Palmer Professor of History
- Gerald Meyers, professor at the University of Michigan Ross School of Business School, former chairman of American Motors Corporation
- Tiya Miles, professor in American Culture, History, Afroamerican & African Studies, Native American Studies, and Women's Studies (2002–2018)
- Horace Miner, professor emeritus of sociology and anthropology
- James N. Morgan, professor emeritus of economics, College of Literature, Science & the Arts
- Gerard A. Mourou, A.D. Moore Distinguished Professor of Electrical Engineering and Computer Science
- Bhramar Mukherjee, chair of Department of Biostatistics and associate director of Quantitative Data Sciences
- Margaret Murnane, professor of physics
- James Neel, Lee R. Dice Distinguished University Professor Emeritus of Human Genetics; discovered that defective genes cause sickle cell anemia
- Nicholas Negroponte (visiting), founder of MIT's Media Lab
- Reed M. Nesbit, urologist, pioneer of transurethral resection of the prostate
- Frederick George Novy, Henry L. Russell Lecturer
- Dirk Obbink, papyrologist, 2001 MacArthur Fellowship winner for his work at both Oxyrhynchus and Herculaneum
- James Olds, professor of psychology
- J. Lawrence Oncley, professor emeritus of biological chemistry
- Sherry B. Ortner, professor of anthropology and women's studies
- June Osborn, professor of epidemiology; professor of pediatrics and communicable diseases
- Daphna Oyserman, Edwin J.Thomas Professor of Social Work
- Dewitt H. Parker, professor of philosophy
- Anne C. Petersen, research professor
- Kenneth Pike, professor emeritus of linguistics, College of Literature, Science & the Arts
- Walter Bowers Pillsbury, professor of psychology
- Ovide Pomerleau, professor (emeritus) of psychology
- Will Potter, author, civil liberties advocate
- C.K. Prahalad, Paul and Ruth McCracken Distinguished University Professor of Corporate Strategy
- Anatol Rapoport, author of Two-Person Game Theory (1999) and N-Person Game Theory (2001)
- Jacob Ellsworth Reighard, professor of zoology
- Gottlieb Eliel Saarinen, architect
- Jonas Salk, assistant professor of epidemiology
- Alan R. Saltiel, elected in 2005 to the Institute of Medicine of the National Academy of Sciences, John Jacob Abel Collegiate Professor in Life Sciences and Professor of Internal Medicine and Physiology
- Artur Schnabel, pianist and classical composer
- Thomas L. Schwenk, professor of family medicine
- Thomas B. A. Senior, professor of electrical engineering and former director of Radiation Laboratory
- Harold Stark, professor of Mathematics
- Marilyn Shatz, professor emerita of Psychology and Linguistics
- Aisha Sabatini Sloan, assistant professor of creative writing and literature and English language and literature
- Kannan Soundararajan, awarded the 2004 Salem Prize, joint winner of the 2005 SASTRA Ramanujan Prize
- Claude Steele, professor of psychology
- Leland Stowe, professor of journalism
- Stephen Timoshenko, created the first US bachelor's and doctoral programs in engineering mechanics
- George Uhlenbeck, with fellow student Samuel Goudsmit at Leiden, proposed the idea of electron spin in 1925, Professor: University of Michigan (1939–43); Max Planck Medal 1964 (with Samuel Goudsmit)
- Juris Upatnieks, created the first working hologram in 1962
- Elliot Valenstein, professor (emeritus) of psychology
- Claude H. Van Tyne, professor and chairman of the history department
- Martinus Veltman, John D. MacArthur Professor of Physics
- Warren H. Wagner, professor emeritus of botany
- Peter Ward, Godfrey D. Stobbe Professor of Pathology
- Aldred Scott Warthin, professor of pathology
- Robert Mark Wenley, professor of philosophy
- Andrew Dickson White, professor of English and history, co-founder of Cornell University
- Raymond Louis Wilder, work focused on set-theoretic topology, manifolds and use of algebraic techniques
- David R. Williams, Harold W. Cruse Collegiate Professor of Sociology; professor of epidemiology
- Milford H. Wolpoff, leading proponent of the multiregional hypothesis for human evolution
- Trevor D. Wooley, department chair, Department of Mathematics, University of Michigan. Salem Prize, 1998. Alfred P. Sloan Research Fellow, 1993–1995
- Richard Wrangham, professor of anthropology
- Yukiko Yamashita, assistant professor of cell and developmental biology
- Chia-Shun Yih, Stephen P. Timoshenko Distinguished University Professor Emeritus of Fluid Mechanics

== Former administrators ==
- Nancy Cantor, provost, now chancellor of Syracuse University
- Philip J. Hanlon, provost and executive vice president for academic affairs (2010–2013), later president of Dartmouth College
- Walter Harrison, vice president, now at University of Hartford
- J. Bernard "Bernie" Machen, provost, later president of the University of Florida
- Frank H. T. Rhodes, vice president, later president of Cornell University
- Edward A. Snyder, senior associate dean, later dean at University of Chicago Business School
- B. Joseph White, dean, Ross School, later president of the University of Illinois
- Linda Wilson, vice president, later president of Radcliffe College

== Nobel laureates ==
- Joseph Brodsky (1974–80), winner of the 1987 Nobel Prize in Literature "for an all-embracing authorship, imbued with clarity of thought and poetic intensity"
- Anne Carson (2003–09), winner of the 2026 Nobel Prize in Literature "for her bold and inventive oeuvre that, in playful dialogue with the classical tradition, has created new forms for contemporary literature"
- Donald A. Glaser (1949–59), winner of the 1960 Nobel Prize in physics "for the invention of the bubble chamber"
- Charles B. Huggins (1924–27), co-winner of the 1966 Nobel Prize in Physiology or Medicine "for his discoveries concerning hormonal treatment of prostatic cancer"
- Lawrence R. Klein (1949–54), winner of the 1980 Nobel Prize in Economics "for the creation of econometric models and the application to the analysis of economic fluctuations and economic policies"
- Gérard Mourou (1988–2004), co-winner of the 2018 Nobel Prize in Physics, jointly awarded with Donna Strickland, "for their method of generating high-intensity, ultra-short optical pulses"
- Wolfgang Pauli (1931, 1941) (visiting), winner of the 1945 Nobel Prize in Physics "for the discovery of the Exclusion Principle, also called the Pauli Principle"
- Martin L. Perl (1955–63), co-winner of the 1995 Nobel Prize in Physics "for the discovery of the tau lepton"
- Norman F. Ramsey (1989–92) (visiting), co-winner of the 1989 Nobel Prize in Physics "for the invention of the separated oscillatory fields method and its use in the hydrogen maser and other atomic clocks"
- Peyton Rous (1905–08), co-winner of the 1966 Nobel Prize in Physiology or Medicine "for his discovery of tumour-inducing viruses"
- Hamilton O. Smith (1962–67), co-winner of the 1978 Nobel Prize in Physiology or Medicine, jointly awarded with Werner Arber and Daniel Nathans, "for the discovery of restriction enzymes and their application to problems of molecular genetics"
- Charles H. Townes (1952) (visiting), co-winner of the 1964 Nobel Prize in Physics "for fundamental work in the field of quantum electronics, which has led to the construction of oscillators and amplifiers based on the maser-laser principle"
- Martinus Veltman (1981–96), winner of the 1999 Nobel Prize in Physics, jointly awarded with Gerardus 't Hooft, "for elucidating the quantum structure of electroweak interactions in physics"
- Carl Wieman (1979–84), co-winner of the 2001 Nobel Prize in Physics, jointly awarded with Eric A. Cornell and Wolfgang Ketterle, "for the achievement of Bose-Einstein condensation in dilute gases of alkali atoms, and for early fundamental studies of the properties of the condensates"
- Omar M. Yaghi (1999–2006), co-winner of the 2025 Nobel Prize in Chemistry, shared with Richard Robson and Susumu Kitagawa, "for the development of metal–organic frameworks"
