= Cécile Fromont =

American art historian and educator

- Born: Cécile Alice Fromont; Martinique
- Occupations: Art historian Educator; Artist

Academic background
- Education: Harvard University
- Thesis: Under the Sign of the Cross in the Kingdom of Kongo: Shaping Images and Molding Faith in Early Modern Central Africa (2008)
- Doctoral advisors: Suzanne Blier and Thomas B. F. Cummins

Academic work
- Discipline: Art history
- Sub-discipline: African art
- Institutions: University of Michigan; University of Chicago; Yale University; Harvard University
- Website: www.cecilefromont.com

Cécile Alice Fromont is a French-born American art historian and educator. Fromont is formerly Professor of African and South Atlantic Art at Yale University and currently Professor of History of Art and Architecture, Africa, Latin America, and the Early Modern Atlantic at Harvard University.

== Career ==
Born in Martinique, Fromont initially received a degree from Sciences Po in International Relations in 2002. She then continued on to Harvard University to receive degrees in Art History: a Master of Arts in 2004 and a Doctor of Philosophy in 2008. She wrote a doctoral dissertation under Suzanne Blier and Thomas B. F. Cummins titled "Under the Sign of the Cross in the Kingdom of Kongo: Shaping Images and Molding Faith in Early Modern Central Africa."

Upon graduating, Fromont joined the Michigan Society of Fellows and began teaching at the University of Michigan as assistant professor of Art History in 2008. Two years later, she transferred to the University of Chicago. In 2017, Fromont was promoted to associate professor. In the following year, she was hired by Yale University, and also became a Fellow of the American Academy in Rome. She joined the faculty of Harvard University as Professor and Faculty Director of the Cooper Gallery in 2024.

Fromont is a specialist in the visual, material, and religious culture of the Portuguese-speaking Atlantic world during the early modern period.

Fromont is the winner of the 2024 Dan David Prize.

== See also ==
- List of Harvard University people
- List of fellows of the American Academy in Rome (2011–present)
- List of University of Chicago faculty
- List of University of Michigan faculty and staff
