= Robert Sellers (psychologist) =

Robert McKinley Sellers
- Education: University of Michigan (Ph.D.); Howard University
- Awards: Member of the National Academy of Sciences (2023)
- Scientific career
- Fields: Psychology
- Workplaces: University of Michigan; University of Virginia
- Thesis: Cross-situational consistency in the coping process, attributional style, and the academic and athletic performance of college football players (1990)
- Doctoral advisor: James S. Jackson; Christopher Peterson

Robert McKinley Sellers is the Charles D. Moody Collegiate Professor of Psychology and Education at University of Michigan who formerly served as the Vice Provost for Equity and Inclusion & Chief Diversity Officer. His research focuses on the importance of racial identity. Most specifically, Sellers focuses on the identity of African Americans, regarding a variety of domains, such as mental health and discrimination.

In 2023, he was elected to the National Academy of Sciences.

== Life and work ==
Sellers completed his undergraduate degree at Howard University, earning cum laude distinction in psychology in 1985. Additionally, Sellers earned All-American Honors in football during his years at Howard University. In 1990, Sellers attended the University of Michigan where he completed his Ph.D. in personality psychology.

After earning his Ph.D., Sellers became an assistant and associate professor in the department of psychology at the University of Virginia. In 1997, he went back to the University of Michigan to begin teaching and continue his research. For four years, Sellers served as associate chair in the department of psychology before being appointed department chair in 2011. In 2015, Sellers became the Vice Provost for Equity, Inclusion, and Academic Affairs as well as the Charles D. Moody Collegiate Professor of Psychology and Education

Sellers’ research focuses on the effect of race in one's self-construal, specifically in relation to African American identity. He is also interested in the psychology of African American student athletes. He has conducted multiple studies on the effect of race on the psychological distress, mental health and self-confidence of African American youth.

Sellers is one of the founders of the Center for the Study of Black Youth in Context (CSBYC), an organization that researches the development of young African Americans and aims to better understand their strengths in order to give them tools to protect against race specific challenges they may face in their lives.

One of Sellers’ most notable contribution to psychology is his creation of Multidimensional Model of Racial Identity (MMRI) for African Americans authored with Mia A. Smith, J. Nicole Shelton, Stephanie A. J. Rowley, and Tabbye M. Chavous. This model includes four dimensions (salience, centrality, regard, and ideology), capturing both qualitative meaning, cultural, and historical experiences of African Americans.

== Awards and recognition ==
- Past President of the Society for the Psychological Study of Ethnic Minority Issues, 2009-2010 (Division 45 of the American Psychological Association).
- A fellow of Division 8 (Society for Personality and Social Psychology) and Division 45 (Society for the Psychological Study of Culture, Ethnicity, and Race) of the American Psychological Association as well as a fellow of the Association for Psychological Science.
- Theodore Millon Mid-Career Award in Personality Psychology from the American Psychology from the American Psychological Foundation, 2011.
- American Psychological Association Minority Fellowship Program Research Achievement Award, 1997
- APAGS Kenneth & Mamie Clark Award for Outstanding Contribution to the Professional Development of Ethnic Minority Graduate Students 2014

== Personal life ==
Sellers married Tabbye Chavous, a professor of psychology and education at the University of Michigan. The couple met at the University of Virginia, and co-authored the Multidimensional Model of Racial Identity (MMRI) in 1998. Chavous currently holds Sellers' former position as the Vice Provost for Equity and Inclusion & Chief Diversity Officer for the University of Michigan. His mother, Eddie Lee Ralls Sellers, worked as a nurse, and opened her own community health center. His father, Richard David Sellers, was a Presbyterian minister. He was born in Morgantown, West Virginia and grew up with two brothers, David and Daniel, and one sister, Gwendolyn. He began playing football at age 6 and continued his career at Howard University, where he received All-American honors.
