= Jianming Qian =

Jianming Qian is a professor of physics at the University of Michigan. In 2009, he was named a Fellow of the American Physical Society after he was nominated by their Division of Particles and Fields for outstanding contributions and leadership in the analysis of high-energy particle interactions at CERN, L3 and ATLAS experiments, and at Fermilab, with especially noteworthy participation in the D-Zero experiment leading to the recent discovery of two new baryons containing b-qu.

== See also ==
- List of fellows of the American Physical Society (1998–2010)
