= Vincent Hutchings =

American political scientist (born 1965)

- Born: October 17, 1965 (age 61)

Academic background
- Education: San Jose State University (BA); University of California, Los Angeles (MA, PhD)
- Thesis: The dynamics of congressional representation: how citizens monitor legislators in the House and Senate (1998)

Academic work
- Institutions: University of Michigan; American National Election Studies; University of Michigan Institute for Social Research

Vincent Lamont Hutchings (born October 17, 1965) is an American political scientist. He is a political science professor at the University of Michigan and a research professor at the Institute for Social Research. He was elected a Fellow of the National Academy of Sciences in 2022.

== Early life and education ==
Hutchings was born on October 17, 1965. He completed his Bachelor of Arts degree in political science at San Jose State University before enrolling at the University of California, Los Angeles for his graduate degrees.

== Career ==
After receiving his doctorate, Hutchings accepted a Robert Wood Johnson Foundation Health Policy Scholarship to conduct research at Yale University from 2000 to 2002. Upon joining the faculty at the University of Michigan, Hutchings published his first book entitled Public Opinion and Democratic Accountability: How Citizens Learn about Politics.

On July 16, 2026, the Regents of the University of Michigan approved the appointment of Hutchings as the Hanes Walton Jr. Distinguished University Professor of Political Science and Afroamerican and African Studies, effective September 1, 2026.

== Academic research ==
In 2004, Hutchings served as co-Principal Investigator of the National Politics Study, a national survey of Whites, Latinos, African Americans, Afro-Caribbeans and Asian Americans. He also received a grant from the National Science Foundation for his project "Elite Communications and Racial Group Conflict in the 21st Century" from 2009 to 2011.

As the 2012 United States presidential election loomed, Hutchings became the University of Michigan's Principal Investigator for the American National Election Study (ANES) for the 2012 election cycle. He was also elected a Fellow of the American Academy of Arts and Sciences for making "innovative contributions to the areas of public opinion, elections, voting behavior, and African American politics." Following the 2012 election, Hutchings continued to serve as co-principal investigator of the ANES to conduct a series of surveys on political participation and vote choice leading up to the 2016 presidential election. At the same time, Hutchings was named President-Elect of the Midwest Political Science Association in 2016.

Hutchings' work was recognized in 2020 with the Tronstein Award in recognition of "innovative and outstanding teaching of undergraduate students in the University of Michigan Department of Political Science." He was also named the recipient of the University Diversity and Social Transformation Professorship. In 2022, Hutchings received the Rackham Distinguished Graduate Mentor Award and was elected a Fellow of the National Academy of Sciences.

== Selected publications ==
- Public Opinion and Democratic Accountability: How Citizens Learn about Politics (2003)
