= Zhen Xu =

Chinese-American biomedical engineer

- 徐蓁
- Education: Southeast University, University of Michigan (M.S. 2003, Ph.D. 2005)
- Occupation: Professor
- Employer: University of Michigan
- Known for: Outstanding contribution to invention and development of histotripsy, an image-guided, noninvasive ultrasonic cavitation therapy
- Notable work: Development and clinical translation of non-invasive mechanical ultrasound ablation technology
- Awards: IEEE Carl Hellmuth Hertz Ultrasonics Award
- Scientific career
- Fields: Biomedical engineering
- Institutions: University of Michigan
- Thesis: Controlled ultrasound tissue erosion (2005)
- Doctoral advisor: Charles Cain

Zhen Xu (Chinese: 徐蓁) is Li Ka-Shing Endowed Professor of Biomedical Engineering at the University of Michigan, where she also holds professorships in radiology and neurosurgery. Her research concerns surgical applications of focused ultrasound in tumors and cancer treatment.

== Early and education ==
Zhen Xu was born in Nanjing, China, and she studied biomedical engineering as an undergraduate at Southeast University in Nanjing, graduating in 2001. She went to the University of Michigan for graduate study, receiving a master's degree in 2003 and completing her Ph.D. in 2005. She was given the Li Ka-Shing Endowed Professorship at the University of Michigan in 2024.

== Career ==
Xu discovered what later became known as the field of histotripsy while work in a laboratory during her doctoral studies. Being credited as one of the first people to develop this form of non-invasive surgical treatment for tumors and cancer.

Xu was named as a Fellow of the American Institute for Medical and Biological Engineering in 2019, "for outstanding contribution to invention and development of histotripsy, an image-guided, noninvasive ultrasonic cavitation therapy", and became a Fellow of the National Academy of Inventors in 2024. She was the 2024 recipient of the IEEE Carl Hellmuth Hertz Ultrasonics Award, "for invention and clinical translation of histotripsy - the noninvasive mechanical ultrasound ablation technology", and she was named to the 2025 class of IEEE Fellows "for development and clinical translation of non-invasive mechanical ultrasound ablation technology". She was a winner of the 2026 Sony Women in Technology Award with Nature for "her pioneering work, as a co-inventor of the field of histotripsy, to allow non-invasive surgery using ultrasound without incision or injury." She was listed as an innovator in the Time100 Health 2026.
