= Robert D. Gregg =

American bioengineer

- Born: United States
- Occupations: Bioengineer; roboticist; inventor; academic

Academic background
- Education: B.S., Electrical Engineering and Computer Sciences; M.S., Electrical and Computer Engineering; PhD, Electrical and Computer Engineering
- Alma mater: University of California; University of Illinois at Urbana-Champaign

Academic work
- Institutions: University of Michigan

Robert D. Gregg is an American bioengineer, roboticist, inventor and academic. He is an associate professor at the University of Michigan.

Gregg is most known for his works on bipedal locomotion control and wearable robotics. His research focuses on integrating human biomechanics insights into robot control algorithms, improving natural movement efficiency. His work has targeted enhancing mobility for individuals with disabilities, particularly through robotic prosthetic legs mimicking natural gait patterns to reduce asymmetry. He has overseen clinical trials using wearable robots for injury prevention in workplaces, elderly mobility enhancement, and restoring natural locomotion for above-knee amputees.

He is the recipient of the 2013 NIH Director's New Innovator Award and 2017 National Science Foundation CAREER Award.

== Education ==
Gregg earned his Bachelor of Science in Electrical Engineering and Computer Sciences from the University of California in 2006, followed by a Master of Science in Electrical and Computer Engineering from the University of Illinois at Urbana-Champaign in 2007. He completed his PhD in Electrical and Computer Engineering at the same university in 2010.

== Career ==
Gregg began his academic career as a research scientist at the Rehabilitation Institute of Chicago from 2012 to 2013. He then joined the University of Texas at Dallas, serving as an assistant professor from 2013 to 2019 and concurrently as the Eugene McDermott Professor from 2018 to 2019. From 2020 to 2022, he was the associate director for graduate education in robotics at the University of Michigan, where he has been an associate professor since 2019.

== Research ==
For his research, Gregg has received grants from organizations, including NIH and NSF. In his early research, he concentrated on the controlled reduction of bipedal walking robots. He introduced a hierarchical framework using asymptotically stable gait primitives for motion planning in 3-D bipedal walking, reducing the problem to a low-dimensional discrete tree search and demonstrating its effectiveness in navigating obstacles with examples including the 3-D compass-gait biped and more complex models. As a result of his 2011 to 2013 research, he devised advanced biomimetic control strategies for powered prosthetic legs, emphasizing a kinematic constraint and output linearizing controller to enhance both wearability and performance. Furthermore, his control algorithm research has facilitated robotic prosthetic legs in replicating natural walking patterns, diminishing gait asymmetry in individuals with lower-limb amputations.

Gregg's recent research has focused on projects including phase-based control of prosthetic legs. This research has focused on enhancing the functionality of powered prosthetic legs for individuals with lower-limb amputations by developing a continuous parameterization method that synchronizes the prosthetic leg's motion with the user's activities and timing during the gait cycle, potentially leading to smoother and more natural mobility. In another research project, his group has focused on developing a novel control methodology for rehabilitation orthoses/exoskeletons based on task-invariant, energetic principles, allowing dynamic offloading of the weight of patients during gait rehabilitation. Some of his work has focused on developing compact, lightweight, wearable actuators for lower-limb orthoses and prostheses, using custom high-torque motors with low-ratio transmissions to achieve high output torques with minimal back drive, promoting comfort, user participation, swing freedom, impact absorption, and energy regeneration during human locomotion.

== Awards and honors ==
- 2012 – Career Award at the Scientific Interface, Burroughs Wellcome Fund
- 2013 – NIH Director's New Innovator Award, National Institutes of Health
- 2017 – NSF CAREER Award, National Science Foundation

== Selected articles ==
- Gregg, R. D., Lenzi, T., Hargrove, L. J., & Sensinger, J. W. (2014). Virtual constraint control of a powered prosthetic leg: From simulation to experiments with transfemoral amputees. IEEE Transactions on Robotics, 30(6), 1455–1471.
- Villarreal, D. J., Poonawala, H. A., & Gregg, R. D. (2016). A robust parameterization of human gait patterns across phase-shifting perturbations. IEEE Transactions on Neural Systems and Rehabilitation Engineering, 25(3), 265–278.
- Quintero, D., Villarreal, D. J., Lambert, D. J., Kapp, S., & Gregg, R. D. (2018). Continuous-phase control of a powered knee–ankle prosthesis: Amputee experiments across speeds and inclines. IEEE Transactions on Robotics, 34(3), 686–701.
- Lv, G., Zhu, H., & Gregg, R. D. (2018). On the design and control of highly backdrivable lower-limb exoskeletons: A discussion of past and ongoing work. IEEE Control Systems Magazine, 38(6), 88–113.
- Elery, T., Rezazadeh, S., Nesler, C., & Gregg, R. D. (2020). Design and validation of a powered knee–ankle prosthesis with high-torque, low-impedance actuators. IEEE Transactions on Robotics, 36(6), 1649–1668.
