= Naisyin Wang =

Naisyin Wang is a Taiwanese statistician who works as a professor of statistics at the University of Michigan. She was president of the International Chinese Statistical Association in 2010.

== Education and career ==
Wang did her undergraduate studies in mathematics at National Tsing Hua University, graduating in 1986. After earning a master's degree in statistics from Ohio State University in 1987, she completed her doctorate from Cornell University in 1992, under the supervision of David Ruppert. She worked as a faculty member at Texas A&M University from 1992 until 2009, when she moved to Michigan.

== Awards and honors ==
She is a fellow of the American Association for the Advancement of Science, the American Statistical Association, and the Institute of Mathematical Statistics, and an elected member of the International Statistical Institute.
