= Scott Mahlke =

American electrical engineer

Scott Mahlke from the University of Michigan, Ann Arbor, MI was named Fellow of the Institute of Electrical and Electronics Engineers (IEEE) in 2015 for contributions to compiler code generation and automatic processor customization.
