= James D. Westphal =

James D. Westphal conducts research and teaches in the areas of strategic management and organizational theory at the Stephen M. Ross School of Business, University of Michigan. Westphal’s research examines symbolic management and impression management processes in relations between corporate leaders and firm constituents, as well as social psychological processes in corporate governance and the corporate elite.

Westphal received his PhD from the Kellogg School of Management, Northwestern University. From 1996 to 2006 he taught at the McCombs School of Business, University of Texas at Austin. He has taught courses in strategic management and organizational behavior at the undergraduate, M.B.A., and Ph.D. levels.

Westphal served as Representative-at-Large of the Organization and Management Theory (OMT) Division of the Academy of Management from 2001 to 2004. He also served as Division Chair of the Business Policy and Strategy (BPS) Division of the Academy of Management. He currently serves as an associate editor at Strategic Management Journal.

Westphal's research has been referenced in a variety of media outlets, including Business Week, CNBC, The Economist, Fortune, Harper's, National Public Radio, The New York Times, The New Yorker, The Wall Street Journal, and The Washington Post.
