= Mary-Ann Mycek =

American physicist

- Education: University of California, Berkeley
- Scientific career
- Workplaces: Dartmouth College; University of Michigan
- Thesis: Ultrafast dynamics of coulomb correlated excitons in GaAs quantum wells (1995)

Mary-Ann Mycek is an American physicist who is a professor of biomedical engineering at the University of Michigan. She develops optical approaches for diagnostics and monitoring that she translates out of the laboratory and into the clinic. She is a Fellow of the American Institute for Medical and Biological Engineering and SPIE.

== Early life and education ==
Myeck has loved puzzles and mathematics since she was a child. She was an undergraduate student at the Rochester Institute of Technology. She was a graduate student at the University of California, Berkeley. Her research studied the ultrafast dynamics of correlated excitons in GaAs quantum wells. She was a postdoctoral researcher at the Massachusetts General Hospital and Harvard Medical School.

== Research and career ==
Myeck joined Dartmouth College as an assistant professor in 1998. She remained there for five years, before joining the University of Michigan as an associate professor. She was made Associate Department Chair as head of the Graduate Program and then head of Translational Research. In 2012 she was made professor, and eventually she was made Associate Dean for Graduate Education.

Myeck's research uses a "bench-to-bedside" approach to translate optical science to clinical contexts. In 2021, she was made Chair of the Department of Biomedical Engineering. She has driven strategy to support engineers from historically excluded groups find positions in academia. Myeck has developed a reporting and communication framework for Michigan Engineering, and launched a hub for engineering student wellness.

== Awards and honors ==
- 2012 Selected as an SPIE Woman in Optics
- 2014 Fellow of the American Institute for Medical and Biological Engineering
- 2017 Fellow of SPIE

== Selected publications ==
- Geeta Mehta; Khamir Mehta; Dhruv Sud; et al. (1 April 2007). "Quantitative measurement and control of oxygen levels in microfluidic poly(dimethylsiloxane) bioreactors during cell culture". Biomedical Microdevices. 9 (2): 123–134. doi:10.1007/s10544-006-9005-7. ISSN 1387-2176. PMID 17160707. Wikidata Q40198000.
- M A Mycek; K T Schomacker; N S Nishioka (1 October 1998). "Colonic polyp differentiation using time-resolved autofluorescence spectroscopy". Gastrointestinal Endoscopy. 48 (4): 390–394. doi:10.1016/s0016-5107(98)70009-4. ISSN 0016-5107. PMID 9786112. Wikidata Q31993883.
- Matthew D Keller; Elizabeth Vargis; Nara de Matos Granja; Robert H Wilson; Mary-Ann Mycek; Mark C Kelley; Anita Mahadevan-Jansen (1 July 2011). "Development of a spatially offset Raman spectroscopy probe for breast tumor surgical margin evaluation". Journal of Biomedical Optics. 16 (7): 077006. doi:10.1117/1.3600708. ISSN 1083-3668. PMC 3144975. PMID 21806286. Wikidata Q35131833.
