= Louise Willingale =

Laser physicist

- Education: Imperial College London
- Scientific career
- Fields: Laser physics, plasma physics
- Workplaces: University of Michigan
- Thesis: Ion acceleration from high intensity laser plasma interactions: Measurements and applications (2007)
- Doctoral advisor: Karl Krushelnick, Zulfikar Najmudin
- Website: willingale.engin.umich.edu

Louise Willingale is a laser physicist at the University of Michigan and associate director of the National Science Foundation (NSF) ZEUS facility.

== Education ==
Willingale was born in 1981. She completed her undergraduate Physics degree (MSci) from Imperial College London in 2003 and stayed on to complete her PhD in 2007 with her thesis titled Ion acceleration from high intensity laser plasma interactions: Measurements and applications. She was then a research assistant before moving to the University of Michigan to carry out postdoc studies.

== Career ==
Willingale is interested in experiments and numerical modeling of high intensity laser plasma interactions and laser-driven ion acceleration. She has made use of advancements in laser technology, mainly chirped pulse amplification which was developed by Gérard Mourou who shared the 2018 Nobel Prize in Physics.

Willingale has been successful at winning a range of funding as principal investigator and is a member of the Institute of Physics, American Physical Society, and IEEE.

In 2016–17 Willingale was a senior lecturer at Lancaster University, before returning to the University of Michigan.

As of 2022, she is associate professor at the University of Michigan in the Department of Electrical Engineering and Computer Science and associate director and co-principal investigator of the NSF Zetawatt-Equivalent Ultrashort pulse laser System (ZEUS) facility, which will be the highest peak power laser in the US and one of the most powerful in the world. ZEUS is designed to have a maximum peak power of 3 petawatts but can simulate much higher powers by firing it at a high-energy electron beam travelling in the opposite direction. In 2022 she also became a Fellow of the American Physical Society.

== Awards and honours ==
- 2008 – Institute of Physics Culham Thesis Prize
- 2008 – European Physical Society Plasma Physics Division PhD Research Award
- 2018 – National Science Foundation CAREER award
- 2022 – Fellow of the American Physical Society for "significant contributions to the experimental understanding of ion acceleration, electron acceleration and magnetic field dynamics resulting from relativistic laser plasma interactions."
- 2022 – National Academy of Sciences Kavli Fellow
- 2023 – University of Michigan EECS Outstanding Achievement Award

== Selected publications ==
- Nilson, P. M.; Willingale, L.; Kaluza, M. C.; Kamperidis, C.; Minardi, S.; Wei, M. S.; Fernandes, P.; Notley, M.; Bandyopadhyay, S.; Sherlock, M.; Kingham, R. J.; Tatarakis, M.; Najmudin, Z.; Rozmus, W.; Evans, R. G.; Haines, M. G.; Dangor, A. E.; Krushelnick, K. (19 December 2006). "Magnetic Reconnection and Plasma Dynamics in Two-Beam Laser-Solid Interactions". Physical Review Letters. 97 (25) 255001. Bibcode:2006PhRvL..97y5001N. doi:10.1103/PhysRevLett.97.255001. PMID 17280361.
- Willingale, L.; Mangles, S. P. D.; Nilson, P. M.; Clarke, R. J.; Dangor, A. E.; Kaluza, M. C.; Karsch, S.; Lancaster, K. L.; Mori, W. B.; Najmudin, Z.; Schreiber, J.; Thomas, A. G. R.; Wei, M. S.; Krushelnick, K. (22 June 2006). "Collimated Multi-MeV Ion Beams from High-Intensity Laser Interactions with Underdense Plasma" (PDF). Physical Review Letters. 96 (24) 245002. Bibcode:2006PhRvL..96x5002W. doi:10.1103/PhysRevLett.96.245002. PMID 16907250.
- Willingale, L.; Nagel, S. R.; Thomas, A. G. R.; Bellei, C.; Clarke, R. J.; Dangor, A. E.; Heathcote, R.; Kaluza, M. C.; Kamperidis, C.; Kneip, S.; Krushelnick, K.; Lopes, N.; Mangles, S. P. D.; Nazarov, W.; Nilson, P. M.; Najmudin, Z. (26 March 2009). "Characterization of High-Intensity Laser Propagation in the Relativistic Transparent Regime through Measurements of Energetic Proton Beams". Physical Review Letters. 102 (12) 125002. Bibcode:2009PhRvL.102l5002W. doi:10.1103/PhysRevLett.102.125002. PMID 19392290.
