= Jing Sun =

Chinese marine engineer and control theorist

Jing Sun is a Chinese American marine engineer and control theorist who studies control systems for vehicle propulsion, and is known for her work combining robust control and adaptive control. She is Michael G. Parsons Collegiate Professor of Naval Architecture and Marine Engineering at the University of Michigan, and chair of the University of Michigan Department of Naval Architecture and Marine Engineering.

== Education and career ==
Sun earned a bachelor's degree in 1982 in electrical and electronic engineering, and a master's degree in automatic control in 1984, both from the University of Science and Technology of China. She completed a Ph.D. in electrical engineering systems at the University of Southern California in 1989.

After completing her doctorate, she became an assistant professor at Wayne State University, but left academia in 1993 to become a control systems engineer at Ford Research Laboratories, part of the Ford Motor Company. In 2003 she returned to academia as an associate professor at the University of Michigan.

== Books ==
With Petros A. Ioannou, Sun is the coauthor of the book Robust Adaptive Control (Prentice-Hall, 1996, and Dover, 2012)..

== Recognition ==
With Jessy Grizzle, Sun won the Control Systems Technology Award of the IEEE Control Systems Society in 2003. In 2004, she was named an IEEE Fellow "for contributions to systems theory and automotive powertrain control". Sun was given the Michael G. Parsons Collegiate Professorship in 2015. In 2020 she was elected as a fellow of the International Federation of Automatic Control.
