= Melynda Price =

American educator

Dr. Melynda Price
- Occupations: Robert E. Harding, Jr. Professor of Law and the Director of the African American and Africana Studies Program

Academic background
- Education: Prairie View A&M University, University of Texas School of Law
- Alma mater: University of Michigan

Academic work
- Discipline: Law
- Sub-discipline: African American and Africana Studies and Gender and Women's Studies
- Institutions: University of Kentucky

Dr. Melynda J. Price is the Robert E. Harding, Jr. Professor of Law and the Director of the African American and Africana Studies Program in the College of Arts and Sciences at the University of Kentucky. Her research focuses on race, gender and citizenship, the politics of punishment and the role of law in the politics of race and ethnicity in and bordering the U.S.

In 2008, the Ford Foundation awarded her a Diversity Postdoctoral Fellowship. She writes for the New York Times.

== Bibliography ==
- 2015: At the Cross: Race, Religion and Citizenship in the Politics of the Death Penalty (Oxford University Press)
- 2009: Performing Discretion or Discrimination: Race, Ritual, and Peremptory Challenges in Capital Jury Selection, Michigan Journal of Race and Law
- 2008: Balancing Lives: Individual Accountability and the Death Penalty as Punishment for Genocide (Lessons from Rwanda), Emory International Law Journal
- 2006: Litigating Salvation: Race, Religion, and Innocence in the Cases of Karla Faye Tucker and Gary Graham, Southern California Review of Law and Social Justice

== Professional memberships ==
- Texas Bar Association
- American Association of Law School
- Law and Society Association
- American Political Science Association
- National Conference of Black Political Scientists
- Association for the Study of African American Life and History
- Berkshire Conference of Women Historians
