= James Woolliscroft =

American physician

- Born: Alexandria, Minnesota, US

Academic background
- Education: BS, 1972, MD, 1976, University of Minnesota

James O. Woolliscroft is an American internist, the Lyle C. Roll Professor of Medicine at the University of Michigan, where he also served as dean from 2007 until 2015.

== Early life and education ==
Woolliscroft was born in Alexandria, Minnesota and attended Jefferson High School. After graduating in 1969, Woolliscroft enrolled at the University of Minnesota for his Bachelor of Science degree in 1972 and medical degree.

== Career ==
Upon completing his residency, Woolliscroft joined the faculty at the University of Michigan (UMich) in 1980. In 1996, he became the inaugural Josiah Macy Jr. Professorship of Medical Education, the United States' first endowed chair in medical education. Following this, he was also appointed assistant dean for clinical affairs and associate dean for graduate medical education. In January 2001, he received a second endowed professorship, the Lyle C. Roll Professor of Medicine. While serving in this role, he was elected a fellow of the Association of American Medical Colleges Council of Deans and received the Society of General Internal Medicine’s Career Achievement in Medical Education Award.

In 2007, Woolliscroft was selected as dean of the University of Michigan School of Medicine. Following this, he received the Merrell Flair Award as someone who "has made a major contribution over a significant time period to the process or administration or transmission of information regarding medical education in North America." As dean, he led the institutional effort to purchase an adjacent campus that is now the University of Michigan North Campus Research Complex. He also developed a partnership with Peking University Health Science Center to form the Joint Institute for Translational & Clinical Research. In 2013 Woolliscroft was elected a member of the National Academy of Medicine.

Beyond the university, Woolliscroft also participated in U.S. Representative Fred Upton's bipartisan 21st Century Cures initiative to focus on accelerating the discovery, development, and delivery of lifesaving treatments for patients. As a result, he was recognized by the Association of American Medical Colleges with the 2014 Abraham Flexner Award for Distinguished Service to Medical Education. Woolliscroft stepped down as dean in late 2015 and returned to UMich as a professor of internal medicine and learning health sciences in the Medical School.

During the COVID-19 pandemic, Woolliscroft published "Innovation in Response to the COVID-19 Pandemic Crisis" in Academic Medicine.
