= Noreen M. Clark =

Medical professor

Noreen M Clark
- Born: Glasgow, Scotland
- Education: Columbia University; University of Utah
- Occupations: Myron E. Wegman Distinguished University Professor; Director of the Center for Managing Chronic Disease; Professor of Health Behavior & Health Education; Professor of Pediatrics
- Employer: University of Michigan
- Website: Center for Managing Chronic Disease

Noreen M. Clark was the Myron E. Wegman Distinguished University Professor, Director of the Center for Managing Chronic Disease, Professor of Health Behavior & Health Education, and Professor of Pediatrics at the University of Michigan. From 1995-2005 she served as Dean of Public Health and Marshall H. Becker Professor of Public Health at the University of Michigan. She was interested in systems, policies and programs that promote health, prevent illness, and enable individuals to manage disease.

== Leadership positions ==
Among the numerous leadership positions held by Dr. Clark, she served as Co-Chair for the Institute of Medicine Committee on Advancing Pain Research, Care, and Education. She has served as National Program Director for the Robert Wood Johnson Foundation Allies Against Asthma Program. She has been a member of the Advisory Council of the National Institute of Environmental Health Sciences. She has been president of the Society for Public Health Education and chair of the Public Health Education Section of the American Public Health Association. She has served as chair of the Behavioral Science Section of the American Thoracic Society, as a member of the Pulmonary Diseases Advisory Committee for the National Heart, Lung, and Blood Institute, and as a member of the Institute's Advisory Committee on Prevention, Education, and Control. She has served on the Centers for Disease Control and Prevention (CDC) Task Force on Community Preventive Services. Dr. Clark was a member of the Coordinating Council of the National Asthma Education and Prevention Program and of its Science Base Committee, and has chaired the American Lung Association (ALA) Technical Advisory Group on Asthma, and the Lung Diseases Care and Education Committee. She has served on both the Board and Council of the ALA. She is the former editor of Health Education and Behavior and Associate Editor of Annual Review of Public Health.

== Honors and distinctions ==
She is the recipient of the Distinguished Fellow Award, the highest honor bestowed by the Society for Public Health Education; the Derryberry Award for outstanding contribution to health education in behavioral science given by the American Public Health Association(APHA); the Health Education Research Award conferred by the National Asthma Education and Prevention Program of the National Institutes of Health (NIH) for leadership and research contributions; the Distinguished Career Award in Health Education and Promotion given by the APHA; the Behavioral Science Lifetime Achievement Award of the American Thoracic Society; and the Healthtrac Education Prize. She is a member of the Institute of Medicine of the National Academy of Sciences.

== Center for Managing Chronic Disease ==
Dr. Clark directed the Center for Managing Chronic Disease, a research and demonstration effort that involves a network of researchers and interventionists worldwide who study the social, behavioral, and clinical aspects of disease management. The Center's aim is to build the capacity for effective chronic disease prevention and management. The focus of this work is people at risk as well as those who can help them—family, clinicians, communities, and systems.

== Research ==
Dr. Clark's research specialty was management of disease, and she conducted many large-scale program evaluations. She attempted to identify the elements of self-regulation, and used management of asthma and heart disease as models for examining constructs. Her studies of disease management contributed to the research literature and the field of practice by demonstrating that educational interventions for patients and providers can decrease asthma and heart-related hospitalizations and medical emergencies. Her work resulted in an archetype educational program for health care facilities distributed by the NIH and used in hundreds of clinics nationally and internationally. A program that adapted the model for use in public schools is being disseminated by the ALA and has to date reached almost a million school children. Other model programs for management of asthma and heart disease by patients, clinicians, and communities, including PACE (Physician Asthma Care Education), are used worldwide. New models, for example, related to diabetes and obesity, were studied by Dr. Clark and her research team.

Dr. Clark had extensive international experience. Her work included testing of interventions designed to improve health status, quality of life, and collaborative activity among rural people in Kenya and in the Philippines, and urban dwellers in Beijing, China. In addition, she was a consultant for a wide range of international organizations including the Ethiopian Women's Welfare Association; the Ministry of Education in Nepal; the Asia Foundation in Pakistan; the Directorate of Health in Portugal; the World Bank; the United Nations Development Program; the Synergos Institute; the Community Health Authority of Madrid; and the Beijing Heart, Lung and Vessel Institute, among others. She served on the board of directors of World Education Inc. and of Family Care International. Dr. Clark served on the Overseas Development Council and on the board of the Aaron Diamond Foundation. She was a member of the Council on Foreign Relations.
