= George Mashour =

Academic background
- Education: MD, PhD, Georgetown University School of Medicine

George Alexander Mashour is an American anesthesiologist and neuroscientist.

== Early life and education ==
Mashour completed his undergraduate degree in philosophy at St. John's College, Annapolis (the "Great Books" program), during which time he was a fellow of the University of Chicago. He completed his M.D. and Ph.D. in Neuroscience at the Georgetown University School of Medicine. Following his medical degree, Mashour completed his residency and chief residency in the Department of Anesthesia & Critical Care at the Massachusetts General Hospital and Harvard Medical School. He received recognition as a Fulbright Scholar during his time at both Georgetown and Harvard, studying neuroscience in Germany for each fellowship.

== Career ==
Research

Mashour is a Professor at the University of Michigan Medical School; his main scientific focus has been the study of consciousness and its disruption during general anesthesia and sleep. He built and led a NIH-funded, multidisciplinary research team spanning neuroscience, anesthesiology, physics, network science, engineering, psychology, and philosophy. In the field of anesthesiology, his research team has made a number of important contributions, which include: (1) playing a key role in introducing the science of consciousness to the study of anesthetic mechanisms, (2) conducting the first application of graph theory/network science to the study of anesthetic state transitions in the brain, (3) clarifying the relationship of sleep and general anesthesia through studies of homeostasis and causal interventions in the hypothalamus, and (4) identifying a common neural correlate of propofol, sevoflurane, and ketamine anesthesia in humans and animals. Additionally, he has led or co-led major clinical studies of neurologic and psychiatric outcomes of surgery, including investigations of intraoperative awareness, perioperative stroke, and delirium. In the field of neuroscience, Mashour has been recognized internationally for (1) investigating the neurobiology of consciousness, (2) elucidating the role of the prefrontal cortex in the control of arousal states, (3) identifying neural correlates of consciousness in the dying brain, and (4) elucidating the dynamics of the conscious and unconscious brain. He has also studied the interfaces of quantum physics and neuroscience as well as psychedelic neuroscience. Mashour’s work has been conducted with collaborators across multiple fields and institutions.

Academic Leadership

Mashour is currently Vice Dean for Faculty and has served in numerous other academic leadership positions at the University of Michigan Medical School, including: (1) Founding Director, Center for Consciousness Science; (2) Associate Dean, Clinical and Translational Research; (3) Executive Director, Michigan Institute for Clinical Health Research; (4) Chair, Department of Anesthesiology; (5) Founding Director, Michigan Psychedelic Center; (6) Senior Associate Dean, Faculty and Faculty Development; and (7) Interim Executive Vice Dean, Academic Affairs. Nationally, he is a past president of the Association of University Anesthesiologists, past president of the Society for Neuroscience in Anesthesiology and Critical Care, and former board member of the International Anesthesia Research Society, Foundation for Anesthesia Education and Research, and Association for Clinical and Translational Science. Mashour has served on NIH study sections and on the NIH Steering Committee for the Clinical and Translational Science Awards program.

Recognition

Mashour has been recognized widely for his research and academic leadership, including: Presidential Scholar Award, American Society of Anesthesiologists; Excellence in Research Award, American Society of Anesthesiologists; Elected Fellow, American Association for the Advancement of Science; and Elected Member, National Academy of Medicine.
