= Anna Suk-Fong Lok =

American gastroenterologist

- 駱淑芳
- Other names: Anna S. F. Lok
- Occupations: Physician, gastroenterologist
- Known for: Guidelines for the WHO and AASLD for hepatitis B
- Scientific career
- Institutions: University of Michigan Ann Arbor

Anna Suk-Fong Lok (Chinese: 駱淑芳) is a gastroenterologist who studied in Hong Kong and moved to the United States in 1992. She is a Professor of Medicine at the University of Michigan in Ann Arbor and helped the World Health Organization (WHO) and American Association for the Study of Liver Diseases (AASLD) develop guidelines for medical professionals and recommendations for the general public on who should be treated and how treatments should be administered to persons with hepatitis B infections.

== Biography ==
Lok obtained a medical degree from the University of Hong Kong and then completed her training in hepatology at the Royal Free Hospital in London, UK under the direction of Dame Sheila Sherlock. She returned to the University of Hong Kong and taught there until moving to Tulane University of New Orleans, as Chief of Hepatology in 1992. In 1995, she left Louisiana and became a Professor of Medicine at the University of Michigan in Ann Arbor.

Lok has researched the history and treatment of hepatitis B and she was one of the first to outline the various phases of chronic viral infection. She has also been at the forefront of research on the effects of chemotherapy and antiviral therapy for hepatitis B, utilizing grants from the National Institutes of Health in Bethesda, Maryland and Veterans Health Administration in Washington, D.C. Lok was instrumental in helping the WHO and the AASLD develop guidelines for medical professionals and recommendations for the general public on who should be treated and how treatments should be administered to persons with hepatitis B infections. The guidelines are specifically designed for countries where no national guidelines exist or where there is no regional liver association issuing protocols for recommended procedures and treatment.

Her clinical trials work on hepatitis C was published in the New England Journal of Medicine and she is director of clinical hepatology on a study for trials of a new hepatitis B vaccine from Cuba in which eight countries are participating. Lok has won numerous awards throughout her career. In 2008, she was honored with the Distinguished Scientist Award from the Hepatitis B Foundation and in 2011 received a Distinguished Service Award from the AASLD. In 2012, Lok was inducted into the Association of American Physicians. According to the annual ISI Web of Knowledge list published by Thomson Reuters, she has been one of the most cited scientific researchers since 2009.
