= Kathleen Potempa =

American nursing administrator

- Born: Michigan, US
- Spouse: Wayne

Academic background
- Education: RN, diploma, Providence Hospital School of Nursing; BSc, psychology, 1974, University of Detroit; MSN, 1978, DSN, 1986, Rush University
- Thesis: A comparison of exercise performance and fatigue in hypertensive men over 50 years of age taking propranolol and pindolol (1986)

Kathleen Marie Potempa is an American nursing administrator. In 2014, Potempa was one of six University of Michigan faculty members elected to the Institute of Medicine (now the National Academy of Medicine).

== Early life and education ==
Potempa was born and raised in Michigan alongside three sisters. Growing up, she was "raised to be an independent thinking person" by her parents, who also urged her to pursue career security. Following high school, she received her R.N. diploma in 1970 from Providence Hospital School of Nursing and a bachelor's degree in psychology from the University of Detroit Mercy. She later earned both a master's degree in nursing and a doctor of nursing science degree from Rush University.

During her career, Potempa was recognized with honorary degrees from Mahidol University and the SUNY Downstate Medical Center.

== Career ==
Upon graduating from Rush University, Potempa joined the faculty at the University of Illinois at Chicago's College of Nursing and her alma mater, Rush. Throughout her tenure at UIC, she was also director of their World Health Organization Collaborating Center for International Nursing Development in Primary Health Care. In 1994, Potempa was named the executive, associate dean of Oregon Health & Science University before being promoted to the rank of interim dean in 1995. During her time in Oregon, she focused her research on the benefits of aerobic exercise after suffering a stroke. As a result of her research, Potempa was elected secretary of the American Association of Colleges of Nursing (AACN) Board, having previously chaired their task force on distance technology in education.

Potempa eventually left Oregon to become the dean of nursing at the University of Michigan (UMich) in July 2006. While serving in this role, she was named AACN's President-Elect from 2008 to 2010 and President from 2010 to 2012. Upon stepping down as president, Potempa also concluded her four-year term on the National Institute of Nursing Research Council. In 2014, Potempa was one of six UMich faculty members elected to the Institute of Medicine (now the National Academy of Medicine). After serving as UMich's dean of nursing for 10 years, Potempa stepped down in 2015.

== Personal life ==
Potempa is married to Wayne, an engineer, and they have two children together.
