= Eve A. Kerr =

Academic background
- Education: BA, 1985, Washington University in St. Louis; MPH, University of California, Los Angeles; MD, 1989, University of California, San Francisco

Eve Askanas Kerr is an American physician-researcher. Kerr is a Full Professor of internal medicine and the inaugural Vice-Chair of Diversity, Equity, and Well-being at the University of Michigan.

== Early life and education ==
Kerr completed her Bachelor of Arts degree from Washington University in St. Louis, her Master's degree in Epidemiology from the University of California, Los Angeles (UCLA), and her medical degree from the University of California, San Francisco (UCSF). She also completed her internship and residency in internal medicine at UCLA.

== Career ==
Kerr joined the faculty of the University of Michigan's Department of Internal Medicine and the Ann Arbor VA Center for Clinical Management Research in 1996. In this role, she was the lead author on a study titled "Primary care physicians' satisfaction with quality of care in California capitated medical groups." She also helped lead two major studies that compared the quality of care given by VA against community care, largely focusing on organizational changes and performance profiling. In 2009, Kerr was elected a member of the American Society for Clinical Investigation.

In 2015, Kerr was the lead author of the landmark study "Stress testing before low-risk surgery: so many recommendations, so little overuse," which documented large deficits in United States quality of care. The following year, she earned the 2016 Under Secretary's Award for Outstanding Achievement in Health Services Research. Kerr was also elected to the National Academy of Medicine for "developing innovative, clinically meaningful methods to assess and improve quality of care, evaluating the influence of care processes on quality, and understanding the challenges of providing care to patients with multiple chronic conditions."

At the University of Michigan, Kerr was appointed the inaugural Vice-Chair of Diversity, Equity, and Well-being in 2019. She was also recognized by the American College of Physicians for her impact on the practice of internal medicine. During the COVID-19 pandemic, Kerr was the recipient of the John M. Eisenberg Award for Career Achievement in Research as a "senior member whose innovative research has changed the way in which research is conducted, patients are cared for, or students are educated."

== Personal life ==
Kerr is married and has two daughters.
