= Kristin Ann Hass =

American writer and professor

Academic background
- Education: Michigan (Ph.D., M.A., B.A.)
- Thesis: Remaking the nation with purple hearts and fishing lures: The Vietnam Veterans Memorial and American memory (1994)
- Doctoral advisor: David Scobey

Academic work
- Discipline: American Culture scholar
- Institutions: University of Michigan (1995–)

Kristin Ann Hass is an American writer and professor in the department of American Culture at the University of Michigan. She studies memorialization and public humanities.

== Education ==
After growing up in Northern California, Hass received her Bachelor of Arts and Master of Arts from the University of Michigan, as well as her Ph.D. in American Culture in 1994.

== Career ==
Hass is a professor in the department of American Culture at the University of Michigan. She is the faculty coordinator of the Michigan Humanities Collaboratory. She lectures, teaches, and writes about cultural memory, nationalism, memorialization, militarization, racialization, museums, visual culture, and material culture.

Hass was the co-founder and associate director of Imagining America, a national consortium of educators and activists dedicated to campus-community collaborations.

== Publications ==
Hass has written three books:

- Blunt Instruments: Recognizing Racist Infrastructure in Memorials, Museums, and Patriotic Practices (2023): A field guide for identifying elements of everyday landscapes and cultural practices that are designed to seem benign or natural but which work to maintain powerful structures of inequity.
- Sacrificing Soldiers on the National Mall (2013): A study of militarism, race, war memorials, and U.S. nationalism.
- Carried to the Wall: American Memory and the Vietnam Veterans Memorial (1998): An exploration of public memorial practices, material culture, and the legacies of the Vietnam War.

Hass is also the editor of Being Human During COVID (2021), a collection of essays written during the COVID-19 pandemic that try to make sense of the event through a humanities lens. It was published by the University of Michigan Press and is available online through open access.
