= Lisa Meeks =

Lisa M. Meeks is an American specialist in disabilities in health professions education and faculty at the University of Michigan Medical School. She has co-authored several articles in journals including The New England Journal of Medicine, The Lancet, JAMA (journal), and Academic Medicine (journal) and published books on the subject of disability in medical education, helping to inform policy and best practice. She is also creator of the web-based campaign #DocsWithDisabilities and host of the Docs With Disabilities Podcast. She also contributed to the formation of International Council on Disability Inclusion in Medical Education which aim to create shared standards regarding the support of qualified learners with disabilities in the medical profession that will serve as a benchmark for nations where rules on inclusion do not exist. Her work has been featured on NPR, the Washington Post, CNBC, in Slate, cleveland.com, Bloomberg Law, the Chicago Tribune and in The New Physician magazine from the American Medical Student Association (AMSA).

== Selected works ==
- Disability as diversity a guidebook for inclusion in medicine, nursing, and the health professions. Cham: Springer. 2020. ISBN 978-3-030-46187-4.
- Lisa Meeks and Neera Jain. Accessibility, Inclusion, and Action in Medical Education: Lived Experiences of Learners and Physicians with Disabilities (2018). University of California, San Francisco and Association of American Medical Colleges
- Lisa Meeks and Neera Jain. The Guide to Assisting Students With Disabilities: Equal Access in Health Science and Professional Education, 1st Ed(2016). Springer. ISBN 978-0-8261-2374-9

== Awards and honours ==
- 2018: Association for Higher Education and Disability (AHEAD) Award
- 2020: Harold R. Johnson Diversity Service Award
