= Leopoldo Pando Zayas =

Cuban-born physicist and string theorist

- Born: 1970 (age 55–56); Havana, Cuba
- Citizenship: USA, Cuban
- Education: Moscow State University
- Known for: String theory
- Awards: Silver Medal International Physics Olympiad
- Scientific career
- Fields: Physics
- Workplaces: University of Michigan

Leopoldo A. Pando Zayas is a physicist and string theorist. He is a professor in the Department of Physics at the University of Michigan, Ann Arbor.

== Education and career ==
Leopoldo Avelino Pando Zayas grew up in Cuba. In 1989, when he was a high school student, he won the Silver Medal in the International Physics Olympiad, which took place in Warsaw, Poland that year.

Pando Zayas received his Master of Science in physics in 1995, and his PhD in 1998, both from Moscow State University in Russia. He has held visiting appointments at the Institute for Advanced Study in Princeton, New Jersey; the Kavli Institute for Theoretical Physics at the University of California, Santa Barbara; and, as a staff associate, at the Abdus Salam International Center for Theoretical Physics (ICTP) in Trieste, Italy.

== Research and publications ==
Pando Zayas specializes in string theory with a focus on quantum gravity. He has published many articles on the gauge/gravity correspondence and has applied these techniques to the study of the dynamics of superconductors and strongly interacting fluids. His work has also elucidated the microscopic origin of the thermodynamics of black holes.

Pando Zayas translated a two-volume textbook on applications and methods in modern geometry, by B.A. Dubrovin, A.T. Fomenko, and S.P. Nóvikov, from Russian into Spanish. This book appeared as Geometría moderna: métodos y aplicationes (Moscow, 2000).
