= Erin Cech =

American sociologist and academic

Erin Ann Cech
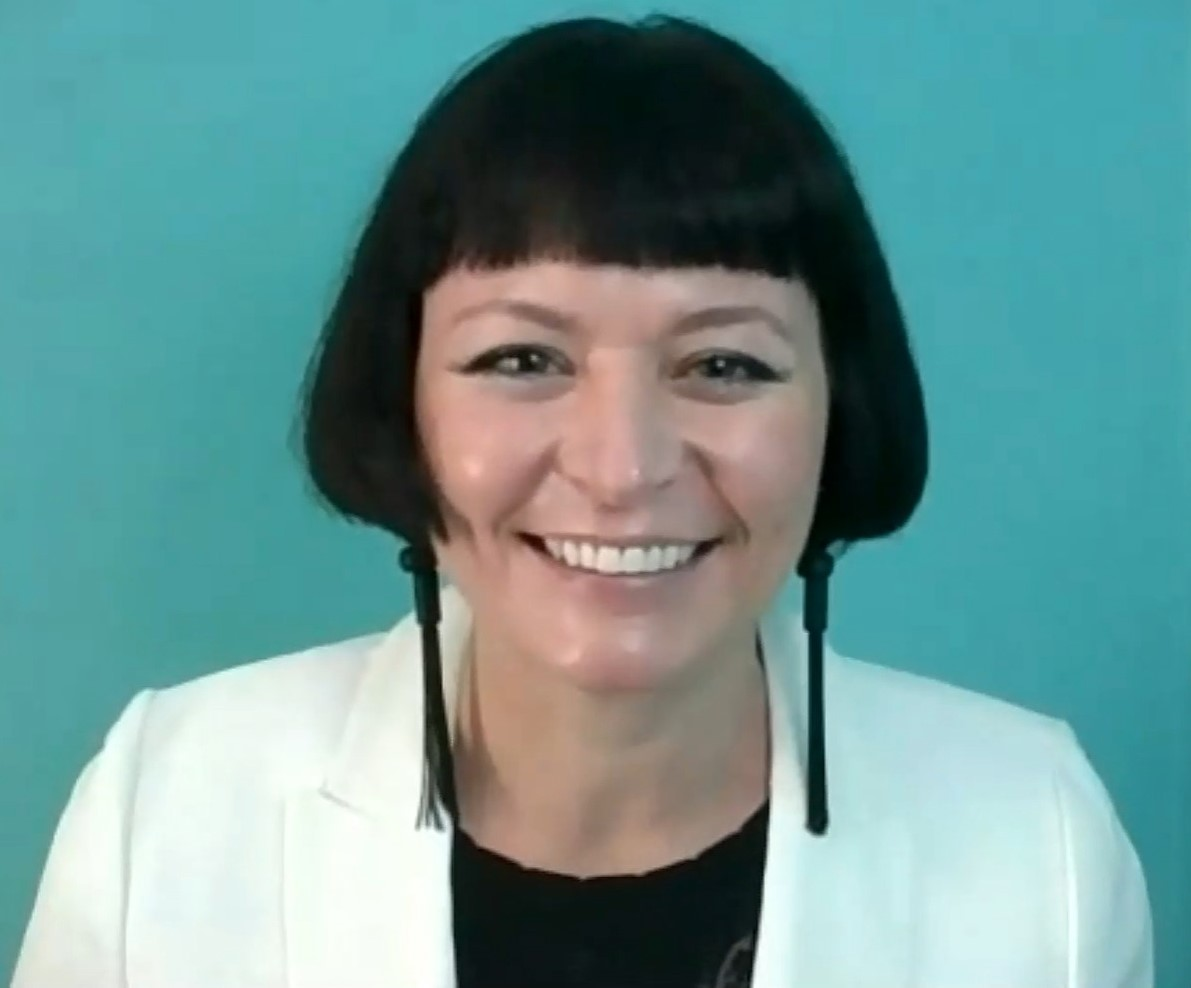
- Cech virtual lecture for the National Institutes of Health in 2021
- Education: University of California, San Diego; Montana State University
- Scientific career
- Workplaces: University of Michigan
- Thesis: The self-expressive edge of sex segregation: the role of gender schemas and self-conceptions in college major selection and career launch (2011)

Erin Ann Cech is an American sociologist who is an associate professor and director of undergraduate studies at the University of Michigan. Her research considers inequalities, gender and sexuality. Her first book, The Trouble with Passion: How Searching for Fulfilment at Work Fosters Inequality, was published in 2021.

== Early life and education ==
Cech was an undergraduate student at Montana State University, where she majored in electrical engineering and sociology. She was awarded the Women's Center Student of Achievement award in 2005 and served on the College of Engineering Women in Engineering Advisory Council. Cech has said that as a student who identified as LGBTQ+ in a highly masculine environment she became motivated to explore inequality in science and engineering. She moved to the University of California, San Diego for doctoral studies, where she studied the roles of gender schemas in major selection at college. Cech was a postdoctoral researcher at Stanford University, where she worked in the Clayman Institute for Gender Research.

== Research and career ==
Cech was appointed to the faculty at Rice University, then moved to the University of Michigan in 2016, where she studied inequality and how inequality is reproduced through various aspects of society. She has investigated the recruitment of people from historically marginalized groups (communities of color, LGBTQ+ people, women and gender minorities) and how workplace culture perpetuate this inequity. She has investigated how cultural assumptions can drive inequality, for example, the "passion principle", where people of certain genders are more likely to take on seemingly voluntary roles.

Cech showed that sparse family-leave policies in the United States meant that 43% of mothers who had scientific careers left the workforce after their first child.

During the COVID-19 pandemic, Cech studied job instability and workers' career decisions. She found that people's lives were so unsettled that they pursued nonfinancial properties instead of work. She found that people with unstable jobs prioritized passion for work over job security.

In 2022 Cech conducted a survey on 25,000 researchers working in STEM-related fields. Her findings revealed that straight, white, able-bodied men were more likely to be successful in scientific careers than people from other groups.

== Selected publications ==
- Cech, Erin A. (2021). The trouble with passion: how searching for fulfillment at work fosters inequality. Oakland, California. ISBN 978-0-520-30322-5. OCLC 1243351809.
- Cech, Erin; Rubineau, Brian; Silbey, Susan; Seron, Caroll (2011). "Professional Role Confidence and Gendered Persistence in Engineering". American Sociological Review. 76 (5): 641–666. doi:10.1177/0003122411420815. hdl:1721.1/70471. ISSN 0003-1224. S2CID 220261417.
- Cech, Erin A.; Waidzunas, Tom J. (2011). "Navigating the heteronormativity of engineering: the experiences of lesbian, gay, and bisexual students". Engineering Studies. 3 (1): 1–24. doi:10.1080/19378629.2010.545065. ISSN 1937-8629. S2CID 108694684.
- Cech, Erin A. (September 13, 2013). "Culture of Disengagement in Engineering Education?". Science, Technology, & Human Values. 39 (1): 42–72. doi:10.1177/0162243913504305. ISSN 0162-2439. S2CID 144697146.
