= Keith Riles =

American physicist

- Born: United States
- Education: University of California, Berkeley; Stanford University
- Scientific career
- Institutions: University of Michigan

Keith Riles is the H. Richard Crane Collegiate Professor of Physics at the University of Michigan. He is a member of the LIGO Scientific Collaboration which in 2015 discovered gravitational waves. His research includes cosmology and particle physics. He is a fellow of the American Physical Society and a member of the International Astronomical Union.

== Career ==
Keith Riles was born in Starkville, Mississippi in 1960, and grew up in New Orleans and Redondo Beach.

He earned his B.A. in physics from University of California, Berkeley in 1982, and his Ph.D. from Stanford in 1989. His PhD advisor was Martin Lewis Perl.

He worked as a postdoc at the University of California, Riverside from 1989 to 1991, then joined the faculty of the University of Michigan in 1992. He attained his collegiate professorship in 2018.

== Research ==
Dr. Riles's work includes both gravitational waves and elementary particle physics.

His work in particle physics was primarily on the L3 experiment at CERN, studying the W and Z bosons. He also used Large Electron-Positron Collider data to study the properties of tau leptons, B mesons, and W and Z bosons.

He leads the Michigan Gravitational Wave Group, which has used data from LIGO to search for gravitational waves from neutron stars, and currently has placed an upper limit on gravitational ripples from such neutron stars at better than one part in one trillion trillion (10^(-24)). Searches are now underway for isolated and binary neutron stars using algorithms developed by the University of Michigan group.

== Views ==
In December 2024, Riles spoke at a board meeting held by the Regents of the University of Michigan that discussed diversity, equity, and inclusion (DEI) initiatives for the University. He recommended that the Board of Regents eliminate all DEI initiatives, arguing that they are inherently discriminatory, and called the Black Lives Matter movement a "grift".

== Select publications ==
- Multi-Messenger Observations of a Binary Neutron Star Merger, Astrophys. J. Lett. 848, L12 (2017).
- All-sky Search for Periodic Gravitational Waves in the O1 LIGO Data, B. Abbott et al., Phys. Rev. D96, 062002 (2017).
- Observation of Gravitational Waves from a Binary Black Hole Merger, Phys. Rev. Lett. 116, 061102 (2016).
- First all-sky search for continuous gravitational waves from unknown sources in binary systems, Phys Rev. D 90, 06201 (2014).
- Gravitational Waves: Sources, Detectors and Searches (K. Riles), Prog. Part. Nucl. Phys. 68, 1 (2013).
- All-Sky Search for Periodic Gravitational Waves in the Full S5 LIGO Data (J. Abadie et al), Phys. Rev. D 85, 022001 (2012).
- An All-Sky Search Algorithm for Continuous Gravitational Waves from Spinning Neutron Stars in Binary Systems (E. Goetz and K. Riles), Class. Quant. Grav. 28, 215006 (2011).
