= Emily Mower Provost =

American computer scientist

Emily Mower Provost is a professor of computer science at the University of Michigan. She directs the Computational Human-Centered Artificial Intelligence (CHAI) Laboratory.

== Professional history ==
Provost received her B.S. in electrical engineering (summa cum laude and with thesis honors) from Tufts University in 2004, and her M.S. and Ph.D. in electrical engineering from the University of Southern California, Los Angeles, CA in 2007 and 2010, respectively. After postdoctoral research in the Signal Analysis and Interpretation Lab at the University of Southern California, Provost joined the Computer Science and Engineering Department of the University of Michigan in 2012.

In 2016 Provost was named associate editor for ACM Transactions on Multimedia and in 2017 was named associate editor for Computer Speech and Language Journal. She is on the editorial board of Affective Science, an associate editor for IEEE Open Journal of Signal Processing, and an associate editor for IEEE Transactions on Affective Computing since 2019.

== Research work ==
Provost directs the CHAI Laboratory at University of Michigan which focuses on behavior recognition from audio-visual speech. The laboratory has two main areas of study: emotion modeling (classification and perception) and assistive technology (aphasia and bipolar disorder). In her work Provost uses machine learning and signal processing to analyze speech, in order to understand human behavior. Her work at the Depression Center at the University of Michigan focuses on designing technology for people with bipolar disorder.

== Awards ==
- Toyota Faculty Scholar (2020)
- National Science Foundation CAREER Award (2017)
- Oscar Stern Award for Depression Research (2015)
- Herbert Kunzel Engineering Fellowship from USC (2007-2008, 2010-2011)
- Intel Research Fellowship (2008-2010)
- Achievement Rewards For College Scientists (ARCS) Award (2009-2010)
