= Anna Stefanopoulou =

Greek-American mechanical engineer

- Born: 1968 (age 57–58)
- Education: Michigan (Ph.D.); National Technical University of Athens
- Awards: IEEE Control System Technology Award (2016); ASME Gustus L. Larson Memorial Award (2009)
- Scientific career
- Fields: Electrical Engineering
- Workplaces: Michigan (2000–); UC Santa Barbara (1998–2000)
- Thesis: Modeling and control of advanced technology engines (1996)
- Doctoral advisor: Jessy W. Grizzle

Anna Stefanopoulou is an a Greek-American mechanical engineer known for her research on the control theory of fuel cells and on improving the fuel efficiency of automotive engines. She is William Clay Ford Professor of Technology in the department of mechanical engineering at the University of Michigan, director of the University of Michigan Energy Institute, and a member of the University of Michigan President's Commission on Carbon Neutrality.

== Education and career ==
Stefanopoulou studied marine engineering at the National Technical University of Athens, studying ship propulsion and graduating with a diploma in 1991. She moved to the University of Michigan for graduate study, beginning with a master's degree in marine engineering but then shifting to electrical engineering and computer science, as she became more interested in automotive applications of control theory.

After completing her Ph.D. in 1996, she worked on engine control for the Ford Motor Company from 1996 to 1997. In 1998 she became an assistant professor of mechanical and environmental engineering at the University of California, Santa Barbara, where she developed an additional line of research on automated braking, and was chosen as one of the participants in a prestigious National Academy of Engineering "Frontiers of Engineering" symposium. In 2000 she returned to the University of Michigan as an associate professor of mechanical engineering, and began the work on fuel cells for which she is best known.

== Book ==
Stefanopoulou is the co-author, with Jay T. Pukrushpan and Huei Peng, of the book Control of Fuel Cell Power Systems: Principles, Modeling, Analysis and Feedback Design (Springer, 2004).

== Recognition ==
Stefanopoulou was named a fellow of the American Society of Mechanical Engineers in 2007. In 2009 she became an IEEE Fellow, "for contributions to control of energy conversion systems". She became a fellow of SAE International (formerly the Society of Automotive Engineers) in 2018.

In 2009, the American Society of Mechanical Engineers gave Stefanopoulou their Gustus L. Larson Memorial Award for outstanding achievement in mechanical engineering. In 2016 the IEEE Control Systems Society gave her their Control System Technology Award "for the development of an advanced battery management system accounting for electro-thermo-mechanical phenomena".

The University of Michigan named Stefanopoulou to the William Clay Ford Professorship in 2017.
