= Thomas L. Schwenk =

American physician

Thomas L. Schwenk (born 1949) retired August 31, 2021 as dean of the School of Medicine at the University of Nevada, and vice president of health sciences at the University of Nevada, Reno. He now holds the position of Dean Emeritus at the University of Nevada, Reno, as well as an appointment as Professor Emeritus at the University of Michigan Medical School.

Schwenk earned his M.D. degree in 1975 from the University of Michigan Medical School, and in 1978 completed his Family Medicine Residency at the University of Utah Affiliated Hospitals in Salt Lake City, Utah. In 2002 he was elected to the National Academy of Medicine, formerly known as the Institute of Medicine of the United States National Academy of Sciences. He served as a Member of the Board of Directors of the American Board of Family Medicine from 2000-2005 (Vice President 2004-2005). He served as a member of national advisory committee for the Robert Wood Johnson Foundation Generalist Physician Faculty Scholars Program, as well as a member of the Vision for the Future Commission of the American Board of Medical Specialties, a national 25-member commission charged with making recommendations about physician continuing certification. Most recently, he received the Distinguished Alumni Achievement Award from the University of Michigan Medical School Alumni Association in October 2025.

Schwenk spent much of his career at the University of Michigan. He joined the faculty of the Department of Family Medicine in 1984, was appointed interim chair of the department in 1986, and was named permanent chair in 1988. He also served as a professor in the Department of Medical Education and as associate director of the University of Michigan Depression Center. In June 2007 he was installed as the first George A. Dean, M.D., Chair of Family Medicine, the department's first endowed professorship. Dean is a family physician in Southfield, Michigan, and a former president of the Michigan Academy of Family Physicians. In July 2011 Schwenk left Michigan to become dean of the University of Nevada School of Medicine.

During his service as Dean, School of Medicine and Vice-President for Health Sciences, University of Nevada, Reno, he focused on restructuring the school as a full four-year campus based in Reno, with a strong outreach to rural Nevada, including a budding regional campus in Elko. Prior to his retirement, he was responsible for finalizing and receiving from the Nevada System of Higher Education Board of Regents approval of a high-level partnership and integration with Renown Health, a community-governed, not-for-profit health system in northern Nevada. He was elected to the Administrative Board of the AAMC Council of Deans from 2017-2021.

He is board certified in Family Medicine. His research focuses on depression, burnout and mental health in medical students, residents and physicians. His clinical interests include nutritional supplements, ergogenic aids in sports, and issues related to depression and mental illness in primary care.His recent publications and speaking, including several viewpoints and editorials in JAMA, have focused on burnout and physician well-being.
