= Nilton de Oliveira Rennó =

Planetary scientist

- Occupations: Planetary scientist, systems engineer, and academic

Academic background
- Education: B.S., Civil Engineering; Ph.D. Atmospheric Sciences
- Alma mater: State University of Campinas; Massachusetts Institute of Technology

Academic work
- Institutions: University of Michigan University of Arizona; California Institute of Technology Massachusetts Institute of Technology

Nilton de Oliveira Rennó is a planetary scientist, systems engineer and academic. He is a professor of Climate and Space Sciences and Engineering (CLASP) at the University of Michigan.

Rennó's research focuses on thermodynamics, atmospheric science, astrobiology, more specifically, the possibility of liquid saline water and life on Mars, and space debris.

== Education ==
Rennó completed his Bachelor's in Civil Engineering at the State University of Campinas (Unicamp) in 1983 and a Ph.D. in Atmospheric Sciences from the Massachusetts Institute of Technology (MIT) in 1992. Afterwards, he was a research fellow in planetary sciences at the California Institute of Technology (Caltech).

== Career ==
Rennó began his academic career in 1995 as an assistant professor for the Department of Atmospheric Sciences at the University of Arizona. Between 2001 and 2002, he was promoted to associate professor and moved to the Department of Planetary Sciences. At the University of Michigan, he worked as an associate professor of Atmospheric, Oceanic, and Space Sciences from 2002 to 2008. In 2008, he became a full professor of Aerospace Engineering and Climate and Space Sciences and Engineering. He has been the director of the Master of Engineering in Space Engineering Program since 2012.

Rennó has been involved with NASA as a member of the Mars Missions. From 2007 to 2008, he was a co-investigator for the Phoenix Mars mission, and was one of its leaders. Subsequently, he became a co-investigator of the Mars Science Laboratory that landed on the surface of Mars in 2011 and is still operational.

Rennó has contributed to review panels for NASA's Earth Science Technology Office (ESTO) as well as its Mars, Discovery, and Planetary Mission programs. He has served as CEO and CTO of Electric Field Solutions (EFS) between 2011 and 2015 and as CTO of Intelligent Vision Systems (IVS) since 2016. At EFS, he contributed to the development of an electric field sensor and led the acquisition of IVS by the Willbros Group. At IVS, he and his colleagues developed a new aircraft icing detection system, which was tested successfully in 2024 during the Sensors and Certifiable Hybrid Architectures for Safer Aviation in Icing Environments (SENS4ICE) campaign in the United States.

Rennó has also been involved with the National Academies of Sciences, Engineering, and Medicine as a member of the Committee on Science Strategy for Human Exploration of Mars and the Committee on Strategy to Search for Life in the Universe.

== Research ==
Rennó's research covers atmospheric science, thermodynamics, and systems engineering, with applications to planetary environments and astrobiology. In his early research he proposed a thermodynamic model for Convective Available Potential Energy (CAPE), treating convection as a heat engine and linking CAPE to variations in climate.

Rennó and his collaborators examined tropical and Amazonian data to study relationships between CAPE, boundary layer moist entropy, lightning, and aerosol concentrations. His colleagues compared cloud microphysics and aerosol properties between the Amazon basin and remote oceanic regions during clean wet-season periods.

Rennó developed a thermodynamic framework for dust devils and generalized it for tornadoes. He supervised the creation of the COMSALT model for steady-state saltation, which incorporates factors such as gravity and drag affecting particle motion. Rennó's research on Mars has focused on the analysis of meteorological and geochemical data from missions including Curiosity and Phoenix. He contributed to studies reporting evidence of past water activity and potential habitability on Martian rocks in areas such as the Yellowknife Bay formation, and examined Martian soil and ice for indicators of liquid water. His work also explored Martian dust storms and the presence of strong oxidants on Mars.

In systems engineering, Rennó focused on the development of instruments and analysis of data from space missions, including the Radiation Assessment Detector and the Rover Environmental Monitoring System. He has also been involved in climate simulations using the AIMP model to investigate large-scale atmospheric variability.

Rennó has invented and led the development of a new type of aircraft icing detection system that measures cloud drop size, total water content, ice accretion on aircraft surfaces, and detects hazardous ice crystals by using elevated radon as convective-updraft indicator, then performing targeted spectral sensing to confirm particulate presence and provide alerts or automatic responses.

== Awards and honors ==
- 2012 – Best Invention of the Year, Time Tech
- 2013 – Award for Excellence, AIAA Foundation
- 2013 – John L. "Jack" Swigert Jr. Award for Space Exploration, Space Foundation

== Selected articles ==
- Slingo, J.M.; Sperber, K.R.; Boyle, J.S.; Ceron, J.P.; Dix, M.; Dugas, B.; Ebisuzaki, W (1996). "Intraseasonal oscillations in 15 atmospheric general circulation models: results from an AMIP diagnostic subproject". Climate Dynamics. 12 (5): 325–357. Bibcode:1996ClDy...12..325S. doi:10.1007/BF00231106.
- Smith, P.H.; Tamppari, L.K.; Arvidson, R.E.; Bass, D.; Blaney, D.; Boynton, W.V.; Carswell, A.; Catling, D.C.; Clark, B.C.; Zent, A.P. (2009). "H2O at the Phoenix Landing Site". Science. 325 (5936): 58–61. doi:10.1126/science.1172339. PMID 19574383.
- Hassler, Donald M.; Zeitlin, Cary; Wimmer-Schweingruber, Robert F.; Ehresmann, Bent; Rafkin, Scot; Eigenbrode, Jennifer L.; Brinza, David E.; Weigle, Gerald; Böttcher, Stephan; Moores, John E. (2013). "Mars' Surface Radiation Environment Measured with the Mars Science Laboratory's Curiosity Rover". Science. 343 (6169) 1244797. doi:10.1126/science.1244797. hdl:1874/309142. PMID 24324275.
- Grotzinger, J.P.; Sumner, D.Y.; Kah, L.C.; Stack, K.; Gupta, S.; Edgar, L.; Rubin, D.; Lewis, K.; Schieber, J.; Moores, J.E. (2013). "A habitable fluvio-lacustrine environment at Yellowknife Bay, Gale Crater, Mars". Science. 343 (6169) 1242777. doi:10.1126/science.1242777. PMID 24324272.
- Vaniman, D.T.; Bish, D.L.; Ming, D.W.; Bristow, T.F.; Morris, R.V.; Blake, D.F.; Chipera, S.J.; Morrison, S.M.; Treiman, A.H.; Rampe, E.B.; Rice, M.; Achilles, C.N.; Grotzinger, J.P.; McLennan, S.M.; Williams, J.; Bell, J.F.; Newsom, H.E.; Downs, R.T.; Maurice, S.; Sarrazin, P.; Yen, A.S.; Morookian, J.M.; Farmer, J.D.; Stack, K.; Milliken, R.E.; Ehlmann, B.L.; Sumner, D.Y.; Berger, G.; Crisp, J.A.; Hurowitz, J.A.; Anderson, R.; Des Marais, D.J.; Stolper, E.M.; Edgett, K.S.; Gupta, S.; Spanovich, N. (2014). "Mineralogy of a mudstone at Yellowknife Bay, Gale crater, Mars". Science. 343 (6169) 1243480. Bibcode:2014Sci...343B.386V. doi:10.1126/science.1243480. PMID 24324271.
