= Carolyn Kuranz =

American physicist

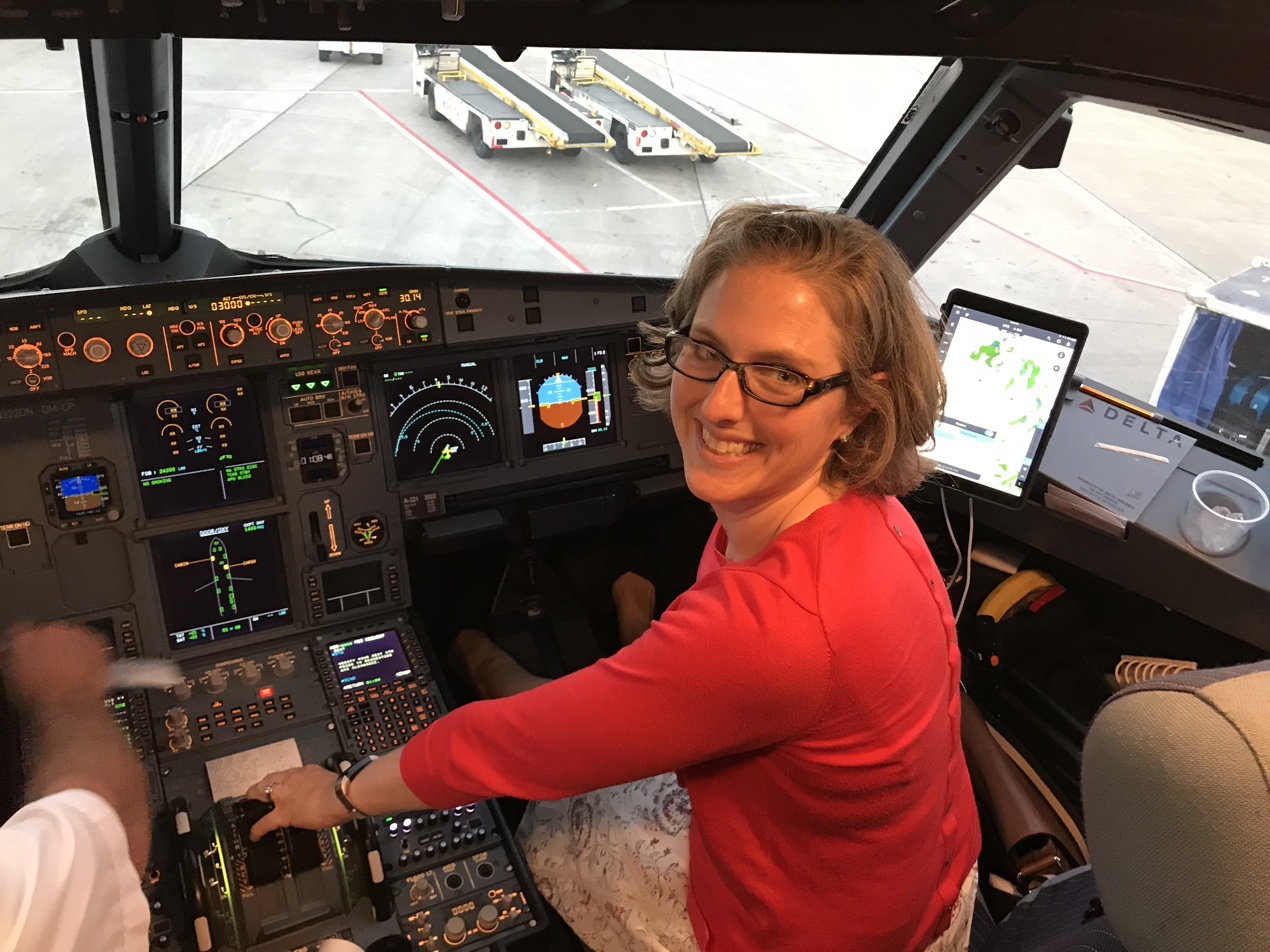
- Education: University of Michigan (Ph. D.); Bryn Mawr College
- Scientific career
- Fields: Plasma physics
- Workplaces: University of Michigan
- Thesis: Blast-Wave-Driven, Multidimensional Rayleigh-Taylor Instability Experiments (2009)
- Doctoral advisor: R. Paul Drake

Carolyn C. Kuranz is an American plasma physicist whose research involves the use of high-powered lasers at the National Ignition Facility both to help develop inertial confinement fusion and to study how matter behaves in conditions similar to those in shock waves in astrophysics. She is an associate professor at the University of Michigan, in the Department of Nuclear Engineering and Radiological Sciences.

== Education and career ==
Kuranz majored in physics at Bryn Mawr College, advised there by Peter Beckman, and graduated with honors in 2002. She went to the University of Michigan for graduate study in applied physics, where she earned a master's degree in 2004 and completed her Ph.D. in 2009, under the supervision of R. Paul Drake.

She remained at the University of Michigan as a researcher in the Center for Radiative Shock Hydrodynamics, beginning in 2009. In 2019, she moved to a faculty position in the Department of Nuclear Engineering and Radiological Sciences. She is also affiliated with the Department of Climate and Space Sciences and Engineering.

In 2020, she was named to the national Fusion Energy Sciences Advisory Committee, an advisory committee to the United States Department of Energy.

== Recognition ==
Kuranz was named a Fellow of the American Physical Society (APS) in 2019, after a nomination from the APS Division of Plasma Physics, "for spearheading academic use of the National Ignition Facility for seminal experiments in plasma laboratory astrophysics, specifically the effects of locally generated intense radiation on an interface and on astrophysically relevant interfacial instabilities". In 2023 she was awarded the Faculty Achievement Award by the University of Michigan’s Rackham Graduate School for outstanding dedication to advancing understanding of the universe through her work in laboratory astrophysics.
