= Weiping Zou =

Professor of pathology, immunology, biology, and surgery

Weiping Zou MD, PhD
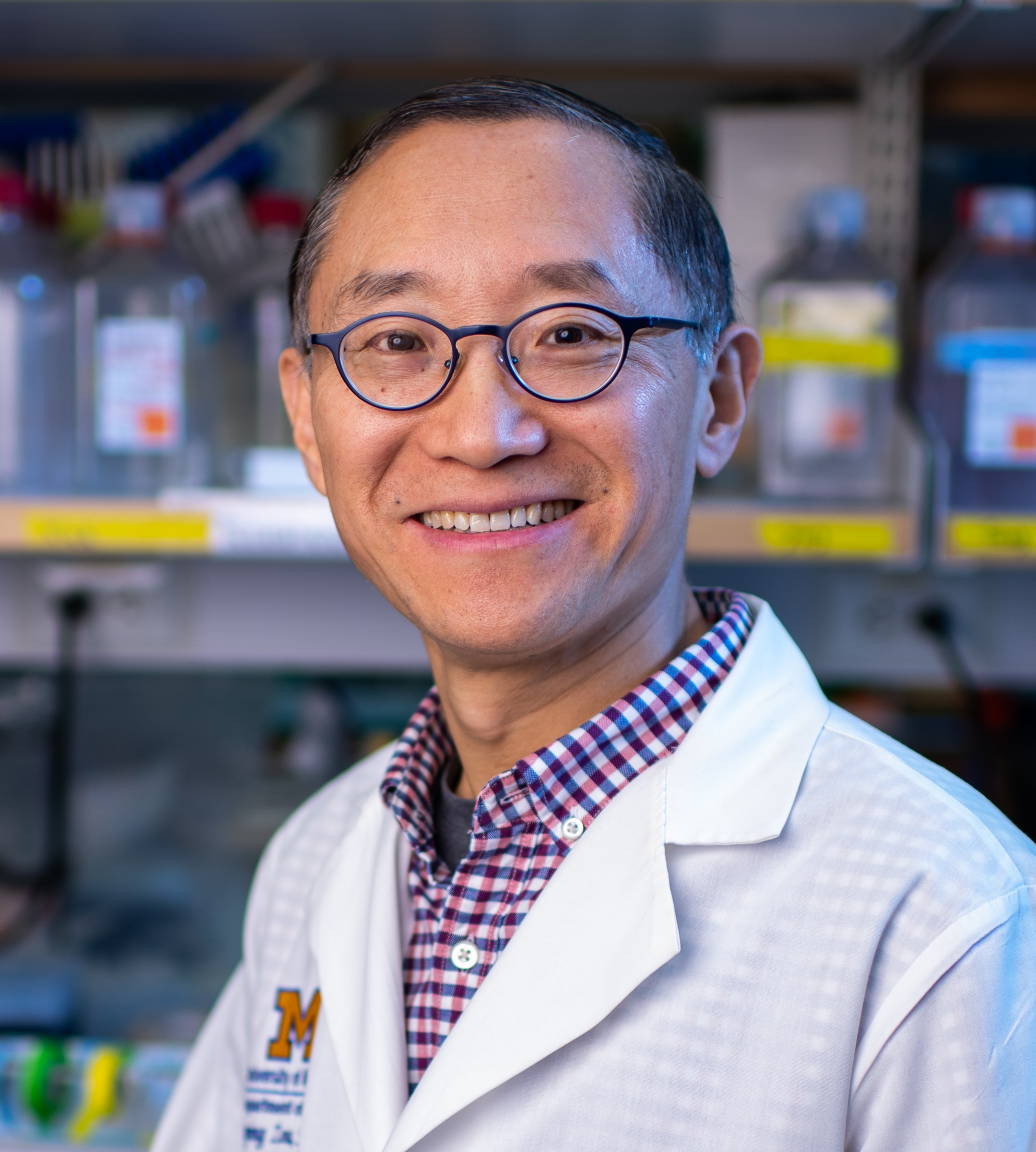
- Employer: University of Michigan
- Title: Charles B. de Nancrede Professor

Weiping Zou (born 1965, Chinese: 邹伟平) is the Charles B. de Nancrede Professor of Pathology, Immunology, Biology, and Surgery at the University of Michigan. He is a scientist noted for his work regarding understanding the nature of human tumor immune responses and developing mechanism-informed combination therapies for cancer. He has developed an international reputation in human tumor immunosuppressive mechanisms in the tumor microenvironment.

== Career ==
Zou serves as Director of the Center of Excellence for Cancer Immunology and Immunotherapy, co-director of the Cancer Hematopoiesis and Immunology Program, and directs the Immunologic Monitoring Core at the University of Michigan Medical School and University of Michigan Rogel Cancer Center. He also directs the Surgical Oncology Fellow Training (T32) program, through which clinical fellows are trained to become physician scientists, with a focus on cancer immunology and immunotherapy. At the national level, he is the American Association for Cancer Research Cancer Immunology (CIMM) Chairperson 2019-2020 and has served as the Abstract Programming Chair for the American Association of Immunologists for 4 years.

He has delivered more than 300 invited lectures at different institutions and conferences and has published nearly 200 articles and book chapters - including 38 articles in Nature, Science, and Cell journal series. His laboratory is one of the most cited research teams in the field of immunology and their work has been highlighted by many scientific news agencies. “Specific recruitment of regulatory T cells in ovarian carcinoma fosters immune privilege and predicts reduced survival”, an original work on human Tregs, has been cited more than 5,000 times since its publication.

== Recent Publications ==
1. Yu J. et al. Progestogen-driven B7-H4 contributes to onco-fetal immune tolerance. Cell, doi:10.1016/j.cell.2024.06.012 (2024).
2. Pitter M. et al. PAD4 controls tumor immunity via restraining the MHC class II machinery in macrophages. Cell Reports, doi: 10.1016/j.celrep.2024.113942 (2024).
1. Lo BC. et al. Microbiota-dependent activation of CD4(+) T cells induces CTLA-4 blockade-associated colitis via Fcgamma receptors. Science, doi:10.1126/science.adh8342 (2024).
2. Liao, P., et al. CD8(+) T cells and fatty acids orchestrate tumor ferroptosis and immunity via ACSL4. Cancer Cell, doi:10.1016/j.ccell.2022.02.003(2022).
3. Zhou, J. et al. 2021. The ubiquitin ligase MDM2 sustains STAT5 stability to control T cell-mediated antitumor immunity. Nat Immunol, doi:10.1038/s41590-021-00888-3 (2021).
4. Yu, J. et al. Liver metastasis restrains immunotherapy efficacy via macrophage-mediated T cell elimination. Nat Med, doi:10.1038/s41591-020-1131-x (2021).
5. Lin, H. et al. Stanniocalcin 1 is a phagocytosis checkpoint driving tumor immune resistance. Cancer Cell, doi:10.1016/j.ccell.2020.12.023 (2021).
6. Li, G. et al. LIMIT is an immunogenic lncRNA in cancer immunity and immunotherapy. Nat Cell Biol, doi:10.1038/s41556-021-00672-3 (2021).
7. Du, W. et al. Loss of optineurin drives cancer immune evasion via palmitoylation-dependent IFNGR1 lysosomal sorting and degradation. Cancer Discov, doi:10.1158/2159-8290.CD-20-1571 (2021).
8. Bian, Y. et al. Cancer SLC43A2 alters T cell methionine metabolism and histone methylation. Nature, doi:10.1038/s41586-020-2682-1 (2020).
9. Wang, W. et al. CD8+ T cells regulate tumour ferroptosis during cancer immunotherapy. Nature, doi:10.1038/s41586-019-1170-y (2019).
10. Lin, H. et al. Host expression of PD-L1 determines efficacy of PD-L1 pathway blockade-mediated tumor regression. J Clin Invest, doi:10.1172/JCI96113 (2018).
11. Maj, T. et al. Oxidative stress controls regulatory T cell apoptosis and suppressor activity and PD-L1-blockade resistance in tumor. Nat Immunol, doi:10.1038/ni.3868 (2017).
12. Wang, W., et al. Effector T Cells Abrogate Stroma-Mediated Chemoresistance in Ovarian Cancer. Cell, doi:10.1016/j.cell.2016.04.009 (2016).
13. Zhao, E., et al. Cancer mediates effector T cell dysfunction by targeting microRNAs and EZH2 via glycolysis restriction. Nature immunology, doi:10.1038/ni.3313 (2016).
14. Peng, D., et al. Epigenetic silencing of TH1-type chemokines shapes tumour immunity and immunotherapy. Nature, doi: 10.1038/nature15520 (2015).
15. Kryczek, I., et al. IL-22(+)CD4(+) T cells promote colorectal cancer stemness via STAT3 transcription factor activation and induction of the methyltransferase DOT1L. Immunity, doi:10.1016/j.immuni.2014.03.010 (2014).
16. Cui, T. X., et al. Myeloid-derived suppressor cells enhance stemness of cancer cells by inducing microRNA101 and suppressing the corepressor CtBP2. Immunity 39, 611–621, doi:10.1016/j.immuni.2013.08.025 (2013).
17. Kryczek, I., et al. Human TH17 Cells Are Long-Lived Effector Memory Cells. Sci Transl Med, doi:10.1126/scitranslmed.3002949 (2011).
18. Curiel, T. J. et al. Specific recruitment of regulatory T cells in ovarian carcinoma fosters immune privilege and predicts reduced survival. Nat Med, doi:10.1038/nm1093 (2004).
19. Curiel, T. J. et al. Blockade of B7-H1 improves myeloid dendritic cell-mediated antitumor immunity. Nat Med, doi:10.1038/nm863 (2003).
- Additional Publications
