= Henry L. Paulson =

American neurologist

Academic background
- Education: MD, PhD, cell biology, Yale University

Henry Lauris Paulson is an American neurologist.

== Early life and education ==
Paulson received his medical degree and doctorate in cell biology from Yale University in 1990. He then completed a neurology residency and neurogenetics/movement disorders fellowship at the University of Pennsylvania.

== Career ==
In 1997, Paulson joined the faculty at the University of Iowa where he established his own laboratory to describe abnormal protein aggregates in polyglutamine diseases. His lab has helped pioneer the use of gene silencing methods as a potential therapy for the many neurological disorders caused by mutant genes. In 2007, Paulson left Iowa upon accepting a faculty appointment at the University of Michigan.

During his tenure at the University of Michigan, Paulson has continued to explore the reasons why the aging brain degenerates in neurodegenerative diseases.

He assumed directorship of the Michigan Alzheimer’s Disease Center in 2015. The Michigan Alzheimer’s Disease Center (MADC) is a National Institute of Aging-funded center dedicated to the research and understanding of Alzheimer’s disease and related dementias. Under his leadership, the MADC was the first of its kind to expand beyond its home institution to formally collaborate with two other research universities in the state, making the MADC a statewide organization. This ground-breaking initiative brought together expertise from the University of Michigan, Michigan State University, and Wayne State University to tackle the understanding of dementia in an interdisciplinary manner and extend outreach and education efforts throughout the state.

In recognition of his research, Paulson was elected a Fellow of the American Association for the Advancement of Science for his efforts towards advancing science applications. In 2020, he was elected to the National Academy of Medicine for his "work in making fundamental discoveries regarding protein aggregation and nucleotide repeat expansions as causes of neurodegenerative diseases, and pioneering novel therapeutic strategies, including nucleotide-based gene silencing and harnessing the cell’s own quality-control machinery, for this group of devastating disorders." Following his election, Paulson was named the interim co-director of the Michigan Neuroscience Institute.
