= Odest Chadwicke Jenkins =

Researcher

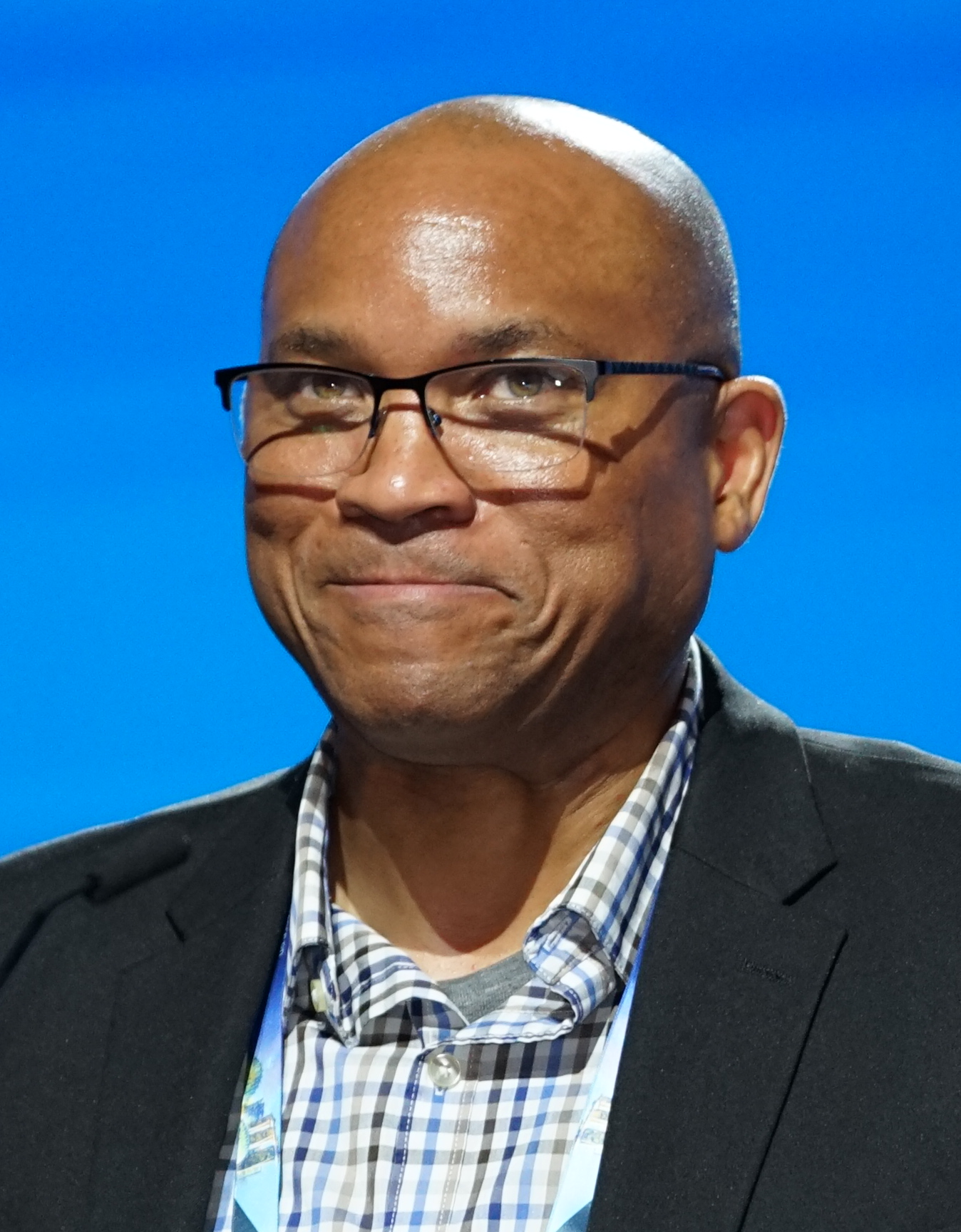
- Jenkins at AAAI 2026
- Born: 1974 (age 51–52)
- Education: Alma College; Georgia Tech; University of Southern California
- Scientific career
- Workplaces: University of Michigan; University of Southern California; Brown University
- Thesis: Data-driven Derivation of Skills for Autonomous Humanoid Agents (2003)
- Doctoral advisor: Maja Matarić

Odest Chadwicke Jenkins (born 1974) is an American computer scientist who is Professor of Computer Science at the University of Michigan. Jenkins works on human–computer interaction and the design of robotic systems that learn from demonstration. He was awarded the Presidential Early Career Award for Scientists and Engineers in 2006 and made a Fellow of the American Association for the Advancement of Science in 2019.

== Early life and education ==
Jenkins enjoyed playing Atari as a child and wanted to become a videogame designer. He became aware of Alma College because his mother worked with former President Alan Stone. Jenkins studied computer science and mathematics at Alma College. In 1993, he was inducted onto the Alma College Dean's List, and in 1996 won the Senior Leadership Award. Together with his classmate, Jim Blum, Jenkins set up the first Alma College web server in 1997. He moved to Georgia Tech for his graduate studies in computer science, working with Jessica Hodgins on simulations of basketball shooting. Jenkins moved to the University of Southern California for his doctoral studies in computer science, where he worked with Maja Matarić on humanoid agents. He completed his doctorate in 2003 and was appointed as a postdoctoral researcher.

== Research and career ==
In 2004 Jenkins joined Brown University as an assistant professor. In 2006 he was awarded a Presidential Early Career Award for Scientists and Engineers for his work on autonomous robot control and perception. Here he created a Robot Operating System (ROS) repository to improve reproducibility and interoperability of his robotic systems. He was promoted to associate professor in 2010. In 2013 Jenkins was made a National Geographic explorer. In 2015 Jenkins joined the Computer Science and Engineering Division of the University of Michigan where he was made a professor in Michigan's Robotics Institute.

Jenkins works on robot Learning from Demonstration (LfD), which looks to automate the processes behind human decision making and movement. Robots that are trained using LfD learn from user demonstration (as opposed to learning explicitly from a computer program). For example, Jenkins taught a robot to do the Cabbage Patch by programming it to watch dance moves and then attempt to replicate them. Jenkins uses manifold learning (nonlinear dimensionality reduction) to identify dynamic processes and the fundamental structures of time series data. Jenkins has demonstrated LfD for the control of humanoid robots, the control of prosthetics and vision-based human tracking. He looks to improve public access to high quality robotic systems. With Henry Evans, a gentleman paralysed by stroke, Jenkins delivered a TED Talk on how robotics can benefit humanity. Jenkins created a quadrotor drone that allowed Evans to see parts of the world that had previously been inaccessible to him.

Jenkins has called for more African Americans to get involved with robotics, and for people to be more aware of whether everyone is being given equal opportunities in education and academia. He has supported students from underrepresented backgrounds in their participation at the Tapia Conference for the Celebration of Diversity in Computing. Jenkins led organisation of the Conference for African-Americans in the Mathematical Sciences. In 2019 he was elected a Fellow of the American Association for the Advancement of Science.

== Awards and honours ==
- 2006 Presidential Early Career Award for Scientists and Engineers
- 2011 Popular Science Brilliant 10
- 2013 National Geographic Emerging Explorer
- 2015 Brown University Karen T. Romer Prize for Undergraduate Advising and Mentoring
- 2017 University of Michigan Trudy Huebner Service Excellence Award
- 2019 Fellow of the American Association for the Advancement of Science
- 2021 Fellow of the Association for the Advancement of Artificial Intelligence
- 2025 ACM Fellow

== Selected publications ==
- Jenkins, Odest Chadwicke (January 1, 2002). "Automated derivation of primitives for movement classification". Autonomous Robots. 12: 39–54. doi:10.1023/A:1013254724861. S2CID 8566242.
- Jenkins, Odest Chadwicke (July 4, 2004). "A spatio-temporal extension to Isomap nonlinear dimension reduction". Twenty-first international conference on Machine learning - ICML '04. pp. 39–54. doi:10.1145/1015330.1015357. ISBN 978-1-58113-838-2. S2CID 1323352.
- Grollman, Daniel H.; Jenkins, Odest Chadwicke (April 10, 2007). "Dogged Learning for Robots". Proceedings 2007 IEEE International Conference on Robotics and Automation. pp. 2483–2488. doi:10.1109/ROBOT.2007.363692. ISBN 978-1-4244-0602-9. S2CID 8905292.

Jenkins serves on the editorial board of the ACM Transactions on Computer-Human Interaction.
