= Marita G. Titler =

American nurse scholar

- Born: Springville, Iowa, US
- Spouse: Craig Titler (m. 1974)

Academic background
- Education: BS, 1974, Mount Mercy University; MSN, 1978, PhD, 1992, University of Iowa College of Nursing
- Thesis: Functional health status of people with chronic interstitital lung disease (1992)

Academic work
- Institutions: University of Michigan; University of Iowa Hospitals and Clinics

Marita Gerianne Titler (nee Ball) is an American nurse scholar. She is the Rhetaugh G. Dumas Endowed Chair in the University of Michigan's School of Nursing.

== Early life and education ==
Titler was born to Eugene Ball in Springville, Iowa. While attending high school, she was the recipient of the Springvilie Monday Club's $400 nursing scholarship to attend Mount Mercy University. Titler graduated from Mount Mercy in 1974 with the Mary Catherine McAuley award as their top graduating senior.

Following her graduation, Titler accepted a faculty position teaching medical-surgical nursing at Mount Mercy University. She then returned to school to earn her Master's degree in nursing from the University of Iowa before joining the University of Iowa Hospitals and Clinics.

== Career ==
In 1991, Titler received the Teresa E. Christy Award as a "nurse who has demonstrated professional commitment to the improvement of health care and has demonstrated the interrelationship of nursing education, nursing practice, and nursing research." A few years later, she became the associate director of Nursing Research and Clinical Nurse Specialist, II, Critical Care, at the University of Iowa Hospitals and Clinics. As a result of her research, Titler became a member of the National Advisory Council for the Agency for Healthcare Research and Quality from 2000 to 2003 and she co-published The Iowa Model of Evidence-Based Practice to Promote Quality Care.

Upon joining the faculty at the University of Michigan's School of Nursing (UMSN) in 2009, Titler became the Associate Dean for Practice and Clinical Scholarship and Rhetaugh G. Dumas Endowed Chair. In 2010, she was appointed to the Institute of Medicine's Committee on Standards for Developing Trustworthy Clinical Practice Guidelines. Later that year, she was also the inaugural winner of the Friends of the National Institute of Nursing Research President's Award. She received the award for her work in "translating evidence to nursing practice and the development of translation science." By 2013, Titler was honored with the Distinguished Alumni Award from the University of Iowa for her achievements in science and health care.

In 2015, Titler was elected a member of the National Academy of Medicine for her research on outcomes effectiveness and implementation science. Following her election, she stepped down as UMSN's Chair of the Systems, Populations, and Leadership department, to spend more time on her scholarship and research, and was replaced by Rob Stephenson. In January 2020, Titler's co-authored book Evidence-based Practice for Nursing and Healthcare Quality placed third in the American Journal of Nursing's 2019 Book of the Year Awards in the Advanced Practice category.

== Personal life ==
Titler married her husband Craig in 1974 and they have two children together.
