= James Jackson (psychologist) =

American psychologist (1944–2020)

James S. Jackson
- Born: 1944; Detroit, Michigan, U.S.
- Died: 2020 (aged 75–76)
- Education: Michigan State University; University of Toledo (MS); Wayne State University (PhD)
- Known for: National Survey of American Life (NSAL); Studies on the psychology of race, culture, and minority health disparities
- Awards: James McKeen Cattell Fellow Award (2006)
- Scientific career
- Fields: Social psychology
- Institutions: University of Michigan

James S. Jackson (1944 – September 1, 2020) was an American social psychologist and the Daniel Katz Distinguished University Professor of Psychology at the University of Michigan. Jackson was also a member of the National Science Board and a past president of the Association of Black Psychologists. He studied the psychology of race and culture and the impact of racial disparities on minority health.

== Biography ==
=== Early life ===
Jackson was born in Detroit. He attended Michigan State University with the intention of becoming an engineer, but he found himself interested in psychology after being exposed to an introductory course on the subject. Jackson was president of his school's Alpha Phi Alpha chapter and he made friends with civil rights leader Robert L. Green through the fraternity. His friendship with Green introduced him to civil rights figures, including Malcolm X and Jesse Jackson, and to other notable people, including Jimmy Hoffa.

=== Career ===
After completing a master's degree at the University of Toledo, Jackson entered doctoral study in psychology at Wayne State University. He became an early member of the Black Student Psychological Association, an affiliate of the American Psychological Association (APA). He was part of a group that disrupted the APA presidential address of George Armitage Miller in order to bring attention to the needs of black psychology students. When he finished his Ph.D., he became the 1972–1973 president of the Association of Black Psychologists. Jackson has become known for his studies of race relations and disparities in minority health. He led the National Survey of American Life: Coping with Stress in the 21st Century (NSAL).

Jackson was a Distinguished Professor of Psychology at the University of Michigan. He was named to the National Science Board in 2014. He was elected to the Electorate Nominating Committee of the American Association for the Advancement of Science (AAAS) in 2015. The same year, Jackson finished his second five-year term as director of the University of Michigan Institute for Social Research; he was succeeded by economist David Lam. A member of the Institute of Medicine, Jackson has served on several National Research Council committees.

=== Honors ===
Jackson was named a Fellow of the AAAS in 2005. He received the 2006 James McKeen Cattell Fellow Award from the Association for Psychological Science and delivered the keynote address at the organization's annual convention in 2012. He was recognized with a 2009 Investigator Award from the Robert Wood Johnson Foundation. He became president of the Society for the Psychological Study of Social Issues in 2010–2011.

=== Death ===
Jackson died on the evening of September 1, 2020, due to pancreatic cancer.
