= Surface second harmonic generation =

Surface second harmonic generation is a method for probing interfaces in atomic and molecular systems. In second harmonic generation (SHG), the light frequency is doubled, essentially converting two photons of the original beam of energy E into a single photon of energy 2E as it interacts with noncentrosymmetric media. Surface second harmonic generation is a special case of SHG where the second beam is generated because of a break of symmetry caused by an interface. Since centrosymmetric symmetry in centrosymmetric media is only disrupted in the first (occasionally second and third) atomic or molecular layer of a system, properties of the second harmonic signal then provide information about the surface atomic or molecular layers only. Surface SHG is possible even for materials which do not exhibit SHG in the bulk. Although in many situations the dominant second harmonic signal arises from the broken symmetry at the surface, the signal in fact always has contributions from both the surface and bulk. Thus, the most sensitive experiments typically involve modification of a surface and study of the subsequent modification of the harmonic generation properties.

== History ==
Second harmonic generation from a surface was first observed by Terhune, Maker, and Savage at the Ford Motor Company in 1962, one year after Franken et al. first discovered second harmonic generation in bulk crystals. Prior to Terhune's discovery, it was believed that crystals could only exhibit second harmonic generation if the crystal was noncentrosymmetric. Terhune observed that calcite, a centrosymmetric crystal which is only capable of SHG in the bulk in the presence of an applied electric field which would break the symmetry of the electronic structure, surprisingly also produced a second harmonic signal in the absence of an external electric field. During the 1960s, SHG was observed for many other centrosymmetric media including metals, semiconductors, oxides, and liquids. In 1968, Bloembergen et al. showed that the second harmonic signal was generated from the surface. Interest in this field waned during the 1970s and only a handful of research groups investigated surface SHG, most notably Y. R. Shen's group at University of California at Berkeley. During the 70s and 80s, most of the research in this field focused on understanding the electronic response, particularly in metals. In 1981, Chen et al. showed that SHG could be used to detect individual monolayers, and since then, much research has gone into using and understanding SHG as surface probe of molecular adsorption and orientation.

SHG was later extended to vibrational sum frequency generation spectroscopy (VSFG) and further extended to heterodyne-detected VSFG (HD-VSFG).

== Excitation of second harmonic signal ==
Just as bulk second harmonic generation, surface SHG arises out of the second-order susceptibility tensor χ^{(2)}. While the χ^{(2)} tensor contains 27 elements, many of these elements are reduced by symmetry arguments. The exact nature of these arguments depends on the application. When determining molecular orientation, it is assumed that χ^{(2)} is rotationally invariant around the z-axis (normal to the surface). The number of tensor elements reduces from 27 to the following 7 independent quantities: χ_{ZZZ}, χ_{ZXX} = χ_{ZYY}, χ_{XZX} = χ_{YZY}, χ_{XXZ} = χ_{YYZ}, χ_{XYZ} = −χ_{YXZ}, χ_{XZY} = −χ_{YZX}, χ_{ZXY} = −χ_{ZYX}. Second Harmonic Generation further restricts the independent terms by requiring the tensor is symmetric in the last two indices reducing the number of independent tensor terms to 4: χ_{ZZZ}, χ_{ZXX} (equivalently χ_{ZYY}), χ_{XXZ} (equivalently χ_{XZX}, χ_{YZY}, χ_{YYZ}), χ_{XYZ} (equivalently χ_{XZY}, −χ_{YXZ}, −χ_{YZX}). In order for χ_{ZXY} = −χ_{ZYX} to hold under this final condition, both terms must be 0. The four independent terms are material dependent properties and can vary as the external conditions change. These four terms give rise to the second harmonic signal, and allow for calculation of material properties such as electronic structure, atomic organization, and molecular orientation. Detailed analysis of the second harmonic generation from surfaces and interfaces, as well as the ability to detect monolayers and sub-monolayers, may be found in Guyot-Sionnest et al.

== Applications ==
=== Interface structure ===
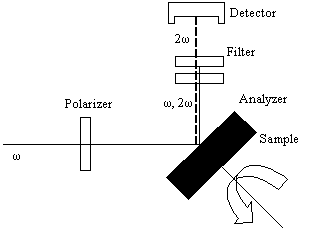
Figure 1: Crystal surface SHG setup

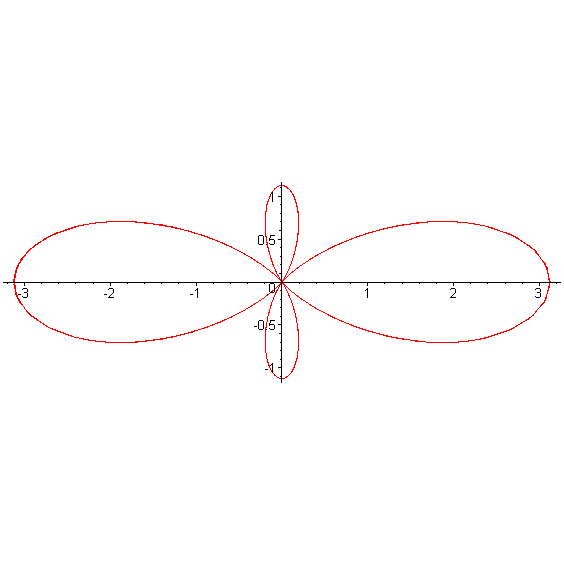
Figure 2: Polar crystal surface SHG response (arbitrary units) (adapted from)

It may seem paradoxical at first that surface SHG which relies on a break in symmetry is possible in crystals which have an inherent symmetric structure. At a crystalline interface half of the atomic forces experienced in the bulk crystal are not present which causes changes in the atomic and electronic structures. There are two major changes that occur at the interface: 1) the interplanar distances of the top layers change and 2) the atoms redistribute themselves to a completely new packing structure. While symmetry is maintained in the surface planes, the break in symmetry out-of-plane modifies the second-order susceptibility tensor χ^{(2)}, giving rise to optical second harmonic generation. Typical measurements of SHG from crystalline surfaces structures are performed by rotating the sample in an incident beam (Figure 1). The second harmonic signal will vary with the azimuth angle of the sample due to the symmetry of the atomic and electronic structure (Figure 2). As a result, surface SHG theory is highly dependent on geometry of the superstructure. Since electron interactions are responsible for the SHG response, the jellium model is usually numerically solved using Density Functional Theory to predict the SHG response of a given surface. SHG sensitivity to surface structure approach was effectively demonstrated by Heinz, Loy, and Thompson, working for IBM in 1985. They showed that the SHG signal from a freshly cleaved Si(111) surface would alter its behavior as the temperature was raised and the superstructure changed from a 2×1 structure to the 7×7 structure. Noting the change in signal, they were able to verify the existence of one mirror plane in the 2×1 construction and 3 mirror planes in the 7×7 construction thereby providing new information to the bonding structure of the surface atoms. Since then, surface SHG has been used to probe many other metallic surfaces such as reconstructed gold (110), Pd(111), and Al(100).

Perhaps one of the most powerful uses of surface SHG is the probing of surface structure of buried interfaces. Traditional surface tools such as atomic force microscopy and scanning tunneling microscopy as well as many forms of electron diffraction must be conducted under vacuum, and are not sensitive to interfaces deeper in the probed medium. SHG measurements allow the incident laser beam to pass without interaction through higher level materials to the target interface where the second harmonic signal is generated. In cases where the transmitting materials do interact with the beam, these contributions to the second harmonic signal can be resolved in other experiments and subtracted out. The resulting measured second harmonic signal contains the second harmonic component from the buried interface alone. This type of measurement is useful for determining the surface structure of the interface. As an example, Cheikh-Rouhou et al. demonstrated this process to resolve interface structures of 5 layer systems.

=== Adsorption measurements ===
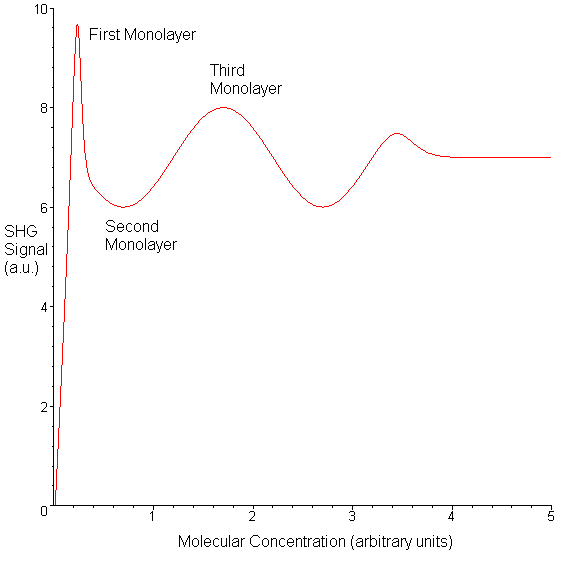
Figure 3: Surface SHG Adsorption Isotherm for Rhodamine 6G (adapted from

Surface SHG is useful for monitoring the growth of monolayers on a surface. As particles adsorb, the SHG signal is altered. Two common applications in surface science are the adsorption of small gas molecules onto a surface and the adsorption of dissolved dye molecules in a liquid to a surface. Bourguignon et al. showed that as carbon monoxide is adsorbed onto a Pd(111) surface, the SHG signal decreased exponentially as predicted by the Langmuir isotherm. As CO coverage approached 1 monolayer, the SHG intensity leveled off. Larger molecules like dyes often can form multilayers on a surface, and this can be measured in situ using SHG. As the first monolayer forms, the intensity can often be seen to increase to a maximum until a uniform distribution of particles is obtained (Figure 3). As additional particles adsorb and the second monolayer begins to form, the SHG signal decreases until it reaches a minimum at the completion of the second monolayer. This alternating behavior can typically be seen for the growth of monolayers. As additional layers form, the SHG response of the substrate is screened by the adsorbate and eventually, the SHG signal levels off.

=== Molecular orientation ===
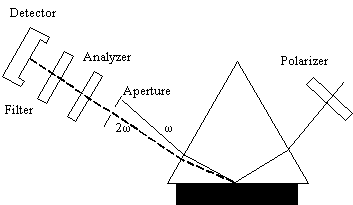
Figure 4: Total internal reflection geometry of surface SHG

As molecular layers adsorb to surfaces it is often useful to know the molecular orientation of the adsorbed molecules. Molecular orientation can be probed by observing the polarization of the second harmonic signal, generated from a polarized beam. Figure 4 shows a typical experimental geometry for molecular orientation experiments. The beam is incident on the sample in a total internal reflection geometry which improves the second harmonic signal because as the wave propagates along the interface, additional second harmonic photons are generated, By rotating either the polarizer or the analyzer, the s- and p-polarized signals are measured which allow for the calculation of the second-order susceptibility tensor χ^{(2)}. Simpson's research group has studied this phenomenon in depth. The molecular orientation can differ from the laboratory axis in three directions, corresponding to three angles. Typically, SHG measurements of this type are only able to extract a single parameter, namely the molecular orientation with respect to the surface normal.

==== Calculation of molecular orientation ====
When dealing with adsorbed molecules on a surface, it is typical to find a uniaxial distribution of the molecules, resulting in x- and y- coordinate terms to be interchangeable. When analyzing the second-order susceptibility tensor χ^{(2)}, the quantities χ_{XYZ} = -χ_{YXZ} must be 0 and only three independent tensor terms remain: χ_{zzz}, χ_{zxx}, and χ_{xxz}. The intensities of the s and p polarizations in the second harmonic are given by following relationships:

$$\mathrm I_s^{2 \omega}(\gamma)=C |s_1 \sin {2 \gamma}\ \chi_{xxz}|^2(I^{\omega})^2$$
$$\mathrm I_p^{2 \omega}(\gamma)=C |s_5\chi_{zxx}+\cos^2{ \gamma}\ {(s_2\chi_{xxz} +s_3\chi_{zxx}+s_4\chi_{zzz}-s_5\chi{zxx})}|^2(I^{\omega})^2$$

where γ is the polarization angle with γ = 0 corresponding to p-polarized light. The s_{i} terms depend on the experimental geometry are functions of the total internal reflection angles of the incident and second harmonic beams and the linear and nonlinear Fresnel factors respectively which relate the electric field components at the interface to incident and detected fields.

The second-order susceptibility tensor, χ^{(2)}, is the parameter which can be measured in second order experiments, but it does not explicitly provide insight to the molecular orientation of surface molecules. To determine molecular orientation, the second-order hyperpolarizability tensor β, must be calculated. For adsorbed molecules in a uniaxial distribution, the only independent hyperpolarizability tensor terms are β_{z’z’z’}, β_{z’x’x’}, and β_{x’x’z’} where ’ terms denote the molecular coordinate system as opposed to the laboratory coordinate system. β can be related to χ^{(2)} through orientational averages. As an example, in an isotropic distribution on the surface, χ^{(2)} elements are given by.

$$\chi_{ZZZ}=N_s[\langle\cos^3 \theta\rangle\beta_{Z'Z'Z'} + \langle\cos \theta \sin^2 \theta \sin^2 \Psi\rangle(\beta_{Z'X'X'} + \beta_{X'X'Z'})]$$

$$\chi_{ZXX}=\frac {1}{2}N_s[\langle\cos \theta \sin^2 \theta\rangle\beta_{Z'Z'X'}+\langle\cos \theta\rangle\beta_{Z'X'X'} - \langle\cos \theta \sin^2 \theta \sin^2 \Psi\rangle(\beta_{Z'X'X'} + \beta_{X'X'Z'})]$$

$$\chi_{XXZ}=\frac {1}{2}N_s[\langle\cos \theta \sin^2 \theta\rangle \beta_{Z'Z'X'} + \langle\cos \theta\rangle\beta_{X'X'Z'} - \langle\cos \theta \sin^2 \theta \sin^2 \Psi\rangle(\beta_{Z'X'X'} + \beta_{X'X'Z'})]$$

where N_{s} is the surface number density of the adsorbed molecules, θ and Ψ are orientational angles relating the molecular coordinate system to the laboratory coordinate system, and <x> represents the average value of x. In many cases, only one or two of the molecular hyperpolarizability tensor are dominant. In these cases, the relationships between χ and β can be simplified. Bernhard Dick presents several of these simplifications.

=== Additional applications ===
In addition to these applications, surface SHG is used to probe other effects. In surface spectroscopy, where either the fundamental or second harmonic are resonant with electronic transitions in the surface atoms, details can be determined about the electronic structure and band gaps. In monolayer microscopy the second harmonic signal is magnified and surface features are imaged with a resolution on the order of a wavelength. Surface SHG can also be used to monitor chemical reactions at a surface with picosecond resolution.
