= Alison R. H. Narayan =

American chemist (born 1984)

Alison R.H. Narayan
- Born: 1984 (age 41–42)
- Education: University of Michigan B.S. (2006); University of California, Berkeley Ph.D. (2011)
- Scientific career
- Fields: Biocatalysis, Organic chemistry
- Workplaces: University of Michigan - Life Sciences Institute
- Thesis: New Reactions and Synthetic Strategies toward Indolizidine Alkaloids and Pallavicinia Diterpenes (2011)
- Doctoral advisor: Richmond Sarpong
- Other academic advisors: David H. Sherman

Alison Rae Hardin Narayan (born 1984) is an American chemist and the William R. Roush assistant professor in the Department of Chemistry at the University of Michigan College of Literature, Science, and the Arts. Additionally, she is a research assistant professor at University of Michigan Life Sciences Institute.

== Early life and education ==
Narayan grew up in Cheboygan, Michigan graduating from high school in Frankenmuth. She completed her B.S. in chemistry at the University of Michigan in 2006. During her bachelor's degree, she carried out research under the supervision of John P. Wolfe on palladium-catalyzed methodology for the synthesis of substituted tetrahydrofuran rings. Narayan completed her Ph.D. in organic chemistry in 2011 with Richmond Sarpong at the University of California, Berkeley, with a thesis entitled "New Reactions and Synthetic Strategies toward Indolizidine Alkaloids and Pallavicinia Diterpenes". In 2011, Narayan returned to the University of Michigan as a postdoctoral fellow in David Sherman's lab. During her postdoc, she engineered cytochrome P450 enzymes to perform C-H functionalization in non-native substrates. In 2015, Narayan joined the Department of Chemistry and the Life Sciences Institute at the University of Michigan as an assistant professor.

== Research ==
The Narayan lab focuses on identifying and characterizing enzymes from various microorganisms that can catalyze chemical reactions that are challenging to reproduce synthetically. These biocatalysts can be employed to create various chemicals for pharmaceutical or other purposes.

== Awards and honors ==
Narayan has received numerous awards and honors including:

- American Chemical Society C&EN, Talented 12 (2016)
- Thieme Chemistry Journals Award (2019)
- Cottrell Scholars (2019)
- Sloan Research Fellow (2019)
- Camille Dreyfus Teacher-Scholar Award (2020)

== Key publications ==
- Baker Dockrey, S. A. and Narayan, A. R. H. “Flavin-dependent biocatalysts in synthesis” Tetrahedron 2019 doi:10.1016/j.tet.2019.01.008 (Special Issue on Biocatalysis in Organic Synthesis).
- Lukowski, A. L.. and Narayan, A. R. H. “Natural voltage-gated sodium channel ligands: Biosynthesis and biology” ChemBioChem 2019 doi:10.1002/cbic.201800754 (Special Issue: New Talent).
- Benítez, Attabey Rodríguez; Tweedy, Sara; Dockrey, Summer A. Baker; Lukowski, April L.; Wymore, Troy; Khare, Dheeraj; Brooks L. Charles III; Smith Janet L.; Narayan Alison R.H. (2018): Structural Basis for Selectivity in Flavin-Dependent Monooxygenase-Catalyzed Oxidative Dearomatization. ChemRxiv. Preprint. doi:10.26434/chemrxiv.7297766.v1
- Baker Dockrey, S. A.; Doyon, T. J.; Perkins, J. C.; Narayan, A. R. H. “Whole-cell biocatalysis platform for gram-scale oxidative dearomatization of phenols”Chem. Biol. Drug Des. 2018 doi:10.1111/cbdd.13443
- Lukowski, A. L.; Ellinwood, D. C.; Hinze, M. E.; DeLuca, R. J.; Du Bois, J.; Hall, S.; Narayan, A. R. H. "C–H hydroxylation in paralytic shellfish toxin biosynthesis" J. Am. Chem. Soc., 2018, 140 (37), 11863–11869 doi:10.1021/jacs.8b08901
- Chun, S. W.; Hinze, M. E.; Skiba, M. A.; Narayan, A. R. H. "Chemistry of a unique polyketide-like synthase" J. Am. Chem. Soc. 2018, 140, 2430–2433. doi:10.1021/jacs.7b13297
- Baker Dockrey, S. A.; Lukowski, A. L.; Becker, M. R.; Narayan, A. R. H. “Biocatalytic site- and enantioselective oxidative dearomatization of phenols” Nature Chem. 2018, 10, 119–125. doi:10.1038/nchem.2879

Mentored Key Publications

- “Enzymatic Hydroxylation of an Unactivated Methylene C–H Bond Guided by Molecular Dynamics Simulations” (Nat. Chem. 2015, DOI: 10.1038/nchem.2285)
- “Directing Group-Controlled Regioselectivity in an Enzymatic C–H Bond Oxygenation” (J. Am. Chem. Soc. 2014, DOI: 10.1021/ja5016052)
- “Indolizinones as Synthetic Scaffolds: Fundamental Reactivity and the Relay of Stereochemical Information” (Org. Biomol. Chem. 2012, DOI: 10.1039/clob06423a)
