= Molecular engineering =

Field of study in molecular properties

Molecular engineering is an emerging field of study concerned with the design and testing of molecular properties, behavior and interactions in order to assemble better materials, systems, and processes for specific functions. This approach, in which observable properties of a macroscopic system are influenced by direct alteration of a molecular structure, falls into the broader category of “bottom-up” design. This field is utmost relevant to Cheminformatics, when related to the research in the Computational Sciences.

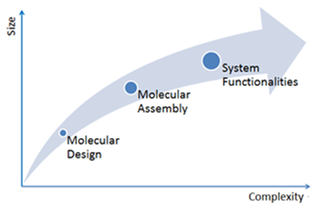
Molecular engineering deals with material development efforts in emerging technologies that require rigorous rational molecular design approaches towards systems of high complexity.

Molecular engineering is highly interdisciplinary by nature, encompassing aspects of chemical engineering, materials science, bioengineering, electrical engineering, physics, mechanical engineering, and chemistry. There is also considerable overlap with nanotechnology, in that both are concerned with the behavior of materials on the scale of nanometers or smaller. Given the highly fundamental nature of molecular interactions, there are a plethora of potential application areas, limited perhaps only by one's imagination and the laws of physics. However, some of the early successes of molecular engineering have come in the fields of immunotherapy, synthetic biology, and printable electronics (see molecular engineering applications).

Molecular engineering is a dynamic and evolving field with complex target problems; breakthroughs require sophisticated and creative engineers who are conversant across disciplines. A rational engineering methodology that is based on molecular principles is in contrast to the widespread trial-and-error approaches common throughout engineering disciplines. Rather than relying on well-described but poorly-understood empirical correlations between the makeup of a system and its properties, a molecular design approach seeks to manipulate system properties directly using an understanding of their chemical and physical origins. This often gives rise to fundamentally new materials and systems, which are required to address outstanding needs in numerous fields, from energy to healthcare to electronics. Additionally, with the increased sophistication of technology, trial-and-error approaches are often costly and difficult, as it may be difficult to account for all relevant dependencies among variables in a complex system. Molecular engineering efforts may include computational tools, experimental methods, or a combination of both.

== History ==
Molecular engineering was first mentioned in the research literature in 1956 by Arthur R. von Hippel, who defined it as "… a new mode of thinking about engineering problems. Instead of taking prefabricated materials and trying to devise engineering applications consistent with their macroscopic properties, one builds materials from their atoms and molecules for the purpose at hand." This concept was echoed in Richard Feynman's seminal 1959 lecture There's Plenty of Room at the Bottom, which is widely regarded as giving birth to some of the fundamental ideas of the field of nanotechnology. In spite of the early introduction of these concepts, it was not until the mid-1980s with the publication of Engines of Creation: The Coming Era of Nanotechnology by Drexler that the modern concepts of nano and molecular-scale science began to grow in the public consciousness.

The discovery of electrically conductive properties in polyacetylene by Alan J. Heeger in 1977 effectively opened the field of organic electronics, which has proved foundational for many molecular engineering efforts. Design and optimization of these materials has led to a number of innovations including organic light-emitting diodes and flexible solar cells.

== Applications ==
Molecular design has been an important element of many disciplines in academia, including bioengineering, chemical engineering, electrical engineering, materials science, mechanical engineering and chemistry. However, one of the ongoing challenges is in bringing together the critical mass of manpower amongst disciplines to span the realm from design theory to materials production, and from device design to product development. Thus, while the concept of rational engineering of technology from the bottom-up is not new, it is still far from being widely translated into R&D efforts.

Molecular engineering is used in many industries. Some applications of technologies where molecular engineering plays a critical role:

=== Consumer Products ===
- Antibiotic surfaces (e.g. incorporation of silver nanoparticles or antibacterial peptides into coatings to prevent microbial infection)
- Cosmetics (e.g. rheological modification with small molecules and surfactants in shampoo)
- Cleaning products (e.g. nanosilver in laundry detergent)
- Consumer electronics (e.g. organic light-emitting diode displays (OLED))
- Electrochromic windows (e.g. windows in the Boeing 787 Dreamliner)
- Zero emission vehicles (e.g. advanced fuel cells/batteries)
- Self-cleaning surfaces (e.g. super hydrophobic surface coatings)

=== Energy Harvesting and Storage ===
- Flow batteries – synthesizing molecules for high-energy density electrolytes and highly-selective membranes in grid-scale energy storage systems
- Lithium-ion batteries – creating new molecules for use as electrode binders, electrolytes, electrolyte additives, or even for energy storage directly in order to improve energy density (using materials such as graphene, silicon nanorods, and lithium metal), power density, cycle life, and safety
- Solar cells – developing new materials for more efficient and cost-effective solar cells including organic, quantum dot or perovskite-based photovoltaics
- Photocatalytic water splitting – enhancing the production of hydrogen fuel using solar energy and advanced catalytic materials such as semiconductor nanoparticles

=== Environmental Engineering ===
- Water desalination (e.g. new membranes for highly-efficient low-cost ion removal)
- Soil remediation (e.g. catalytic nanoparticles that accelerate the degradation of long-lived soil contaminants such as chlorinated organic compounds)
- Carbon sequestration (e.g. new materials for CO_{2} adsorption)

=== Immunotherapy ===
- Peptide-based vaccines (e.g. amphiphilic peptide macromolecular assemblies induce a robust immune response)
- Peptide-containing biopharmaceuticals (e.g. nanoparticles, liposomes, polyelectrolyte micelles as delivery vehicles)

=== Synthetic Biology ===
- CRISPR – faster and more efficient gene editing technique
- Gene delivery/gene therapy – designing molecules to deliver modified or new genes into cells of live organisms to cure genetic disorders
- Metabolic engineering – modifying metabolism of organisms to optimize production of chemicals (e.g. synthetic genomics)
- Protein engineering – altering structure of existing proteins to enable specific new functions, or the creation of fully artificial proteins
- DNA-functionalized materials – 3D assemblies of DNA-conjugated nanoparticle lattices

== Techniques and instruments used ==
Molecular engineers utilize sophisticated tools and instruments to make and analyze the interactions of molecules and the surfaces of materials at the molecular and nano-scale. The growing complexity of surface-bound molecular systems has driven the development of increasingly refined surface analysis methods. In parallel, advances in high-performance computing have enabled wider use of computational modeling and simulation in the investigation of molecular-scale systems.

=== Computational and Theoretical Approaches ===
- Computational chemistry
- High performance computing
- Molecular dynamics
- Molecular modeling
- Statistical mechanics
- Theoretical chemistry
- Topology

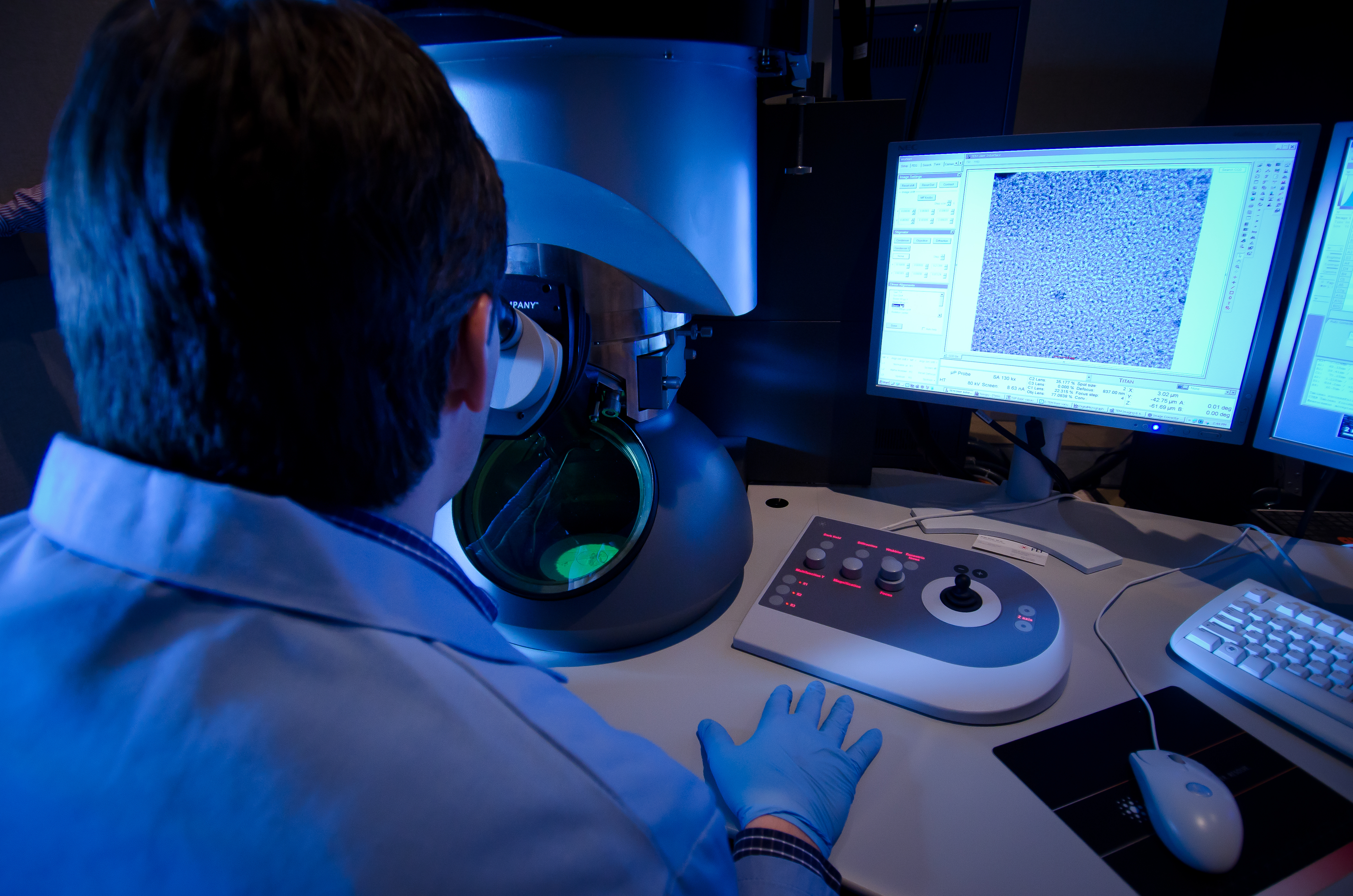
An EMSL scientist using the environmental transmission electron microscope at Pacific Northwest National Laboratory. The ETEM provides in situ capabilities that enable atomic-resolution imaging and spectroscopic studies of materials under dynamic operating conditions. In contrast to traditional operation of TEM under high vacuum, EMSL's ETEM uniquely allows imaging within high-temperature and gas environments.

=== Microscopy ===
- Atomic Force Microscopy (AFM)
- Scanning Electron Microscopy (SEM)
- Transmission Electron Microscopy (TEM)

=== Molecular Characterization ===
- Dynamic light scattering (DLS)
- Matrix-assisted laser desorption/ionization (MALDI) spectrocosopy
- Nuclear magnetic resonance (NMR) spectroscopy
- Size exclusion chromatography (SEC)

=== Spectroscopy ===
- Ellipsometry
- 2D X-Ray Diffraction (XRD)
- Raman Spectroscopy/Microscopy

=== Surface Science ===
- Glow Discharge Optical Emission Spectrometry
- Time of Flight-Secondary Ion Mass Spectrometry (ToF-SIMS)
- X-Ray Photoelectron Spectroscopy (XPS)

=== Synthetic Methods ===
- DNA synthesis
- Nanoparticle synthesis
- Organic synthesis
- Peptide synthesis
- Polymer synthesis

=== Other Tools ===
- Focused Ion Beam (FIB)
- Profilometer
- UV Photoelectron Spectroscopy (UPS)
- Vibrational Sum Frequency Generation

== Research / Education ==
At least three universities offer graduate degrees dedicated to molecular engineering: the University of Chicago, the University of Washington, and Kyoto University. These programs are interdisciplinary institutes with faculty from several research areas.

The academic journal Molecular Systems Design & Engineering publishes research from a wide variety of subject areas that demonstrates "a molecular design or optimisation strategy targeting specific systems functionality and performance."

== See also ==
=== General topics ===
- Biological engineering
- Biomolecular engineering
- Chemical engineering
- Chemistry
- Electrical engineering
- Materials science and engineering
- Mechanical engineering
- Molecular design software
- Molecular electronics
- Molecular modeling
- Molecular nanotechnology
- Nanotechnology
