= Daniel J. Klionsky =

American biochemist and molecular biologist

- Born: 1958 (age 67–68); California, USA

Academic background
- Education: Stanford (Ph.D.); UCLA (B.Sc.)
- Thesis: Assembly of the Proton-translocating ATPase of Escherichia Coli

Academic work
- Institutions: Michigan (2000–); UC Davis (1990–2000)
- Main interests: autophagy

Daniel Jay Klionsky (born 1958) is an American biochemist and molecular biologist. He is the Alexander G. Ruthven Professor of Life Sciences and professor of molecular, cellular, and developmental biology at the University of Michigan. As a cell biologist, Klionsky pioneered the understanding of autophagy, the process by which cells break down to survive stress conditions such as starvation, and the role autophagy plays in cancer, neurodegenerative diseases, and other areas of human health.

== Early life and education ==
Klionsky was born in 1958 in California. Although he enjoyed biology in high school, Klionsky enrolled at the University of California, Los Angeles while majoring in history. He eventually switched to biology and enrolled at Stanford University for his PhD. Upon completing his PhD, Klionsky accepted a Helen Hay Whitney postdoctoral fellowship at the California Institute of Technology.

== Career ==
=== UC Davis ===
In 1990, Klionsky was appointed an assistant professor of Microbiology at the University of California, Davis. He was eventually promoted to the rank of associate professor where he led a research team to create a "superyeast" that grew twice as fast as normal yeast after being frozen, dehydrated, or during brewing. In 1997, he was named a full professor and accepted a Guggenheim Fellowship in the field of Molecular and Cellular Biology.

=== Michigan ===
Klionsky left UC Davis to accept a similar dual position at the University of Michigan's Department of Molecular, Cellular, and Developmental Biology and in the Department of Biochemistry in the Medical School in 2000. During the beginning of his tenure at Michigan, he received a 2003 Director's Award for Distinguished Teaching Scholars for his "aims to reform the introductory biology curriculum at the university by adapting techniques used by smaller colleges, including strategies that implement group learning exercises in lecture settings." Klionsky also moved to the Life Sciences Institute Department, where he was named the Alexander G. Ruthven Professor of Life Sciences in 2006.

During his tenure at Michigan, Klionsky became "renowned for his pioneering contributions to the understanding of autophagy, the process by which cells break down to survive stress conditions such as starvation, and the role autophagy plays in cancer, neurodegenerative diseases and other areas of human health." As a result, Klionsky was singled out by Thomson Reuters as a future Nobel Laureate. He was later awarded the 2015 van Deenan Medal from the Institute of Biomembranes at Utrecht University in the Netherlands for being "a leading scientist in biomembrane research." Following this, he was recognized with a University of Michigan Distinguished Faculty Achievement Award and was elected to the American Academy of Arts and Sciences. In 2019, Klionsky was the recipient of an honorary degree from the University of Bordeaux.

During the COVID-19 pandemic, Klionsky wrote Highlights in the fight against COVID-19: does autophagy play a role in SARS-CoV-2 infection? with Elizabeth Delorme-Axford. He also proposed that autophagy could be a link between SARS-CoV-2 and cancer.
