= John E. Lisman =

American neuroscientist 1944-2017

- Born: 1944
- Died: October 20, 2017 (aged 72–73)
- Education: Brandeis University (BA) Massachusetts Institute of Technology (PhD)
- Known for: Memory research
- Scientific career
- Fields: Neuroscience
- Workplaces: Harvard University; Brandeis University
- Thesis: An electrophysiological investigation of the ventral eye of the horseshoe crab Limulus polyphemus (1971)
- Doctoral advisor: Joel E. Brown
- Website: https://www.brandeis.edu/volen/faculty/lisman/index.html

John E. Lisman (1944 – October 20, 2017) was the Zalman Abraham Kekst Chair in Neuroscience at the Brandeis University in Waltham, Massachusetts. He was Professor of Biology, noted for his research on amplification and switching in signal transduction, memory, and neurological diseases such as schizophrenia and Alzheimer's disease. For his research, he was elected a Fellow of the American Association for the Advancement of Science in 2013.

== Education ==
Lisman graduated cum laude with a bachelor's degree in physics in 1966. He completed graduate work at the Massachusetts Institute of Technology and a postdoctoral fellowship with Nobel laureate George Wald at Harvard University.

== John E. Lisman Memorial Lecture in Vision Science ==
The John E. Lisman '66 Memorial Lecture in Vision Science is an annual award and lecture given by a leading international scholar in vision research who is selected by a committee at Brandeis University. Scholars are selected based on their extraordinary contributions to vision research and receive a $5000 prize. The scholar visits Brandeis for 1–2 days to meet faculty, students, and postdoctoral fellows, and often participates in teaching an ongoing Brandeis course.

The Lisman award is endowed by a gift from the Lifelong Vision Foundation (previously: Midwest Cornea Research Foundation), a public charity established to promote and disseminate vision research that is aimed at preserving and restoring sight. The award was initially established by Brandeis alumni Jay Pepose (BS 1975) and Susan Feigenbaum (BS 1974), and, prior to 2018, was named the Jay Pepose ’75 Award in Vision Sciences. In 2018, the award was renamed to honor the memory of John E. Lisman (1944-2017), a Brandeis alumnus (BS 1966) and faculty member from 1974 until his death in 2017.

Date of Lecture	Awardee	Affiliation	Title or Topic of Lecture
February 8, 2010	Jay Neitz	University of Washington	Gene therapy for red-green color blindness in adult primates
February 9, 2010	Maureen Neitz	University of Washington	Retinal Activity Patterns and the Cause and Prevention of Nearsightedness
March 14, 2011	Peter Schiller	Massachusetts Institute of Technology	Parallel Information Processing Channels Created in the Retina
March 12, 2012	Michael Stryker	University of California, San Francisco	Rewiring the Brain: Mechanisms of Competition and Recovery of Function in the Mammalian Cortex
March 13, 2013	Gordon Fain	University of California, Los Angeles	The G-protein Cascade of Photoreceptors
March 12, 2014	Richard Masland	Harvard Medical School	The neuronal organization of the retina: answers and problems
May 18, 2015	William Newsome	Stanford University School of Medicine	A New Look at Gating: Selective Integration of Sensory Signals through Network Dynamics
April 12, 2016	David Williams	University of Rochester	Seeing through the retina
March 13, 2017	Frank Werblin	University of California at Berkeley	The Evolution of Retinal Research
April 10, 2018	David Fitzpatrick	Max Planck Florida Institute	Functional synaptic architecture in primary visual cortex
April 9, 2019	Constance Cepko	Harvard Medical School	The Development of the Vertebrate Retina and Nanobodies as Regulators of Intracellular Activities
November 15, 2021	Doris Tsao	California Institute of Technology	The macaque face patch system: a neural rosetta stone (2020 winner, lecture postponed due to COVID-19)
April 11, 2022	John E. Dowling	Harvard Medical School	Twists and Turns: Vitamin A, Vision and Memory (2021 winner, lecture postponed due to COVID-19)
May 2, 2022	R. Clay Reid	Allen Institute	Large-Scale Microscopy for Brain Mapping: Electron and Light Microscopic Approaches to Connectomics
April 17, 2023	Rachel O. Wong	University of Washington	Wiring specificity and plasticity of the vertebrate retina
April 1, 2024	Jonathan C. Horton	UCSF	Ocular dominance columns and strabismus
March 3, 2025	Christine A. Curcio	University of Alabama, Birmingham	How laboratory microscopy became clinical imaging of the human retina
March 17, 2026	Marla B. Feller	University of California, Berkeley	Riding Retinal Waves Through the Developing Visual System
October 27, 2026	J. Anthony Movshon	New York University	Using vision to understand the brain
