= Jay Neitz =

American ophthalmologist

- Born: 1953 (age 72–73)
- Education: San Jose State University (BA); University of California, Santa Barbara (PhD)
- Known for: Color vision research
- Spouse: Maureen Neitz
- Scientific career
- Fields: Ophthalmology
- Workplaces: University of Washington; Medical College of Wisconsin
- Thesis: Variations in Color Matching Among Humans with Normal Color Vision (1986)
- Doctoral advisor: Gerald Jacobs
- Website: neitzvision.com

Jay Neitz (born 1953) is an American professor of ophthalmology and a color vision researcher at the University of Washington in Seattle, Washington.

== Education and career ==
Neitz grew up in Montana. He attended San Jose State University for his undergraduate, finishing with a BA in psychology and physics in 1979. He went on to receive his PhD at the University of California, Santa Barbara in 1986 under the direction of Gerald Jacobs. His thesis title was Variations in Color Matching Among Humans with Normal Color Vision. After his PhD, he stayed at the same institution as a postdoctoral researcher for several years before starting a permanent position at the Medical College of Wisconsin. He moved to the University of Washington in 2009, where he is currently the Bishop Professor of Ophthalmology.

== Research ==
Neitz's research lab, which is run jointly with his spouse Maureen Neitz, works on the biology of vision disorders, particularly related to color-blindness.

Their work on treating color-blindness in monkeys received some attention in the popular science press. In this work, they gave gene therapy to two red-green color-blind squirrel monkeys, combined with training. After five months, the monkeys began to be able to distinguish red and green. There is some potential that a similar treatment may be eventually developed for humans. Neitz and coauthors have also proposed that gene therapies of this type might in the more distant future be able to give tetrachromatic vision to humans with normal vision.

In 2010, Neitz and his wife Maureen Neitz were awarded the Pepose Award in Vision Science by Brandeis University.
