= Anna K. Mapp =

American chemist

- Citizenship: American
- Education: Bryn Mawr college
- Spouse: Adam J. Matzger
- Children: 1
- Scientific career
- Fields: Chemistry
- Workplaces: University of Michigan
- Doctoral advisor: Clayton H. Heathcock
- Website: lsi.umich.edu

Anna Kathryn Mapp (born 1970) is an American chemist and the Edwin Vedejs collegiate professor of Chemistry. In 2013, Mapp joined the Michigan Life Sciences Institute as a research professor. Mapp served as the Director of the Program in Chemical Biology at the University of Michigan until 2019 when she accepted a position as the Associate Dean for Academic Programs and Initiatives at University of Michigan's Rackham Graduate School.

== Early life and education ==
Mapp completed her Bachelor of the Arts (B.A.) in chemistry at Bryn Mawr college. She continued her graduate studies at the University of California, Berkeley. She completed her Ph.D. under the supervision of Clayton H. Heathcock in 1997. In the 2000s she continued her postdoctoral studies at Caltech with Peter B. Dervan. She then started working at the Department of Chemistry in University of Michigan in 2000 where she is currently serving as a Professor of Chemistry.

On July 16, 2026, the Regents of the University of Michigan approved the appointment of Mapp as the Edwin Vedejs Distinguished University Professor of Chemistry, effective September 1, 2026.

== Research ==
Mapp's research group employs synthetic tools to study biological systems to understand how genes are regulated. The group identifies key protein-protein interactions vital for gene activation in yeast (S. cerevisiae). Their main goal is to develop drugs that can re-wire gene expression in diseased cells while leaving the rest intact. Much of her and her groups research focuses upon developing a molecular-level picture of inducible gene expression in eukaryotes using organic molecules as mechanistic probes.
