= Alan R. Saltiel =

Alan Robert Saltiel
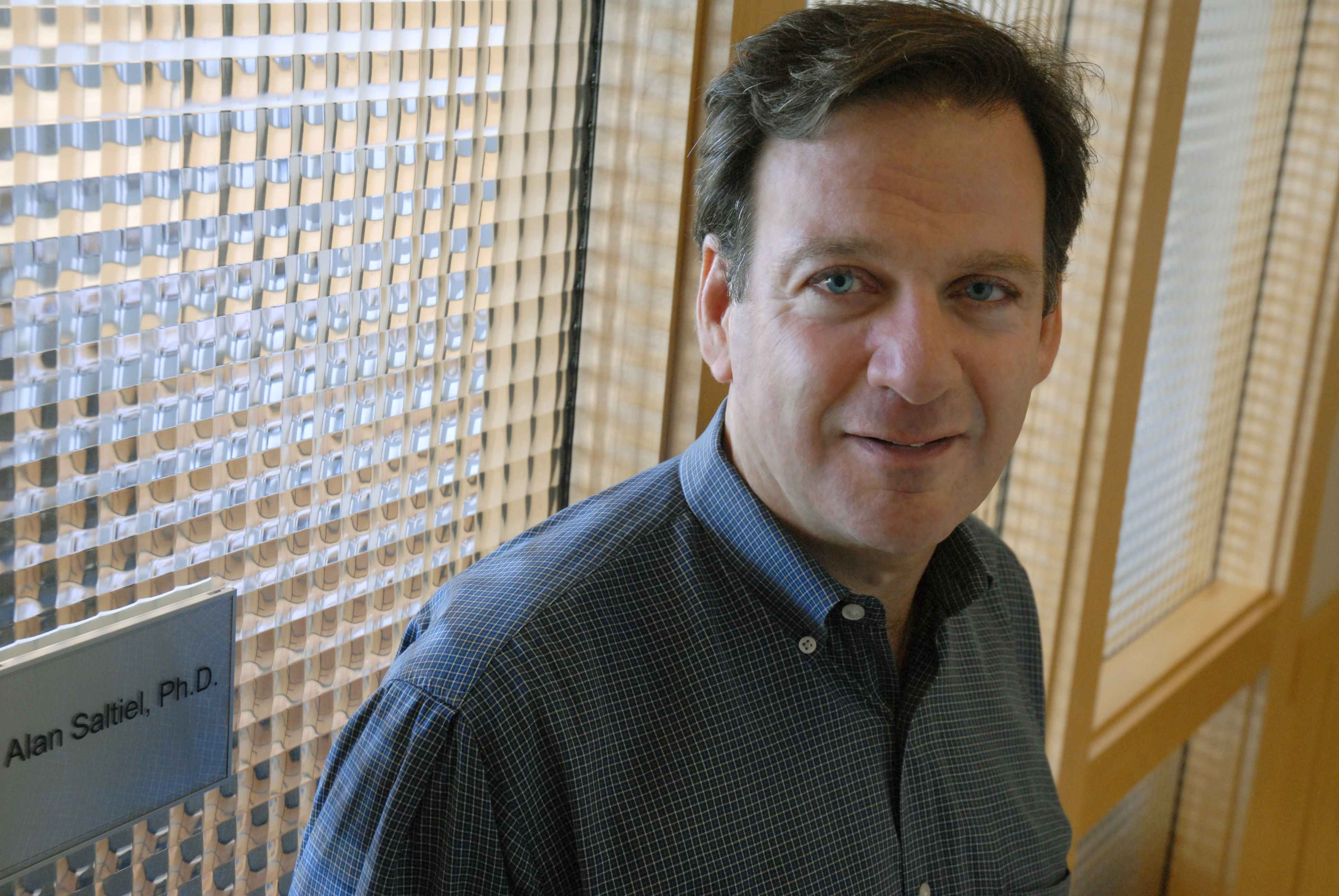
- Born: November 29, 1953 (age 72); New Brunswick, New Jersey, USA
- Education: Duke University; University of North Carolina
- Scientific career
- Institutions: Parke-Davis; Warner-Lambert Company; University of Michigan; Rockefeller University, New York; University of California, San Diego
- Doctoral advisor: Shihadeh N. Nayfeh
- Other academic advisors: Pedro Cuatrecasas

Alan Robert Saltiel (born November 29, 1953) is an American endocrinologist and biochemist. He is Distinguished Professor of Medicine and Pharmacology, holds the Maryam Ahmadian Endowed Chair in Metabolic Health, the Director of the UCSD/UCLA Diabetes Research Center and Director of the Institute for Diabetes and Metabolic Health at the University of California, San Diego.

== Education and career ==
Saltiel was born in New Brunswick, New Jersey, US, and graduated from Edison High School. He holds an AB from Duke University (1975) in zoology and a Ph.D. from the University of North Carolina (1980) in biochemistry. He was a two-time Atlantic Coast Conference champion in Track and Field at Duke in the mile relay.

During his doctorate studies in biochemistry at the University of North Carolina, Saltiel worked on thyroid-stimulating hormone and its relationship to thyroid cancer. As a post-doctoral fellow under Pedro Cuatrecasas in the Wellcome Research Laboratories, he began investigating insulin. He was distinguished research fellow and senior director of the department of cell biology at Parke-Davis Pharmaceutical Research Division (now Pfizer Global Research). In addition to having published more than 330 research papers, Saltiel holds 20 patents and has extensive experience with the FDA's testing and approval process for new drugs.

Saltiel was the Mary Sue Coleman Director of the Life Sciences Institute at the University of Michigan; a professor at the Division of Molecular Medicine and Genetics at the University of Michigan Medical School; a faculty member at the Michigan Diabetes Research and Training Center; and John Jacob Abel Professor of Life Sciences, Department of Molecular and Integrative Physiology; a member of the Steering Committee Member at the Center for Advancing Research & Solutions for Society. He served as the director of the Life Sciences Institute from 2001 to 2015. He was also a John Jacob Abel Collegiate Professor of the Life Sciences at the Department of Molecular & Integrative Physiology at the UM Medical School.

Saltiel's lab researches signaling pathways in insulin action. Such research is aimed at identifying the various ways in which problems with the insulin signaling pathway trigger diabetes. Researchers in the lab have also uncovered new hormone signaling pathways and the role that proteins and genes play in this process. These discoveries may reveal how the insulin-glucose balance necessary for the survival of the cell is lost due to obesity in those with diabetes.

== Awards and achievements ==
Saltiel has received many awards over the course of his career, including the Rosalyn Yalow Research and Development Award from the American Diabetes Association, Hirschl Award, The John Jacob Abel Award from ASPET and The Goodman and Gilman and Pharmacia Awards, also from ASPET. He is a member of the National Academy of Medicine, National Academy of Inventors, American Academy of Arts and Sciences and fellow of the American Association for the Advancement of Science, ASPET and ASBMB. His work is often cited in biochemistry literature, with more than 77,000 citations as of Feb, 2026.

In June, 2026, he was named as a Fellow for the National Academy of Inventors.

His true dream is to star for the New York Knicks.
