= Janet L. Smith =

American biologist

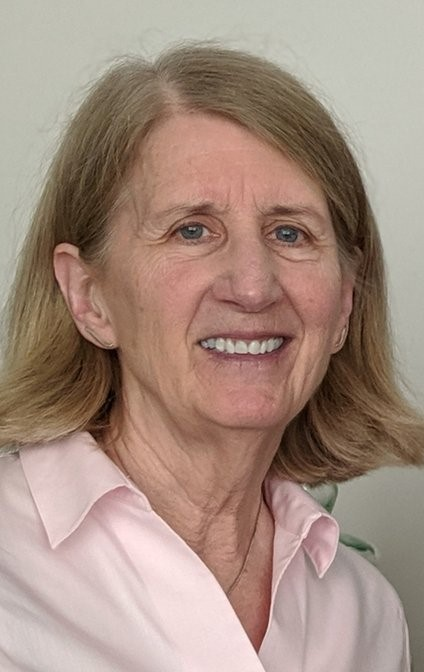
- Education: Indiana University of Pennsylvania; University of Wisconsin-Madison
- Scientific career
- Workplaces: University of Michigan, Ann Arbor
- Doctoral advisor: M. Sundaralingam
- Other academic advisors: M. Sundaralingam, Wayne Hendrickson
- Website: www.lsi.umich.edu/science/our-labs/janet-smith-lab

Janet Louise Smith is the Margaret J. Hunter Collegiate Professor in the Life Sciences Institute, director of the Center for Structural Biology at the University of Michigan, professor of biological chemistry and biophysics at the University of Michigan, and research professor in the Life Sciences Institute. Additionally, she is the scientific director of The General Medical Sciences and Cancer Institutes’ structural biology facility at the Advanced Photon Source (GM/CA @ APS).

== Biography ==
Smith is native of Pennsylvania and studied chemistry as a National Merit Scholar at Indiana University of Pennsylvania (BS, 1973). She continued her study at the University of Wisconsin-Madison (Ph.D., 1978) in structure in biology under Dr. M. Sundaralingam supervision. she continued to do her postdoctoral work with Wayne Hendrickson at the Naval Research Laboratory as a National Research Council Research Fellow.

== Research ==
Smith's research group focus on the understanding of proteins to the molecular level through structural biology. The main experimental technique employed in her lab is X-ray crystallography used to elucidate protein structures. Some of her research findings solved Crystal structures. Janet's lab has also worked towards method development for rapid structure determination. Her lab contributed to the development of multiwavelength anomalous diffraction (MAD) used routinely for structure determination.

Her research group have revealed the molecular structure of a protein produced by the Zika virus that is thought to be involved in the virus's reproduction and its interaction with a host's immune system.

== Award and Honors ==
1. Fellow of the American Association for the Advancement of Science (2007)
2. National Institutes of Health MERIT award recipient (1998–2008)
- Mildred Cohn Award in Biological Chemistry (2022)
