= Marla Feller =

Professor of Biological Sciences

- Born: Marla Beth Feller
- Education: University of California, Berkeley (AB, PhD)
- Awards: Fellow of the American Association for the Advancement of Science (2017)
- Scientific career
- Workplaces: University of California, Berkeley; Bell Labs; University of California, San Diego; National Institutes of Health
- Thesis: The application of the symmetry properties of optical second harmonic generation of studies of interfaces and gases (1991)
- Doctoral advisor: Yuen-Ron Shen
- Website: fellerlab.squarespace.com/people

Marla Beth Feller is the Paul Licht Distinguished Professor in Biological Sciences and Member of the Helen Wills Neuroscience Institute at the University of California, Berkeley. She studies the mechanisms that underpin the assembly of neural circuits during development. Feller is a Fellow of the American Association for the Advancement of Science, member of the American Academy of Arts and Sciences and member of the National Academy of Sciences.

== Early life and education ==
Feller was inspired to work in physics at high school, where she was taught by a graduate student. She studied physics at the University of California, Berkeley and graduated in 1985. She remained there for her graduate studies, working under the supervision of Yuen-Ron Shen on liquid crystals. During her doctorate she played Ultimate Frisbee, and may have been one of the founders of the University of California, Berkeley women's Ultimate team. She completed her doctoral research in 1991, and embarked on a course in neural systems and behaviour at the Woods Hole Research Center.

== Research and career ==
After her PhD, Feller was a postdoctoral researcher at Bell Labs from 1992 to 1994, where she worked in the biological computation department with David W. Tank. She returned to the University of California, Berkeley, where she worked alongside Carla J. Shatz as a Miller postdoctoral fellow. Here she started to apply novel imaging approaches to neuroscience. Feller was appointed as a tenure-track investigator at the National Institutes of Health in 1998. She joined the University of California, San Diego in 2000, first as the Silvo Varon Assistant Professor of Neuroregeneration and eventually as an associate professor. Feller was recruited to the University of California, Berkeley in 2007 and made head of the Division of Neurobiology in 2013.

Her research evaluates the mechanisms that underpin the developmental assembly of neural circuits. She primarily investigates the retina, combining two-photon excitation microscopy and electrophysiology to establish how young retinas generate retinal waves, and the role that these waves play in retinal development. She has monitored the intrinsically photosensitive retinal ganglion cell (ipRGC) in newborn mice, identifying that they communicate with one another as part of a network that serves to boost retinal eye sensitivity. She has studied the ipRGC in mice, showing that even before the retina is fully developed a mouse can detect light. Her research also considers the organisation of neural circuitry that dictates directional sensitivity in the retina.

=== Awards and honours ===
- 2001 Kavli Frontiers of Science Fellow
- 2002 McKnight Foundation Scholar Award
- 2010 University of Washington Roger Brown Loucks Lectureship
- 2011 École des Neuroscience of Paris Sabbatical
- 2011 France-Berkeley Fund Award
- 2014 Brian Boycott Prize
- 2016 University at Buffalo Pioneers in Neuroscience Award
- 2017 Elected a Fellow of the American Association for the Advancement of Science
- 2018 University of California, Berkeley Distinguished Faculty Mentor Award
- 2020 University of California, Berkeley Distinguished Teaching Award
- 2023 Elected Fellow of the American Academy of Arts and Sciences
- 2023 Elected National Academy of Sciences
- 2026 John E. Lisman Memorial Lecture

=== Selected publications ===
- Feller, Marla Beth (May 24, 1996). "Requirement for Cholinergic Synaptic Transmission in the Propagation of Spontaneous Retinal Waves". Science. 272 (5265): 1182–1187. Bibcode:1996Sci...272.1182F. doi:10.1126/science.272.5265.1182. PMID 8638165. S2CID 11295283.
- Feller, Marla Beth (2010). "Mechanisms underlying spontaneous patterned activity in developing neural circuits". Nature Reviews Neuroscience. 11 (1): 18–29. doi:10.1038/nrn2759. PMC 2902252. PMID 19953103.
- Feller, Marla Beth (1999). "Spontaneous Correlated Activity in Developing Neural Circuits". Neuron. 22 (4): 653–656. doi:10.1016/s0896-6273(00)80724-2. PMID 10230785. S2CID 18638084.
