= Maureen Neitz =

American vision scientist

Maureen E. Neitz is an American vision scientist whose research includes work on color vision and color blindness and the prevention of nearsightedness. She holds the Ray H. Hill Endowed Chair in Ophthalmology at the University of Washington.

Neitz earned a bachelor's degree in molecular biology from San Jose State University in 1979, and a PhD in biochemistry and molecular biology from the University of California, Santa Barbara in 1986. After continuing at UC Santa Barbara as a postdoctoral researcher, she joined the faculty at the Medical College of Wisconsin in 1991. She moved to the University of Washington in 2008.

Neitz is married to and works with Jay Neitz, also a vision scientist. They married in 1981 and began working together in ophthalmology in 1986, bringing together expertise in neuroscience from Jay and genetics from Maureen. In 2010, Neitz and her husband Jay were awarded the Pepose Award in Vision Science by Brandeis University.
