= Roger D. Cone =

Life sciences researcher

Roger D. Cone is the Mary Sue Coleman Director of the Life Sciences Institute and the Vice Provost for the Biosciences Initiative at the University of Michigan; a member of the editorial board for the journal Cell Metabolism; and a member of the National Academies of Sciences and Medicine. He is a noted researcher in the biological underpinnings of obesity, anorexia, cachexia and other eating and metabolic disorders.

He received his B.A. in Biochemistry, summa cum laude from Princeton University in 1980 and his Ph.D. in Biology from the Massachusetts Institute of Technology in 1985 under the mentorship of the gene therapy pioneer Richard C. Mulligan. He is largely cited in his field.

In 2008 he moved to Vanderbilt University to be Professor and Chairman of the Department of Molecular Physiology and Biophysics.

== Awards and achievements ==
Cone's research is groundbreaking on how the brain controls body weight. In 2012, he became a Fellow of the American Association for the Advancement of Science and, four years later, elected to the National Academy of Medicine. He also served as Director of the Institute for Obesity and Metabolism at Vanderbilt University, Associate Director of the Diabetes Research and Training Center, and as Faculty Head of Murray House.
