= Sum frequency generation spectroscopy =

Surface-sensitive spectroscopy technique

Sum frequency generation spectroscopy (SFG) is a nonlinear laser spectroscopy technique based on sum-frequency generation and used to analyze surfaces and interfaces. It can be expressed as a sum of a series of Lorentz oscillators. In a typical SFG setup, two laser beams mix at an interface and generate an output beam with a frequency equal to the sum of the two input frequencies, traveling in a direction given by the sum of the incident beams' wavevectors.

The technique was developed in 1987 by Yuen-Ron Shen and his students as an extension of second harmonic generation spectroscopy and rapidly applied to deduce the composition, orientation distributions, and structural information of molecules at gas–solid, gas–liquid and liquid–solid interfaces. Soon after its invention, Philippe Guyot-Sionnest extended the technique to obtain the first measurements of electronic and vibrational dynamics at surfaces. SFG has advantages in its ability to be monolayer surface sensitive, ability to be performed in situ (for example aqueous surfaces and in gases), and its capability to provide ultrafast time resolution. SFG gives information complementary to infrared and Raman spectroscopy.

== Theory ==
IR-visible sum frequency generation spectroscopy uses two laser beams (an infrared probe, and a visible pump) that spatially and temporally overlap at a surface of a material or the interface between two media. An output beam is generated at a frequency of the sum of the two input beams. The two input beams must be able to access the surface with sufficiently high intensities, and the output beam must be able to reflect off (or transmit through) the surface in order to be detected. Broadly speaking, most sum frequency spectrometers can be considered as one of two types, scanning systems (those with narrow bandwidth probe beams) and broadband systems (those with broad bandwidth probe beams). For the former type of spectrometer, the pump beam is a visible wavelength laser held at a constant frequency, and the other (the probe beam) is a tunable infrared laser — by tuning the IR laser, the system can scan across molecular resonances and obtain a vibrational spectrum of the interfacial region in a piecewise fashion. In a broadband spectrometer, the visible pump beam is once again held at a fixed frequency, while the probe beam is spectrally broad. These laser beams overlap at a surface, but may access a wider range of molecular resonances simultaneously than a scanning spectrometer, and hence spectra can be acquired significantly faster, allowing the ability to perform time-resolved measurements with interfacial sensitivity.

=== Nonlinear susceptibility ===
For a given nonlinear optical process, the polarization $\overrightarrow{P}$ which generates the output is given by

$$\overrightarrow{P} = \epsilon_0\left(\chi^{(1)}\overrightarrow{E} + \chi^{(2)}\overrightarrow{E}^2 + \chi^{(3)}\overrightarrow{E}^3 + \dots + \chi^{(n)}\overrightarrow{E}^n\right) = \epsilon_0 \sum_{i=1}^n \chi^{(i)}\overrightarrow{E}^{i}$$

where $\chi^{(i)}$ is the $i$th order nonlinear susceptibility, for $i \in [1,2,3,\dots,n]$.

It is worth noting that all the even order susceptibilities become zero in centrosymmetric media. A proof of this is as follows.

Let $I_{inv}$ be the inversion operator, defined by $I_{inv} \overrightarrow{L} = -\overrightarrow{L}$ for some arbitrary vector $\overrightarrow{L}$. Then applying $I_{inv}$ to the left and right hand side of the polarization equation above gives

$$I_{inv}\overrightarrow{P} = -\overrightarrow{P} = I_{inv}\left(\epsilon_0 \sum_{i=1}^n \chi^{(i)}\overrightarrow{E}^{i}\right) = \epsilon_0\sum_{i=1}^n \chi^{(i)}\left(I_{inv}\overrightarrow{E}\right)^{i} = \epsilon_0\sum_{i=1}^n (-1)^i\chi^{(i)}\overrightarrow{E}^{i}.$$

Adding together this equation with the original polarization equation then gives

$$\overrightarrow{P}-\overrightarrow{P} = \overrightarrow{0} = \epsilon_0\sum_{i=1}^n \left(1 + (-1)^i\right)\chi^{(i)}\overrightarrow{E}^{i} = 2\epsilon_0\sum_{i=1}^{n/2} \chi^{(2i)}\overrightarrow{E}^{(2i)}$$

which implies $\chi^{(2i)} = 0$ for $i \in [1,2,3,\dots,n/2]$ in centrosymmetric media. Q.E.D.

[Note 1: The final equality can be proven by mathematical induction, by considering two cases in the inductive step; where $k$ is odd and $k$ is even.]

[Note 2: This proof holds for the case where $n$ is even. Setting $m = n - 1$ gives the odd case and the remainder of the proof is the same.]

As a second-order nonlinear process, SFG is dependent on the 2nd order susceptibility $\chi^{(2)}$, which is a third rank tensor. This limits what samples are accessible for SFG. Centrosymmetric media include the bulk of gases, liquids, and most solids under the assumption of the electric-dipole approximation, which neglects the signal generated by multipoles and magnetic moments. At an interface between two different materials or two centrosymmetric media, the inversion symmetry is broken and an SFG signal can be generated. This suggests that the resulting spectra represent a thin layer of molecules. A signal is found when there is a net polar orientation.

=== SFG intensity ===
The output beam is collected by a detector and its intensity $I$ is calculated using

$$I(\omega_3;\omega_1,\omega_2)\propto|\chi^{(2)}|^2I_1(\omega_1)I_2(\omega_2)$$

where $\omega_1$ is the visible frequency, $\omega_2$ is the IR frequency and $\omega_3 = \omega_1 + \omega_2$ is the SFG frequency. The constant of proportionality varies across literature, many of them including the product of the square of the output frequency, $\omega_2$ and the squared secant of the reflection angle, $\sec^2 \beta$. Other factors include index of refractions for the three beams.

The second order susceptibility has two contributions

$$\chi = \chi_{nr} + \chi_r$$

where $\chi_{nr}$ is the non-resonating contribution and $\chi_{r}$ is the resonating contribution. The non-resonating contribution is assumed to be from electronic responses. Although this contribution has often been considered to be constant over the spectrum, because it is generated simultaneously with the resonant response, the two responses must compete for intensity. This competition shapes the nonresonant contribution in the presence of resonant features by resonant attenuation. Because it is not currently known how to adequately correct for nonresonant interferences, it is very important to experimentally isolate the resonant contributions from any nonresonant interference, often done using the technique of nonresonant suppression.

The resonating contribution is from the vibrational modes and shows changes in resonance. It can be expressed as a sum of a series of Lorentz oscillators

$$\sum_q \frac{A_q}{\omega_2-\omega_{0_q}+i\Gamma_q}$$

where $A$ is the strength or amplitude, $\omega_0$ is the resonant frequency, $\Gamma$ is the damping or linewidth coefficient (FWHM), and each $q > 1$ indexes the normal (resonant vibrational) mode. The amplitude is a product of $\mu$, the induced dipole moment, and $\alpha$, the polarizability. Together, this indicates that the transition must be both IR and Raman active.

The above equations can be combined to form

$$\chi = |\chi_{nr}|e^{i\phi} + \sum_q \frac{A_q}{\omega_2-\omega_{0_q}+i\Gamma_q}$$

which is used to model the SFG output over a range of wavenumbers. When the SFG system scans over a vibrational mode of the surface molecule, the output intensity is resonantly enhanced. In a graphical analysis of the output intensity versus wavenumber, this is represented by Lorentzian peaks. Depending on the system, inhomogeneous broadening and interference between peaks may occur. The Lorentz profile can be convoluted with a Gaussian intensity distribution to better fit the intensity distribution.

=== Orientation information ===
From the second order susceptibility, it is possible to ascertain information about the orientation of molecules at the surface. $\chi^{(2)}$ describes how the molecules at the interface respond to the input beam. A change in the net orientation of the polar molecules results in a change of sign of $\chi^{(2)}$. As a rank 3 tensor, the individual elements provide information about the orientation. For a surface that has azimuthal symmetry, i.e. assuming $C_{\infty}$ rod symmetry, only seven of the twenty seven tensor elements are nonzero (with four being linearly independent), which are

$$\chi^{(2)}_{zzz},$$
$$\chi^{(2)}_{xxz} = \chi^{(2)}_{yyz},$$
$\chi^{(2)}_{xzx} = \chi^{(2)}_{yzy},$ and
$$\chi^{(2)}_{zxx} = \chi^{(2)}_{zyy}.$$

The tensor elements can be determined by using two different polarizers, one for the electric field vector perpendicular to the plane of incidence, labeled S, and one for the electric field vector parallel to the plane of incidence, labeled P. Four combinations are sufficient: PPP, SSP, SPS, PSS, with the letters listed in decreasing frequency, so the first is for the sum frequency, the second is for the visible beam, and the last is for the infrared beam. The four combinations give rise to four different intensities given by

$$I_{PPP}=|f'_zf_zf_z\chi_{zzz}^{(2)}+f'_zf_if_i\chi_{zii}^{(2)}+f'_if_zf_i\chi_{zii}^{(2)}+f'_if_if_z\chi_{iiz}^{(2)}|^2,$$
$$I_{SSP}=|f'_if_if_z\chi_{iiz}^{(2)}|^2,$$
$I_{SPS}=|f'_if_zf_i\chi_{zii}^{(2)}|^2,$ and
$$I_{PSS}=|f'_zf_if_i\chi_{zii}^{(2)}|^2$$

where index $i$ is of the interfacial $xy$-plane, and $f$ and $f'$ are the linear and nonlinear Fresnel factors.

By taking the tensor elements and applying the correct transformations, the orientation of the molecules on the surface can be found.

== Experimental setup ==
Since SFG is a second-order nonlinear optical phenomenon, one of the main technical concerns in an experimental setup is being able to generate a signal strong enough to detect, with discernible peaks and narrow bandwidths. Picosecond and femtosecond pulse width lasers are often used due to the high peak field intensities. Common sources include Ti:Sapphire lasers, which can easily operate in the femtosecond regime, or Neodymium based lasers, for picosecond operation.

Whilst shorter pulses results in higher peak intensities, the spectral bandwidth of the laser pulse is also increased, which can place a limit on the spectral resolution of the output of an experimental setup. This can be compensated for by narrowing the bandwidth of the pump pulse, resulting in a tradeoff for desired properties.

In modern experimental setups, the tuneable range of the probe pulse is augmented by optical parametric generation (OPG), optical parametric oscillation (OPO), and optical parametric amplification (OPA) systems.

Signal strength can be improved by using special geometries, such as a total internal reflection setup which uses a prism to change the angles so they are close to the critical angles, allowing the SFG signal to be generated at its critical angle, enhancing the signal.

Common detector setups utilize a monochromator and a photomultiplier for filtering and detecting.
