= Frank Werblin =

Frank Werblin is Professor of the Graduate School, Division of Neurobiology, at the University of California, Berkeley.

== Education ==
Werblin earned his Ph.D. at Johns Hopkins University studying with Professor John Dowling. He was a Guggenheim Fellow, and is noted for discovering the functional and morphological properties of the main retinal neural cell types underlying visual information processing in the retina and for developing the retina slice preparation that is now used universally by retinal researchers.

== Career ==
In 1969, Werblin and Dowling published their seminal studies of the electrophysiological response properties of all the major neuron types in the vertebrate retina. This paper described, for the first time, the connections between all the major types of retina neurons and showed how interactions between these neurons created the visual code that was sent via the optic nerve to the brain. To accomplish this, the authors combined information about the electrical responses of the neurons with anatomical connectivity uncovered by electron microscopic identification of the neural pathways. The micropipette used to record from each cell contained a dye so that each physiologically identified cell could also be morphologically characterized within the layers of the retina. In 1978, Werblin published the first study of an isolated retinal slice preparation. Werblin invented and developed a clever slicing procedure that allowed for a quicker and easier means to access all of the neurons in the various layers of the retina, while leaving the cells largely intact with their supporting matrix and synaptic connections and electrical junctions. This allowed, the researcher for the first time to target specific neurons in the retina for electrical recording. However, because the retinal slice was isolated from the supportive retinal pigment epithelium (PE) that enables the light responses of photoreceptors, light evoked responses were not reported until the retinal slices were constructed with PE still attached. In this manner, whole cell patch recording of amacrine neurons in the salamander retina allowed light evoked excitatory post-synaptic currents (EPSCs) to be measured for the first time, as well as their light elicited spiking potentials, and voltage-gated currents. The new slice technique allowed, for the first time, a neuron to be characterized by its natural stimulus (light), and then to be fully characterized by its morphological, histological, electrophysiological (EPSCs, voltage gated currents, and graded and spike potentials), and chemical identity. The new light-responsive slice methodology also allowed interplexiform cells to be identified and characterized for the first time, as well as sustained and transient amacrine neurons. Precise localization of synaptic inputs to the cell, and localization of functional receptors in the cell was achieved. The slice technique would become a standard for retinal research and be developed for other animals with much smaller neurons, including the Zebrafish and rat. Werblin would then use these data to construct elegant models of visual information processing in the different layers of the retina.

In 1990 Werblin was honored with the Friedenwald Award from the ARVO organization. In 2017, Werblin received the Pepose Award in Vision Science from Brandeis University.

Werblin is also the inventor of Visionize a device/software that uses a smartphone to remap the visual world to help low-vision patients regain visual function. With this gained facility, patients who were functionally blind regain sight and re-enter the world of the sighted, recognizing faces, shopping at supermarkets, going to theater and sports events..

Werblin is also a Co-Founder, Chief Scientist of IrisVision, a more advanced technology device that connects clinicians with patients remotely through a portable vision laboratory that is located in the patient's home and controlled remotely by the clinician. Clinics can serve patients .

== Selected publications ==
- Lin, Li-Ju; Wu, Chung-Yu; Roska, Botond; Werblin, Frank; Balya, David; Roska, TÁmas (2007). "A Neuromorphic Chip That Imitates the ON Brisk Transient Ganglion Cell Set in the Retinas of Rabbits". IEEE Sensors Journal. 7 (9): 1248–1261. Bibcode:2007ISenJ...7.1248L. doi:10.1109/JSEN.2007.901194. ISSN 1530-437X.
- Balya, D.; Roska, B.; Nemeth, E.; Roska, T.; Werblin, F. (2000). "A qualitative model-framework for spatio-temporal effects in vertebrate retinas". Proceedings of the 2000 6th IEEE International Workshop on Cellular Neural Networks and their Applications (CNNA 2000) (Cat. No.00TH8509). IEEE. pp. 165–170. doi:10.1109/CNNA.2000.876839. ISBN 978-0-7803-6344-1.
- Zarandy, A.; Orzo, L.; Grawes, E.; Werblin, F. (1999). "CNN-based models for color vision and visual illusions". IEEE Transactions on Circuits and Systems I: Fundamental Theory and Applications. 46 (2): 229–238. doi:10.1109/81.747190.
