= Life Sciences Institute =

Research institution at the University of Michigan, Ann Arbor

Coordinates: 42.279700°N 83.734091°W

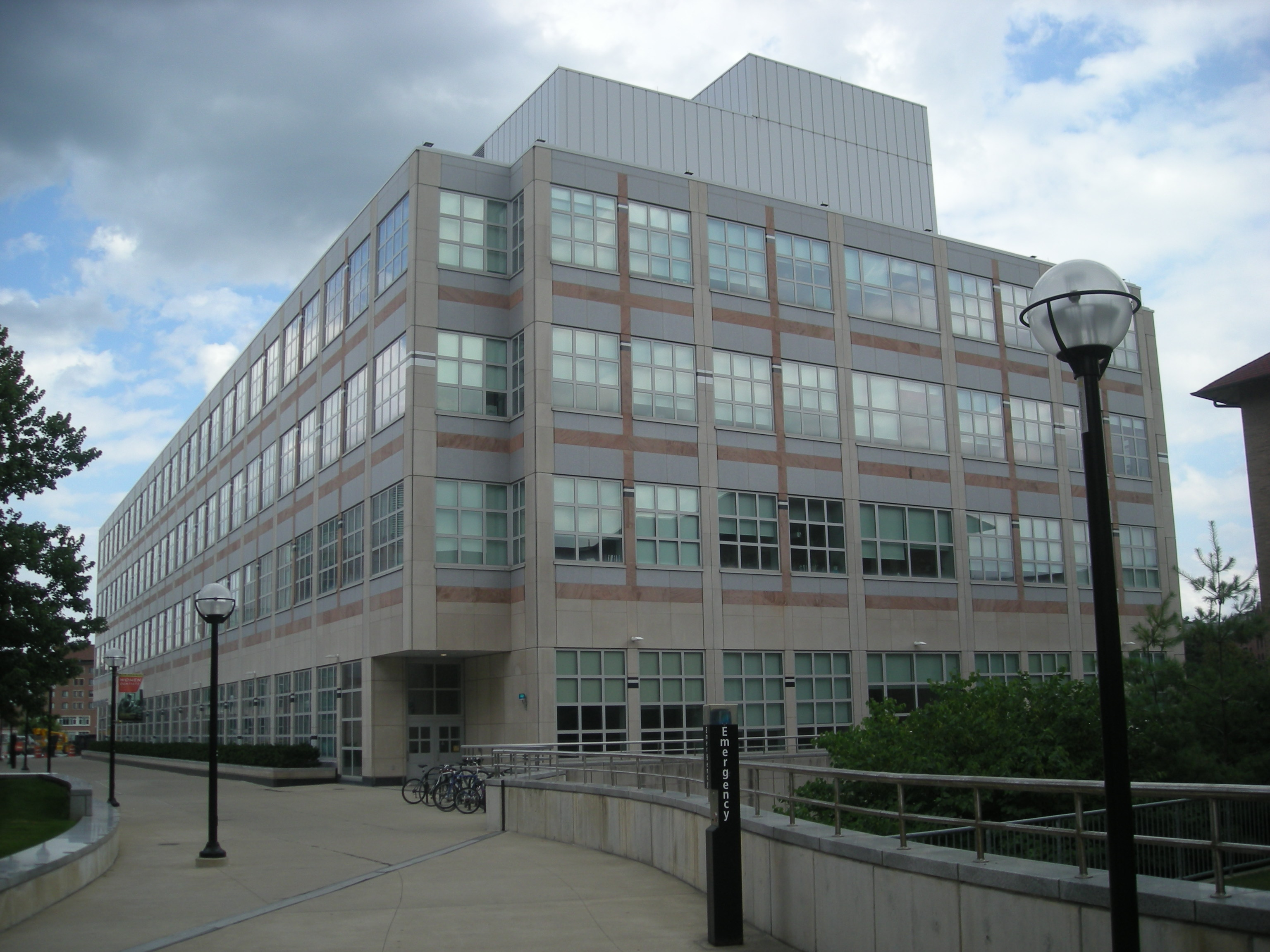
- The Life Sciences Institute in August 2013
- Established: 1999
- Research type: Basic (non-clinical)
- Field of research: Biochemistry, Cell Biology, Chemical biology, Computational Biology, Genetics, Neuroscience, Structural Biology, Stem Cell Biology, Medicine
- Director: Roger D. Cone
- Address: 210 Washtenaw Ave. Ann Arbor, MI 48109
- Location: Ann Arbor, MI
- Affiliations: University of Michigan
- Website: www.lsi.umich.edu

The Life Sciences Institute (LSI) is a collaborative, multidisciplinary research institution located on the campus of the University of Michigan in Ann Arbor. It encompasses 27 faculty-led teams from 13 schools and departments throughout U-M.

Of the university's $823 million in research expenditures, more than half is allocated for research in the life sciences, and the LSI is a cornerstone of this effort.

== History ==
In 1998, the University of Michigan formed a commission to create a vision for the future of the life sciences at the university. In response to the commission's recommendations, in 1999, the Regents of the University of Michigan unanimously approved the construction of the Life Sciences Institute, noting that "the creation of a life sciences institute will eliminate the structural barriers to a shared research and learning experience that will be valuable for both basic and applied research." Initial funding of $100 million was provided for the creation of wet lab space, in addition to the $130 million for the endowment and startup costs.

The first faculty members moved into the building and opened their labs in September 2003, and the institute opened in May 2004. That same year, the institute's first two research cores opened, supporting high-throughput screening and structural biology research : the Center for Structural Biology and the Center for Chemical Genomics. The cryo-electron microscopy facility opened in 2009, expanding the institute's structural biology capabilities. In 2018, with support from the U-M Biosciences Initiative, the institute began expanding the cryo-EM program and also launched its Natural Products Discovery Core.

In 2021, the building that houses the institute was renamed Mary Sue Coleman Hall, in honor of President Emerita Mary Sue Coleman.

=== Leadership ===
Roger D. Cone began his tenure as the Mary Sue Coleman Director of the University of Michigan Life Sciences Institute in September 2016. A leading researcher in brain regulation of body weight, Cone also serves as vice provost and director of U-M's biosciences initiative. The managing director is Anna Schork.

The institute's first director was Jack E. Dixon. In 2002, Mary Sue Coleman, U-M's president, appointed cell biologist and expert on insulin signaling Alan R. Saltiel as director. Saltiel served as the director until 2015, followed by interim director Stephen Weiss, who led the institute from 2015 to 2016.

== Research ==
The Life Sciences Institute is a multidisciplinary basic science research institute, with focal strengths in chemical and structural biology. Its 23 faculty members lead labs specializing in a wide range of life sciences disciplines, including:

- cell biology
- genetics
- cancer biology
- metabolism and obesity
- neuroscience and neurodegeneration
- infectious disease
- structural biology
- chemical biology
- chemistry

In addition to faculty labs, the institute is home to research cores that provide services to the institute, the university, and external partners:

=== Center for Chemical Genomics ===
A high-throughput screening (HTS) facility is a central component of the Center for Chemical Genomics (CCG). This core facility is designed to assist academic researchers in carrying out high-throughput screens of chemical libraries and to identify new tools for biological research.

=== Center for Structural Biology ===
The Center for Structural Biology (CSB) is a "collaboratory" for X-ray crystallography, crystallization and protein engineering, and is a comprehensive structural biology resource for researchers at the University of Michigan and surrounding area. The center includes:

- High-Throughput Protein Laboratory for protein engineering
- Protein Purification Facilities for small- and large-scale protein production
- Macromolecular Crystallization & Crystallography Laboratories for solving crystal structures of biological molecules
- On-site X-ray facility
- Access to high energy synchrotron radiation at Argonne National Laboratory through the Life Science Collaborative Access Team (LS-CAT)

=== Cryo-EM Facility ===
The cryo-EM facility at the Life Sciences Institute offers a wide range of advanced microscopes and technologies for cryo-electron microscopy, cryo-electron tomography, and correlative light and electron microscopy (CLEM).

=== Natural Products Discovery Core ===
The Natural Products Discovery Core is home to a library of more than 45,000 natural product extracts, as well as genome mining and bioinformatics services.

== Facility ==
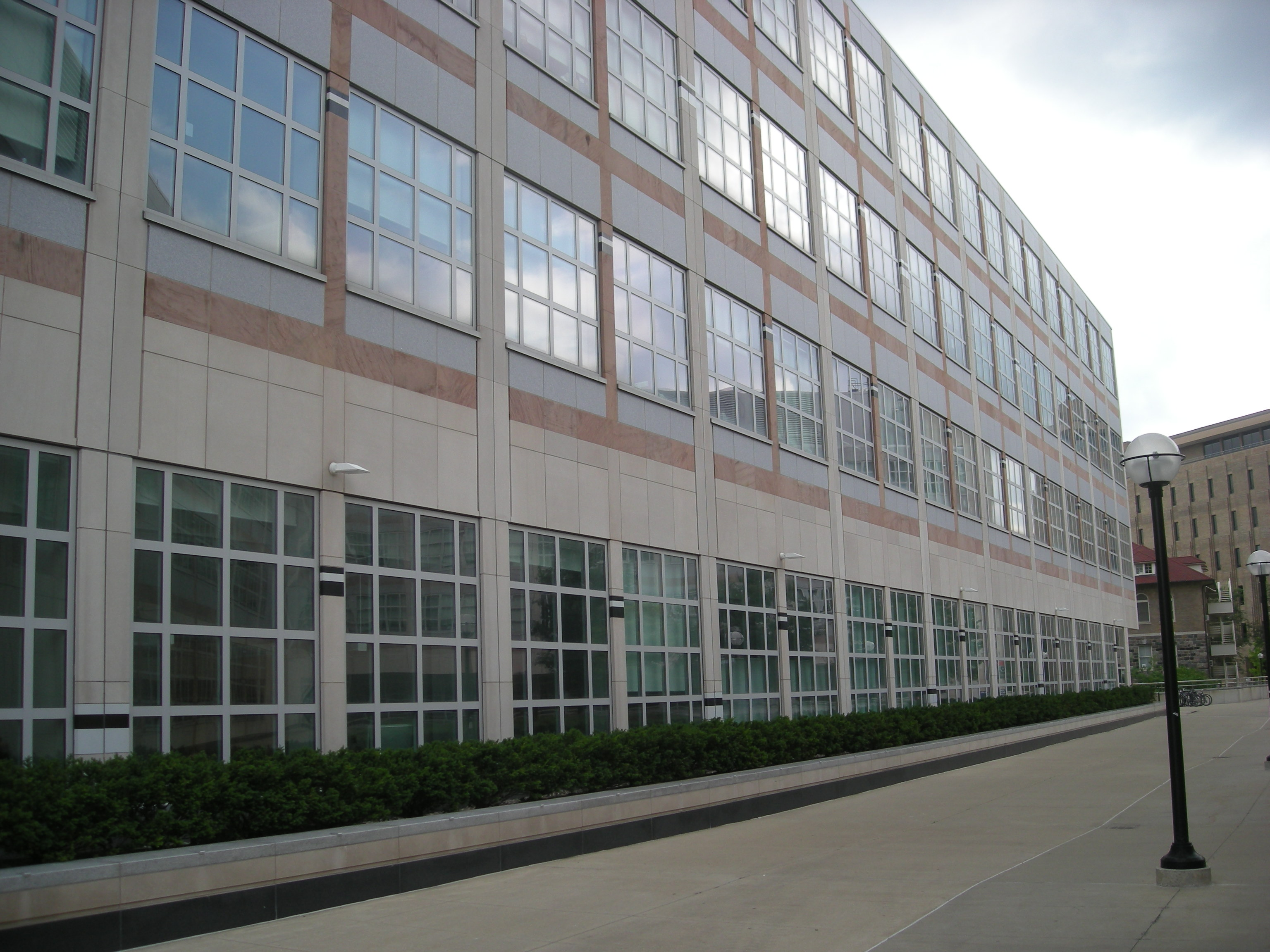
The Life Sciences Institute building in August 2013

The LSI is a 235,000 square feet building with six floors, located between U-M's central campus and the university's medical campus in Ann Arbor. Completed in 2003, the building includes housing for wet lab and laboratory support spaces, administration offices, PI offices, interaction spaces, core laboratory areas, a combined gallery/lobby space and a small library.

The exterior design of the building is intended to harmonize with other campus loft-style structures, while also meeting the needs of a modern research institute.

== LSI Symposium ==
The LSI Annual Symposium invites leading scientists from different disciplines to converge around a single topic. Past symposia have been designed to explore genetic insights into biology and disease, cancer, stem cell biology, evolutionary biology, autophagy and diseases of the nervous system.

== Notable faculty ==
- Roger D. Cone
- Daniel J. Klionsky
- Anna K. Mapp.
- Alison R.H. Narayan
- Janet L. Smith
