= Constance Cepko =

American developmental biologist

Connie Cepko
- Born: Constance Louise Cepko; Laurel, Maryland, U.S.
- Education: University of Maryland, College Park; MIT
- Scientific career
- Fields: Neuroscience; Developmental biology; Retinas
- Workplaces: MIT; Harvard University
- Thesis: Interactions of the Adenovirus 100k and Hexon Proteins: Analysis using Monoclonal Antibodies and Temperature Sensitive Mutants (1982)
- Doctoral advisor: Phillip Allen Sharp
- Other academic advisors: Richard Mulligan
- Website: genepath.med.harvard.edu/~cepko; www.hhmi.org/scientists/constance-l-cepko

Constance Louise Cepko is a developmental biologist and geneticist in Harvard Medical School. She is best known for her contributions in understanding the developmental biology of vertebrate central nervous systems.

== Education ==
She was born in Laurel, Maryland. She received her B.S. in biochemistry and microbiology at the University of Maryland College of Computer, Mathematical, and Natural Sciences. She completed her Ph.D. at MIT in 1982 advised by Phil Sharp.

== Career and research ==
As a postdoctoral research fellow with Richard C. Mulligan she studied retroviral vectors that she used to study the development of the retina. She is the former head of the Biological and Biomedical Sciences graduate program at Harvard Medical School.

== Awards and honors ==
Cepko was elected to the National Academy of Sciences in 2002. In 2011, she received the Bressler Prize in Vision Science awarded to under-recognized scientists and clinicians in their field for her work in retina development. In 2019, she was selected by Brandeis University to give the Lisman Memorial Lecture in Vision Science.
