= Richard C. Mulligan =

American scientist

- Education: Massachusetts Institute of Technology, Stanford University
- Known for: Gene Therapy
- Scientific career
- Fields: Gene Therapy
- Workplaces: Massachusetts Institute of Technology, Harvard Medical School, Sana Biotechnology
- Doctoral advisor: Paul Berg
- Other academic advisors: Alexander Rich, David Baltimore, Phillip Allen Sharp
- Notable students: James Wilson (scientist), Constance Cepko, David Sanders (biologist), Roger D. Cone

Richard C. Mulligan (born 1954) is an American scientist who is the Mallinckrodt Professor of Genetics at Harvard Medical School, the Director of the Harvard Gene Therapy Initiative and a visiting scientist at the Koch Institute for Integrative Cancer Research at the Massachusetts Institute of Technology. He is also the head of SanaX at Sana Biotechnology.

== Research and career ==
Mulligan started his career in gene therapy as an undergraduate in biology in Alexander Rich's lab at MIT and was involved with early work controlling gene expression using SV40. He would earn his PhD in biochemistry at Stanford University in 1980 working with Paul Berg to develop viral vectors to express human and bacterial genes. He would then do his postdoctoral training at the Center for Cancer Research at MIT with David Baltimore and Phillip Sharp. He would join the faculty of molecular biology and was a member of the Whitehead Institute for Biomedical Research. During that time, he was a founding member of the Recombinant DNA Advisory Committee (RAC). In 1996, he joined Children's Hospital and Harvard to become the director of the Harvard Gene Therapy Initiative and an investigator of the Howard Hughes Medical Institute.

Mulligan is an active investor as the founding partner and senior managing director of Sarissa Capital Management from 2013 to 2016 along with Alex Denner when they worked together with Carl Icahn. He would then join Icahn Capital as a portfolio manager in 2017. He serves as Director of Enzon Pharmaceuticals, and Biogen Idec, Inc.

== Awards ==
- 1981 MacArthur Fellows Program
- 1983 Searle Scholars Program
- 1993 ASBMB-Amgen Award

== Works ==
- Lindemann, D., Patriquin, E., Feng, S. and Mulligan, R.C. 1997 "Versatile retrovirus vector systems for regulated gene expression in vitro and in vivo". Molecular Medicine 3:466-476.
- Goodell, M.A., Rosenzweig, H-.K., Marks, D.G., DeMaria, M., Paradis, G., Grupp, S.A., Sieff, C.A., Mulligan, R.C. and Johnson, R.P. 1997. "Dye efflux studies suggest the existence of CD34-negative/low hematopoietic stem cells in multiple species". Nature Medicine 3:1337–1345.
- Mach, N., Lantz, C.S., Galli, S.J., Reznikoff, G., Mihm, M., Small, C., Granstein, R., Beissert, S., Sadelain, M., Mulligan, R.C. and Dranoff, G. 1998. "Involvement of interleukin-3 in delayed-type hypersensitivity". Blood 92:778-783.
