= Nature Chemical Biology =

- Discipline: Chemical biology
- Language: English
- Edited by: Russell Johnson

Publication details
- History: 2005–present
- Publisher: Nature Portfolio
- Frequency: Monthly
- Open access: Hybrid
- Impact factor: 13.5 (2024)

Standard abbreviations
- ISO 4: Nat. Chem. Biol.

Indexing
- CODEN: NCBABT
- ISSN: 1552-4450 (print); 1552-4469 (web)
- LCCN: 2004215507
- OCLC no.: 56476033

Links
- Journal homepage; Online archive; National Library Of Medicine

Nature Chemical Biology is a monthly peer-reviewed scientific journal published by Nature Portfolio. It was established in June 2005 by founding Chief Editor Terry L. Sheppard as part of Nature Publishing Group. Sheppard was the Chief Editor of the journal 2004–2022. The current editor-in-chief is Russell Johnson.

== Aims and scope ==
The publishing focus of Nature Chemical Biology is a forum for original research and commentary in chemical biology. Published topics encompass concepts and research methods in chemistry, biology, and related disciplines with the result of controlling biological systems at the molecular level. Authors (contributors) are chemical biologists, also chemists involved in interdisciplinary research between chemistry and biology, along with biologists who produce research results in understanding and controlling biological processes at the molecular level.

Interdisciplinary research in chemistry and biology is emphasized. The journal's main focus in this area is fundamental research which illuminates available chemical and biological tools, as well as mechanisms underpinning biological processes. Also included are studies articulating applications at the molecular level when combining these two disciplines. Emphasis is also given to innovations in methods and theory produced from cross-disciplinary studies.

The readership for Nature Chemical Biology, which also functions as a forum, are researchers in the chemical and life sciences. Besides original research articles, this journal also publishes reviews, perspectives, highlights of research in this and other journals, correspondence, and commentaries.

== Abstracting and indexing ==
Nature Chemical Biology is indexed in the following databases:

- Chemical Abstracts Service - CASSI
- Science Citation Index
- Science Citation Index Expanded
- Current Contents - Life Sciences
- BIOSIS Previews

According to the Journal Citation Reports, the journal has a 2021 impact factor of 16.290, ranking it 13th out of 296 journals in the category "Biochemistry & Molecular Biology".

== See also ==
- Nature
- Nature Physics
- Nature Materials
