= Yuen-Ron Shen =

Chinese physicist

- 沈元壤
- Born: Shanghai
- Education: National Taiwan University (BS); Stanford University (MS); Harvard University (PhD)
- Scientific career
- Fields: Physics
- Workplaces: University of California, Berkeley
- Thesis: Faraday rotation of rare-earth ions in CaF₂ (1963)
- Doctoral advisor: Nicolaas Bloembergen
- Doctoral students: Marla Feller

Yuen-Ron Shen (Chinese: 沈元壤; pinyin: Shěn Yuánrǎng) is a Taiwanese physicist. He is a professor emeritus of physics at the University of California, Berkeley, known for his work on non-linear optics.

== Education and career ==
Shen was born in Shanghai and graduated from National Taiwan University. He received his Ph.D. in Applied Physics from Harvard under physicist and Nobel Laureate Nicolaas Bloembergen in 1963, and joined the department of physics at Berkeley in 1964. In the early years, Shen was probably best known for his work on self-focusing and filament propagation of laser beams in materials. These fundamental studies enabled the creation of ultrafast supercontinuum light sources. In the 1970s and 1980s, he collaborated with Yuan T. Lee on the study of multiphoton dissociation of molecular clusters. The molecular-beam photofragmentation translational spectroscopy that they developed has clarified much of the initial confusion concerning the dynamics of infrared multiphoton dissociation processes. In the 1980s and 1990s, Shen developed various nonlinear optics methods for the study of material surfaces and interfaces. Among these techniques, second-harmonic generation and sum frequency generation spectroscopy are best known and now widely used by scientists from various fields. He has collaborated with Gabor Somorjai on the use of the technique of Sum Frequency Generation Spectroscopy to study catalyst surfaces. He is the author of the book The Principles of Nonlinear Optics. Shen belongs to the prolific J. J. Thomson academic lineage tree. Currently, Shen works in U. C. Berkeley and Fudan University in Shanghai.

== Awards and honors ==
- American Academy of Arts and Sciences, member 1990
- National Academy of Sciences, member 1995
- Academia Sinica (Taiwan), member 1990
- Chinese Academy of Sciences, member 1996
- American Physical Society, fellow
- Optical Society of America, fellow
- American Association for the Advancement of Science, fellow
- Sloan Research Fellowship, 1966–68
- Guggenheim Fellow, 1972–73
- Miller Professor, 1975, 1981
- Alexander von Humboldt Award, 1984
- C. H. Townes Award, Optical Society of America, 1986
- Arthur L. Schawlow Prize in Laser Science, 1992
- Max Planck Research Prize, 1996
- Frank Isakson Prize for Optical Effects in Solids, 1998
- International Science and Technology Cooperation Award, China 2008
- DOE Award for Outstanding Scientific Accomplishments in Solid State Physics, 1983
- DOE Award for Sustained Outstanding Research in Solid State Physics, 1987
- DOE Award for Significant Implications for DOE-Related Technologies, 1997.
