= Philippe Guyot-Sionnest =

Physical-chemistry researcher, academic

Philippe Guyot-Sionnest (born 1961, Nancy, France) is a professor at the University of Chicago appointed jointly in the departments of physics and chemistry. He works in the field of colloidal semiconductors and metal nanocrystals.

He gained a Diplome d'Etude Approfondie in Orsay, France, in 1984 and a PhD at the University of California, Berkeley in 1987. He worked as a Research Scientist at the University of Paris-Sud in Orsay, France from 1988 to 1991, moving to the US in 1991 as Professor in both the Department of Chemistry and the Department of Physics at the University of Chicago, a position he has held since.

His research interest is in the behaviour of nanocrystals of semiconductor materials.

== Awards ==
- 2001 Fellow of the American Physical Society
- 1992 David and Lucile Packard Foundation Fellow.
- 1990 Prix National des Lasers, Société Française de Physique

== Selected publications ==
- Pandey, A.; Guyot-Sionnest, P. (2008-11-07). "Slow Electron Cooling in Colloidal Quantum Dots". Science. 322 (5903). American Association for the Advancement of Science (AAAS): 929–932. Bibcode:2008Sci...322..929P. doi:10.1126/science.1159832. ISSN 0036-8075. PMID 18988849. S2CID 10239476.
- Ithurria, Sandrine; Guyot-Sionnest, Philippe; Mahler, Benoit; Dubertret, Benoit (2007-12-27). "Mn^{2+} as a Radial Pressure Gauge in Colloidal Core/Shell Nanocrystals". Physical Review Letters. 99 (26) 265501. American Physical Society (APS). Bibcode:2007PhRvL..99z5501I. doi:10.1103/physrevlett.99.265501. ISSN 0031-9007. PMID 18233588.
- Yu, Dong; Wang, Congjun; Wehrenberg, Brian L.; Guyot-Sionnest, Philippe (2004-05-25). "Variable Range Hopping Conduction in Semiconductor Nanocrystal Solids". Physical Review Letters. 92 (21) 216802. American Physical Society (APS). arXiv:cond-mat/0403597. Bibcode:2004PhRvL..92u6802Y. doi:10.1103/physrevlett.92.216802. ISSN 0031-9007. PMID 15245304. S2CID 10565090.
- Yu, D. (2003-05-23). "n-Type Conducting CdSe Nanocrystal Solids". Science. 300 (5623). American Association for the Advancement of Science (AAAS): 1277–1280. Bibcode:2003Sci...300.1277Y. doi:10.1126/science.1084424. ISSN 0036-8075. PMID 12764194. S2CID 33819795.
- Wang, C.; Shim, Moonsub; Guyot-Sionnest, Philippe (2001-03-23). "Electrochromic Nanocrystal Quantum Dots". Science. 291 (5512). American Association for the Advancement of Science (AAAS): 2390–2392. Bibcode:2001Sci...291.2390W. doi:10.1126/science.291.5512.2390. ISSN 0036-8075. PMID 11264530.
- Shim, Moonsub; Guyot-Sionnest, Philippe (2000). "n-type colloidal semiconductor nanocrystals". Nature. 407 (6807). Springer Science and Business Media LLC: 981–983. Bibcode:2000Natur.407..981S. doi:10.1038/35039577. ISSN 0028-0836. PMID 11069172. S2CID 4334585.
