= Francine M. Benes =

American neuroscientist and psychiatrist

- Born: May 8, 1946 (age 80); New York City
- Education: Yale School of Medicine; St John's University
- Occupations: Neuroscientist; psychiatrist; university teacher
- Awards: Lieber Prize (2002); William Silen Lifetime Achievement in Mentoring Award (2005); Society of Biological Psychiatry Gold Medal Award (2015)
- Scientific career
- Workplaces: Brain & Behavior Research Foundation; Creedmoor Psychiatric Center; Harvard Medical School

Francine M. Benes (born 8 May 1946) is an American neuroscientist, psychiatrist, and academician whose research on schizophrenia and bipolar disorder have contributed significantly to the field of psychiatry.

Benes was raised in New York City and received her B.A. at St. John's University (New York City) in 1967. She earned both her Ph.D. in Cellular Biology in 1982 and her M.D. in 1978 from Yale University. Throughout her career, Benes received funding from the National Institutes of Health, which allowed her to research the neuronal mechanisms that are unique to patients diagnosed with schizophrenia and/or bipolar disorder. Alongside her research, Benes directed the Structural and Molecular Neuroscience program at McLean Hospital, and served as the director of the Harvard Brain Tissue Resource Center (HBTRC).

== Education ==
As a child, Benes assumed she would grow up to pursue a career in social work or teaching. However, one of her 8th grade teachers wrote a poem about her becoming a scientist, which opened her to the various STEM careers available at the time. Therefore, after receiving her Bachelor's degree from St. John's University in Queens, New York in 1967, Benes continued her education at Yale University where she received her Ph.D. in Cellular Biology in 1972.

While pursuing her Ph.D., Benes would begin publishing research papers that complemented her studies. Her first publication came in 1968, one year after receiving her Bachelor's degree, and focused on the enzymatic activity of tryptophan pyrrolase in mouse models. Additional studies that Benes published while completing her Ph.D. investigated the function of various nervous system structures in animal models. However, there was a noticeable shift in her research interests from cellular biology to psychiatry after graduating with her M.D. in 1978. This shift came after attending the Winter Brain Research Conference in Colorado in the 1970s. Benes told CNN in 2005, that a colleague insisted that there was "nothing there" in reference to the brains of patients diagnosed with schizophrenia. Benes was not satisfied with such conclusions, and was determined to show that something was occurring neurologically within the brains of individuals diagnosed with schizophrenia and similar disorders. This prompted her to pivot from cellular biology, return to school to receive her MD, and complete her residency in psychiatry at McLean Hospital.

== Career ==
=== Research ===
Early in her career, Benes engaged in research on synaptic function and neural plasticity. These studies were conducted in frog and chicken models respectively, as these animals had less complex neural circuits compared to humans. Benes published novel results through these investigations, for example, in 1977 Benes was the first to find that degeneration of primary dendritic branches can occur within 96 hours of deafferentation. Starting her research career with animal models would prepare Benes to investigate more complex neural circuits, such as the human brain.

After completing her residency at McLean Hospital, Benes' research focused on the field of psychiatry, specifically on patients diagnosed with bipolar disorder and schizophrenia. Benes used neuroscience and psychiatry approaches to investigate the differences in brain structure for these patients. Prior to such studies, scholars and physicians believed such mental disorders were due to degenerative declines in brain structures. Benes' research added support to an alternative theory that such disorders, such as schizophrenia and Alzheimer's disease, may instead be the result of disruptions in neural connections.

=== Brain bank ===
The Harvard Brain Tissue Resource Center (HBTRC) was founded by Benes' mentor, Edward D. Bird. After Bird's retirement, Benes directed the program from 1997–2014. During her time as director, Benes expanded the mission and capabilities of the brain repository by updating protocols and procedures, establishing connections with other grass root and private organizations, and transitioned the HBTRC into the NeuroBioBank of the NIH. The last change, which came in 2013, established the HBTRC as a national resource for brain tissue samples and significantly increased the organization's reach in postmortem brain research. Currently, the program is the largest repository of postmortem brain samples that researchers from all over the globe can access and utilize in their studies.

== Recognition ==
- 1998 Invited to present her research at the Nobel Forum, Karolinska Institute, Stockholm Sweden
- 1999: Shervert S. Frazier Lifetime Achievement Award
- 2001: Science Council member
- 2002: Lieber Prize for Outstanding Achievement in Schizophrenia Research
- 2002–2012: National Institutes of Health MERIT Award
- 2004: Election into the Institute of Medicine of the National Academy of Sciences, now the National Academy of Medicine
- 2005: William Silen Lifetime Achievement Excellence in Mentoring, Harvard Medical School DICP
- 2006: Kempf Award for Research Mentoring from the American Psychiatric Association
- 2015: Society of Biological Psychiatry Gold Medal Award

== Selected publications ==
Benes is the author or co-author of over 140 scientific publications. These include:

- Benes, Francine M.; Parks, Thomas N.; Rubel, Edwin W. (1977). "Rapid dendritic atrophy following deafferentation: An EM morphometric analysis". Brain Research. 122 (1): 1–13. doi:10.1016/0006-8993(77)90658-8. PMID 837214.
- Benes, Francine M.; Barrnett, Russell J. (1978). "Biochemical and morphometric studies of the relationship of acetylcholine synthesis and vesicle numbers after stimulation of frog neuromuscular junctions: The effect of acholine-O-acetyltransferase inhibitor". Brain Research. 150 (2): 277–293. doi:10.1016/0006-8993(78)90280-9. PMID 307974.
- Benes, F. M. (January 1, 1989). "Myelination of Cortical-hippocampal Relays During Late Adolescence" (PDF). Schizophrenia Bulletin. 15 (4): 585–593. doi:10.1093/schbul/15.4.585. ISSN 0586-7614. PMID 2623440.
- Benes, Francine M. (November 1, 1991). "Deficits in Small Interneurons in Prefrontal and Cingulate Cortices of Schizophrenic and Schizoaffective Patients". Archives of General Psychiatry. 48 (11): 996–1001. doi:10.1001/archpsyc.1991.01810350036005. ISSN 0003-990X. PMID 1747023.
- Benes, Francine M. (June 1, 1994). "Myelination of a Key Relay Zone in the Hippocampal Formation Occurs in the Human Brain During Childhood, Adolescence, and Adulthood". Archives of General Psychiatry. 51 (6): 477–484. doi:10.1001/archpsyc.1994.03950060041004. ISSN 0003-990X. PMID 8192550.
- Benes, Francine M; Kwok, Esther W; Vincent, Stephen L; Todtenkopf, Mark S (1998). "A reduction of nonpyramidal cells in sector CA2 of schizophrenics and manic depressives". Biological Psychiatry. 44 (2): 88–97. doi:10.1016/S0006-3223(98)00138-3. PMID 9646890.
- Benes, F (2000). "Emerging principles of altered neural circuitry in schizophrenia". Brain Research Reviews. 31 (2–3): 251–269. doi:10.1016/S0165-0173(99)00041-7. PMID 10719152.
- Benes, F (2001). "GABAergic Interneurons Implications for Understanding Schizophrenia and Bipolar Disorder" (PDF). Neuropsychopharmacology. 25 (1): 1–27. doi:10.1016/S0893-133X(01)00225-1. PMID 11377916.
- Benes, Francine M.; Lim, Benjamin; Matzilevich, David; Walsh, John P.; et al. (June 12, 2007). "Regulation of the GABA cell phenotype in hippocampus of schizophrenics and bipolars". Proceedings of the National Academy of Sciences. 104 (24): 10164–10169. Bibcode:2007PNAS..10410164B. doi:10.1073/pnas.0703806104. ISSN 0027-8424. PMC 1888575. PMID 17553960.
- Benes, Francine M (2010). "Amygdalocortical Circuitry in Schizophrenia: From Circuits to Molecules" (PDF). Neuropsychopharmacology. 35 (1): 239–257. doi:10.1038/npp.2009.116. ISSN 0893-133X. PMC 3055447. PMID 19727065.
