= Terry Earl Robinson =

Biopsychologist and neuroscientist

- Occupations: Biopsychologist and neuroscientist

Academic background
- Education: BA., Psychology (1972); MA., Biopsychology (1974); PhD., Biopsychology (1978)
- Alma mater: University of Lethbridge; University of Saskatchewan; University of Western Ontario
- Thesis: Brainstem Influences On Hippocampal And Neocortical Slow Wave Activation During Waking Behavior And Sleep (1978)

Academic work
- Institutions: The University of Michigan (Ann Arbor)

Terry Earl Robinson is a biopsychologist and neuroscientist, and the Elliot S. Valenstein Distinguished University Professor Emeritus of Psychology & Neuroscience at The University of Michigan (Ann Arbor).

Robinson is most known for his research on the persistent psychological and neurobiological effects of repeated drug use, and how these may contribute to addiction and relapse. From 2010 onwards, his research has focused on how individual differences in attributing incentive salience to reward-associated cues may contribute to impulse-control disorders like addiction. He has published over 260 articles, edited two books and was listed on ISI HighlyCited.com as one of the highest cited (top 0.5%) scientists in Neuroscience. His papers have been cited over 62,000 times and his h-Index is 110. He is the recipient of APA's D.O Hebb Distinguished Scientific Contribution Award, Distinguished Scientific Contributions Award, and Neal Miller Lecturer, EBPS' Distinguished Scientist Award, APS' William James Fellow Award for Lifetime Achievement, and Grawemeyer Award for Outstanding Ideas in Psychology. He has also received The Henry Russel Lectureship, which is the U-M's highest honor for senior faculty, an Honorary Doctor of Science (honoris causa) degree from the University of Lethbridge, Canada, and was listed on the Stanford University Names World's Top 2% Scientists in 2021.

Robinson is a Fellow of the American Association for the Advancement of Science (AAAS), a Charter Fellow of the American Psychological Society (APS), and a Fellow of Eastern Psychological Association. He was President of the European Behavioral Pharmacology Society (EBPS) from 2015 to 2017. In 2003, he served as chair for the Gordon Research Conference on Catecholamines at The Queen's College, Oxford. He has participated in multiple NIH grant review panels, and held a NIH Research Career Development, NIDA Senior Scientist, and NIDA-funded MERIT Award. In addition, he was the Editor-in-Chief of the journal, Behavioural Brain Research, from 1996 until 2010.

== Education ==
Robinson earned a B.A. in psychology from the University of Lethbridge in 1972, followed by an M.A. in the same field from the University of Saskatchewan in 1974. Subsequently, he obtained a Ph.D. in Biopsychology from the University of Western Ontario in 1978, and received postdoctoral training with Gary Lynch at the University of California, Irvine in the same year.

== Career ==
Robinson completed his Ph.D. research under the mentorship of C.H. Vanderwolf at the University of Western Ontario in 1978. He joined the University of Michigan as an assistant professor of psychology in 1978. In 2001, he was appointed the Elliot S. Valenstein Collegiate Professor of Behavioral Neuroscience, and, since his retirement in December 2024, has been the Elliot S. Valenstein Distinguished University Professor Emeritus of Psychology & Neuroscience at the University of Michigan, Ann Arbor.

== Research ==
Robinson has maintained a research program focusing on the psychological and neurobiological basis of addiction, especially the persistent effects of repeated psychostimulant drug use on behavior and neurobiology, and with his colleague Kent C. Berridge he has also contributed highly cited theoretical articles on the role of incentive-sensitization in addiction.

=== Studies on behavioral sensitization ===
In the early 1980s, Robinson initiated studies using the amphetamine-induced rotational behavior model to explore the mesostriatal dopamine system's function and the influence of sex and gonadal hormones with Jill Becker. These studies revealed behavioral sensitization, where a single amphetamine injection increased subsequent behavioral responses, indicating drug-induced brain changes. He then launched a long series of studies in the 1980s and 1990s to characterize the behavioral and neurobiological basis of sensitization, initially emphasizing it as a model of amphetamine psychosis. These studies include the first reports of sex differences and gonadal steroid modulation of sensitization, enhanced amphetamine-stimulated dopamine release in vitro (1982), and in vivo (1988), sensitization to cocaine after a single injection (1985), cross-sensitization with stress (1985), and its persistence, lasting over a year post-drug treatment (1991).

=== The incentive-sensitization theory of addiction, and the role of dopamine in reward ===
In the 1980s, dopamine was believed to mediate the pleasure derived from reward consumption. However, in 1989, Kent Berridge, along with Robinson, reported that complete dopamine depletions had no effect on rats' hedonic reactions to tastes, leading to the hypothesis that dopamine mediates motivation ('wanting') rather than pleasure ('liking'). Building on this, they proposed that addiction may result from neural sensitization, causing pathological 'wanting' for drugs, even if not particularly 'liked'. This concept gave rise to incentive-sensitization theory (1993), influencing subsequent research on the role of incentive motivational processes in addiction. This paper ranked 15th among the 100 most cited articles in Neuroscience and was listed as the single most cited paper in addiction research in 2021. Their papers, are cited widely, and earned them the Grawemeyer Award in Psychology in 2019.

=== Studies on the modulation of sensitization by environmental and pharmacokinetic factors ===
Continuing studies on behavioral and neural sensitization, Robinson, with Aldo Badiani, observed that environmental factors significantly influenced both the induction and expression of sensitization. Animals tested in a novel drug context often failed to express behavioral sensitization, termed context-specific sensitization. Simultaneously, the drug's context played a crucial role in sensitization induction, leading to research from 1996 to the mid-2000s on how context modulates the behavioral and neurobiological consequences of stimulant or opiate exposure, affecting dopamine neurotransmission and gene expression. Additionally, in 2002, it was discovered that the speed of drug delivery to the brain greatly influences sensitization induction. These findings led to the hypothesis that rapidly reaching the brain enhances addiction potential by promoting sensitization-related neuroplasticity.

=== Studies on structural plasticity associated with exposure to drugs of abuse ===
Collaborating with Bryan Kolb, Robinson hypothesized that long-lasting behavioral effects of drug exposure involve changes in synaptic connectivity, which would be reflected by changes in dendritic structure. In the late 1990s, they published the first paper on structural plasticity after amphetamine administration in 1997, followed by studies on cocaine and morphine in 1999. They also established patterns of changes in brain regions (e.g., dorsal vs. ventral striatum, prefrontal cortical subregions, other areas of the neocortex), their similarity after experimenter- or self-administered drugs (2002), and the impact of past experience (2003), and context (2004), along with other features.

=== Studies on individual differences in responding to reward cues and the role of pharmacokinetics in addiction development ===
Robinson has focused on individual differences in the extent to which reward cues, including drug cues, acquire motivational value (incentive salience). Initial studies, with Shelly Flagel, showed that only some animals (sign-trackers) attribute incentive salience to reward cues, which makes them attention-grabbing and desirable in their own right. It is established that only if reward cues act as incentive stimuli do they come to attract, incite, provoke, spur, and motivate, leading to potentially maladaptive behavior. Notably, sign-tracking is dopamine-dependent whereas goal-tracking, which is observed in animals that fail to attribute motivational value to cues, is not dopamine-dependent. Furthermore, Martin Sarter and colleagues have shown that sign-trackers have deficient choline transporters leading to poor executive/attentional control over behavior, relative to goal-trackers. Robinson has speculated that the combination of enhanced "bottom-up" motivational processes and poor "top-down" inhibitory control may render sign-trackers especially prone to addiction.

Finally, Robinson has initiated an investigation into the impact of pharmacokinetic factors on the emergence of addiction-like behavior, using the Intermittent Access (IntA) self-administration procedure. Their findings have demonstrated IntA cocaine self-administration is especially effective in inducing addiction-like behavior, psychomotor, incentive, and dopamine sensitization, consistent with Incentive-Sensitization Theory.

== Awards and honors ==
- 1988 – Fellow, American Association for the Advancement of Science (AAAS)
- 1989 – Charter Fellow, The American Psychological Society
- 2010 – D.O Hebb Distinguished Scientific Contribution Award, American Psychological Association
- 2011 – Fellow, Eastern Psychological Association
- 2013 – Distinguished Scientist Award, European Behavioral Pharmacology Society
- 2014 – William James Fellow Award for Lifetime Achievement, Association for Psychological Science
- 2015 – Neal Miller Lecturer, American Psychological Association
- 2016 – Distinguished Scientific Contributions Award, American Psychological Association
- 2016 – Honorary Doctor of Science Degree, University of Lethbridge
- 2018 – Henry Russel Lectureship, University of Michigan
- 2019 – Grawemeyer Award for Outstanding Ideas in Psychology, University of Louisville

== Bibliography ==
=== Edited books ===
- Behavioral Approaches to Brain Research (1983) ISBN 9780195032581
- Microdialysis in the Neurosciences (1991) ISBN 9780444811943

=== Selected articles ===
- Robinson, T. E., & Becker, J. B. (1986). Enduring changes in brain and behavior produced by chronic amphetamine administration: a review and evaluation of animal models of amphetamine psychosis. Brain research reviews, 11(2), 157–198.
- Robinson, T. E., & Berridge, K. C. (1993). The neural basis of drug craving: an incentive-sensitization theory of addiction. Brain research reviews, 18(3), 247–291.
- Berridge, K. C., & Robinson, T. E. (1998). What is the role of dopamine in reward: hedonic impact, reward learning, or incentive salience?. Brain research reviews, 28(3), 309–369.
- Berridge, K. C., & Robinson, T. E. (2003). Parsing reward. Trends in neurosciences, 26(9), 507–513.
- Robinson, T. E., & Berridge, K. C. (2008). The incentive sensitization theory of addiction: some current issues. Philosophical Transactions of the Royal Society B: Biological Sciences, 363(1507), 3137–3146.
