= Sarnat Prize =

American award for improving mental health science and services

The Rhoda and Bernard Sarnat International Prize in Mental Health was established in 1992 and is awarded annually by the National Academy of Medicine in the United States to recognize individuals, groups, or organizations for outstanding achievement in improving mental health. It is accompanied by a medal and $20,000.

== Recipients ==
- 1992: Daniel X. Freedman, University of California, Los Angeles, School of Medicine
- 1993: Seymour S. Kety, Harvard Medical School
- 1994: Myrna Weissman, Columbia University College of Physicians and Surgeons and Gerald Klerman, Cornell University Medical College
- 1995: Samuel B. Guze, Barnes and Renard Hospital
- 1996: Leon Eisenberg, Harvard Medical School
- 1997: Herbert Pardes, Columbia University College of Physicians and Surgeons
- 1998: David Kupfer, University of Pittsburgh Medical Centre
- 1999: Nancy C. Andreasen, University of Iowa Hospitals and Clinics
- 2000: Rosalynn Carter, The Carter Centre
- 2001: Michael L. Rutter, King's College London and Solomon H. Snyder, Johns Hopkins University School of Medicine
- 2002: David Satcher, Morehouse School of Medicine
- 2003: Aaron T. Beck, University of Pennsylvania
- 2004: Albert J. Stunkard, University of Pennsylvania
- 2005: Floyd E. Bloom, Neurome, Inc
- 2006: Jack D. Barchas, Weill Cornell Medical College
- 2007: Beatrix Hamburg and David Hamburg, Weill Cornell Medical College
- 2008: Paul R. McHugh, Johns Hopkins Bloomberg School of Public Health
- 2009: David Mechanic, Institute for Health, Health Care Policy, and Aging Research/Rutgers University
- 2010: Eric J. Nestler, Friedman Brain Institute/Mount Sinai School of Medicine and Charles P. O'Brien, University of Pennsylvania School of Medicine
- 2011: William E. Bunney, University of California, Irvine, School of Medicine
- 2012: Huda Akil and Stanley J. Watson, University of Michigan, Ann Arbor
- 2013: William T. Carpenter, University of Maryland School of Medicine
- 2014: Vikram Patel, London School of Hygiene and Tropical Medicine
- 2015: Kay Redfield Jamison, Johns Hopkins University School of Medicine and Kenneth S. Kendler, Virginia Institute for Psychiatric and Behavioral Genetics
- 2016: Steven Hyman, Stanley Institute and Robin Murray, King's College, London
- 2017: Joseph T. Coyle, Harvard Medical School and McLean Hospital, Catherine Lord, Weill Cornell Medical College and Matthew State, University of California, San Francisco
- 2018: Kenneth B. Wells, UCLA David Geffen School of Medicine
- 2019: Daniel Weinberger, Lieber Institute for Brain Development
- 2020: Stephen P. Hinshaw, University of California, Berkeley and University of California, San Francisco
- 2021: Spero Manson, University of Colorado
- 2022: Daniel Geschwind, University of California, Los Angeles

== See also ==
- List of medicine awards
- List of prizes named after people
