= Flagel =

Flagel is a French surname. Notable people with the surname include:

- Claude Flagel (1932–2020), French musician
- Scott Flagel (born 1961), Canadian football player
- Shelly Flagel, American behavioral neuroscientist
