= LIBD =

LIBD may refer to:

- Lieber Institute for Brain Development, a nonprofit research center located in Baltimore, Maryland
- LIBD, the ICAO code for Bari Karol Wojtyła Airport, Bari, Italy
