= Learning to Live Together =

Book by David A. Hamburg and Beatrix Hamburg

Learning to Live Together: Preventing Hatred and Violence in Child and Adolescent Development is a book written by David A. Hamburg and Beatrix Hamburg that examines the psychological aspects of how that societies teach prejudice to children and adolescents, and suggests educational strategies to prevent hatred and violence.
