= Jan Bureš =

Czech neurophysiologist

- Born: 13 June 1926; Čtyři Dvory, Czechoslovakia
- Died: 24 August 2012 (aged 86); Prague, Czech Republic
- Resting place: Podolí Cemetery in Prague
- Citizenship: Czech
- Education: Charles University
- Known for: memory research
- Partner: Olga Burešová
- Children: Olga Štěpánková
- Awards: 1992 – Doctor honoris causa, University of Lethbridge, Canada 1995 – Member, US National Academy of Sciences 2000 – Member, Polish Academy of Sciences
- Scientific career
- Fields: neurophysiology, electrophysiology
- Workplaces: Czech Academy of Sciences
- Notable students: André Fenton, Lynn Nadel, Ian Q. Whishaw

Jan Bureš (13 June 1926 – 24 August 2012) was a Czech neurophysiologist and electrophysiologist. He was an expert on memory and other neurological phenomena. He is recipient of many Czech and foreign awards and is a foreign associate of the US National Academy of Sciences. He is the most cited Czech scientist in the field of neuroscience.

== Biography ==
Jan Bureš was born on 13 June 1926 in Čtyři Dvory (today integral part of České Budějovice).

He applied to the 1st Medical Faculty of the Charles University in Prague. However, he did not want to devote himself to clinical practice, but to research. During his studies, he married fellow student Olga Komorádová, who was two years older, and in 1949 they had a daughter, Olga, who later became an important expert in the field of cybernetics. After finishing his studies in 1950, he stayed in Prague and joined the laboratory of Prof. Zdeněk Servít at the Czech Academy of Sciences, where he started his scientific career. He subsequently spent his entire working life in this institution. Already in the 1960s, he became one of the most respected workers there. He went to many conferences around the world, stayed in the Soviet Union and the United States.

In the 1970s, he had political problems with the communist regime in Czechoslovakia. Subsequently, he was only allowed to work at the institute on the basis of one- to two-year contracts, which were always extended at the last minute, he traveled abroad to a minimum and was strictly supervised. His closest and most important scientific collaborator was his wife Olga, who was the co-author of a considerable number of his publications. At this time, however, he was allowed to accept a large number of foreign interns who traveled specially to see him in Czechoslovakia, and thus he educated a relatively large number of young neuroscientists from all corners of the world (over 100 interns from 27 countries) - both Western and Eastern. Many of them became well-known neuroscientists (e. g. André Fenton, Lynn Nadel, Ian Q. Whishaw). In addition, he also published extensively in scientific journals.

After the Velvet Revolution, he again rose to the position of one of the most respected Czech scientists, which was confirmed by the large number of distinguished awards he received; he was also a member of many professional organizations and associations. He remained scientifically active until his 80s.

Toward the end of his life, he developed Alzheimer's disease and his health rapidly deteriorated. He lived in the care of his family and died on 24 August 2012 in Prague at the age of 86. After his death, a number of obituaries followed, celebrating his contribution to science and calling him one of the founding fathers of modern neuroscience.

== Scientific work ==
Jan Bureš' work dealt mainly with the issues of spreading cortical depression, reflex epilepsy, conditioned taste aversion and spatial memory. One of the most important book publications in which he participated with his colleagues was Electrophysiological Methods in Biological Research. First published in 1960, this book has been regarded as a reference by many electrophysiologists worldwide and has seen several reprints. He also contributed to more than three hundred books and articles, and is the most cited Czech neuroscientist with a D-Index of 62 (assessment within a specific discipline) and more than 11,000 citations.

== Awards and comments ==
- In 1992, he was awarded an honorary doctorate at the Canadian University of Lethbridge.
- In 1995, he was elected a foreign associate of the US National Academy of Sciences. He was the first Czech to achieve this honour and, until 2015, the only.
- In 2000, he was elected a foreign member of the Polish Academy of Sciences.
- In 2001, the Czech Academy of Sciences awarded him the Jan Evangelista Purkyně Medal of Honor for his merits in biomedical sciences.
- In 2003, he was also appointed honorary chairman of the IBRO (International Brain Research Organization) world neuroscience congress, which took place in Prague.

The Dr. Jan Bureš Award is awarded every year in the Czech Republic for research into Alzheimer's disease.

Every year, the Institute of Physiology of the Czech Academy of Sciences organizes a series of lectures by world-renowned scientific personalities from the field under the name Bureš lectures.

== Gallery ==
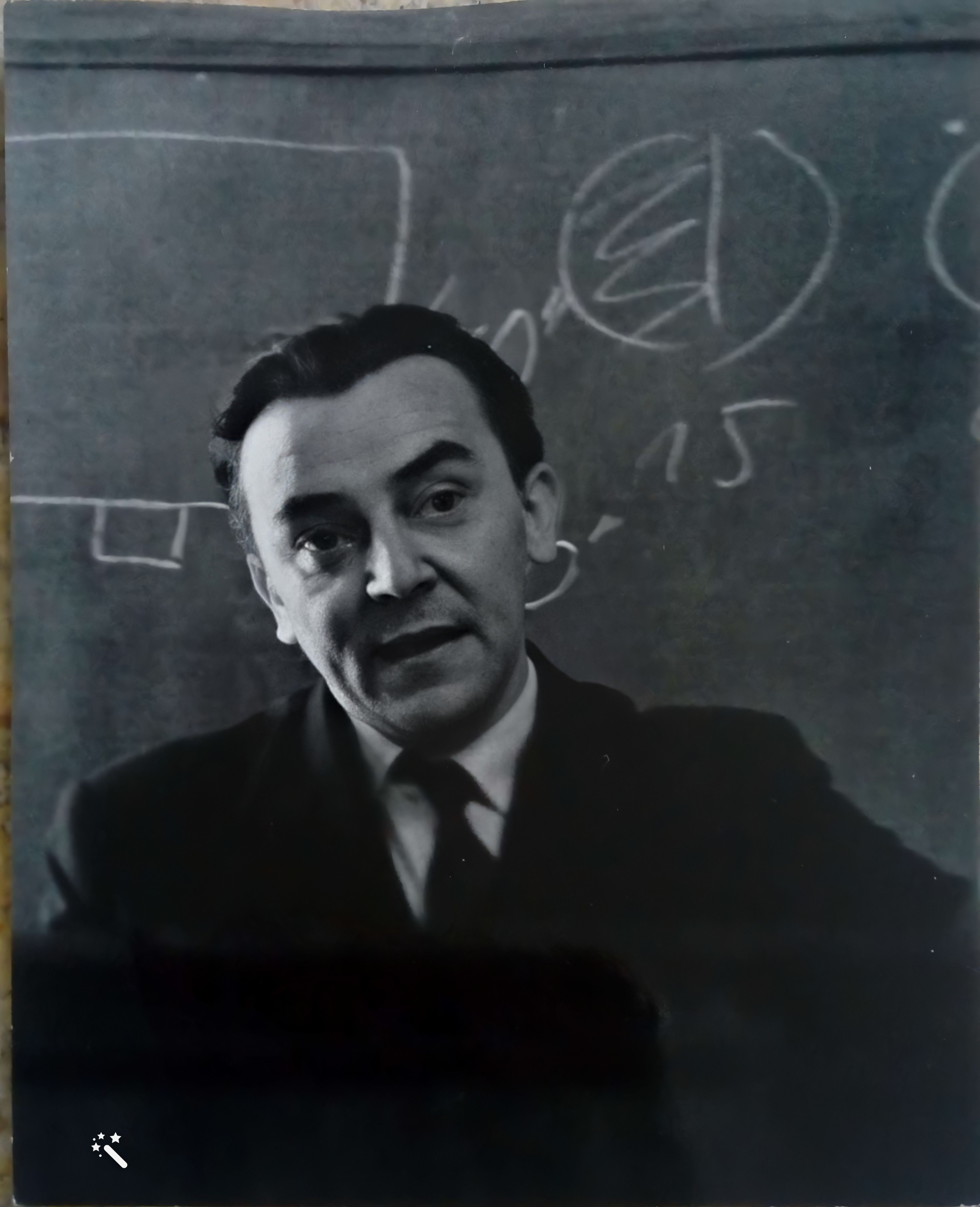

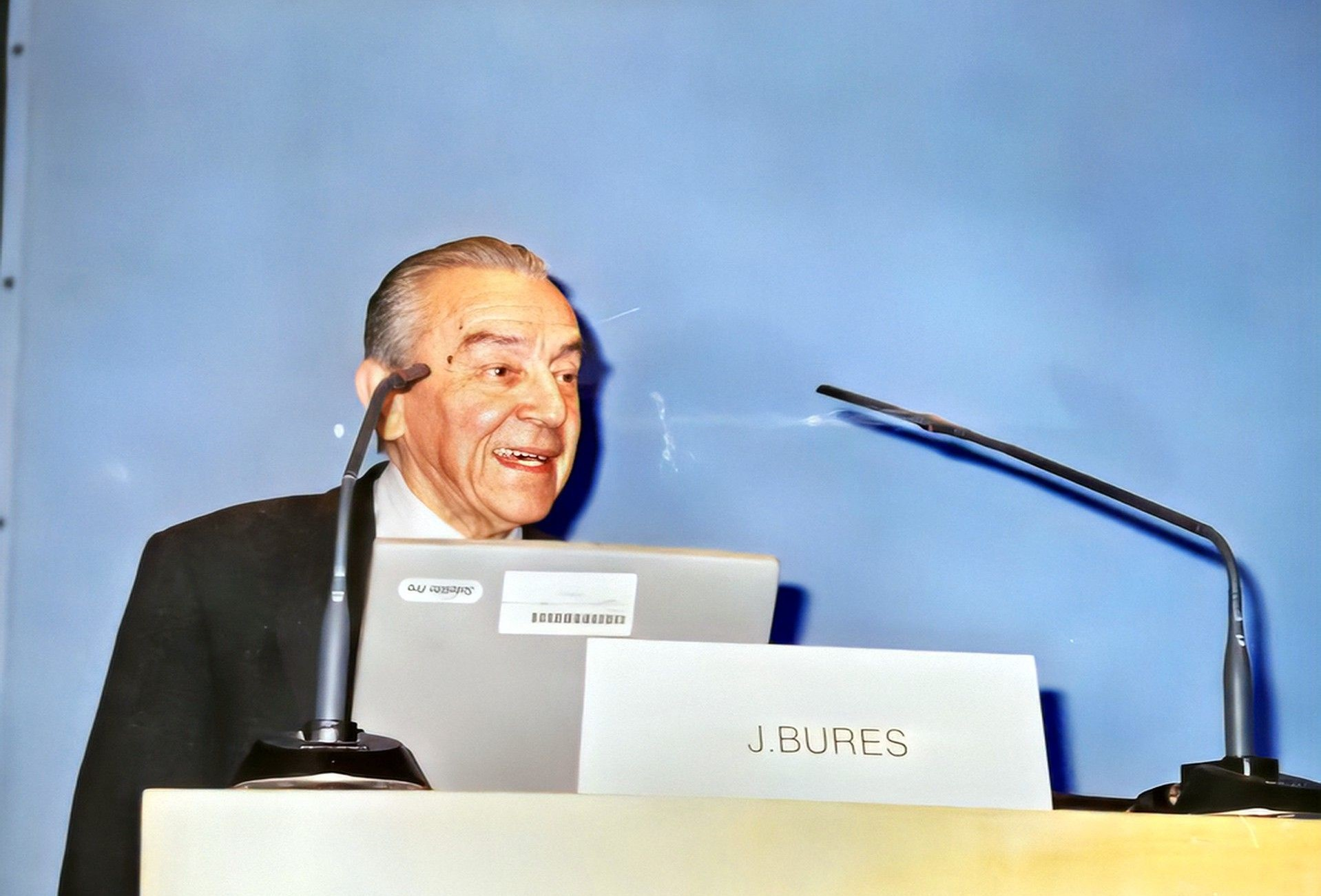
