= Kate Jeffery =

New Zealand neuroscientist (born 1962)

Kate J. Jeffery
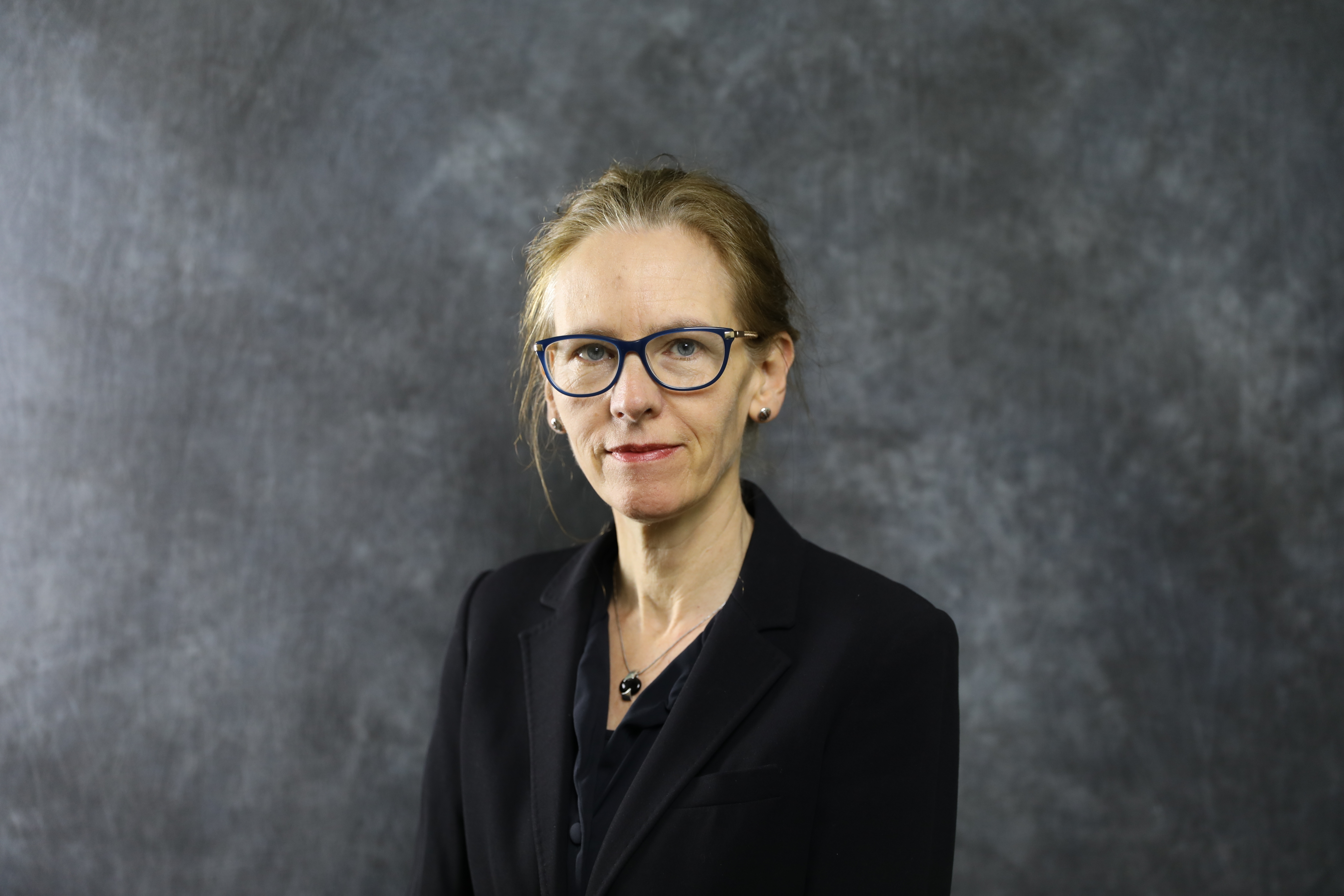
- Jefferey in 2018
- Born: 5 March 1962 (age 64)
- Education: University of Otago, University of Edinburgh
- Spouse: Jim Donnett
- Scientific career
- Workplaces: University College London, University of Glasgow
- Academic advisors: Richard Morris, John O'Keefe

Kathryn Jane Jeffery (born 5 March 1962) is a neuroscientist from New Zealand. She is a professor of behavioural neuroscience at University of Glasgow. She studies how the brain encodes three-dimensional and complex space, and the role of this representation in spatial cognition and navigation.

== Early life and career ==
Jeffery grew up in Dunedin, New Zealand, the daughter of an orthopaedic surgeon and operating theatre nurse. She went to St Hilda's Collegiate School for girls and then attended Otago University Medical School, spending clinical training years in Christchurch. She met Jim Donnett during her time in Edinburgh. They moved to London together when she began her postdoctoral work. They were married in 1993 and later had three daughters, in 1994, 1997 and 2002.

Jeffery graduated with a degree of MB ChB from the University of Otago in 1985. After working as a house officer, she returned to the University of Otago to complete a master's degree in 1989 under the supervision of Cliff Abraham. She completed her PhD at the University of Edinburgh in 1993 under the supervision of Richard Morris. She went on to work as a postdoctoral researcher with John O'Keefe, who won the 2014 Nobel Prize for his work on place cells, at University College London. Jeffery correctly predicted he would win the Nobel Prize in a tweet. During this time she met May-Britt Moser and Edvard Moser who visited the lab for several months. Donnett sold them a newly designed recording system, this being the first sale from the company Axona Ltd he founded with Jeffery and which they still direct. This recording system later became the one with which the Mosers discovered grid cells, and now resides in the Nobel Prize Museum in Stockholm.

Jeffery stayed at University College London to become a lecturer and later a professor. Here, she founded the Institute of Behavioural Neuroscience, of which she was also director. From 2010 to 2013 she was head of department for Experimental Psychology (which back then was called Cognitive, Perceptual and Brain Sciences). From 2021 to 2022 she was Vice Dean (Research) for the Faculty of Brain Sciences. In September 2022 she moved to the University of Glasgow to head the newly formed School of Psychology & Neuroscience.

== Research ==
Jeffery is particularly interested in the representation of 3D space within the hippocampal system in our brain. The hippocampus contains place cells, discovered by O’Keefe in 1971, and her work has focused on the question of how a place cell “knows” when to become active. A long running thread has been how the brain integrates static information from environmental landmarks and dynamic information arising from movement through space. Her lab was the first lab after the Moser to discovery to publish work on grid cells, showing that these neurons also integrate learned static environmental information with their self-motion signals. More recent work has addressed the issue of whether the internal map extends upwards as well as across horizontal space (in other words, whether it is three-dimensional). Jeffery's original proposal in 2011 was that the map is essentially “flat” (2-D), with relatively little sensitivity to upwards movement, but more recent work has modulated that view as it seems that in some types of environment the place-cell map can be 3-D.

A second interest has been in how the brain uses “context” to help determine which environment the animal is in. Jeffery also studies head direction cells which are cells in the brain that represent the direction an animal is facing. In 2017 her lab discovered a new type of neuron in retrosplenial cortex that links viewing scene and facing direction.

== Science and art ==
Jeffery has been involved in a number of projects linking neuroscience and art. She collaborated on the piece Spin Glass with Jenny Walsh and Jeremy Keenan, which represents the head direction network in the brain of an animal. She consulted on the Off-Broadway play The Nature of Forgetting, about how the brain represents memory.

Jeffery is also interested in the link between architecture and the representation of location in the brain. She presented at the Conscious Cities conferences on how the design of environments affects the sense of direction and at the Academy of Neuroscience for Architecture (ANFA) and has written on the subject with an article and a book chapter.

== Honours ==
Jeffery is a Fellow of the Royal Society of Biology and Fellow of the Royal Institute of Navigation. She a former vice-president for the Royal Institute of Navigation.

== Selected publications ==
- Casali, Giulio; Bush, Daniel; Jeffery, Kate (5 March 2019). "Altered neural odometry in the vertical dimension". Proceedings of the National Academy of Sciences. 116 (10): 4631–4636. Bibcode:2019PNAS..116.4631C. doi:10.1073/pnas.1811867116. ISSN 0027-8424. PMC 6410878. PMID 30770450.
- Hayman, Robin; Verriotis, Madeleine A.; Jovalekic, Aleksandar; Fenton, André A.; Jeffery, Kathryn J. (2011). "Anisotropic encoding of three-dimensional space by place cells and grid cells". Nature Neuroscience. 14 (9): 1182–1188. doi:10.1038/nn.2892. ISSN 1546-1726. PMC 3166852. PMID 21822271.
- Barry, Caswell; Hayman, Robin; Burgess, Neil; Jeffery, Kathryn J. (2007). "Experience-dependent rescaling of entorhinal grids". Nature Neuroscience. 10 (6): 682–684. doi:10.1038/nn1905. ISSN 1546-1726. PMID 17486102. S2CID 12688543.
- Anderson, Michael I.; Jeffery, Kathryn J. (1 October 2003). "Heterogeneous Modulation of Place Cell Firing by Changes in Context". Journal of Neuroscience. 23 (26): 8827–8835. doi:10.1523/JNEUROSCI.23-26-08827.2003. ISSN 0270-6474. PMC 6740394. PMID 14523083.
