= Whishaw =

Whishaw is a surname. Notable people with the surname include:

- Anthony Whishaw (born 1930), English artist
- Ben Whishaw (born 1980), English actor
- Francis Whishaw (1804–1856), English civil engineer
- Fred Whishaw (1854–1934), Russian-born British writer
- Ian Q. Whishaw (born 1939), Canadian neuropsychologist
- John Whishaw (1764–1840), English lawyer
- Stella Zoe Whishaw, original name of Stella Arbenina (1884–1976), Russian-born English actress

== See also ==
- Wishaw
