= Daniel Weinberger =

American scientist and professor

Daniel R. Weinberger M.D.
- Education: University of Pennsylvania
- Awards: K.J. Zulch Neuroscience Prize; NIH Mider Lecture
- Scientific career
- Fields: Developmental Neuroscience, Neurology, Psychiatry
- Workplaces: Lieber Institute for Brain Development; Johns Hopkins University

Daniel R. Weinberger (born 1947) is a professor of psychiatry, neurology and neuroscience at Johns Hopkins University and Director and CEO of the Lieber Institute for Brain Development, which opened in 2011.

== Life ==
He is an alumnus of the University of Pennsylvania Medical School and completed two residencies, one in psychiatry at Harvard Medical School and another in neurology at George Washington University.

In 1987, he transitioned from an NIMH research fellow under Richard Wyatt to Chief of the Clinical Brain Disorders Branch. In 1995, Weinberger became a clinical professor of psychiatry and behavioral sciences at George Washington University. In 2011, Weinberger became the CEO of the Lieber Institute for Brain Development in Baltimore, Maryland. In 2012, Weinberger became a professor of psychiatry, neurology and neuroscience at the McKusick-Nathans Institute of Genetic Medicine, and the Johns Hopkins University.

== Work ==
Weinberger is most known for his work on identifying genetic factors and biochemical mechanisms in mental illness, and promoting research in these areas to further explain causes behind disorders such as schizophrenia. He is the original author of the landmark neurodevelopmental hypothesis of schizophrenia (first published in The Neurology of Schizophrenia, Elsevier, 1986) and in the more cited reference, Arch Gen Psychiatry 1987, (the most cited publication [>4100 citations] about the biology of schizophrenia in Google Scholar). In a later paper, he analyzed the activity of the gene Neuregulin-1 in a large collection of brain samples from schizophrenic patients and found that the regulation of the gene contributes to schizophrenia.

In a review in Neuron, Weinberger wrote that individuals of African ancestry must be included in research for brain illnesses.

He has published over 800 papers in peer-reviewed journals, and has written for The Hill and The New York Times. He maintains columns on mental health at the Huffington Post, Medium, and The Conversation.

== Honors and awards ==
2019: Rhoda and Bernard Sarnat International Prize in Mental Health from the National Academy of Medicine
