= Richard L. Meier =

American regional planner and systems theorist (1920–2007)

Richard Louis Meier (May 16, 1920 – February 26, 2007) was an American regional planner, systems theorist, scientist, urban scholar, and futurist, as well as a Professor in the College of Environmental Design at the University of California at Berkeley. He was an early thinker on sustainability in planning, and recognized as a leading figure in city planning and development. He is not related to the New York-based architect Richard Meier, whom he was often confused with.

== Life and career ==
Born in Kendallville, Indiana on May 16, 1920, Meier grew up as the oldest of five children in a family of modest means. His father was a German-American Lutheran schoolteacher, choirmaster, and organist. His mother became seriously ill shortly after the birth of her youngest child, and a lot of responsibility of running the household fell onto young Meier. He earned a bachelor's degree in chemistry from the University of Illinois at Urbana-Champaign in 1940, and a master's and a doctorate in organic chemistry from UCLA. Meier earned his Ph.D. in organic chemistry at the University of California, Los Angeles (UCLA) in 1944.

During World War II, Meier worked as a Standard Oil research chemist in Richmond, California. Even before taking his Ph.D. in organic chemistry at University of California at Los Angeles in 1944, Meier made his mark as a generalist and futurist, persuading the newly established department to teach leading-edge developments in nuclear chemistry and physics. Meier began talking with Berkeley scientists about the post-war implications of atomic energy and weapons. He founded along with his colleagues, what is now called, the Federation of American Scientists, a non-profit organization focused on consolidating scientific knowledge to aid national interests.

During a Fulbright Fellowship in Manchester, England, in 1949–50, Meier shifted his attention to technological solutions for the problems of the world's biggest and poorest cities. As early as 1951, he convinced a University of Chicago colleague, the New Deal "brain-truster" Rexford Tugwell, of the inevitability of Meier's forecasts. These included a long list of developments, among them the radical improvement of communications using ultra fax and television devices, more effective antibiotics, and "advances toward technological oneness in the world ... followed by tighter organization and by holistic planning devices," Tugwell said.

Between 1950 and 1956, he taught in the University of Chicago's influential Program of Education and Research in Planning. End 1950s he was among the first members of the Society for General Systems Research. Between 1957 and 1967, he first was a research social scientist in the Mental Health Research Institute at the University of Michigan, focusing on systems theory. At Michigan, Meier and Kenneth Boulding were colleagues, they bounced ideas off each other, and Meier had enormous respect for him. Later he became professor in Michigan's School of Natural Resources, Department of Conservation. Meier moved to the University of California, Berkeley in 1967, and helped establish the new doctoral program in the Department of City and Regional Planning (DCRP). For more than 35 years, he was a faculty member in the Departments of Architecture, Landscape Architecture, and City and Regional Planning in the College of Environmental Design at the University of California, Berkeley.

In retirement, Meier continued teaching, writing, and generating new ideas, despite increasing disabilities. His final book "Ecological Planning, Management and Design" published online in 2003, laid out many of his strategies for creating sustainable communities, particularly for the urban poor in developing countries. It reflected his unquenchable optimism about the future and his belief that good planning and social justice are inseparable.

== Publications ==
- 1956. Science and economic development; new patterns of living. Cambridge, Massachusetts, M. I. T. Press.
- 1959. Modern science and the human fertility problem. New York, Wiley
- 1962. A communications theory of urban growth. M.I.T. Press
- 1962. Croissance urbaine et théorie des communications. Paris, Presses universitaires de France.
- 1965. Developmental planning. New York, McGraw-Hill.
- 1967. The influence of resource constraints upon planning for worldwide economic development. Athens, Athens Technological Organization, Athens Center of Ekistics, 1967.
- 1974. Planning for an urban world: the design of resource-conserving cities. Cambridge, Massachusetts, MIT Press.
- 1978. Risk-taking considered in a community ecology framework. Berkeley : Institute of Urban & Regional Development, University of California.
- 1978. The new paradigm for planners--:community ecology. Berkeley : Institute of Urban & Regional Development, University of California, 1978.
- 1981. Energizing urban ecosystems in the Philippines, Manila. Berkeley, Calif. : Institute of Urban and Regional Development, University of California
- 1989. Life alongside a revolution : a Hong Kong diary, June 1989. Berkeley, Calif.: Institute of Urban & Regional Development, University of California at Berkeley.
- 2003. Ecological Planning, Management and Design. Online manuscript of his final work at berkeley.edu.
