= Beatrix Hamburg =

American physician

Beatrix Ann Hamburg (née McCleary; October 19, 1923 – April 15, 2018) was an American psychiatrist whose career in academic medicine advanced the field of child and adolescent psychiatry. Hamburg was the first known African-American to attend Vassar College, and was also the first African-American woman to attend Yale Medical School. Hamburg held professorships at Stanford, Harvard, Mt. Sinai and Weill Cornell Medical College. She was on the President's Commission on Mental Health under President Jimmy Carter. Hamburg was a president of the William T. Grant Foundation, and also directed the child psychiatry divisions at Stanford University and Mount Sinai. She originally was going to go into pediatric medicine, but instead found herself interested in psychiatry. She researched early adolescence, peer counseling, and diabetic children and adolescents. She was a member of the National Academy of Medicine and a fellow of the American Association for the Advancement of Science. She received a Foremother Award for her lifetime of accomplishments from the National Research Center for Women & Families in 2012.

== Early life ==
Beatrix Ann McCleary was born to Minor McCleary and Beatrix Ann Downs on October 19, 1923, in Jacksonville, Florida. Her father was a surgeon who died when she was young. Shortly after his death, they moved to Long Island in New York, to be with her maternal grandparents. There, she was raised by her widowed mother and her grandparents. Her mother was a school teacher and a social worker while her grandfather was a Methodist minister and her grandmother was a homemaker.

== Career and research ==
Hamburg had an extensive career in the area of medical psychiatry. She worked in the medical psychiatry departments of Stanford University, Harvard University, Mount Sinai, Icahn School of Medicine, and Weill Cornell Medical College at various points in her life. She focused most of her work on the stages of adolescence and the struggles that adolescents must overcome. She also advocated for peer counseling for teens in the 1960s and 1970s. She believed that adolescents benefit more from advising one another, rather than from an authority figure. They would tutor each other on many issues, such as academics, social issues, mental health and volunteer opportunities. She also researched about the effects of stress and related coping mechanisms with her husband. The stress factors they studied included anything from physical stress and depression to poverty and war. In 2004, they co-authored a book called "Learning to Live Together: Preventing Hatred and Violence in Child and Adolescent Development". This book focused on teaching children how to cope with and overcome hatred in healthy ways. She researched about how stress factors like diabetes and teen pregnancy could affect childhood development and subsequently, how this affects them as adults.

Hamburg and her husband were in similar career paths and later collaborated on many projects. They received the 2007 Rhoda and Bernard Sarnat International Award in Mental Health from the Institute of Medicine for their long careers in medicine and public service, while in October 2015, the couple received the Pardes Humanitarian Prize in Mental Health by the Brain & Behavior Research Foundation in recognition of their contributions to the understanding of mental health.

She received the Foremother Award from the National Center for Health Research in 2012 for her contributions to the community.

== Publications ==
- Lancaster, Jane B.; Hamburg, Beatrix A. (1986). School-age pregnancy and parenthood : biosocial dimensions. New York: Aldine-De Gruyter Pub. Co. ISBN 0202303217.
- Hamburg, Beatrix A. (1994). Children and families in a changing world : challenges and opportunities. Austin, TX: Hogg Foundation for Mental Health.
- Hamburg, Beatrix A.; Williams, Kirk R.; Elliot, Delbert S. (1999). Violence in American schools : a new perspective. Cambridge: Cambridge University Press. ISBN 0521644186.
- Hamburg, Beatrix A. (1990). Life skills training : preventive interventions for young adolescents. Washington, DC: Carnegie Council on Adolescent Development, Life Skills Training Working Group.

== Personal life ==
Hamburg met her future husband David, an academic physician who has done mental health research, when they were both students at Yale University in 1948. The two married in 1951, and had two children: Eric, a filmmaker, and Margaret, a physician who served as Food and Drug Administration commissioner under President Barack Obama.

Hamburg died as a result of Alzheimer's disease at her daughter's home on April 15, 2018, at the age of 94.
