= Shelly Flagel =

American behavioral neuroscientist

Shelly B. Flagel
- Education: University of Michigan
- Known for: Neurobiology of reward learning and vulnerability to addiction
- Children: 2
- Scientific career
- Fields: Neurobiology
- Workplaces: University of Michigan Medical School Department of Psychiatry

Shelly B. Flagel is an American behavioral neuroscientist whose research focuses on the underlying brain mechanisms of reward and addiction. She is an associate professor of psychiatry in the Molecular and Behavioral Neuroscience Institute at the University of Michigan.

== Early life and education ==
Flagel was born and raised in Middletown, Ohio. She completed a bachelor of science with honors in biopsychology at University of Michigan (UM). Flagel did an undergraduate thesis project under her mentor Israel Liberzon. She earned a doctor of philosophy in neuroscience at UM. Her doctoral advisors were Delia M. Vazquez and Terry E. Robinson. She investigated the impact of early life stress on drug-taking behavior in adults. Flagel conducted postdoctoral research in Huda Akil's laboratory.

== Career and research ==
Following her postdoctoral research, Flagel started her lab in the Molecular and Behavioral Neuroscience Institute at the University of Michigan in 2011 and is now an associate professor in the department of psychiatry in the Molecular and Behavioral Neuroscience Institute at UM. She investigates the individual differences in addiction and impulse control disorders, reward learning, and motivated behavior neurobiology. Her work is discussed in the Encyclopedia of Psychopharmacology, The Scientist Magazine, Scientific American, explaining addiction in layman terms, and discussing if there are any inherent factors, and the issues of how the brain operates control (willpower).

== Personal life ==
Flagel has two sons.
