= Stanley Watson (neuroscientist) =

Stanley J. Watson Jr. is a neuroscientist whose research focuses on regulation by the central nervous system of behavior in the brains of individuals with severe mental illness. He is the co-director of the Molecular and Behavioral Neuroscience Institute with Huda Akil and the Ralph Waldo Gerard Professor of Neuroscience and Psychiatry at the University of Michigan. He is also the co-director of the University of Michigan node of the Pritzker Neuropsychiatric Disorders Research Consortium.

He is an original member of the ISI Highly Cited Researchers database and ranks as one of the most highly cited neuroscientists in the world by the Science Citation Index. He was elected a member of the National Academy of Medicine (NAM) in 1994 and served as a principal investigator for the study on which a 1999 NAM report on medical marijuana was based.
