= Tryptophan pyrrolase =

Tryptophan pyrrolase may refer to:

- Tryptophan 2,3-dioxygenase, an enzyme
- Indoleamine 2,3-dioxygenase, an enzyme
