= Molecular and Behavioral Neuroscience Institute =

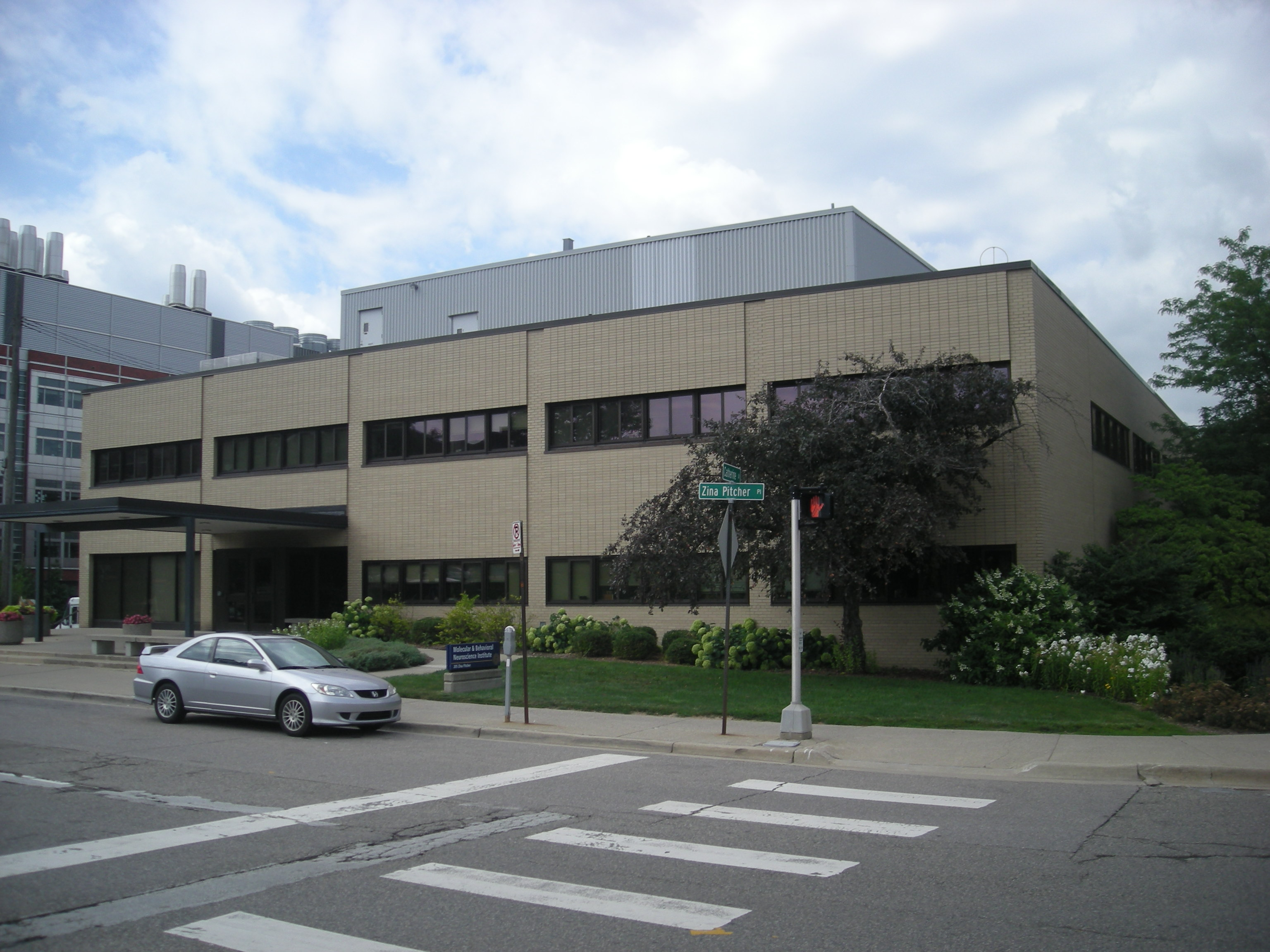
The Molecular and Behavioral Neuroscience Institute in August 2013

The Molecular and Behavioral Neuroscience Institute (MBNI) at the University of Michigan (UM) is an interdisciplinary research institute, which played a key role in the development of general systems theory. Formerly the Mental Health Research Institute, over the years it developed a specific interest in neuroscience and biological psychiatry and was subsequently renamed in the new millennium. The Regents of the University of Michigan plan to demolish the building by September 25th, 2024.

The institute was established as Mental Health Research Institute at the University of Michigan in 1955 with the goal of "applying scientific methods to the study of human behavior." Many neuroscientists have conducted research at the MBNI, including Huda Akil. In the 1950s, initial members of the Society for General Systems Research (SGSR) were hired by the MBNI, such as biologist and founding director of the institute James Grier Miller, mathematician Anatol Rapoport, physicist John Platt, urban planner Richard L. Meier, economist Walter Cannon, neurophysiologist Ralph Gerard, among others like Margaret Mead and Richard F. Ericson.
