= Ian Q. Whishaw =

Canadian neuropsychologist (born 1939)

- Born: Ian Quentin Whishaw; July 14, 1939 (age 86); Johannesburg, South Africa
- Citizenship: Canadian
- Scientific career
- Fields: Neuroscience, Psychology
- Website: www.uleth.ca/artsci/neuroscience/dr-ian-q-whishaw

Ian Quentin Whishaw (born 1939), known as Ian Q. Whishaw, is a Canadian neuropsychologist who has contributed extensively to the understanding of the cortical organization and its relation to stroke, Parkinson’s, spatial navigation, and behavior. Whishaw is a professor of neuroscience and psychology at the University of Lethbridge and has authored over 460 scientific papers and five books on neuroscience subjects that include a wide range of mammalian species. His interests include varsity football, rugby, basketball, creative writing, and dog and horse training.

== Research and theories ==
Whishaw has contributed to scientific understanding of areas including but not limited to hypothalamic organization, feeding, drinking, brain damage and recovery, child development, and cognitive and behavioral disorders and the evolution of skilled motor behavior. He is best known for his work on movement and the motor cortex, spatial navigation, and the behavior of the laboratory rat.

Movement and the Motor Cortex

Whishaw is considered a world expert on hand and finger use of rodents. He found that rats use their hands and fingers to pick things up; a discovery that extended our understanding that the skilled movements thought to uniquely characterize primates includes other orders of vertebrates. The finding led to the study of the use of the forelimb in feeding behavior across all vertebrate species with the conclusion that forelimb use in feeding is conserved and extends to the phylogenetically earliest vertebrates. He further proposes that forelimb use includes at least three movements, a reach that extends arm/hand in relation to the extrinsic (location) properties of objects, a grasp that is made in relation to the intrinsic (size/shape) features of objects, and a withdraw that carries a grasped object to the mouth. Each of the movements is proposed to feature its own neural pathway or channel from sensory receptors to motor effectors and its own evolutionary history, accounting for the wide variety of hand and finger use skills in vertebrates. This work was influential in developing Feeding in Vertebrates, a book co-authored with Vincent Bels.

The channel theory is also influential in understanding how movement is affected by injury or disease. The understanding of the rodent forepaw dexterity and use led to a range of studies that including motor cortex organization, neural plasticity, limb preference, dopamine release, sensory control, and other areas of behavior and physiology. Whishaw’s work on rodent forelimb reaching influenced similar research approaches to humans, with broad implications for brain injury and rehabilitation research. He is also responsible for developing a mouse model of skilled hand use that is useful for studying impairments, compensation, and recovery following brain or spinal injury. Whishaw’s research is recognized as helping the approximately 60,000 Canadians that suffer from brain injury each year, including stroke, Huntington disease and Parkinson disease.

Spatial Navigation

Much of Whishaw’s early work on brain function was based on EEG recordings made from the hippocampus and neocortex that showed that electrical brain events are related to ongoing movement and so do not reflect mental states. He has described himself as a “Vanderwolfian”, accrediting his careful study of animal behavior to his PhD supervisor, Case Vanderwolf with subsequent influences from Philip Tietelbaum. His work on spatial navigation argues that the hippocampus is important for the spatial behavior known as dead reckoning, the relatively automatic process of determining the shortest way back to a starting location after an outward trip. Dead reckoning is the navigation strategy used by Columbus to reach the America’s and return to Spain. The dead reckoning theory proposes that there are three aspects of space that are central to an animal’s survival; where home is, where the animal is at the movement, and how to return home. He also suggests in Neuroscience and Behavioral Reviews in 1998 rats with hippocampal lesions have considerable place learning ability that they are often unable to capitalize on it because of their dead reckoning impairment.

The Behavior of the Laboratory Rat

In addition to his expertise in rodent reaching and spatial behavior, Whishaw is known as “The Rat Whisperer” for his extensive experience and knowledge of rodent behavior. He compiled his extensive knowledge of rodent behavior in his 2004 book The Behavior of the Laboratory Rat, coedited with colleague Bryan Kolb, with various models and tests to quantify rodent behavior. The individual chapters of the book highlight the extraordinary range of complex natural and laboratory-based behavior displayed by a rat and underline the challenges in understanding how this behavior is produced by a brain that weighs only 2 grams. This book is the foundation for comparative investigations of the similarities and differences between rats and other mammals.

== Early life and education ==
Ian Whishaw was born on July 14, 1939, to Quentin and Lorna Whishaw in Johannesburg, South Africa. Ian’s father worked as a geologist and served in World War II as a South African pilot. His mother was fluent in 7 languages and worked as a linguist and spy for the secret service throughout the war. She subsequently studied for her PhD and is the author of two books. As Far as You’ll Take Me describes a hitchhiking trip through the Yukon and Alaska and Mexico Unknown describes her and her daughter Iona’s adventure of driving the first car over the newly constructed PanAmerican highway.

After the war, the family moved to England where Ian was enrolled in a boarding school. He attended less than a year before being expelled for misbehavior. At age six, Ian traveled alone by ship from Liverpool to Montreal, Canada. He then took a train across Canada to Invermere, British Columbia where he was reunited with his family. He was raised on Kootenay Lake in Queens Bay and received his primary education in schools in the Kootenay district.

Ian attended Vancouver College for his secondary education, and his post-secondary began at the University of Notre Dame’s Indiana campus. He then transferred to the Nelson campus, then the Gonzaga campus in Washington. He went on to complete a B.A. in English at the University of Alberta’s Calgary campus in 1965.

Whishaw received his M.Sc. in Physiological Psychology from the University of Calgary in 1968 under the supervision of Dr. Rod Cooper. His master’s thesis was titled “Strychnine: Suppression of Exploration”, and was published the following year in Physiology and Behavior. Whishaw then completed his Ph.D. in 1971 at the University of Western Ontario under the supervision of Case Vanderwolf. His Ph.D. thesis was titled "Hippocampal Activity and Behavior" and was published in the Journal of Comparative and Physiological Psychology in 1972.

Whishaw started as an assistant professor at the University of Lethbridge in 1970, where he was responsible for teaching five different courses per semester. He worked with Warren Veale in the summers of 1971 and 1972 at the University of Calgary and completed his own lab at the University of Lethbridge in 1972. Despite his small lab in a small undergraduate college with limited resources, Whishaw authored over 200 publications by the time his university offered its first M.Sc. He has done sabbaticals with Philip Teitlebaum, one of the leaders in physiological psychology, Stephen Dunnett, a pioneer in neural transplantation, at the University of Cambridge, England, and with Bruno Will in Strasbourg France and with Michel le Moal in Bordeaux, France.

Whishaw is currently a professor of neuroscience at the University of Lethbridge, where he has directly mentored over 30 graduate students and grandfathered nearly 200 graduate students across Canada, the United States, and Europe. Whishaw holds a Board of Governor’s Chair in Neuroscience, and has had visiting appointments at the University of Texas, the University of Michigan, Cambridge University, and the University of Strasbourg, France.

== Awards and honors ==
Whishaw has received numerous awards for his contributions to neuropsychology, including fellowships to the Canadian Psychological Association, the American Psychological Association, Clare Hall of Cambridge University, and the Royal Society of Canada Academy of Science. He has also received an honorary Doctor of Letters from the University of Lethbridge (2008) and an honorary Doctor of Science degree from Thompson Rivers University (2010).

Whishaw received the Karl Spencer Lashley Award from the Canadian Psychological Association, and the CSBBCS Donald O. Hebb Award in 2014 for Distinguished Scientific Achievement. He is a member of the Hotchkiss Brain Institute in Calgary, and president of NeuroDetective, Inc, Neurotext Inc, and a board member of NeuroInvestigations Inc.

The University of Lethbridge awarded Dr. Whishaw the Ingrid Speaker Gold Metal, the university’s highest honor, to recognize his research, scholarship, and teaching. The Institute for Scientific Information lists him as one of the most cited Neuroscientists, one of only 10 Canadians, the only Albertan, with the 2014 highest H-index of all neuroscientists in Canada. Whishaw has also been recognized for his contributions as a teacher, leader and mentor in the neuroscience community. He received the distinguished teaching award from the University of Lethbridge, and the Alberta Science and Technology Outstanding Leadership in Alberta Science Award in 2009.

== Books and Other Public Outreach ==
Whishaw has cowritten two textbooks with colleague Bryan Kolb which have been published in multiple languages. Their first book, Fundamentals of Human Neuropsychology, a pioneering textbook of the new disciple of neuropsychology was originally published in 1980 and is now in its seventh edition with over 4,500 citations. Their second book, An Introduction to Brain and Behavior, features a human-centric approach to the basic science of the brain and is currently in its sixth edition. Both books are used as required reading for students enrolled in liberal arts at the University of Lethbridge.

In 2004, Whishaw and Kolb published The Behavior of the Laboratory Rat: A Handbook with Tests, which has been described as a bible for rat researchers with over 200 citations and chapters on fear, pain, taste, sex, stress, and models and tests for rat behavior. Whishaw’s other books include in 2017, Brain and Behaviour: Revisiting the Classic Studies, and the Evolution of Feeding in Vertebrates in 2019.

== Personal life ==
Whishaw is married and has two children. His sister Iona Whishaw is author of the Lane Winslow mystery series. He has maintained a close personal and working relationship with coworkers, former students and fellow scientists, including Terry Robinson and Timothy Schallert, Jenni Karl and his enduring writing partner, Bryan Kolb.
