= Jack Barchas =

American psychiatrist

Jack David Barchas (born November 2, 1935) is an American psychiatrist who is the Barklie McKee Henry Professor and Chairman of the Department of Psychiatry at the Weill Cornell Medical College of Cornell University and the Psychiatrist-in-Chief of the New York-Presbyterian Hospital/Weill Cornell Medical Center and the Payne Whitney Psychiatric Clinic. He was formerly the Nancy Friend Pritzker professor in psychiatry at Stanford University and dean of research and neuroscience at the University of California, Los Angeles School of Medicine.

In 2006 the Institute of Medicine (now the National Academy of Medicine) gave him their Rhoda and Bernard Sarnat International Award in Mental Health.

Barchas earned a Bachelor of Arts from Pomona College in 1956 and his medical degree from Yale Medical School in 1961.
