= André Fenton =

American neuroscientist

André A. Fenton
- Born: 1967 (age 58–59); Georgetown, Guyana
- Education: SUNY Health Science Center
- Scientific career
- Workplaces: New York University; Czech Academy of Sciences
- Thesis: How two cues conjointly control hippocampal place fields (1992)

André A. Fenton (born 1967) is a Guyanese-Canadian-American neuroscientist who is a Professor of Neural Science at New York University. He studies how brains store and experience memories. He has been co-host of the television show NOVA Wonders.

== Early life and education ==
Fenton was born in Georgetown, Guyana. He lived there until he was seven years old, when his mother was recruited to join IBM in Toronto. As a high school student, Fenton was interested in literature. Whilst he had originally planned to study English at university, he accidentally took a biology course, where he first came across neural communication. He eventually majored in biology at McGill University in Canada. His undergraduate dissertation considered the neurobiology of crickets. After graduating, Fenton joined the Institute of Physiology at the Czech Academy of Sciences. Here he worked in the research group of Jan Bures, where he specialised in the hippocampus. He created a spinning platform that allowed investigations of how long rats can stay on track of their location, a neuroscientific device which became known as a rotating arena. Fenton earned his doctoral degree at the State University of New York Health Science Center. His research considered how cues impact hippocampal place fields.

== Research and career ==
Fenton was appointed Professor of Neural Science at New York University in 2010. Fenton is interested in how brains create, store and experience memories. His research makes use of molecular and electrophysiological experimental techniques in combination with theoretical analysis. Working with Todd Sacktor, Fenton identified PKMzeta (protein kinase C zeta type) as an essential component of long-term memory. To achieve this, Fenton and Sacktor made use of his rotating arena and the ζ (Z) inhibitory peptide (ZIP) in specific parts of the brain, showing that ZIP-infusion into the hippocampus could erase long-term memory for a particular location. The discovery was selected by Science as one of the Breakthroughs of the Year.

To understand how the hippocampus is involved with information processing, Fenton studied the impact of formation and recollection of memories across a range of different timescales. He identified that information processing requires exquisite neural coordination, requiring synchronous neural discharge, with desynchronisation occurring when information is conflicting. This neural coordination can be disturbed in certain neurological disorders, including epilepsy, autism and traumatic brain injury.

Fenton studies brain activity using a low-cost, wireless digital device called the microEEG, which allows long-term recording of neural function via electroencephalography. He founded the spin-out company Bio-Signal Group Corp, which manufacture the microEEG device. It was approved for use in clinical and research settings by the Food and Drug Administration in 2012.

== Awards and honours ==
Fenton is co-host of the NOVA television programme Wonders. He was awarded the 2019 Caribbean American Heritage Award for Excellence in Science and Technology. In 2020 Fenton was announced by Cell Press as one of the Top 100 Black Scientists in America.

== Selected publications ==
- Fenton, André (2015). "Coordinating with the "Inner GPS"". Hippocampus. 25 (6): 763–769. doi:10.1002/hipo.22451. PMID 25800714. Wikidata Q38387989.
- Sahay, Amar; Scobie, Kimberly N.; Hill, Alexis S.; O'Carroll, Colin M.; Kheirbek, Mazen A.; Burghardt, Nesha S.; Fenton, André A.; Dranovsky, Alex; Hen, René (2011-04-03). "Increasing adult hippocampal neurogenesis is sufficient to improve pattern separation". Nature. 472 (7344): 466–470. Bibcode:2011Natur.472..466S. doi:10.1038/nature09817. ISSN 1476-4687. PMC 3084370. PMID 21460835.
- Pastalkova, Eva; Serrano, Peter; Pinkhasova, Deana; Wallace, Emma; Fenton, André Antonio; Sacktor, Todd Charlton (2006-08-25). "Storage of Spatial Information by the Maintenance Mechanism of LTP". Science. 313 (5790): 1141–1144. Bibcode:2006Sci...313.1141P. doi:10.1126/science.1128657. ISSN 0036-8075. PMID 16931766. S2CID 7260010.
- Kheirbek, Mazen A.; Drew, Liam J.; Burghardt, Nesha S.; Costantini, Daniel O.; Tannenholz, Lindsay; Ahmari, Susanne E.; Zeng, Hongkui; Fenton, André A.; Hen, René (2013-03-06). "Differential Control of Learning and Anxiety along the Dorsoventral Axis of the Dentate Gyrus". Neuron. 77 (5): 955–968. doi:10.1016/j.neuron.2012.12.038. ISSN 0896-6273. PMC 3595120. PMID 23473324.
