= Huda Akil =

Syrian-American neuroscientist (born 1945)

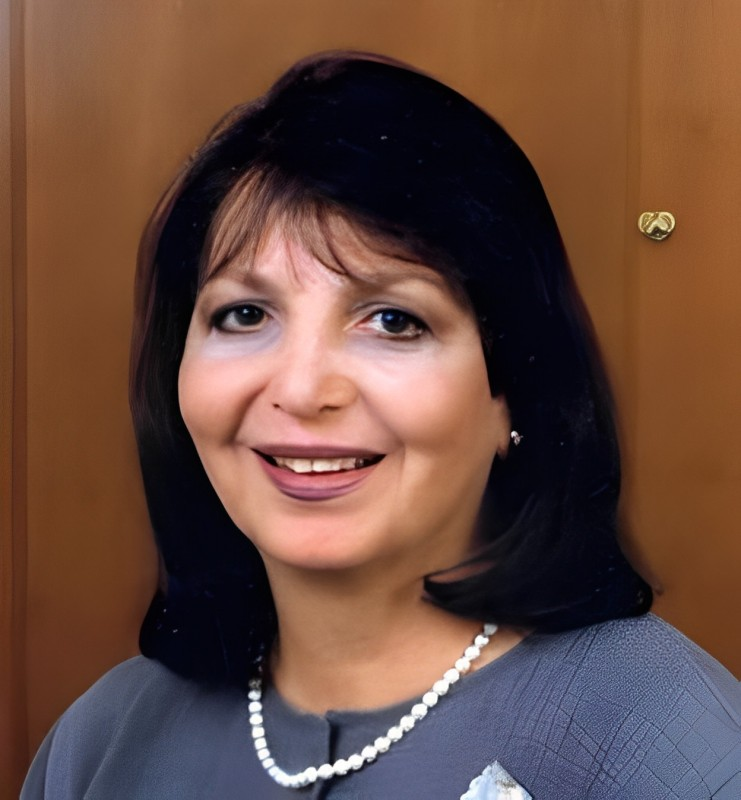
- Born: May 19, 1945 (age 81); Damascus, Syria
- Citizenship: United States of America
- Known for: Systems Neuroscience, Stress Induced Analgesia, Neurobiology of emotions and mental health disorders
- Spouse: Stanley Watson
- Awards: Gruber Neuroscience Prize 2023; National Medal of Science 2023
- Scientific career
- Fields: Neuroscience
- Workplaces: University of Michigan Medical School Department of Psychiatry; Stanford University; University of California, Los Angeles; University of Iowa; American University of Beirut
- Thesis: Monoaminergic mechanisms underlying stimulation-produced analgesia (1972)

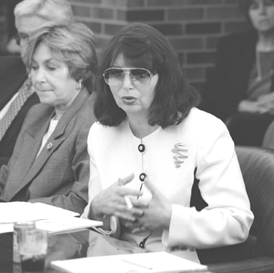

Huda Akil (Arabic: هدی عاقل; born 1945) is a Syrian-American neuroscientist whose research has contributed to the understanding of the neurobiology of emotions, including pain, anxiety, depression, and substance abuse. Akil and her colleagues are best known for providing the first physiological evidence for a role of endorphins in the brain and demonstrating that endorphins are activated by stress and can cause pain inhibition.

Akil is a Gardner C. Quarton Distinguished Professor of Neurosciences in the Department of Psychiatry at the University of Michigan Medical School. She previously served as co-director of the Molecular and Behavioral Neuroscience institute and the University of Michigan node of the Pritzker Neuropsychiatric Disorders Research Consortium with her husband, Stanley Watson. Akil is also one of seven leading scientists that comprise the Hope For Depression Research Task Force, whom developed a research plan that combines the currently most advanced knowledge in genetics, epigenetics, molecular biology, electrophysiology, and brain imaging in an effort to accelerate cutting-edge scientific research pertaining to depression and its related mood and emotional disorders. Throughout her career, she has been honored with numerous awards and membership to various societies, most notably she served as a past President of the Society for Neuroscience, the largest neuroscience organization in the world.

== Early life and education ==
She was inspired to pursue a life of science after reading a book on Marie Curie, the great physicist and Nobel Prize winner, that was given to her by one of the French nuns at the library. She refers to this instance as a "turning point" in her life where she realized that a woman who grew up far away from the centers of knowledge, Great Britain, France, and the United States, could become a great scientist, like Curie. She pursued her undergraduate degree at the American University of Beirut in Lebanon. She entered university as a sophomore, on a scholarship from the Rockefeller Foundation that required her to earn straight As, especially difficult, since she was not fluent in English. She fulfilled the requirement and graduated in 1967 summa cum laude with a Bachelor of Arts in Psychology. Akil initially took interest in the psychology of language, originally sparked by her father, who was a psychologist.

Following graduation, Akil continued at the American University of Beirut with a teaching apprenticeship for a year before traveling to the United States to pursue further education at the University of Iowa. There, she took a course on the basics of neuroscience and pharmacology and was intrigued, which led her to complete a rotation in the electrophysiology lab where she did research on learning with Steve Fox. Akil was soon accepted to the University of California Los Angeles to pursue her doctoral degree. At UCLA she worked with John Liebeskind on pain research and, after completing her Ph.D., she joined the laboratory of Jack Barchas at Stanford University.

== Career and research ==
Akil's research covers many areas, but is collectively rooted in understanding emotions. Throughout her career her research has included work on opiate receptors, structure function analyses, behavioral studies, the neurobiology of severe psychiatric disorder, post mortem brains, and molecular genetic research. Akil says, "It has always been about trying to understand the circuits of emotions. I have always been interested in how the process of responding to the world changes the brain and how, in turn, the brain changes an animals environment and perceptions of the world. I love all of it."

In 1970 Akil joined John Liebeskind, an assistant professor at UCLA who was interested in the neurobiology of pain, and more specifically focused on the neural circuitry of phantom pain, and the idea that phantom pain was not a purely physical phenomenon, but had a psychological role as well. Another member of the lab observed that electrical stimulation reduced, rather than enhanced pain experience, which inspired Akil and fellow graduate student, David Mayer, to continue to research this phenomenon, which they later referred to as “stimulation produced analgesia" (SPA). Working on rats, they found that stimulation at several mesencephalic and diencephalic sites eradicated responsiveness to painful stimuli and left other sensory modes relatively unaffected. This idea of SPA became the topic of Akil's Ph.D. dissertation. Further research in this area was conducted in the rat by employing the D'Amour and Smith tail flick test in order to investigate role played by the cerebral monoamines, dopamine, noradrenaline, and serotonin. Akil and colleagues used four different approaches to alter transmission in monoamine pathways: depletion of monoamine stores, replacement of depleted monoamine stores, potentiation of monamine systems, and blockade of catecholamine receptors; the four approaches produced internally consistent results. In 1977, they discovered that the narcotic antagonist naloxone partially reverses analgesia produced by focal electrical stimulation of the brain. In this study analgesia was produced in the periaqueductal gray matter, which is an area of the brain that is known to contain a large number of opiate binding sites. This study along with results from other studies conducted at the time suggested that there is a natural neural system in the brain, which uses a morphine-like substance to produce analgesia, however it was not known if the activation of this system was brought about pharmacologically by direct receptor stimulation or electrically by release of the endogenous substance.

A combination of behavioral, pharmacological, and biochemical research led Akil and colleagues of the Barchas Laboratory at Stanford to the endorphins, specifically two peptides called enkephalins. What followed was a race against other research groups to isolate these morphine-like chemicals and determine what activates the system. Essentially, they developed a model of stress induced analgesia that was naloxone responsive. Building on prior research, Akil and colleagues established that in the rat, inescapable acute stress causes a significant increase in the opioid peptides, enkephalins and endorphins with a concurrent reduction in pain responsiveness.

Akil continued research in the area of opioid peptides and their receptors at the University of Michigan Mental Health Research Institute where she was employed as a basic scientist. Her group combined their research efforts with those of her husband, who was also employed at the University of Michigan as a biological psychiatrist. After characterizing the anatomy of four opioid peptides, beta-endorphin, dynorphin, methionine enkephalin, and leucine enkephalin, and their receptors, the two groups cloned two types of receptors and performed structure-function analyses in order to determine the molecular basis of high affinity and selectivity towards endogenous ligands. Over the years the two laboratories have conducted extensive research in a variety of molecular and neural mechanisms associated with stress reactivity and their relation to anxiety and depression, focusing on the link of opioids and their receptors in stress induced analgesia as well as the role of steroid stress hormone receptors in emotionality. Furthermore, Akil and Watson were the first to demonstrate that there is an abnormal, decreased sensitivity to glucocorticoid fast feedback that occurs at the level of the brain, rather than the pituitary in depressed patients.

Currently, the Akil Laboratory is working to develop animal models in order to understand the genetic and developmental basis of differences in temperament and the implications of these inborn differences for vulnerability to anxiety, depression and substance abuse. Numerous former post-doctoral fellows in the Akil Laboratory have gone on to open their own laboratories, including Dr. Shelly Flagel.

== Honors and awards ==
Member:
US National Academy of Sciences
US National Academy of Medicine
American Academy of Arts and Sciences Akil is a decorated scientist, who has been the recipient of numerous awards throughout her career. In 1993, she received the National Institute on Drug Abuse Pacesetter Award. The following year she was the co-recipient, with Stanley Watson, of the Robert J. and Claire Pasarow Foundation Medical Research Award for Neuropsychiatry. In 1998, Akil was honored with the Sachar Award from Columbia University and the Bristol Myers Squibb Unrestricted Research Funds Award. She accepted the John P. McGovern Award in Behavioral Sciences from the American Academy of Arts and Sciences in 2006 and in 2007 was the recipient of the Society for Neuroscience Mika Salpeter Lifetime Achievement Award and the Patricia Goldman-Rakic Prize for Cognitive Neuroscience. Within the past five years Akil has continued to receive awards for her research, which include, the Paul Hoch Distinguished Research Service Award from the American College of Neuropsychopharmacology in 2010, the 2012 Sarnat Prize from the Institute of Medicine with Watson, and the AAMC 2013 Award for Distinguished Research in the Biomedical Sciences. In 2023 she was awarded the Gruber Prize in Neuroscience and the National Medal of Science.

Akil is a member of Institute of Medicine of the National Academy of Sciences, the American Association for the Advancement of Science, and the American Academy of Arts and Sciences. Furthermore, she has served as the President of the American College of Neuropsychopharmacology (1998) and President of the Society for Neuroscience (2004), the largest neuroscience organization in the world. Akil is currently the co-chair for the Neuroscience Steering Committee at the Foundation for the National Institute of Health and serves on the Council of the Institute of Medicine of the US National Academy of Sciences.

== Personal life ==
Akil is married to Stanley Watson. They co-direct the University of Michigan Medical School's Molecular and Behavioral Neuroscience Institute and each has played an integral role in the other's career. The couple has two children, Brendon (also a neuroscientist at the University of Michigan) and Kathleen. Akil describes her approach to parenting her children as going at it "full throttle", keeping her career on track and raising her children simultaneously.
