= Bryan Kolb =

Canadian neuroscientist and neuropsychologist

- Born: Bryan Edward Kolb; 1947 (age 78–79); Calgary, Alberta, Canada
- Awards: OC (2016), RSC (2000)
- Scientific career
- Fields: Neuroscience
- Institutions: University of Lethbridge
- Website: www.uleth.ca/artsci/neuroscience/dr-bryan-e-kolb

Bryan Edward Kolb OC FRSC (born 1947) is a Canadian neuroscientist, neuropsychologist, researcher, author and educator. Kolb's research focuses on the organization and functions of the cerebral cortex.

In 1976, Kolb's PhD thesis established the utility of employing rats for study of the prefrontal cortex in medical research. opening up a new venue for non-primate animal research in the prefrontal cortex and accelerating the development of new treatments that help victims of disease and cerebral injury. He was the first to demonstrate how the regrowth of brain cells accompanies restoration of brain function and also the first to show, with Terry Robinson, that psychoactive drugs change neuronal structures and networks permanently and in a manner such that later neuroplasticity is altered.

Kolb has contributed extensively to the literature of neuroplasticity during development and in response to experience, drugs, hormones and injury; including how these changes influence behavior. Kolb's 1980 textbook Fundamentals of Neuropsychology, co-authored with colleague Ian Whishaw, helped define the field of neuropsychology and as of 2015 is in its seventh edition. Kolb has published over 400 articles and chapters including co-authoring popular textbooks in neuropsychology and behavioral neuroscience. He is a professor of Neuroscience and holds a Board of Governors' Research Chair in Neuroscience at the University of Lethbridge. He is a primary investigator at the Canadian Centre for Behavioral Neuroscience which he was key in establishing. In 2016 Kolb was inducted as an Officer of the Order of Canada.

== Early life and education ==
Bryan Edward Kolb was born in 1947 in Calgary, Canada. Kolb's father Jack Kolb was actively pursuing success in the Calgary's burgeoning oil industry in the 1950s, and his mother Virginia was a professional dancer turned stay-at-home mother. From a very early age Bryan gravitated to precision measurements. In school he excelled in science though struggled with English and history. He later attended the University of Calgary planning to enter law school after obtaining an undergraduate in Psychology. However Kolb became fascinated by the work of eminent human brain researchers such as fellow Canadians Brenda Milner (with whom he would later work) and Wilder Penfield who performed lesion studies. He completed his studies in Calgary with both Bachelor of Science (1968) and Master of Science (1970) degrees in Psychology.

Kolb completed his PhD in psychology in 1973 at Pennsylvania State University, under the supervision of John Michael Warren. While working with Warren, Kolb wondered whether lesion studies of the human prefrontal cortex could be extended to non-primates such as rats. If this were true using non-primates could facilitate research for illnesses such as Parkinson's disease. For his thesis, Kolb demonstrated that rat possessed a prefrontal cortex. This finding accelerated the rate of learning for lesion studies of the prefrontal cortex opening up a new more cost and time effective vehicle for animal studies research that prior to this time had been largely confined to more costly and more time-consuming studies of non-human primates.

== Professional career and leadership ==
Kolb returned to Canada to do postdoctoral work in electrophysiology with Cornelius Vanderwolf from 1973 to 1975, followed by additional postdoctoral work at the Montreal Neurological Institute (MNI) at McGill University studying brain-injured patients with Brenda Milner. He was offered a research position at the MNI from Milner but chose instead to accept a professorship at the University of Lethbridge (U of L) where he could pursue his own research focusing on the comparative physiology of the rat and human diseases including Parkinson's Disease, Stroke and developmental disorders. He has remained at the U of L ever since.

Kolb is likely best known for his textbook, Fundamentals of Neuropsychology, as of 2019 in its seventh edition and in multiple languages, which he wrote with his longtime colleague, Ian Whishaw. Originally published in 1980, this book was the first in the new field of neuropsychology and has been described as "the book that defined the field." The book is said to be "the most stolen textbook in England". Kolb and Whishaw also co-authored the entry level textbook An Introduction to Brain and Behavior now in its sixth edition. As of 2017, Kolb has also published five other books, and over 400 papers and chapters.

Kolb was influential in transforming the originally 5170 m^{2} Life Sciences Building on the campus of the University of Lethbridge into the Canadian Centre for Behavioural Neuroscience. The centre has been an integral part of establishing the University of Lethbridge as the top rated university in Canada for undergraduate research.

Kolb is a theme leader for the Canadian Stroke Network and an adjunct professor at the University of British Columbia and University of Calgary, as well as the Hotchkiss Brain Institute in Calgary, Alberta. Kolb has served as president of the Experimental Division of the Canadian Psychological Association, President of the Canadian Society for Brain, Behavior, and Cognitive Science and is senior fellow of Child & Brain Development for the Canadian Institute for Advanced Research.

== Research ==
While working with Mike Warren at Penn State, Kolb became interested in the prefrontal cortex. Warren was doing work comparing the prefrontal cortex of cats and monkeys, which led Kolb to wonder if rodents had a prefrontal cortex. A seminal paper by Christiana Leonard provided an anatomical basis for this possibility, leading to Kolb's demonstration that rodents have frontal areas that appear homologous to prefrontal areas in the primate. Although the rodent prefrontal cortex is millions of evolutionary years removed from that of primates, including humans, his work showed that laboratory rodents could provide a useful model for studying cognitive, motor, and emotional functions of the prefrontal cortex. In parallel, Kolb began to study the role of age in understanding the effects of early brain injury and he published seminal papers showing that the effects of early brain injury varied exquisitely with the precise age and that at certain ages there was remarkable neuronal plasticity leading to functional restitution whereas at other ages the outcome was abysmal. Later studies with longtime colleague Robbin Gibb showed that both pre- and post brain injury treatments at all ages could enhance functional recovery. Kolb was the first to show that some treatments stimulate neurogenesis in the neocortex, which underlies some of the recovery.

In recent years his research focus has shifted more to the examination of how environmental events, including drugs, stress, hormones, and learning differentially affect brain and behavior at different developmental ages by altering neuronal morphology, gene expression, and ultimately behavior. His work on the effects of drugs on neuronal morphology, in collaboration with Terry Robinson (University of Michigan), was the first to show that the physical structure of neurons becomes altered by addictive drugs, thus showing that drugs physically alter brain systems.

== Awards and honors ==
Kolb has been given four honorary degrees and is a Fellow of the Royal Society of Canada (2000). He is also a Fellow of the American Psychological Association (1983), Canadian Psychological Association (CPA) (1984), Association for Psychological Science (1985), and the Canadian Society for Brain, Behaviour, and Cognitive Science (CSBBCS) (2017). In 2000, he was awarded the CPA's Donald O. Hebb Award for Distinguished Contributions to Psychology as a Science and in 2002, the CSBBCS's Donald O. Hebb Distinguished Contribution Award.

Kolb is a recipient of the Killam Fellowship a from the Canada Council along with the Queen's Diamond Jubilee Medal. Kolb has been a senior Fellow with Canadian Institutes for Advanced Research since 2003. In 2016, Kolb was inducted as an Officer of the Order of Canada "for his leadership and for his contributions to our scientific understanding of brain function and development."
