= David A. Hamburg =

American psychiatrist (1925–2019)

David Allen Hamburg (October 1, 1925 – April 21, 2019) was an American psychiatrist. He served as president of the Carnegie Corporation of New York from 1982 to 1997. He also served as the President of the Institute of Medicine, National Academy of Sciences and president of the American Association for the Advancement of Science. He had also been a member of the National Academy of Sciences since 1998. He was also a member of the American Academy of Arts and Sciences and the American Philosophical Society. He had previously been chair of the department of psychiatry at Stanford. His wife, Beatrix Hamburg, followed a similarly successful career path. Their daughter, Margaret Hamburg, is a physician who has followed their footsteps into public service becoming Commissioner of the Food and Drug Administration in 2009. His son, Eric Hamburg, is an author, attorney and film producer in Los Angeles.

Hamburg was born in Evansville, Indiana. He was awarded the Public Welfare Medal of the National Academy of Sciences in 1998, its most prestigious award, and the Presidential Medal of Freedom in 1996. In 2007 he and his wife received the Rhoda and Bernard Sarnat International Award in Mental Health from the Institute of Medicine for their long careers in medicine and public service. He died in Washington, D.C., on April 21, 2019, from ischemic colitis at the age of 93.
