= Case Vanderwolf =

Canadian neuroscientist

Cornelius Hendrik "Case" Vanderwolf (1935 – June 16, 2015) was a Canadian neuroscientist.

Raised in the rural community of Glenevis, Alberta, Vanderwolf went on to earn a BSc from the University of Alberta and completed graduate work with Donald Hebb at McGill University, completing his PhD in 1962 (Buzsaki and Bland 2015). Following completion of his PhD, Case spent a year at the California Institute of Technology with Roger Sperry (1962–1963) and another year with Konrad Akert, the Founder of the Brain Research Institute of the University of Zurich (1963–1964).

He published two books, An Odyssey Through the Brain, Behavior and Mind and The Evolving Brain: The Mind and the Neural Control of Behavior, that provide an overview of his academic career and research findings. In 2000, he was awarded an honorary degree from the University of Lethbridge.

He died unexpectedly in his home on June 16, 2015, in London, Ontario, at the age of 79.
