= Lieber Institute for Brain Development =

US research center

Coordinates: 39.30014°N 76.59062°W

The Lieber Institute for Brain Development (LIBD) is a nonprofit research center located in Baltimore, Maryland, that studies brain development issues such as schizophrenia and autism. The cause of most neuropsychiatric disorders remains unknown and current therapies such as antipsychotics and antidepressants treat symptoms rather than the underlying illness. Lieber is working to unravel the biological basis of these brain disorders and is developing therapies to treat or prevent their development.

== History and description ==
The Lieber Institute was started in 2010 by Steve and Connie Lieber along with Milton and Tamar Maltz—both families have children with schizophrenia. Psychiatrist Daniel R. Weinberger is the CEO. Having gathered over 3,000 brains for research purposes, the institute has the largest collection of post-mortem brains diagnosed with post-traumatic stress disorder. These brains are used to study the biological basis for mental illnesses. In one study of post-mortem brains, LIBD researchers found that patients with schizophrenia had high levels of DNA methylation in brain regions associated with risk for schizophrenia. They are also developing a drug to prevent post-traumatic stress disorder.

== Research and partnerships ==
In 2011, researchers who later joined the Lieber Institute published a review of brain banks for studying diseases such as schizophrenia, alzheimer’s diseases, bipolar disorder, and other psychiatric illnesses. Postmortem human brain tissue is critical for advancing neurobiological studies of psychiatric illness.

In a December 2015 paper in Neuron, the Lieber Institute announced the formation of a new consortium called BrainSeq, along with seven pharmaceutical partners. The consortium’s goal is to analyze post mortem brain samples for DNA, RNA and DNA-methylation differences establish a public database.

A paper by Lieber scientists found that altering brain proteins caused the cells of autistic brains to behave normally. The specific type of autism is called Pitt–Hopkins syndrome and researchers are looking into possible treatments that could be used for the condition and for other types of autism.

Researchers with Lieber published a paper in Nature Medicine that examined the placenta and found that genes and pregnancy problems combine to increase the likelihood of developing schizophrenia. This study adds to growing evidence that the placenta is critical to understanding the health and course of pregnancy.

== African Ancestry Neuroscience Research Initiative ==
In 2019, the Lieber Institute announced a new initiative to study brain diseases in African Americans. The venture is a partnership with the African-American Clergy Medical Research Initiative, a group of clergy leaders in Baltimore. Research suggests that neuropsychiatric diagnoses are 20% more frequent in African-American communities than in communities of European ancestry. In studies of brain disorders, individuals of African descent make up, on average, less than 5% of research cohorts. Lieber Institute Director Daniel R. Weinberger wrote that individuals of African ancestry must be included in research for brain illnesses.

The African Ancestry Neuroscience Research Initiative will generate brain gene and protein expression profiles for people of African ancestry, a group that is greatly underrepresented in research examining the genetic causes of diseases. Lack of research involving African Americans is problematic because African Americans are 20% more likely to experience serious mental health problems than the general population and are about twice as likely to develop Alzheimer’s disease. Suicide rates for African American children aged 5–11 are twice as high as comparable individuals of European ancestry even after controlling for socioeconomic factors. In the summer of 2020, Governor Larry Hogan of Maryland budgeted $1.25 million to the effort, with another $1 million coming from Brown Capital, one of the oldest African-American founded asset management firms in the country.

== LIBD Champions Council ==
LIBD established a champions council of celebrities to mobilize awareness of the need for brain research.
