= Guttmacher =

Guttmacher is a surname. Notable people with the surname include:

- Alan Edward Guttmacher (born 1949), pediatrician and medical geneticist. former director of the National Institute of Child Health (NICHD).
- Alan Frank Guttmacher (1898–1974), American obstetrician and gynecologist
- Adolf Guttmacher (1861–1915), German-American rabbi
- Karlheinz Guttmacher (born 1942), German politician
- Manfred Guttmacher (1898–1966), forensic psychiatrist

== See also ==
- Guttmacher Institute
