= Alan Guttmacher =

Alan Guttmacher may refer to the following American physicians:

- Alan Frank Guttmacher (1898-1974), obstetrician-gynecologist and activist
- Alan Edward Guttmacher (born 1949), pediatrician, geneticist, and research administrator
