= Minnesota Protocol =

The Minnesota Protocol on the Investigation of Potentially Unlawful Death (2016) is a set of international guidelines for the forensic investigation of suspicious deaths, particularly those in which the responsibility of a State is suspected (either as a result of act or omission).

The original version of the Protocol, from 1991, was entitled the Manual on the Effective Prevention and Investigation of Extra-Legal, Arbitrary and Summary Executions. It was designed to support the implementation of the United Nations Principles on the Effective Prevention and Investigation of Extra-Legal, Arbitrary and Summary Executions, which were endorsed by the United Nations in 1989. The Manual became known as the Minnesota Protocol because of the central role played by The Advocates for Human Rights (formerly named the Minnesota Lawyers International Human Rights Committee) in its development. The use of the term ‘Protocol’ reflects the forensic medicine element of the document rather than its legal status. In 2016, after a two-year process of revision, the new version of Minnesota Protocol was finalized by an international group of experts convened by the UN Special Rapporteur on extrajudicial, summary or arbitrary executions, and the Office of the United Nations High Commissioner for Human Rights (OHCHR). The revised version was published by the OHCHR in 2017.

== Background ==
The original Minnesota Protocol was designed to be a technical document aimed at providing practical assistance to those investigating suspicious deaths. Confronting the question of how to address political killings during the mid-1980s, various civil society groups came to the conclusion that criminal investigation techniques were an obvious starting place. In 1984, Amnesty International carried out its own survey of how various States dealt with autopsies of arbitrary killings. David Weissbrodt, a professor at the University of Minnesota, was spending a sabbatical in the Legal Office of Amnesty International in 1982–3, which was when the idea for a Manual arose.

The need for some kind of standard was highlighted by the assassination of Ninoy Aquino in August 1983. Despite public declarations of intent, the Government of the Philippines failed to conduct an adequate investigation. However, as Ann Marie Clark has subsequently observed: ‘At that time there were no internationally standardized death investigations procedures. There was no external norm, therefore, that could be used as a basis for criticism when governments failed to implement proper investigation of political killings in a case like the death of Aquino’

Ultimately, the Protocol was prepared by a group of legal and forensic experts coordinated by the Minnesota International Lawyers Committee for Human Rights (now The Advocates for Human Rights), in collaboration with the Science and Human Rights Program of the American Association for the Advancement of Science.

In several resolutions, the UN Commission for Human Rights mandated the OHCHR to update the Protocol. These resolutions were later quoted by the Human Rights Council in resolutions on forensic genetics and human rights.

In 2014 the Special Rapporteur on summary executions, Christof Heyns, began a process of consulting relevant experts and, in collaboration with OHCHR and UNODC, bringing together a large group that would ultimately participate in the revision of the Minnesota Protocol. In 2015, in his report to the General Assembly, he noted that ‘[t]he extent of the continued reliance on the Manual in international jurisprudence and by national legal entities emphasizes the need for the document to be up to date and comprehensive. It is to be expected that if the document is more up to date, it will more often and more readily serve as a guide.’

In 2016, two Working Groups, and a large international Advisory Panel undertook the revision, including with reference to two stakeholder consultations. As with the original version, the authority of the document relied upon the expertise of these drafting and review groups. Certain individuals had been involved in the processes of drafting both the original and the revised texts. The finalized document was presented to the OHCHR in July 2016, and published in May 2017.

== Uses of the Protocol ==
Announcing its release, the UN High Commissioner on Human Rights highlighted that ‘Proper investigations into suspicious deaths are an integral part of the protection of the right to life’

Regional human rights courts have referred to the Manual in reaching findings on the inadequacy of investigations into suspicious deaths. National courts have done the same when establishing guidelines for the investigation of killings by the police. The International Committee of the Red Cross (ICRC) relied on the Principles and the Manual in its Study on customary international humanitarian law: a contribution to the understanding and respect for the rule of law in armed conflict (2005) and in its Guidelines for Investigating Deaths in Custody (2013).

The Minnesota Protocol is often grouped with another document with a similar medico-legal and human rights purpose, the Istanbul Protocol, which is aimed at the documentation of torture. In his report to the UN General Assembly in 2014, the Special Rapporteur on torture, Juan E. Méndez, encouraged the use of both documents when performing forensic autopsies, and highlighted capacity gaps in forensic services as contributing to lack of accountability for serious human rights violations.

== Scope of use ==
The Minnesota Protocol aims to protect the right to life by promoting effective investigation of potentially unlawful death or suspected enforced disappearance. It sets common standards of performance and a shared set of principles and guidelines for States, as well as for institutions and individuals who play a role in investigations.

The Minnesota Protocol applies to investigations of all “potentially unlawful death”. This primarily includes situations where:

1. the death may have been caused by acts or omissions of the State, its organs or agents, or may otherwise be attributable to the State, in violation of its duty to respect the right to life;
2. the death occurred when a person was detained by, or was in the custody of, the State, its organs, or agents; or
3. the death occurred where the State may have failed to meet its obligations to protect life.

The Protocol makes clear that protecting the right to life means preventing the arbitrary deprivation of life, but also requires accountability for an arbitrary deprivation of life whenever it occurs. Therefore, in addition to their duties to respect and to protect the right to life, States must also investigate potentially unlawful death, ensure accountability and remedy violations. The Protocol states:

The duty to investigate is an essential part of upholding the right to life. […] Where an investigation reveals evidence that a death was caused unlawfully, the State must ensure that identified perpetrators are prosecuted and, where appropriate, punished through a judicial process. […] A failure to respect the duty to investigate is a breach of the right to life. Investigations and prosecutions are essential to deter future violations and to promote accountability, justice, the rights to remedy and to the truth, and the rule of law.

In addition to its scope, the Protocol also clearly establishes the “trigger” for the State's duty to investigate, namely where it knows or should have known of any potentially unlawful death, including where reasonable allegations of a potentially unlawful death are made. As the Protocol details, this includes all cases where the State has caused a death or where it is alleged or suspected that the State caused a death (for example, where law enforcement officers used force that may have contributed to the death) or where the State has failed to exercise due diligence to prevent a death at the hands of a third party. In all cases outside the conduct of hostilities in an armed conflict, this duty exists regardless of whether it is suspected or alleged that the death was unlawful.

The Protocol offers a particular note on the duty to investigate during the conduct of hostilities, which it highlights as a context that may provide practical difficulties for the application of much of the Protocol's content. All suspected war crimes must be investigated. But the Protocol also emphasizes that, where, during the conduct of hostilities, it appears that casualties have resulted from an attack, a post-operation assessment should be conducted to establish the facts, including the accuracy of the targeting.

More broadly, the Protocol also highlights that the State also has a duty to investigate all potentially unlawful death caused by private individuals, even if the State cannot be held responsible for failing to prevent such deaths.

The Protocol also establishes standards for what it calls the ‘Elements and Principles of Investigations’, broadly that they should be

- Prompt
- Effective and thorough
- Independent and Impartial
- Transparent

The Protocol is explicitly non-prescriptive with respect to investigative mechanisms, noting that the duty to investigate does not necessarily require one particular investigative mechanism in preference to another. States may use a wide range of mechanisms, as determined or suggested by domestic law and practice, as long as those mechanisms meet international law requirements.

== Conducting an investigation ==
The bulk of the Minnesota Protocol provides first strategies and principles and then detailed guidelines on practical steps that should be taken in an effective investigation. The overarching strategy of any investigation should be methodical and transparent, and all legitimate lines of inquiry should be pursued. An investigation may gather different types of material, not all of which will be used as evidence in a judicial proceeding. But all relevant materials or observations should be secured and logged.

The Protocol establishes that a set of operational and tactical processes for the investigation should also be designed. These should seek to establish significant facts, preserve relevant material and lead to the identification of all the parties involved, including by managing the following:

- Collection, analysis and management of evidence, data and materials
- Forensic examination of important physical locations, including the death/crime scene
- Family liaison
- Development of a victim profile
- Finding, interviewing and protecting witnesses
- International technical assistance
- Telecommunications and other digital evidence
- Financial issues
- Chronology of events

Particular sections are dedicated to processes for interviewing witnesses and for recovering human remains. The Protocol then provides a great deal of detail attesting both to the importance of, and practical guidance for, the identification of human remains.

Particular guidance is offered on the techniques for collecting and sampling different types of evidence, including the following:

- Human biological evidence
- Non-biological physical evidence
- Digital evidence
- Forensic accounting
- Soil/environmental samples

Investigation of potentially unlawful deaths will almost always be aided by the conduct of an autopsy. In a section setting out the general principles of an autopsy the Protocol provides an overview of the duties of a forensic doctor in relation to a death investigation, and then establishes the basic aims of autopsy will assist in fulfilling those duties. The aims of the autopsy, principally are:

- discover and record all the identifying characteristics of the deceased (where necessary);
- discover and record all the pathological processes, including injuries, present;
- draw conclusions about the identity of the deceased (where necessary); and
- draw conclusions as to the cause of death and factors contributing to death.

In general, the Protocol establishes in various places the requirement of professional ethics for investigators, including forensic doctors. It highlights that any forensic doctor involved in an investigation has responsibilities to justice, to the relatives of the deceased, and more generally to the public. Whether or not they are employed by the police or the State, forensic doctors must understand their obligations to justice (not to the police or the State) and to the relatives of the deceased, so that a true account is provided of the cause of death and the circumstances surrounding it.

== See also ==
- Autopsy
- Coroner
- Istanbul Protocol
- Physicians for Human Rights
