= Leon Eisenberg =

American psychiatrist (1922–2009)

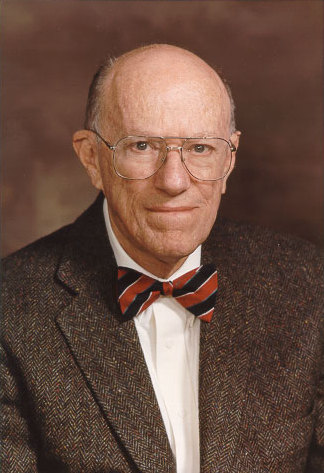
- Born: August 8, 1922; Philadelphia, Pennsylvania, US
- Died: September 15, 2009 (aged 87); Cambridge, Massachusetts, US
- Education: University of Pennsylvania
- Occupations: Child psychiatrist, social psychiatrist, medical educator
- Spouse(s): Ruth Harriet Bleier; Carola Eisenberg

Leon Eisenberg (August 8, 1922 – September 15, 2009) was an American child psychiatrist, social psychiatrist and medical educator who "transformed child psychiatry by advocating research into developmental problems".

He received both his BA and MD degrees from the Perelman School of Medicine at the University of Pennsylvania.

He is credited with several "firsts" in medicine and psychiatry – in child psychiatry, autism, and the controversies around autism, randomized clinical trials (RCTs), social medicine, global health, affirmative action, and evidence-based psychiatry.

He served as Chairperson of the Johns Hopkins Hospital Department of Child and adolescent psychiatry and Harvard Medical School until his retirement in 1988. After retirement, he continued as The Maude and Lillian Presley Professor of Social Medicine, Psychiatry Emeritus, and in the Department of Global Health and Social Medicine of the Harvard Medical School in the Longwood Medical Area of Boston, until a few months before his death in 2009. Previously, he had taught at both the University of Pennsylvania and Johns Hopkins University. He was chief of psychiatry at both Johns Hopkins Hospital in Baltimore and the Massachusetts General Hospital in Boston during formative periods in psychiatry for each institution.

== Medical accomplishments ==
Eisenberg completed the first outcome study of autistic children in adolescence and recognized patterns of language use as the best predictor of prognosis. Of the two first studies of the outcome of infantile autism, he reported the American study in the American Journal of Psychiatry in 1956, and the UK study was reported in JCPP shortly afterward by Victor Lotter and Sir Michael Rutter. Eisenberg also studied and identified the use of rapid rea turn to school as the key treatment in the management of the separation anxiety in an underlying school phobia.

He was principal investigator (PI) on the first grant from the Psychopharmacology Branch of NIMH for RCTs in child psychopharmacology. From a concern for evidence-based care, well before the phrase was coined, he introduced randomized controlled trials (RCTs) in psychopharmacology and showed that "tranquillizing drugs were inferior to placebo in the treatment of anxiety disorders, whereas stimulant drugs were effective in controlling hyperactivity."

Eisenberg completed the first RCTs of psychiatric consultation to social agencies and the utility of brief psychotherapy in anxiety disorders. He published a forceful critique of Konrad Lorenz's instinct theory and established the usefulness of distinguishing "disease" from "illness". He has highlighted the environmental context as a determinant of the phenotype emerging from a given genotype, and from the late 1990s through 2006, he had been involved with developing conferences and resources for medical educators in various specialties that would help them incorporate into courses with their current and future students, the tidal wave of new information in genomics yet to puzzle future clinicians. This interest may have been encouraged by his stepson, Alan Guttmacher, then acting head of the National Human Genome Research Institute. For many decades, Eisenberg had criticized psychoanalysis from several platforms.

The scientific contributions of Eisenberg include:

- The first longitudinal follow-up of Leo Kanner's original cases of autism.
- A study that identified the roots of social phobia in parental anxiety.
- The first clinical trial in search of the effectiveness of psychiatric consultation in a social agency.
- The first randomized controlled trial in childhood psychopharmacology..
- The first randomized controlled trial of stimulant drugs in adolescents.
- The first randomized clinical trial of brief psychotherapy.
- A forceful critique of Lorenz's theory of instincts and imprinting.
- An early statement of the distinction between "disease" (what doctors deal with) and "illness" (what patients suffer).
- A widely cited critique of the oscillation of psychiatry between brain-centered and mind-centered that approaches arguing for the integration of the two.
- A synthesis of the evidence on the importance of training primary care physicians to recognize and treat depression.
- Papers that highlight molding the brain structure by social experience.
- Publications putting inheritance in an environmental context as a determinant of risk and resilience.
- Eisenberg is known as "the father of prevention science in psychiatry"

Eisenberg was proudest of the Diversity Lifetime Achievement Award he received in 2001 for his role in inaugurating affirmative action at HMS in 1968 and sustaining it as chairman of the Admissions Committee from 1969 to 1974. He regards that as his most important contribution to Harvard Medical School.

He and his wife, Carola B. Eisenberg, former dean of students, first at MIT, then at Harvard Medical School, had been active with Physicians for Human Rights, which as an organization received a Nobel Peace Prize in 1997 for its International Campaign to Ban Landmines.

In mid-2009 (June 22, 2009), a Leon Eisenberg Chair in Child Psychiatry was named at Children's Hospital Boston. The first chairholder of the Leon Eisenberg Professorship in Child Psychiatry is David R. DeMaso, MD, HMS Professor of Psychiatry and Psychiatrist-in-Chief at Children's Hospital Boston.

His autographical memoir was published posthumously by Acta Psychiatrica Scandinavica.

== Death ==
Eisenberg died of prostate cancer at his home in Cambridge, Massachusetts on September 15, 2009.

== Later autobiographical reflections: "Were We Asleep at the Switch?" ==
Eisenberg wrote a 'mini-autobiography' which he named "Were We Asleep at the Switch?". Eisenberg suggested that a switch from 'mind' to 'body' has taken place in psychiatry as a discipline, which led to overuse of medication. He also argued that, while medical scientists were worrying about the tedious science at the base of medical practice and healthcare decisions for the general public, "money" and monied interests had been making de facto decisions for the populace about how things that affected them deeply were going to be done. In this view, the overwhelming impact of economic considerations over emerging bodies of expert knowledge may have rendered and might continue to render futile the professional contributions of many brilliant, timely, and concerned working scientists.

A 2012 article in the German weekly publication Der Spiegel gives an account of an interview Eisenberg gave in 2009, seven months before his death. It quotes him as saying, "ADHD is a prime example of a fabricated disease... The genetic predisposition to ADHD is completely overrated." Instead of prescribing a 'pill', Eisenberg said, psychiatrists should determine whether there are psychosocial reasons that could lead to behavioral problems.

== Earliest papers ==
- Bazett H. C. Love L. Newton L. Eisenberg L. Day R. & Forster R. (1948) Temperature changes in blood flowing in arteries and veins in man Pub. J Appl Physiol pp. 1:3-19.
- Eisenberg L. (1953) Treatment of the emotionally disturbed pre-adolescent child Pub. Proc Child Research Clinic Woods Schools 35:30-41.
- Kanner L. & Eisenberg L. (1955) Child psychiatry; mental deficiency Pub. American Journal of Psychiatry, 111:520-523.
- Eisenberg, L. (1956), The autistic child in adolescence Pub. American Journal of Psychiatry 112, pp. 607–612. Reprinted in: Alexander et al., eds. Psychopathology Cambridge: Harvard University Press, 1959.
- Kanner L. & Eisenberg L. (1956) Child psychiatry; mental deficiency Pub. Am J Psychiat, 112:531-534.
- Kanner, L. & Eisenberg L. (1956) Early Infantile Autism 1943–1955 Pub. American Journal of Orthopsychiatry 26, pp. 55–65. Reprinted in: Alexander et al., eds. Op. cit. Reprinted in Psychiat. Res. Repts. 1957 (April), American Psychiatric Assn., pp. 55–65.
- Eisenberg L. (1956) The parent-child relationship and the physician Pub. AMA J Dis of Children, 91:153-157.
- Eisenberg L. (1956) Dynamic considerations underlying the management of the brain-damaged child Pub GP, 14:101-106.
- Glaser K & Eisenberg L. (1956) Maternal deprivation Pub. Pediatrics, 18:626-642.
- Kanner L & Eisenberg L. (1957) Child psychiatry: mental deficiency Pub. Am J Psychiat, 113:617.
- Eisenberg L. (1957) Psychiatric implications of brain damage in children Pub. Psychiatric Quarterly, 31:72-92.
- Eisenberg L. (1957) Progress in neuropsychiatry Pub. J Ped, 51:334-349.
- Eisenberg L. (1957) The course of childhood schizophrenia Pub. Arch Neurol Psychiat, 78:69-83.
- Kanner L. & Eisenberg L. (1957) Childhood problems in relation to the family Pub. Pediatrics, 20:155-164.
- Eisenberg L. (1957) The fathers of autistic children Pub. American Journal of Orthopsychiatry, 27:715-724.
- Kanner L. & Eisenberg L. (1958) Child psychiatry; Mental Deficiency Pub. Am J Psychiat, 114:609-615.
- Eisenberg L. (1958) School phobia: a study in the communication of anxiety Pub. Am J Psychiat, 114:712-718. Reprinted in: Trapp EP and Himmelstein P, eds. Readings on the exceptional child. New York: Appleton, 1962. Reprinted in: Bobbs-Merrill Reprint Series in the Social Sciences, 1966, p. 433. Reprinted in: Davids A, ed. Issues in abnormal child psychology. California: Brooks/Cole, 1973.
- Eisenberg L. (1958) Discussion: roundtable symposium on desegregation (segregation-integration) Pub. Am J Orthopsychiat, 28:33-35.
- Eisenberg L. (1958) An evaluation of psychiatric consultation service for a public agency Pub. Am J Public Health, 48(6):742-749.
- Eisenberg L. (1958) Emotional determinants of mental deficiency Pub. Arch Neurol Psychiat, 80:114-121.
- Eisenberg L. (1958) Diagnosis, genesis, and clinical management of school phobia Pub. Ped Clin North America, 645–666.
- Eisenberg L. Marlowe B. & Hastings M. (1958) Diagnostic services for maladjusted foster children: An orientation toward an acute need Pub. Am J Orthopsychiat, 28(4):750-763.
- Kanner L & Eisenberg L. (1959) Child psychiatry and mental deficiency Pub. Am J Psychiat, 115:608-611.
- Eisenberg L. Ascher E. & Kanner L. (1959) A clinical study of Gilles de la Tourette's disease (maladie des tics) in children Pub. Am J Psychiat, 115:715-523.
- Eisenberg L. (1959) Office evaluation of specific reading disability in children Pub. Pediatrics, 23(5):997-1003.
- Rodriguez A, Rodriguez M, & Eisenberg L. (1959) The outcome of school phobia: a follow up study Pub. Am J Psychiat, 116:540-544.
- Eisenberg L. (1959) The pediatric management of school phobia Pub. J Pediatrics, 55(6):758-766.
- Eisenberg L. (1960) Child psychiatry; mental deficiency Pub. Am J Psychiat, 116:604.
- Eisenberg L. (1960) Conceptual problems in relating brain and behavior Pub. Am J Orthopsychiat, 30:37-48.
- Cytryn L. Gilbert A. & Eisenberg L. (1960) The effectiveness of tranquilizing drugs plus supportive psychotherapy in treating behavior disorders of children Pub. Am J Orthopsychiat, 30:113-129.
- Eisenberg L. (1960) The challenge of change Pub. Child Welfare, 39:11-18.
- Lesser L. Ashenden B. Debuskey M. & Eisenberg L. (1960) A clinical study of anorexia nervosa in children Pub. Am J Orthopsychiat, 30:572-580.
- Eisenberg L. and Gruenberg E. (1961) The current status of secondary prevention in child psychiatry Pub. Am J Orthopsychiat, 31:355-367.
- Eisenberg L. Gilbert A. Cytryn L. & Molling PA. (1961) The effectiveness of psychotherapy alone and in conjunction with perphenazine and placebo in the treatment of neurotic and hyperkinetic children Pub. Am J Psychiat, 117:1088-1093.
- Bahn AK. Chandler CA. & Eisenberg L. (1961) Diagnostic and demographic characteristics of patients seen in outpatient psychiatric clinics for an entire state (Maryland): implications for the psychiatrist and the mental health program planner Pub. Am J Psychiat, 117:769-777.
- Eisenberg L. (1961) The strategic deployment of the child psychiatrist in preventive psychiatry Pub. J Child Psychol Psychiat. 1961; 2:229-241. Reprinted in: Proc III World Congress on Psychiatry. Montreal, pp. 280–284.
- Eisenberg L. (1961) Child psychiatry; mental deficiency 1960 Pub. Am J Psychiat, 117:601-604.
- Eisenberg L. Landowne E. Wilner D. & Imber S. (1962) The use of teacher ratings in a mental health study: a method for measuring the effectiveness of a therapeutic nursery program Pub. Am J Pub Health, 52:18-28.
- Eisenberg L. (1962) The sins of the fathers: urban decay and social pathology Pub. Am J Orthopsychiatry.32:5-17. Presented as lecture at 55th Annual Meeting of The Massachusetts Association for Mental Health, June 4, 1968.
- Bahn A. Chandler C. & Eisenberg L. (1962) Diagnostic characteristics related to services in psychiatric clinics for children Pub. Milbank Mem Fund Quart, 40:289-318.
- Molling P. Lockner A. Sauls R. & Eisenberg L. (1962) Committed delinquent boys: The impact of perphenazine and placebo Pub. Arch Gen Psychiatry, 1:70-76.
- Eisenberg L. (1962) Preventive psychiatry Pub. Annu Rev Med, 13:343-360.
- Eisenberg L. (1962) Child psychiatry; mental deficiency Pub. Am J Psychiatry, 118:600-605.
- Eisenberg L. (1962) Possibilities for a preventive psychiatry Pub. Pediatrics, 30:815-828.
- Eisenberg L. (1962) If not now, when? Pub. Am J Orthopsychiatry.32:781-793. Reprinted in: Canada's Mental Health Suppl #36, April 1963. Reprinted in: World Mental Health. 1963; 5:48-64. Reprinted in: David HP, ed. International Trends in Mental Health. New York: McGraw Hill, 1965. Reprinted in: Child and Family. 1965(1); 4:84-91.
- Eisenberg L. Lachman R. Molling P. Lockner A. Mizelle J. & Conners K. (1963) A psychopharmacologic study in a training school for delinquent boys Pub. Am J Orthopsychiatry, 33:431-447.
- Oleinick M. Bahn A. Eisenberg L. & Lilienfeld A. (1966) Early socialization experiences and intrafamilial environment Pub. Archives of General Psychiatry, 15:344-353.

== Select publications ==
- Eisenberg, L. (Jan 1966) Can Human Emotions Be Changed? Pub. Bulletin of the Atomic Scientists, p. 29
- Eisenberg L. (1967) Clinical considerations in the psychiatric evaluation of intelligence Pub. Zubin J and Jervis GA, Eds. Psychopathology of mental development. New York: Grune & Stratton :502 513
- Eisenberg L. (1967) Social class and individual development In: Robert W. Gibson, Ed. Crosscurrents in Psychiatry and Psychoanalysis. Philadelphia and Toronto: J.B. Lippincott, London: Pitman Medical. [Cited (1981) in Sir Michael Rutter's Maternal Deprivation Reassessed Pub. Penguin Modern Psychology.]
- Eisenberg L. (1968) The social development of human intelligence Pub. Harvard Medical Alumni Bulletin, 43:2-7; (reprinted 1969) in H. Freemen, Ed. Progress in Mental Health. Churchill.
- Eisenberg L, Berlin, CI, Dill A. and Frank S. (December 1968) Class and race effects on the intelligibility of monosyllables Pub. Child Development, 39(4):1077-1089
- Eisenberg L. (1968) Au-dela de l'heridite: le test de l'evolution Pub. La Psychiatrie de l'Enfant, 11:572-588
- Eisenberg L. (November 1968) The interaction of biological and experiential factors in schizophrenia Pub. Journal of Psychiatric Research, 6:403-409
- Eisenberg L. (April 1969) Child psychiatry: the past quarter century Pub. American Journal of Orthopsychiatry, 39(3):389-401 Reprinted in: Davids A, Ed. Issues in abnormal child psychology. California: Brooks/Cole, 1973
- Koupernik C. & Eisenberg L. (1969) Réflexions sur l'autisme infantile (1943–1969) [Reflections on infantile autism (1943–1969)]. Confrontations Psychiatriques (Psychiatric Confrontations), 2(3):31-55
- Conners C., Rothschild G. Eisenberg L. Schwartz L. & Robinson E. (August 1969) Dextroamphetamine sulfate in children with learning disorders Pub. Archives of General Psychiatry, 21:182-190
- Rutter M. Lebovici S. Eisenberg L. Sneznevskij A. V. Sadoun R. Brooke E. & Lin T. Y. (December 1969) A triaxial classification of mental disorders in childhood Pub. Journal of Child Psychology and Psychiatry, 10:41-61 [Cited (1981) in Sir Michael Rutter's Maternal Deprivation Reassessed Penguin Modern Psychology
- Eisenberg, L. (1972) The Human Nature of Human Nature Pub. Science Vol.176, p. 126
- Eisenberg L. (1976) Psychiatric intervention Pub. Scientific American, 229; 116 127. Reprinted in: Humber JM and Almeder RF (Eds.) Biomedical Ethics and the Law. New York: Plenum, 1976. Reprinted in: Humber JM and Almeder RF (Eds.) Biomedical Ethics and the Law. 2nd Edition. New York: Plenum, 1979, pp. 109 120
- Eisenberg L. (December 1977) The perils of prevention: a cautionary note Pub. New England Journal of Medicine, 297:1230 1232
- Eisenberg L. (1980) Introduction. In: Marmor J. Psychiatry in transition. New York: Bruner/Mazel, 1974:v viii.
- Eisenberg L. Foreword. In: Thomas A and Chess S. The dynamics of psychological development. New York: Bruner/Mazel, ix xvii
- Eisenberg, L. (21 January 1986) Mindlessness and brainlessness in psychiatry The Eli Lilly Lecture, Winter Quarterly Meeting. Royal College of Psychiatrists, London Pub. British Journal of Psychiatry, 148:497-508
- Eisenberg, L. (1986) Rudolf Virchow: the physician as politician Pub. Medicine and War 2(4):243-250
- Eisenberg, L. (1990) From circumstance to mechanism in pediatrics during the Hopkins century Pub. Pediatrics 85:42-49
- Eisenberg, L. (Fall 1992) Subject and object in the grammar of medicine Pub. Penn Medicine 6:18-28
- Eisenberg L. (1995) The Social Construction of the Human Brain Pub. American Journal of Psychiatry 152: 1563–1575 Translated into Italian as: La Costruzione Sociale Del Cervello Umano Sapere 62(5):46-58, 1996.
- Eisenberg L. (1998)Nature, niche and nurture: the role of social experience in transforming genotype into phenotype. Pub. Academic Psychiatry, 22:213-222. Reprinted in Epidemiologia E Psichiatria Sociale 1999; 8:190-7. Translated as: Naturaleza, Entorno Y Crianza. El Papel de la Experiencia Social en la Transformacion del Genotipo en Fenotipo. Psychiatria Publica 1999; 11:139-46.
- Eisenberg L. (1999) Would cloned human beings be like sheep? Pub. New England Journal of Medicine, 340: 471–475. Reprinted in Klotzko AJ (Ed) (2001) The Cloning Source Book. N.Y., Oxford University Press pp. 70–79
- Eisenberg, L. (1999) Does social medicine still matter in an era of molecular medicine? Pub. Journal of Urban Health. 76: 164–175.
- Eisenberg, L. (1999) Whatever Happened to the Faculty on the Way to the Agora? Pub. Archives of Internal Medicine 125:251-6
- Eisenberg, L. (2000) Is Psychiatry More Mindful or Brainier than it was a Decade Ago? Pub. British Journal of Psychiatry 176.1-5
- Eisenberg, L. (2001) Good Technical Outcome, Poor Service Experience: A Verdict on Contemporary Medical Care? Pub. Journal of the American Medical Association 285:2639-2641; in reply. Journal of the American Medical Association 2001;286:1315.
- Eisenberg, L. (2002) From Molecules to Mind Pub. Eastern Mediterranean Health Journal 7:3
- Eisenberg, L. (2004) Social Psychiatry and the Human Genome: Contextualizing Heritability Pub. British Journal of Psychiatry, 184:101-103
- Eisenberg L. (2004) Letter to the Editor: Which Image for Lorenz? Pub. American Journal of Psychiatry. 161:1760
- Eisenberg L. (2007) When "ADHD" was "the Brain-Damaged Child Pub. Journal of Child and Adolescent Psychopharmacology 17(3):279-283
- Eisenberg L. cowritten with Javad Nurbakhsh & Hamideh Jahangiri (2019) Handbook of Psychiatry volume 29 ISBN 978-620-0-48143-6

Many of Eisenberg's books and papers have been translated into both European and non-European languages and have been widely cited.

== Papers written from consulting ==
Kleinman A, Eisenberg L, Desjarlais R (Eds) (1995), World Mental Health: Priorities and Problems in Low-Income Countries. New York: Oxford University Press.

- Translated into Spanish as: Salud Mental en el Mundo by I. Levav and R. Gonzalez and published by Organizacion Pan Americana del Salud, Washington, 1997.
- Translated into Italian as: [La Salute Mentale nel Mondo: Problemi e priorità La Salute Mentale nel Mondo: Problemi e priorità nelle popolazioni a basso reddito] by C. Belotti, G. de Girolamo, A. Fioritti, and V. Melaga and published by Il Mulino/Alfa tape, Bologna, Italy, 1998.
- Translated into Ukrainian 2001.

== Awards ==
- Sc. D. (Hon), University of Manchester, UK (1973)
- Sc. D. (Hon), University of Massachusetts, USA (1991)
- Theobald Smith Award, Albany Medical College (1979)
- Aldrich Richmond Award, American Academy of Pediatrics (1980)
- Dale Richmond Awards, American Academy of Pediatrics (1989)
- Samuel T. Orton Award, Orton Society (1980)
- Special Presidential Commendation, American Psychiatric Association (1992)
- Agnes Purcell McGavin Award for Prevention, American Psychiatric Association (1994)
- Distinguished Alumnus Award, University of Pennsylvania (1992)
- Camille Cosby Award, Judge Baker Children's Center (1994)
- Thomas W. Salmon Medal, New York Academy of Medicine (1995)
- Blanche F. Ittleson Memorial Award, American Orthopsychiatric Association (1996)
- Mumford Award, Columbia University School of Public Health (1996)
- Rhoda and Bernard Sarnat Prize for Outstanding Contributions to Mental Health, Institute of Medicine (1996)
- Award for Distinguished Contribution to Public Policy, SRCD (Society for Research in Child Development) (2003)
- Distinguished Service Award, American Psychiatric Association
- Walsh McDermott Medal, Institute of Medicine and the National Academies
- Benjamin Rush Medal and Lecture, American Psychiatric Institute (2006)
- Epidemiology Award, Harvard School of Public Health (2007)
- Harold Amos Diversity Award, Harvard Medical School (2008)
- Juan José López Ibor Award, World Psychiatric Association (WPA), granted at the World Congress of Psychiatry in Prague, The Czech Republic (2008)
- Honorary Fellow, Greek Society of Neurology and Psychiatry
- Honorary Fellow, Ecuadorian Academy of Neuroscience
- Honorary Fellow, Royal College of Psychiatrists (UK)

== Awards named for Eisenberg ==
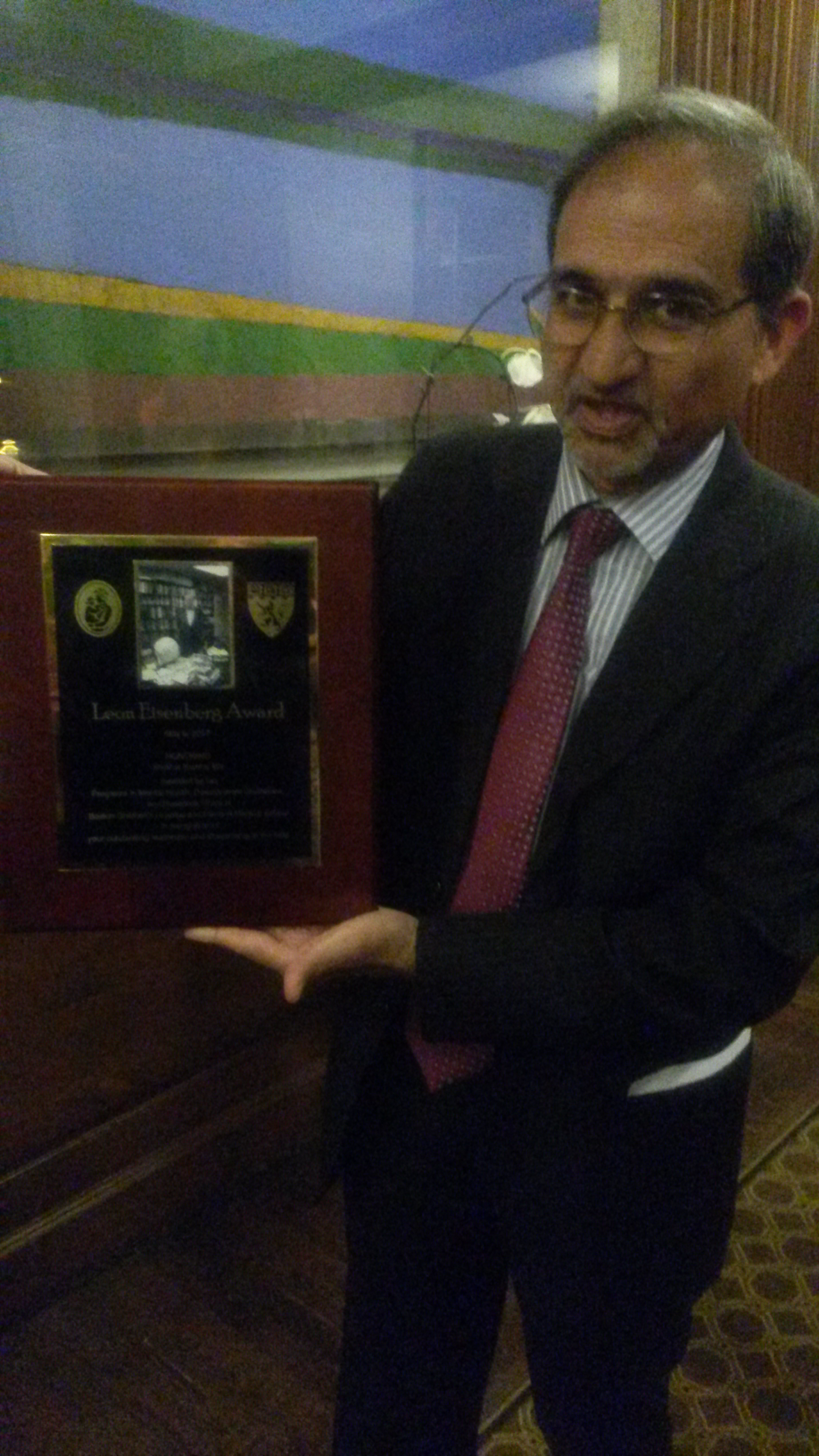
Shekhar Saxena

Several late-in-life and posthumous awards were developed to continue the legacy of Eisenberg.

- Leon Eisenberg Chair in Child Psychiatry, Children's Hospital Boston(named June 22, 2009)
- The Leon Eisenberg Award, conferred annually (in the Spring) by the Program in Mental Health and Developmental Disabilities (MH/DD), Children's Hospital Boston, beginning April 28, 2010.
- The Leon Eisenberg Scholarship (given to one deserving medical student at Johns Hopkins School of Medicine)
- The Leon and Carola Eisenberg Award from Physicians for Human Rights

== See also ==
- American Academy of Arts and Sciences (AmAcad)
- Autism rights movement
- Autism spectrum disorders in the media
- NARSAD
- NIMH
- Physicians for Human Rights
- Separation anxiety disorder
- Randomized controlled trial
- Overdiagnosis
- National Academy of Sciences
