= Robert E. Hall (physician) =

American physician (1924–1995)

Robert Elliott Hall
- Born: October 27, 1924; Pittsburgh, Pennsylvania, U.S.
- Died: October 6, 1995 (aged 70); New York City, U.S.
- Education: Harvard University Columbia University (MD, 1947)
- Occupations: obstetrician psychiatrist academic

Robert Elliott Hall (October 27, 1924 – October 6, 1995) was an American obstetrician, psychiatrist, academic and early advocate for the liberalization of abortion law in the United States. He founded the Association for the Study of Abortion with Alan F. Guttmacher in 1965, the first national abortion-rights organization in the country, and served as its chair. He and Guttmacher were considered the two most prominent physicians advocating for liberalization of abortion law in the US. Hall published many medical papers, as well as materials aimed at the general public, particularly relating to abortion law.

== Background ==
Hall was born in Pittsburgh, Pennsylvania on October 27, 1924. He studied medicine at Harvard University in Cambridge Mass and at Columbia University in NYC., graduating in 1947. Between 1948 and 1976, he worked as a physician at Columbia-Presbyterian Medical Center and taught at Columbia's College of Physicians and Surgeons. During this time he published more than 70 medical papers. He also wrote a popular 1963 book, Nine Months' Reading -- A Medical Guide for Pregnant Women.

After 1976, he spent most of the remainder of his life practicing psychiatry from his home in Riverdale, Bronx. He died of cancer at Calvary Hospital in The Bronx, on October 6, 1995, at the age of 70.

== Abortion activism ==
In 1963, Hall wrote an article for Columbia's alumni magazine arguing for the liberalization of abortion laws, citing the case of Sherri Finkbine, who was unable to obtain a legal abortion in the US after taking the drug Thalidomide, which was subsequently discovered to cause birth defects.

In 1965, Hall co-founded the Association for the Study of Abortion (ASA) with Alan F. Guttmacher, then president of Planned Parenthood. Hall served as the chairman of ASA, which funded research into abortion practices and law, and published educational materials aimed at the public.

In 1966, Hall wrote an article for Newsweek magazine titled "The Abortion Epidemic". In it, he estimated that around half of abortions performed in the country were done for reasons which were not permitted by the laws of most states: to preserve the mental health of the mother or because the child was likely to suffer from birth defects. He also warned that current practice effectively discriminated against poor mothers, for example by requiring multiple psychiatric consultations to establish whether an abortion would be permitted.

Initially Hall and ASA took the conservative position of advocating for "reform" of state abortion laws—for example by legalizing abortion in a wider range of cases of "medical necessity" beyond those which threatened the life of the mother—rather than "repeal" (i.e. legal abortion on demand). However, by early 1969, Hall had embraced the repeal position as viable, and ASA would provide legal support to the lawyers who argued the landmark 1973 Supreme Court case Roe v. Wade. The organization was dissolved after the court issued its decision in the case, finding that the right to choose an abortion was protected by a constitutional right to privacy.

Hall was criticized by some other abortion rights advocates for his view that abortions should be performed only in hospitals by specially-trained obstetricians.
