= Roy Lucas =

Roy Lucas may refer to:

- Roy Lucas (American football), American football coach
- Roy Lucas (lawyer) (1941–2003), legal theorist and abortion rights activist
