= Moscow Community Centre for LGBT+ Initiatives =

LGBT+ charity organisation in Russia

The Moscow Community Centre for LGBT+ Initiatives (MCC) is a non-profit organisation, founded in 2015, that provides social and humanitarian support and advocacy for LGBTQ+ community in Russia.

MCC staff and volunteers are involved in human rights work, promoting the recognition and equality of diverse sexual and gender identities, while challenging all forms of xenophobia and discrimination in the society. Since 2017, the organisation has collaborated with other Russian LGBT+ groups in the evacuation of victims of anti-gay purges in Chechnya.

Olga Baranova, a human rights activist supporting the LGBT+ community in Russia since 2012, became the first director of the MCC. The organisation's operations have also been directed by a human rights activist Tatyana Vinnichenko .

== Activities ==
The organisation engages in various forms of support for members of the LGBT+ community, including provision of:

- Psychological support and social adaptation.
- Legal support and education.
- Cultural and educational activities, including the Open-Art festival and discussion clubs.
- Emergency program, including evacuation and access to safe housing (shelters) and support for asylum seekers.

== Government Pressure and International Support ==
In 2022, the organisation was included in Russia's Ministry of Justice list of foreign agents in Russia. In 2023, the Russian Supreme Court' ban of the "LGBT movement" as "extremist" posed a threat of criminal prosecution for activists and made the organisation's activities in Russia increasingly difficult. Olga Baranova commented on the situation for Foreign Policy: "We’ve worked all these years just to be [out] and to be in the mainstream. And now we just say, ‘Okay, stop, stop, stop!'". She also described the risk for the activists

"Six years, it’s not a joke. ‘What is worth me going to prison for six years?’ Every person who’s doing something right now [in LGBTQ+ activism in Russia] has to answer this question these days."

As a result of the government pressure, the MCC closed its office in Moscow and transitioned entirely to online operations to ensure safety of the activists and members of the community.

Prominent international human rights organisations, such as Amnesty International and OutRight International, condemned these measures and broader repressive actions against LGBT+ advocacy in Russia. Outright International published a comment from Olga Baranova in their press release following the decision of the Russian Supreme Court: "This is a big blow for us as a community, and now it looks like any LGBT organization is extremist." They also reported that "The Moscow Community Center for LGBT Initiatives sought to participate in the case as an interested party, but the court rejected its application."

In 2025, the European Court of Human Rights (ECHR) ruled in favour of the Moscow Community Centre for LGBT+ Initiatives (MCC) and its director, Tatyana Vinnichenko, in a case challenging their designation as a foreign agent, finding the designation arbitrary and ordering the State to pay the applicants €10,250 (ten thousand two hundred and fifty euros) within three months.

The organisation continues to provide assistance through internet platforms and social media, maintaining support for and uniting the LGBT+ community in Russia despite ongoing pressure from the government.

== Awards ==
The organisation and its activists have received several international awards and recognitions for its work in advocating for LGBT+ rights, supporting those persecuted for their sexual identity, and implementing LGBT+ projects in Russia.

List of Awards
Award	Awarding Organisation	Description	Year	Source
Honorary Award of the Year	QX Gaygalan,QX (magazine), Sweden	Recognised for contribution to supporting LGBT+ initiatives.	2018	
Teddy Award, Activist Award	Berlin International Film Festival	Awarded to Olga Baranova for her efforts in rescuing LGBT+ individuals persecuted in Chechnya.	2020	
Special Recognition Award	The Advocates for Human Rights	For projects providing legal aid, psychosocial support, and art therapy, as well as helping victims in Chechnya since 2017.	2020	
Courage Under Fire Award	International Documentary Association	For organising assistance to refugees in securing safe housing and sanctuary in foreign countries.	2020	
