= Association for the Study of Abortion =

American organization

The Association for the Study of Abortion (ASA) was an American organization founded around 1965 (Note: Sources variously give ASA's founding year as either 1964 or 1965. Shaffer 1965 describes the ASA as an "outgrowth" of a committee founded in 1964, which may explain this discrepancy.) dedicated to the study of abortion and advocacy for the liberalization of abortion law. Its founding members included the obstetrician-gynecologists Alan F. Guttmacher (then president of Planned Parenthood) and Robert E. Hall, who served as the organization's initial chairman.

ASA funded research as well as educational material aimed at the public. It initially took a conservative approach to the reform of abortion law, though it later embraced the more radical cause of repeal, and provided support to the attorneys who argued the landmark Supreme Court case of Roe v. Wade in 1973. The organization was dissolved after the success of Roe v. Wade, which found that women had a constitutional right to an abortion.

ASA was founded in New York, but had a national focus, and was the only national-level abortion rights organization until the founding of the pro-repeal NARAL in 1969.

== Background ==
At the time of the organization's founding, all US states criminalized abortion, generally with the sole exception of those necessary to save the life of the mother. Since medical technology had mostly eliminated scenarios where abortion was required as a life-saving measure, the net effect was that legal abortions were almost never performed. Some states such as New Hampshire, New York, and California had seen attempts to reform their statute to increase access, for example, by adding allowances to preserve the physical or mental health of the mother, or for pregnancies resulting from rape or incest, but none had yet succeeded. These efforts had generally been led by (male) doctors, and it was not until the late 1960s that abortion rights would be taken up as a feminist cause.

== Founding and membership ==
ASA was founded in New York in February 1965 as the Association for Humane Abortion, but voted to change its name to the "Association for the Study of Abortion" the following month. It grew out of the Committee for a Humane Abortion Law, which was created in 1964 by the Westchester Ethical Society.

It maintained a voting membership of around 20, mostly consisting of doctors, lawyers, and other professionals.

== Goals and ideology ==
The organization's stated goals were to sponsor, collect, and analyse research of abortion and of public attitudes toward abortion, as well as to advocate for greater understanding of "the abortion problem" among the public.

Like most early abortion advocacy groups, the ASA initially took a conservative approach of advocating for the "reform" of abortion law—for example by legalizing abortion in a wider range of cases of "medical necessity" beyond those which threatened the life of the mother—rather than "repeal" (i.e. legal abortion on demand). Some members who disagreed with this approach would go on to found the more radical National Association for Repeal of Abortion Laws (NARAL) in 1969, including Lawrence Lader and Ruth Proskauer Smith. ASA would later come to embrace the repeal position by the time of Roe v. Wade.

== Activities ==
In 1966, ASA publicized the results of a nationwide poll they had conducted showing that an overwhelming majority of psychiatrists supported liberalizing abortion law, though less than a quarter supported complete repeal.

In 1968, the organization sponsored a research conference in Hot Springs, Virginia in which the "vacuum suction" method of abortion was introduced to American practitioners; its better safety profile would lead to it eventually replacing dilation and curettage as the standard method for first-trimester abortions.

A 1972 ASA memo issued by director Jimmye Kimmey has been cited by authors Linda Greenhouse and Reva B. Siegel as introducing the rhetoric of a "right to choose" (which would later morph into the label "pro-choice") among abortion rights activists. Kimmey specifically identified a need to find a counter to the "right to life" slogan which was being successfully employed by anti-abortion groups.

ASA supported the petitioners in the landmark 1973 Supreme Court case of Roe v. Wade. In particular, they connected the lawyers arguing the case with experts such as Harriet Pilpel, and helped coordinate the submission of 42 amicus curiae briefs from sympathetic organizations. They also funded legal scholarship by Cyril Means which was cited in the court's decision. ASA had also funded legal scholarship by Roy Lucas in the late 1960s which originated the theory followed by the Roe v. Wade decision: that a constitutional right to privacy (first discussed in the 1965 case Griswold v. Connecticut) protected a woman's right to choose an abortion. The organization ceased operations after the Roe v. Wade decision was handed down.
