= Carola B. Eisenberg =

American psychiatrist (1917–2021)

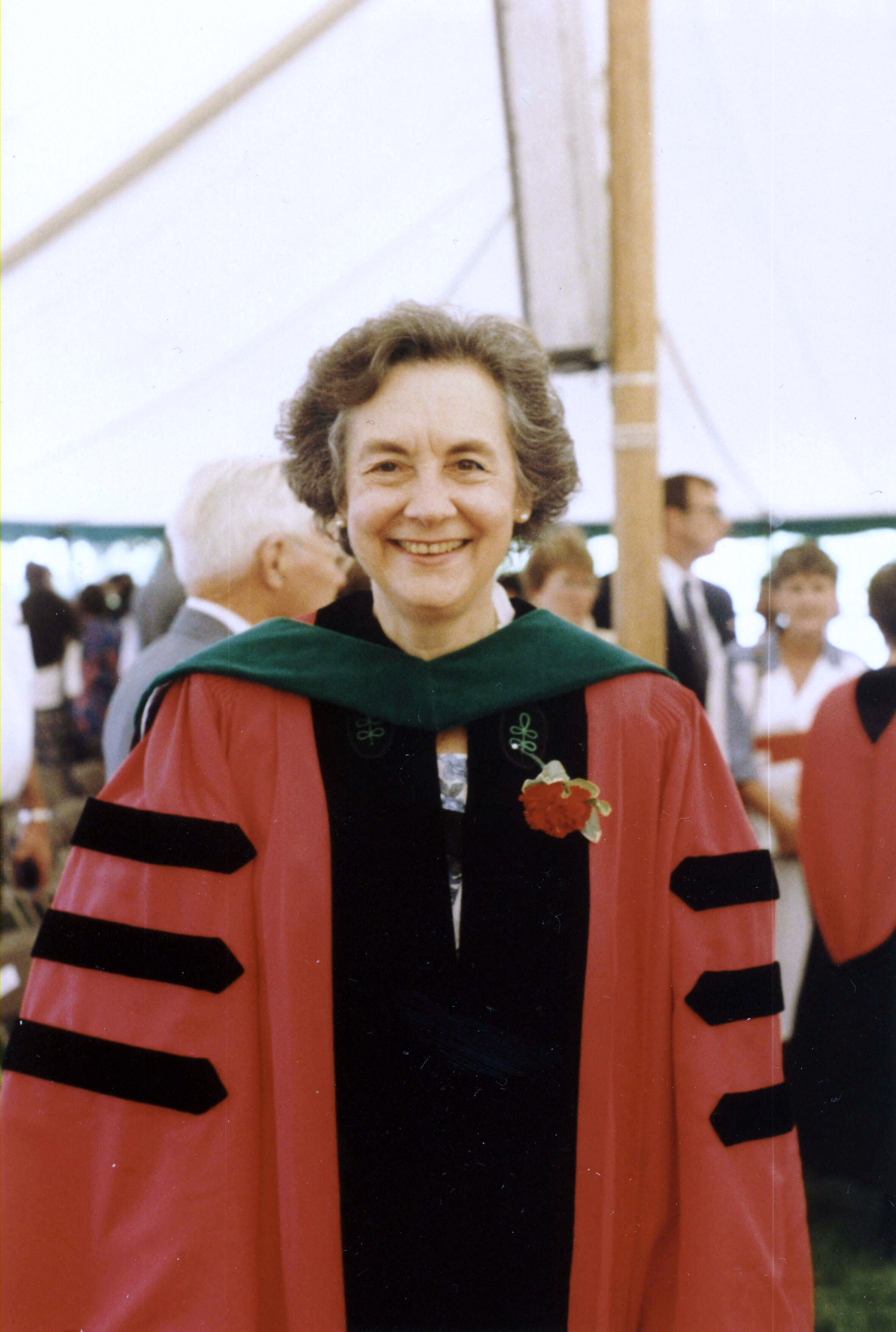
- Born: Carola Blitzman; September 15, 1917; Argentina
- Died: March 11, 2021 (aged 103); Lincoln, Massachusetts, U.S.
- Citizenship: Argentina, then U.S. (naturalized 1949)
- Occupations: Psychiatrist, child psychiatrist, medical educator
- Known for: Physicians for Human Rights
- Spouse(s): Manfred Guttmacher (deceased); Leon Eisenberg (deceased)
- Children: Alan Edward Guttmacher; Laurence Guttmacher

Carola Blitzman Eisenberg (September 15, 1917 – March 11, 2021) was an Argentine-American psychiatrist who became the first woman to hold the position of Dean of Students at the Massachusetts Institute of Technology. From 1978 to 1990, she was the dean of student affairs at Harvard Medical School (HMS). She was a long-time lecturer in the Department of Global Health and Social Medicine at HMS (formerly the Department of Social Medicine). She was also both a founding member of Physicians for Human Rights and an honorary psychiatrist with the Massachusetts General Hospital in Boston. After retiring, she was involved in human rights work through Physicians for Human Rights, the Institute for Healthcare Improvement, and elsewhere. She turned 100 in September 2017 and died in Lincoln, Massachusetts, in March 2021 at the age of 103.

== Life and career ==
Eisenberg was a native Argentine and the daughter of Teodora (née Kahan) and Bernardo Blitzman (Jewish emigrants from Ukraine and Russia, respectively). She was a co-founder of Physicians for Human Rights and latterly its vice president and chair of its Asylum Committee. Her dissertation, "A Histological Study of Tay–Sachs disease," was presented in 1944 for her medical degree at the University of Buenos Aires in Argentina. She was also a 1935 graduate of the School of Psychiatric Social Work in Hospicio De Las Mercedes (Hospice of the Virgin of Mercy) in Argentina. After receiving her medical degree and completing her psychiatric training at the Hospicio De Las Mercedes, she emigrated to the United States and became fellow in child psychiatry at the Johns Hopkins Hospital in Baltimore, Maryland.

She was licensed to practice psychiatry in Maryland (1955) and Massachusetts (1971). Eisenberg served on the faculty of the Johns Hopkins Medical School from 1958 to 1967 before becoming a staff psychiatrist at the Student Health Service of the Massachusetts Institute of Technology (MIT). From 1972 to 1978, she served as Dean of Students at MIT—first woman to occupy that position and the first to serve on the Academic Council, its highest academic governing authority. In 1978, after leaving MIT, she was appointed Dean for Student Affairs at Harvard Medical School, where she served until 1990. From 1990 to 1992, she was the director of the International Programs for Medical Students of the school.

Throughout her career, she consulted with the Pan American Health Organization (PAHO) (1979); Swarthmore College (1984); the Mental Health Division of the World Health Organization (1985); the Committee on Human Rights and Medical Practice of the American College of Physicians (1989–1993); the National Institutes of Health (1992, 1995–1998); Office of the Surgeon General, Department of Health and Human Services (1992); and the National Research Council of the National Academy of Sciences and National Academy of Engineering (1992–1996).

She was a member of human rights missions to El Salvador, Chile, and Paraguay. She founded and served as Vice President of Physicians for Human Rights USA–headquartered in Cambridge, Massachusetts–and as President of the Examiners Club of Boston. She served on the Committee on Women in Science and Engineering of the National Research Council of the National Academy of Sciences, and was a member of the advisory committee to the Office of Research on Women's Health of the National Institutes of Health.

Eisenberg was active in both the Cambridge-based Institute for Healthcare Improvement and the Oral History Project of the Foundation for the History of Women in Medicine.

She was the widow of Leon Eisenberg, the Presley Professor of Social Medicine and professor of psychiatry emeritus in the Department of Global Health and Social Medicine of Harvard Medical School. She was also a lecturer in the Department of Global Health & Social Medicine. As the widow of Manfred Guttmacher (brother of Alan Frank Guttmacher), she was also the mother of Laurence Guttmacher, a clinical professor of psychiatry and medical humanities at the University of Rochester School of Medicine, and Alan Guttmacher, who succeeded Francis Sellers Collins (a past Director of the National Institutes of Health) as Acting Director of the National Human Genome Research Institute at the National Institutes of Health. From 1 December 2009, she was Acting Director, then Director, of the Eunice Kennedy Shriver National Institute of Child Health and Human Development.

== Timeline of life and achievements ==
- Born: Buenos Aires, Argentina
- Naturalized U.S. Citizen
- Johns Hopkins Hospital, Psychiatrist, Outpatient Department, July 1947 – June 1950
- Dept. of Education, City of Baltimore, Consultant in Psychiatry, July 1951 – June 1953
- University of Maryland, Instructor in Psychiatry, July 1955 – June 1959
- Park School of Baltimore, Consultant in Psychiatry, Baltimore, July 1957 – June 1967
- Johns Hopkins Medical School
  - Instructor in Psychiatry and Pediatrics, July 1958 – June 1966
  - Assistant Professor of Psychiatry and Pediatrics, July 1966 – October 1967
- Sheppard Pratt Hospital, Consultant in Psychiatry, July 1960 – August 1967
- Private Practice of Child and Adolescent Psychiatry, Baltimore, July 1955 – August 1967
- Massachusetts Institute of Technology
  - Staff Psychiatrist, 1968 – June 1972
  - Dean for Student Affairs, July 1972 – June 1978
- Massachusetts General Hospital, Consultant in Psychiatry, July 1968–?
- McLean Hospital, Consultant in Psychiatry, July 1969 – June 1992
- Harvard Medical School, 1968–?
  - Lecturer in Psychiatry, July 1968 – June 1996
  - Lecturer in Social Medicine, July 1996 – 2008
  - Dean for Student Affairs, July 1978 – June 1990
  - Director, International Programs for Medical Students, July 1990 – June 1992
- Private Practice of Psychiatry, Boston, 1992–2006
- Through PHR, Co-recipient of Nobel Peace Prize for PHR's International Campaign to Ban Landmines, 1997
- FHWIM Morani Renaissance Woman Award, 2002
- Lifetime Achievement Award, Massachusetts Psychiatric Society, 2005
- Human Rights Award, American Psychiatric Association (APA), 2005
- George Eastman Award, University of Rochester, 2009
- Distinguished Lifetime Service Award, American Psychiatric Association, 2009.

== Prizes and awards ==
- Physicians for Human Rights, which she co-founded, was the 1997 co-recipient, with Jody Williams, of the Nobel Peace Prize for its International Campaign to Ban Landmines.
- Massachusetts Psychiatric Association – 2000
- Morani Renaissance Woman Award to "honor an outstanding woman physician or scientist in North America", Foundation for the History of Women in Medicine, Drexel University College of Medicine, 2002. Current List of Award Winners
- Lifetime Achievement Award, Massachusetts Psychiatric Society, 2005.
- APA Human Rights Award, American Psychiatric Association, 2005. Current List of Award Winners
- George Eastman Award, University of Rochester (UR's highest Award, given annually – most years), 2009
- Distinguished Lifetime Service Award “for contributions in addressing mental health in college and medical students and for distinguished leadership as an international human rights advocate”, American Psychiatric Association, San Francisco, 2009.
- The Leon and Carola Eisenberg Award from Physicians for Human Rights

== Other honors ==
- HMS Mention of the $25,000 Prize in honor of Dr. Carola Eisenberg, former HMS Dean of Students.
- "Profiles of Remarkable Women" included in New dimensions in women's health By Linda Lewis Alexander, Judith H. Larosa, Helaine Bader, Susan Garfield.
- On April 28, 2010, Dr. Carola Eisenberg presented the first annual Leon Eisenberg Award for the Program in Mental Health and Developmental Disabilities (MH/DD), Children's Hospital Boston. She was a Guest of Honor each year at the annual Eisenberg Award presentation dinner, held at the MIT Faculty Club in Cambridge, Massachusetts.
- On October 10, 2010, A Tribute to Dr. Carola Eisenberg: Founding Board Member, Visionary Soul, Harvard Faculty Club, Cambridge, MA. Sponsored by Physicians for Human Rights, of which she was a Founding Member.
- Dr. Carola Eisenberg has been an Honorary Psychiatrist with the Massachusetts General Hospital (MGH), for a very long time. (start date uncertain)

== Boards ==
- American Psychiatric Association (Life Fellow): Council on Emerging Issues, 1974–79; Committee on International Abuse of Psychiatry and Psychiatrists, 1991–94; Committee on Human Rights, 1994; vice chair, Council on International Affairs, 1995–98
- American Orthopsychiatric Association (Life Fellow); program committee, 1967–70
- Foundation for the History of Women in Medicine, board of directors, dates?
- Center for the History of Medicine, Harvard Medical School, Women's History Committee, dates?
- Physicians for Human Rights (PHR), where she was a Co-founder (not confounder): Vice President, 1990–1999; chair, Asylum Network, 2000–?

== Other affiliations ==
- DRCLAS – the David Rockefeller Center for Latin American Studies
- American Psychiatric Association (Life Fellow): Council on Emerging Issues, 1974–79; Committee on International Abuse of Psychiatry and Psychiatrists, 1991–94; Committee on Human Rights, 1994; vice chair, Council on International Affairs, 1995–98
- American Orthopsychiatric Association (Life Fellow): Program Committee, 1967–70
- Association for Adolescent Psychiatry
- Association of American Medical Colleges
- Massachusetts Medical Society (Fellow)
- Massachusetts Psychiatric Society, Inc. (Council)
- Aesculapian Club of Harvard Medical School
- American Association of University Professors
- American Women's Medical Society
- American Association for the Advancement of Science
- American Association of University Women
- Association of Women in Science, Inc.
- Examiners Club, Boston; president, 1992–2001
- Massachusetts General Hospital (MGH), Honorary Psychiatrist, 19??–20??)
- Institute for Healthcare Improvement (IHI), Cambridge, MA

== Bibliography ==
- Eisenberg, C. Similarities and Differences Between Men and Women as Students. J. Amer. Med. Women's Assoc. 1981:35–36, 48–50.
- Eisenberg, C. Honduras: Mental Health Awareness Changes a Community. World Health Forum, I (1,2):72–77, 1980.
- Eisenberg, C. Caring. Harvard Medical Alumni Bulletin, Vol. 55:16–17, 48–49, 1981 (summer).
- Eisenberg, C. Women as Physicians. Journal of Medical Education, Vol. 58, 534–541, July 1983.
- Eisenberg, C; Halperin, D; Hargreaves, A; Hubbard, F; Mittleberger, J; Palmisano, J; Stanbury, J (1983). "Health and human rights in El Salvador". The New England Journal of Medicine. 308 (17): 1028–9. doi:10.1056/NEJM198304283081713. PMID 6835310.
- Eisenberg, C. Mental Health and the College Student. Mental Health and the Schools, S. Leung (ed.) Vancouver, University of British Columbia Press, 1985.
- Eisenberg, C., Foreword to a Student-to-Student Guide to Medical School by R.W. Betcher, M.D. Little, Brown and Co., Boston 1985.
- Eisenberg, C (1986). "It is still a privilege to be a doctor". The New England Journal of Medicine. 314 (17): 1113–4. doi:10.1056/NEJM198604243141710. PMID 3960083. Reprinted in: The Advisor, 6:18-19, 1986. Reprinted in: On Doctoring: Stories, Poems, Essays. Edited by R. Reynolds and J. Stone. Simon and Schuster, N.Y., 1991; 2nd Edition 1996, 3rd Edition 2002. Commentary on Eisenberg's lead place in volume.
- Eisenberg, C. The Stresses of Beginning Teaching. Journal of the Harvard-Danforth Center, 2:17, 1987 (January)
- Geiger, J; Eisenberg, C; Gloyd, S; Quiroga, J; Schlenker, T; Scrimshaw, N; Devin, J (1989). "A new medical mission to El Salvador". The New England Journal of Medicine. 321 (16): 1136–40. doi:10.1056/NEJM198910193211629. PMID 2797078.
- Eisenberg, C (1989). "Medicine is no longer a man's profession. Or, when the men's club goes coed it's time to change the regs". The New England Journal of Medicine. 321 (22): 1542–4. doi:10.1056/NEJM198911303212210. PMID 2811973.
- Eisenberg, C. Matters of Faith: Students Follow Their Own Course. Harvard Medical Alumni Bulletin, 63:20-23,1990.
- Eisenberg, C (1991). "Affirmative action for women and promotion of academic excellence". Academic Medicine. 66 (11): 678–9. doi:10.1097/00001888-199111000-00008. PMID 1747176.
- Eisenberg, C. Confidentiality in Psychotherapy: The case of Anne Sexton. (Letters to the Editor) New England Journal of Medicine, 325(20):1451, 1991. 1
- Women's Rights: The Coming Tidal Wave NIH Conference on Women in Biomedical Careers: Dynamics of Change: Strategies for the 21st Century Introductory Remarks June 11, 1992 Pooks Hill Marriott Hotel Bethesda, Maryland, reprinted in Journal of Women's Health. 1992 (Fall);1(3):235–237.
- "Landmines: A Deadly Legacy" in Landmines by Arms Project (Human Rights Watch), Physicians for Human Rights (U.S.) – co-author
- Health and Public Policy Committee by the Human Rights and Medical Practice Subcommittee (including Carola Eisenberg) (1995) The Role of the Physician and the Medical Profession in the Prevention of International Torture and in the Treatment of Its Survivors. Annals of Internal Medicine 15 April 1995;122(8):607–613.
- Eisenberg, C. (1995) The Struggle To Get There, In: Women in Biomedical Careers: Dynamics of Change: Strategies for the 21st Century. Full report of the workshop. Washington, National Institute of Health. Office for Research on Women's Health. NIH publication, No.95-3565; 18–21.
- Eisenberg, C. (1996). "Review of A New Prescription for Women's Health by Bernadine Healy". New England Journal of Medicine. 335: 1614–15. doi:10.1056/nejm199611213352119.
- Eisenberg, C. (1996) Women doctors: Where do we come from? What are we? Where are we going? Annals of Behavioral Science and Medical Education, 1996;3:1.
- Eisenberg, C. Mental Health of People and the Effects of War on Children. One World, One Language: Paving the Way to Better Perspectives for Mental Health. Edited by JJ Lopez-Ibor, F. Lieh-Mak, HM Visotsky and M. Maj. Hogrefe & Huber Publishers, Seattle, 1999, pp. 88–93.
- Eisenberg, C. (1999) Medicine and Human Rights. XI World Congress of Psychiatry Hamburg, Germany.
- Meeting the Nation's Needs for Biomedical and Behavioral Scientists: Committee on National Needs for Biomedical and Behavioral Research Personnel (1994)
- Institute of Medicine (IOM)
- Hannibal K, Eisenberg C, Heggenhougen HK (2004) Integrating Human Rights into Medical Education.
- Eisenberg, C. (2004) Giving Women a Break when Few Men Did. In Jerry Wiesner: Scientist, Statesman, Humanist: Memories and Memoirs by Jerome Bert Wiesner, Walter A. Rosenblith, Cambridge, Mass.: MIT Press ISBN 9780262182324 OCLC 52134711
- Open Letter from US Medical Leaders to 2004 Presidential Candidates (2004): "Leading Health Professional Sign-On Letter Regarding Antipersonnel Landmines to Presidential Candidates"
- Eisenberg, C. (2007) Women have improved the quality of medicine: a capsule history. In DeAngelis C (Editor), Women and Medicine: A Macy Foundation Conference. New York City: Josiah Macy, Jr. Foundation, pages 37–40.
- Eisenberg, C. (1999) Keynote Address – “Without Struggle There is No Progress” – at NIH-sponsored conference, "Achieving XXcellence in Health" – Advancing Women's Contributions to Science through Professional Societies. , cosponsored by National Institutes of Health in conjunction with National Institute of Environmental Health Sciences (NIEHS), and The American Society for Cell Biology, Washington, D.C., December 1999. pp. 21–23.

== Presentations at professional meetings ==
- "Juvenile Delinquency"—United Nations Conference on the Prevention of Delinquency, Tokyo, Japan, 1963
- "Psychiatric Disturbances in Adolescence"—Argentinian Congress of Child Psychiatry, Buenos Aires, Argentina, 1969
- "Psychiatric Services for College Students"—Aghia Sophia Children's Hospital, Athens, Greece, 1969
- "Sexual Problems in Adolescence"—Ciba Foundation Conference, University of Newcastle upon Tyne, England, 1971
- "Pediatric Psychiatry"—Tufts University Postgraduate Course, St. Maartens, 1971
- "Epidemiology of Adolescent Psychiatric Disorder"—Venezuelan Congress of Psychiatry, Mérida, 1975
- "Sexual Development"—Los Angeles County Pediatric Society, Palm Springs, California, 1975
- "Student Health"—Presentation to Venezuelan Ministry of Health, Caracas, 1976
- "Dual Career Marriages"—Yale University School of Medicine, New Haven, Connecticut, 1977 (April)
- "The Adjustment to College"—American Academy of Pediatrics, New York City, 1977 (November)
- "College Life"—Presentations to Massachusetts Institute of Technology Alumni Clubs, Mexico, London, Paris, 1980
- "Psychotherapy"—CIBA Foundation Conference, Glasgow University Medical School, 1978
- "Reproductive Freedom: The Responsibility of the Medical Profession"—Annual Meeting of the *Planned Parenthood Federation of America, Inc., San Diego, California, 1978
- "Mental Health in Honduras: The Community Approach"—World Health Forum, Tegulcigalpa, Honduras, 1979
- "Similarities and Differences Between Men and Women as Students"—Elizabeth Garrett Symposium at Johns Hopkins University School of Medicine, 1979
- "Medical Student Life"—Presentation to Harvard Surgical Alumni Group—Chicago, Illinois, 1979
- "The Response to Trauma"—CIBA Foundation Conference, Sheffield Medical School, UK, March 1980
- Commencement Address, Harvard Medical School, June 1981
- "Clinical Research Career for Women"—Chairwoman, National Institutes of Health, Bethesda, Maryland, 1984
- "Primary Health Care"—CIBA Foundation Conference, Nottingham Medical School, United Kingdom, November, 1984
- "A Career in Medicine: Is It Still Worth It?"—A.O.A. Lecture, Case Western Reserve University, April 1986
- Commencement Speech—Albert Einstein College of Medicine, May 1987
- "Medicine and Dental Medicine as Vocations of Service to Others"—Convocation, The University of Connecticut School of Medicine, August, 1987
- Commencement Speech—University of Vermont College of Medicine, May, 1988
- "College Mental Health"—Massachusetts General Hospital, Postgraduate Course, April 1989
- "The Pleasures of Medicine"—invited address, University of Rochester, March, 1990
- Symposium on Women in Medicine—invited address, University of North Carolina School of Medicine, Chapel Hill, April, 1991
- Participant, Women's Leadership Conference, Radcliffe College, Summer, 1991
- Co-Chair, NIH Conference: "Women in Biomedical Careers" 11 June 1992
- Plenary Speaker, Conference on Women in Math, Science and Engineering,
- A.A.A.S. and Women's College Coalition, 14 November 1992
- Keynote Speaker, 75th Anniversary of the Admission of Women
- Washington University School of Medicine, St. Louis, 8 October 1993
- Grand Rounds, Department of Pediatrics, University of Vermont: Physicians and Human Rights, 12 April 1995
- Plenary Address, Society for Behavioral Science and Medical Education, Naples, Florida, 7 October 1995
- Plenary Address, Conference on Women in Medicine, University of Rochester, 26 April 1996
- Keynote Speaker, White Coat Ceremony, New Jersey College of Medicine, Newark, 22 August 1996
- Keynote Speaker, White Coat Ceremony, College of Physicians and Surgeons, Columbia University, New York City, 23 August 1996
- Plenary Speaker, Children and War, World Congress of Psychiatry, Madrid, 28 August 1996
- Grand Rounds, Cambridge Hospital, 18 September 1996
- Leadership Conference, Radcliffe College, 14 December 1996
- Visiting Lecturer, University of Cape Town, South Africa, 17–28 March 1997: Human Rights and Health, War and Children, Women and Medicine
- Women's Leadership Project, Radcliffe College, September 1997, September 1998: Sessions on: careers; race and gender; leadership roles
- Speaker: The Effects of War on Children, XI International Congress of Pediatrics, The Netherlands, August 1998
- Physicians and Women's Rights, Center for Psychological Health, Radcliffe
- Grand Rounds Psychiatry, Strong Memorial Hospital, University of Rochester, February 1999
- Keynote Speaker: "Without Struggle, There Is No Progress", Achieving XXcellence in Science, cosponsored by National Institutes of Health in conjunction with National Institute of Environmental Health Sciences (NIEHS), and The American Society for Cell Biology, Washington, D.C., December 1999. pp. 21–23.
- Radcliffe Intellectual Renewal Conference: Protecting Human Rights: Whose Job Is It? Endicott Peabody Conference Center, June 15, 2001
- Macy Conference on Psychiatry. Toronto, Canada. October 2001
- Jonathan Mann Lecture, University of New Mexico School of Mexico, December 2001
- Human Rights and the Physician, University of Rochester School of Medicine, April 2002
- Rights and Responsibilities of Physicians, Bioethics Panel, 2004 Conference on International Health, MIT Hippocratic Society, Cambridge, MA, April 24–25, 2004.
- Commencement Address, University of Rochester School of Medicine, May 15, 2004.

== Other professional and academic lectures ==
- Women's Rights are the Key to Human Rights, 1999, CWPH Networking Breakfasts & Conferences, Center for Women's Professional Health. Lexington, MA
- Carola Eisenberg addresses Student PHR at Dartmouth College, March 2008

== Human rights missions (with PHR) ==
- El Salvador, January 1983
- Chile, July–August 1986
- Paraguay, May 1988
- El Salvador, June 1989
