= Istanbul Protocol =

UN guidelines for the documentation of torture

The Manual on Effective Investigation and Documentation of Torture and Other Cruel, Inhuman or Degrading Treatment or Punishment, commonly known as the Istanbul Protocol, is the first set of international guidelines for documentation of torture and its consequences. It became an official United Nations document in 1999; the most recent revision was in June 2022.

The Istanbul Protocol is intended to serve as a set of international guidelines for the assessment of persons who allege torture and ill treatment, for investigating cases of alleged torture, and for reporting such findings to the judiciary and any other investigative body.

== Background and purpose ==
The Manual on the Effective Investigation and Documentation of Torture and Other Cruel, Inhuman or Degrading Treatment or Punishment contains internationally recognised standards and procedures on how to recognise and document symptoms of torture so the documentation may serve as valid evidence in court.

As such, the Istanbul Protocol provides useful guidance for doctors and lawyers who want to investigate whether or not a person has been tortured and report the findings to the judiciary and any other investigative bodies.

A revised, expanded version was published by the UN in June 2022.

=== Non-binding document ===
The Istanbul Protocol is a non-binding document. However, international law obliges governments to investigate and document incidents of torture and other forms of ill-treatment and to punish those responsible in a comprehensive, effective, prompt and impartial manner, under the United Nations Convention Against Torture. The Istanbul Protocol is a tool for doing this.

The Istanbul Protocol was drafted by more than 75 experts in law, health and human rights during three years of collective effort. While the extensive work was initiated and coordinated by the Human Rights Foundation of Turkey (HRFT) and the Physicians for Human Rights USA (PHR USA), it involved more than 40 different organisations, such as the International Rehabilitation Council for Torture Victims.

The initial steps to work on a manual for the investigation and documentation of torture and other forms of ill treatment were taken at an international meeting in 1996 organised by the Turkish Medical Association and were inspired by the daily needs and practices experienced by the HRFT and the Society of Forensic Medicine Specialists in Turkey. In particular, the efforts to investigate the death of Baki Erdogan during custody became a decisive factor.

Baki Erdogan died during his 11th day in custody after having been transferred to the state hospital in Turkey. The autopsy and official forensic report stated that as a result of a 10-day hunger strike, he died of acute pulmonary oedema.

The Turkish Medical Association carried out an independent investigation and submitted an alternative medical report which disclosed numerous flaws in the autopsy and medical assessment made by the official medical experts.

The point of reference for the development of the alternative medical report was the Minnesota Protocol, the United Nations, Model Protocol for a Legal Investigation of Extra-Legal, Arbitrary and Summary Executions, Doc. ST/CSDHA/12, created in response to the conclusion of the Special Rapporteur on Summary or Arbitrary Executions, appointed by the Economic and Social Council in 1982.

The alternative report stressed that the official forensic investigation was deficient and false and not in accordance with the standards set out in the Minnesota Protocol. Furthermore, in light of the collected evidence and other findings, the cause of death was determined to be Adult Respiratory Distress Syndrome (ARDS), a result of the use of torture.

Upon finalisation of the Istanbul Protocol in 1999, an article on the Protocol was published in the international medical journal The Lancet.

The Istanbul Protocol is published by the Office of the UN High Commissioner for Human Rights in its Professional Training Series in the six official UN languages.

=== International recognition of the Istanbul Protocol ===
The Istanbul Protocol was submitted to the UN High Commissioner for Human Rights on 9 August 1999. Both the UN General Assembly and the then UN Commission on Human Rights (since 2006, the UN Human Rights Council) have strongly encouraged states to reflect upon the Principles in the Protocol as a useful tool to combat torture.

The UN Special Rapporteur on Torture stressed in his General Recommendations of 2003 the importance of the Istanbul Principles in the context of establishing independent national authorities for investigation; promptness and independence of investigations; independence of forensic medical services by governmental investigatory bodies and obtaining forensic evidence.

On 23 April 2003, the UN Commission on Human Rights, in its resolution on human rights and forensic science, drew the attention of governments to these principles as a useful tool in combating torture. Likewise, reference was made to the Istanbul Protocol in the resolution on the competence of national investigative authorities in preventing torture.

In addition to recognition by the UN system, the Istanbul Protocol has also been adopted by several regional bodies.

The African Commission on Human and Peoples' Rights deliberated on the importance of the Istanbul Protocol during its 32nd ordinary session in October 2002 and concluded that investigations of all allegations of torture or ill-treatment, shall be conducted promptly, impartially and effectively, and be guided by the Istanbul Principles.

The European Union has referred to the Istanbul Protocol in its Guidelines to EU Policy towards Third Countries on Torture and Other Cruel, Inhuman or Degrading Treatment or Punishment adopted by the General Affairs Council in 2001. The EU guidelines mention that states should “conduct prompt, impartial and effective investigations of all allegations of torture in accordance with the Istanbul Rules annexed to CHR resolution 2000/43” and should “establish and operate effective domestic procedures for responding to and investigating complaints and reports of torture and ill-treatment in accordance with the Istanbul Rules.”

Other institutions and organisations have reiterated the UN and other bodies’ recommendations in their reports, statements, and comments (including the Advisory Council of Jurists and the Asia Pacific Forum of National Human Rights Institutions). These references can roughly be summarised into three categories:

- References that cite the Istanbul Protocol as a useful tool in the efforts to combat torture and strongly encourage governments to reflect upon the principles contained in the Protocol;
- References that stress that all investigations and documentation of torture allegations should be conducted promptly, impartially and effectively, and be guided by the Istanbul Principles;
- References that say that states should establish and operate effective domestic procedures for the investigation and documentation of torture allegations in accordance with the Istanbul Protocol.

== See also ==
- Optional Protocol to the Convention against Torture and other Cruel, Inhuman or Degrading Treatment or Punishment (2006)
- Physicians for Human Rights
- International Rehabilitation Council for Torture Victims
- Center for Victims of Torture
- Freedom from Torture
- Minnesota Protocol
