= David Weissbrodt =

American legal scholar (1944–2021)

- Born: October 13, 1944; Washington, D.C., U.S.
- Died: November 11, 2021 (aged 77); Minneapolis, Minnesota, U.S.
- Known for: Drafting the Minnesota Protocol

Academic background
- Education: Columbia University (BA); University of California, Berkeley (JD)

Academic work
- Discipline: Human Rights Law
- Institutions: University of Minnesota Law School

David S. Weissbrodt (October 13, 1944 – November 11, 2021) was an American legal scholar. He was Regents Professor Emeritus and Fredrikson & Byron Professor of Law Emeritus at the University of Minnesota Law School.

== Biography ==
Weissbrodt was born into a family of lawyers and scholars in Washington, D.C., on October 13, 1944. His father was Israel S. "Lefty" Weissbrodt, a Columbia-trained lawyer who specialized in Indian tribal claims against the U.S. government. His mother was Selma J. Mushkin, a Georgetown University economist and authority on health programs and public management. His uncle was Abe William Weissbrodt, a star basketball player at City College of New York who later pursued a legal career and prosecuted German companies for their ties to Nazi war crimes during World War II. His cousin, Arthur Weissbrodt, was a judge on the United States bankruptcy court for the Northern District of California.

He earned his A.B. from Columbia University and attended the London School of Economics. He received his J.D. from the University of California, Berkeley, where was Notes & Comments Editor of the California Law Review. He then interned at the International Commission of Jurists in Geneva, Switzerland, clerked for judge Mathew O. Tobriner of the Supreme Court of California and practiced law at Covington & Burling. He joined the law faculty of the University of Minnesota in 1975.

Weissbrodt launched the Human Rights Center at the University of Minnesota and built the largest human rights library in the world in 1988. He was named Regents Professor in 2005, the highest honor awarded to a faculty member.

From 1996 to 2003, Weissbrodt was a member of the United Nations Sub-Commission on the Promotion and Protection of Human Rights and chaired it from 2001 to 2002, becoming the first U.S. citizen to head a U.N. human rights body since Eleanor Roosevelt. He served as the U.N. Special Rapporteur on the rights of non-citizens from 2000 to 2003. He was a director of the United Nations Voluntary Trust Fund on Contemporary Forms of Slavery and was elected its chairman in 2008.

Wessbrodt was also a founder of the Center for Victims of Torture. During the 1980s, he also helped establish guidelines for effectively investigating extrajudicial killings, known today as the Minnesota Protocol on the Investigation of Potentially Unlawful Death.

Weissbrodt died at the age of 77 on November 11, 2021.
