= Pro-choice and pro-life =

Terms used in the abortion debate

Pro-choice and pro-life are terms of self-identification used within the abortion debate, describing positions which support and restrict access to abortion, respectively. They are generally considered loaded language, since each side frames their position in terms of inherently positive qualities (and thus positions their opponents as "anti-choice" or "anti-life"). For this reason, more neutral or descriptive alternatives are sometimes preferred, for example by describing groups or individuals as supporters or opponents of abortion or abortion rights.

The term pro-life began to be used by opponents of legal abortion around the early 1970s, born from the related term "right to life". The term pro-choice (or "right to choose") was coined in response by abortion rights advocates shortly after.

== Origins ==
=== Pro-life ===
The earliest use of the term pro-life cited by the Oxford English Dictionary is in the 1960 book Summerhill: A Radical Approach to Child Rearing by educator A. S. Neill, though Neill uses it in a more general sense not specific to abortion:

"No pro-life parent or teacher would ever strike a child. No pro-life citizen would tolerate our penal code, our hangings, our punishment of homosexuals, our attitude toward bastardy."

The earliest citation for an abortion-specific sense of the term is a 1971 reference in the Los Angeles Times to "pro-life, anti-abortion educational programs".

The adjective pro-life seems to derive from earlier constructions involving the word life used by opponents of legal abortion, particularly the phrase "right to life". For example, anti-abortion organizations founded in the late 1960s included the Right to Life League and Minnesota Citizens Concerned for Life. However, in early usage, prior to the 1973 Supreme Court case Roe v. Wade, the "pro-life" or "right to life" position more commonly encompassed progressive views such as opposition to war and the death penalty in addition to opposition to abortion. New York Times language columnist William Safire credits Nellie Gray with popularizing pro-life as a shortened form of the "right to life" slogan. Gray founded the annual March for Life in Washington in 1974.

=== Pro-choice ===
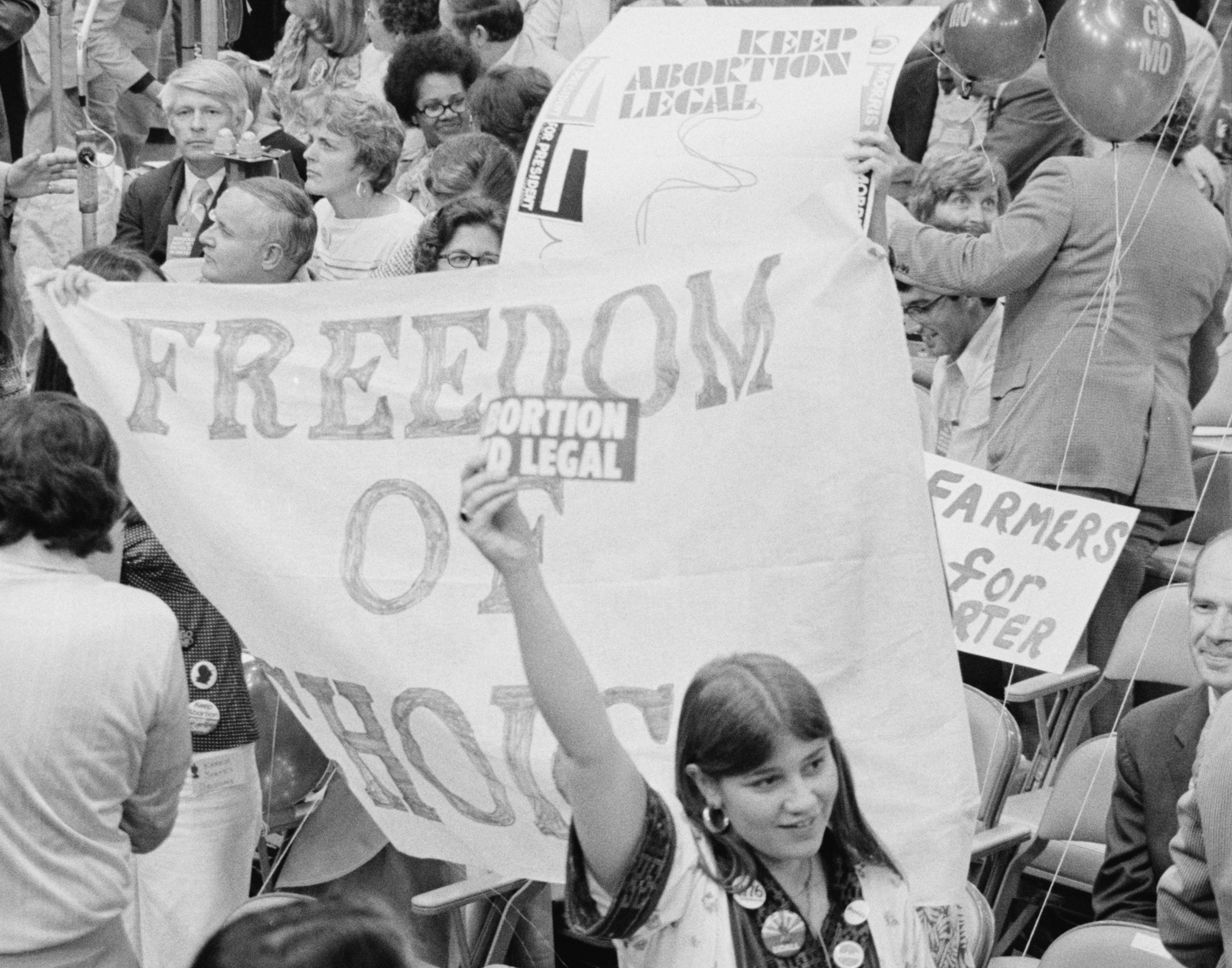
A sign at the 1976 Democratic National Convention reading "Freedom of Choice". This and the slogan "right to choose" prefigured the popularity of the term pro-choice.

The term pro-choice entered currency after pro-life and was coined by those who supported legal abortion as a response to the success of the pro-life branding. The first use of the term cited by the Oxford English Dictionary is in a 1969 issue of the California daily newspaper the Oxnard Press-Courier, which referred to "Pro-choice and anti-abortion activists... headed to the Women's Clinic." Authors Linda Greenhouse and Reva B. Siegel identify a 1972 memo by Jimmye Kimmey, executive director of the Association for the Study of Abortion, as the genesis of the subsequent widespread adoption of the pro-choice label. In the memo, Kimmey identifies "the need to find a phrase to counter the Right to Life slogan", and suggests "Freedom of Conscience" and "Right to Choose" as possibilities, with a preference for the latter because of its brevity and focus on action rather than the "internal matter" of conscience. William Safire suggests the slogan may have drawn influence from the use of "Freedom of Choice" as an anti-integration slogan in the previous decade.

In the years before pro-choice became widely adopted, the qualifier pro-abortion was commonly used by those advocating for legal abortion. For example, a representative of Planned Parenthood referred to "pro-abortion" legislation in a 1975 statement to The Wall Street Journal. When abortion was legalized in the United States, the term fell out of fashion, seen as distracting or inaccurate because many people support legal access to abortion without arguing that it is the right choice.

== Criticism and analysis ==
Those who identify as pro-choice generally reject the framing of the term pro-life and vice-versa. The terms are commonly interpreted as derogating the other side of the debate by implying that they are either "anti-choice" or "anti-life" (or "pro-death"). The decision to brand the movements in positive rather than negative terms has been compared to the earlier use of the phrase "right-to-work" instead of "anti-union".

Planned Parenthood announced in 2013 that it would no longer use the label pro-choice. The organization suggested that the word choice might have an undesirably "frivolous" connotation, and that polling suggested that the binary labels pro-choice and pro-life failed to capture the nuanced views of Americans toward abortion. For example, one poll sponsored by the organization showed that 35% of voters who identified as pro-life did not believe Roe v. Wade should be overturned. Another survey found that 12% of respondents identified with both the labels pro-choice and pro-life simultaneously. Planned Parenthood deliberately declined to propose a replacement term.

=== Expanded definitions ===
On one Mothers' Day, US pastor-turned-senator Raphael Gamaliel Warnock argued that being 'anti-abortion' and being 'pro-life' are not synonymous.

An article in the National Catholic Reporter has asserted that climate change is the "No. 1 pro-life issue" facing the Catholic Church today.

== Media usage ==
Many press style guides, including those used by NPR and the Associated Press, advise against using the terms pro-choice and pro-life, except in cases where those terms occur in the name of an organization or in a quote. NPR's policy recommends alternative constructions such as "abortion rights supporters" and "abortion rights opponents". It permits the qualifier "anti-abortion", but not "pro-abortion rights". The style guide of The Guardian recommends the terms "anti-abortion" (rather than "pro-life") and "pro-choice" (rather than "pro-abortion").

== See also ==
- Affirmation of life – Concept in Friedrich Nietzsche's philosophy
- Consistent life ethic – Ethic opposing loss of life
- Culture of life and culture of death (Pope John Paul II) – Way of life highlighting life's sanctity
- Reverence for Life – Concept in Albert Schweitzer's ethical philosophy (Albert Schweitzer)
