= Jonathan Fine =

American physician and activist (1931–2018)

- Born: 1931
- Died: 2018 (aged 86–87)
- Education: Harvard Law School; Roxbury Latin School; Yale School of Medicine; Swarthmore College
- Occupation: Primary case physician

Jonathan E. Fine (1931–2018) was an American primary care physician based in Massachusetts and the founder and first executive director of Physicians for Human Rights (PHR), which shared a Nobel Peace Prize in 1997. As part of PHR, he helped pioneer the study of abuses that affected large groups or populations, such as war. He advocated for the use of epidemiology and population-based science to recount events and horrors people suffered.

== Early studies, career, and advocacy ==
Fine was the son of Jacob and Anne Fine and was born in Boston, where his father was the Chief of Surgery at Beth Israel Hospital. He attended Roxbury Latin School and when he was around six or seven, his father gave him a few dollars to send to an organization that helped blind children in China. Fine cites this as the first time he was aware of poor conditions that others experienced.

He obtained a bachelor's degree from Swarthmore College, where he was a prolific activist. He requested to be placed with a black roommate and organized a boycott of the town's barbers who would not accept black customers. Then, during the McCarthy era, he served as a private in the US Army.

After a brief stint at Harvard Law School, Fine switched to the Yale School of Medicine. While finishing his studies, he was awarded a Fulbright grant to study health needs in India. This led him to become interested in poverty overseas and in injustice.

Fine completed his medical internship in Puerto Rico and his residency at Brigham and Women's Hospital in Boston. He also had a master's in public health from the Johns Hopkins School of Public Health and subsequently served as an advisor for the US Agency for International Development in Washington, D.C. and Peru. In Boston, he was appointed the city's deputy health commissioner and director of public health and community services. In these roles, he established health centers throughout the city.

In 1981, John Womack Jr, a professor of Latin American history at Harvard University, asked Fine if he knew any physicians who could speak Spanish and would be willing to travel to Chile immediately to help release three doctors who had been detained by the Pinochet regime. Fine volunteered himself and recruited another American physician, James S. Koopman, to join the mission. They traveled to Chile on behalf of five groups, including the American Public Health Association and the American Association for the Advancement of Science. Once in Chile, Fine discovered where the doctors, who were supporters of Allende, had been imprisoned. He publicized their detainment and helped secure their release five weeks later. The delegation published a report in The New York Times, describing the doctors' detention as "a serious act of state repression."

== Physicians for Human Rights ==
In 1986, Fine worked with a group of other doctors to found Physicians for Human Rights (PHR). He became its first director, forming the organization's mission along the belief that health professionals could use their skills to help investigate and document atrocities. Fine, then 55, resigned from his job to pursue PHR full time. He financed the organization personally, selling his house in order to fund staff salaries, office space, and the international investigations themselves in the early years.

Since its inception, PHR has worked in 60 different countries and undertook more than 70 missions in its first decade. Fine led many of the early investigations himself, including those of the use of teargas in South Korea, the deployment of chemical weapons against Kurds in Iraq, and injuries to protestors in the Palestinian territories occupied by Israel. In 1997, PHR was part of a coalition campaigning for a ban on landmines that was awarded a Nobel Peace Prize.

== Later life ==
Fine retired from PHR in 1993, at the age of 62. He then directed a center for Brazilian immigrants in Boston and supported local doctors in Chhattisgarh, India. In 2007, at age 75, he founded Bedside Advocates to help elderly and frail patients navigate the complex medical system. He died in Cambridge, Massachusetts on January 17, 2018, aged 86 years.
