= Alejandro Rodriguez (psychiatrist) =

Child psychiatrist (1918–2012)

Alejandro Rodriguez (February 1918 – January 20, 2012) was a Venezuelan-American pediatrician and psychiatrist, known for his pioneering work in child psychiatry. He was the director of the division of child psychiatry at the Johns Hopkins University School of Medicine, and conducted pivotal studies on autism and other developmental disorders in children.

== Early life ==
Alejandro Rodriguez was born in Caracas, Venezuela, in 1918, to a businessman and a homemaker. He spent his entire youth in Caracas, Venezuela. After his graduation from Colegio San Ignacio de Loyola in Caracas, he entered Universidad Central de Venezuela, where he earned his medical degree in 1939.

In 1942, he received a private scholarship for pediatrics training at Johns Hopkins. Upon completion of his pediatrics residency, Rodriguez returned to Venezuela, where he practiced for 13 years.

== Years at Johns Hopkins ==
Rodriguez then returned to the United States in 1956, to study psychiatry at Stanford University, where he stayed for one year. He returned to Johns Hopkins to complete his child psychiatry training, and was later employed under Leo Kanner. Kanner was the division chief in the 1950s, during the early days of child psychiatry. Kanner mentored both Rodriguez and Dr. Leon Eisenberg, who became Johns Hopkins Division Chief after the retirement of Kanner. Leo Kanner is credited with discovering the syndrome of autism in 1935 and by many is considered to be "the founding parent of child psychiatry", since he coined the term autism in 1935 and authored the first child psychiatry textbook. In 1959, while Eisenberg was Division Chief of Psychiatry at Johns Hopkins, and Rodriguez reported to him, they co-authored – with Maria Rodriguez, Alejandro's wife – a famous paper describing school phobia syndrome as a variant of separation anxiety.

When Eisenberg resigned in 1968 to leave for Boston to become Chief of Psychiatry at the Massachusetts General Hospital, Rodriguez became the director of the Division of Child Psychiatry at Johns Hopkins. He held this position until his retirement in 1978. Rodriguez authored Handbook of Child Abuse and Neglect in 1977. Rodriguez continued seeing patients until age 85.

== Death ==
Dr. Alejandro Rodriguez died of heart failure complications at his home in Palm City, Florida, on January 20, 2012. Rodriguez is survived by his second wife, Maria Consuelo Rodriguez; his son, two grandchildren, and 4 step-children.

== Bibliography ==
Rodriguez A, Rodriguez M and Eisenberg L. (1959). The outcome of school phobia: a follow up study. Am J Psychiat. (December); 116:540-544. Rodriguez, A. (1977). Handbook of Child Abuse and Neglect. Medical Examination Publishing Company. ISBN 0874886481.
