= Reproductive Freedom for All =

American reproductive rights advocacy group

- Abbreviation: NARAL
- Formation: 1969
- Founder: Lawrence Lader; Ernesta Drinker Ballard; Bernard Nathanson; Betty Friedan
- Type: 501(c)(4) with associated 501(c)(3) and PAC
- Headquarters: Washington, D. C.
- Members: 4 million (2022)
- President: Mini Timmaraju
- Website: reproductivefreedomforall.org

Reproductive Freedom for All, formerly National Association for the Repeal of Abortion Laws (NARAL) and NARAL Pro-Choice America, and commonly known as NARAL (/ˈnɛərəl/ NAIR-əl), is a non-profit 501(c)(4) organization in the United States. It lobbies, takes political action, and opposes restrictions on abortion, promotes access to legal abortion and birth control, and supports paid parental leave and protection against pregnancy discrimination. NARAL links to the NARAL Pro-Choice America Foundation, a 501(c)(3) group, and the NARAL Pro-Choice America PAC, a political action committee. Founded in 1969, NARAL is the oldest extant abortion rights advocacy group in the United States, though predated by defunct groups like the Association for the Study of Abortion.

== History ==
NARAL's precursor was the Association to Repeal Abortion Laws (ARAL), an expansion of the "Army of Three" (abortion rights activists Pat Maginnis, Rowena Gurner, and Lana Phelan) who organized referral lists for illegal abortions and held do-it-yourself abortion classes in California.

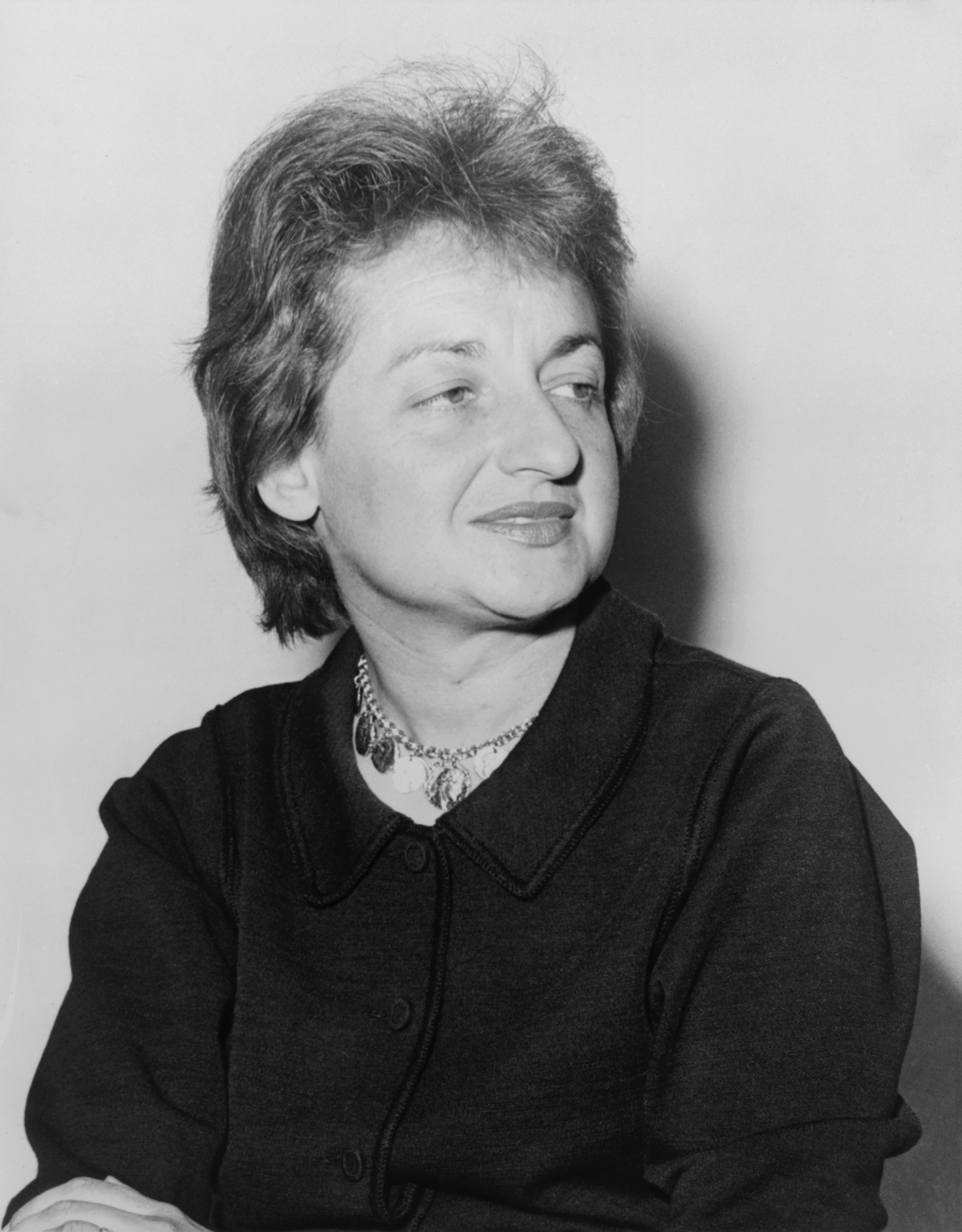
Betty Friedan

Originally named the National Association for the Repeal of Abortion Laws, NARAL formed at the "First National Conference on Abortion Laws: Modification or Repeal?" in Chicago from February 14–16, 1969, sponsored by 21 organizations and attended by 350 people. Its formation appeared on The New York Times' front page. The conference featured a planning session for NARAL and a report from its pre-formation committee: Lawrence Lader of New York City, Garrett Hardin of California, and Dr. Lonny Myers of Chicago. Speakers included obstetrician/gynecologist Bernard Nathanson (later an anti-abortion activist), journalist Lawrence Lader, and women's rights advocate Betty Friedan. Attendees split between favoring abortion law "reform" (like American Law Institute guidelines allowing abortion for mother's health, rape, or incest) and "repeal" (abortion at mother's discretion, led by Friedan and Conni Bille). The conference voted for repeal. Several founders, including Lader, were active in the pro-reform Association for the Study of Abortion from 1965 and population groups like the Association for Voluntary Sterilization and Zero Population Growth. The planning committee hired Lee Gidding as first Executive Director; she opened NARAL's New York office on March 3, 1969. NARAL's purpose was to recognize a woman's right to limit reproduction and eliminate laws compelling unwanted births, coordinating actions for safe abortions by qualified physicians regardless of economic status. Its program included forming state groups, serving as a clearinghouse, creating materials, training workers, suggesting projects, and raising funds. The board, elected September 27, 1969, adopted a program focused on repeal in New York and key states. In 1970, New York legalized abortion; NARAL held a medical conference for non-hospital techniques. From 1969 to 1973, NARAL worked to repeal laws and implement policies in liberal states. On January 22, 1973, Roe v. Wade allowed first-trimester abortions as private decisions and second-trimester regulation for woman's health. NARAL became the National Abortion Rights Action League in late 1973. In 2003, it became "NARAL Pro-Choice America" and launched a campaign for 2004 elections. From 1987 to 2006, Ann McGuiness was development director. In September 2023, NARAL became Reproductive Freedom for All to reflect post-Roe v. Wade views after Dobbs v. Jackson Women's Health Organization.

=== National executive directors ===
Karen Mulhauser was national executive director from 1974 to 1982. Nanette Falkenburg served from 1982 to 1985. Kate Michelman led until retiring in 2004. Nancy Keenan, former Montana Superintendent of Schools, was president until February 2013. Ilyse Hogue served from 2013 to 2021. In November 2021, NARAL hired Mini Timmaraju, the first woman of color to lead it.

== Activities ==
Reproductive Freedom for All lobbies for abortion and birth control access, paid parental leave, and anti-pregnancy discrimination measures. It tracks legislation, endorses candidates, and runs ads and education campaigns. It sponsors lawsuits against governments and hospitals, donates via its PAC to supportive politicians, and mobilizes members to contact Congress. It sponsored the 2004 March for Women's Lives. It promotes public sex education and tracks abortion-related laws. It recruits members through state chapters.

== Criticism ==
In 2005, NARAL withdrew an ad campaign targeting Supreme Court nominee John Roberts after criticism. The ad featured anti-abortion violence survivor Emily Lyons and claimed Roberts supported violent groups and a clinic bomber. Roberts argued a 19th-century anti-Ku Klux Klan law did not apply to clinic protesters, but the case predated the 1998 bombing shown. Other pro-abortion rights groups pressured withdrawal, citing harm to credibility. In 2006, some pro-abortion rights activists criticized NARAL for supporting Republican Lincoln Chafee and moderate or conservative Democrats.

== See also ==
- Abortion Law Reform Association (ALRA) – British contemporary organisation
