= Sharon Camp =

Reproductive health activist (1943–2025)

- Born: November 7, 1943; Easton, Pennsylvania, U.S.
- Died: October 25, 2025 (aged 81); La Plata, Maryland, U.S.
- Education: Pomona College; Johns Hopkins University
- Title: CEO and president of Guttmacher Institute

Sharon Lee Camp (November 7, 1943 – October 25, 2025) was an American policy expert and women's reproductive health activist. She served as the CEO and president of the Guttmacher Institute for ten years until her retirement in 2013. A women's reproductive health campaigner, she was the force behind making the Plan B Contraceptive Pill available in the United States.

== Early life and education ==
Sharon Camp was born in Easton, Pennsylvania, on November 7, 1943 to June (née Stout) and Albert Camp, which was the nearest hospital to her parents’ house across the Delaware river in New Jersey. She was the eldest of three sisters. Her father worked for the US Navy as a scientist specialising in rocket fuels. She lived on a base in China Lake, California for part of her childhood as the family moved with her father's job.

Camp was an honors graduate of Pomona College (class of 1965) where she had studied international relations. She was on the yearbook staff, was a tour guide and played badminton as well as taking part in Model United Nations. She also held a master's degree, rooted on African Studies with focus on development economics and political development. She spent a semester studying at the University of Geneva in Switzerland. Following hitchhiking through Africa with female friend with a backpack and a sleeping bag she undertook a Ph.D. in comparative and international politics, doing her doctoral dissertation on Charles County, Maryland, researching political development in southern Maryland, a rapidly modernizing area of the country. The later two degrees were from Johns Hopkins University. Whilst undertaking her Ph.D, Camp was elected to serve on the Democratic State Central Committee for Charles County, which included sitting on the Drug Abuse Committee and the local Mental Health Advisory Committee. She later credited this experience as getting her interested in state health activities. Aged 23, she narrowly survived an illegal abortion in Mexico.

== Career ==
Immediately after graduation, Camp worked as a lobbyist for children's food programs for children and on behalf of Native Americans. Following this she spent 18 years (1975 to 1993) at the Population Crisis Committee non profit organisation (now called Population Action International), working internationally and seeing first hand the terrrible social problems caused by lack of access to birth control. Camp ultimately became Senior Vice President.

Camp was a key but anonymous author of the Programme of Action adopted by the world’s governments at the 1994 International Conference on Population.

In 1997 Camp was the founder, CEO and President of Women’s Capital Corporation, "the company responsible for the development and commercialization of the Plan B emergency contraceptive". The small pharmaceutical company was founded in January 1997 and is considered to be the "mother of Plan B". Half of the proceeds from the emergency contraceptive was reinvested in the nonprofits which had financed the development, with the other fifty percent directed into a charitable trust. Camp succedded in getting regulatory approval for the contraceptive, which had a transformative impact in both the United States and Canada. She was responsible for building the groundwork to enable the move from prescription to over-the-counter contraceptive provision in the two countries.

Camp was a key player in the International Consortium for Emergency Contraception, which led to emergency contraception being considered a standard part of women’s health care across the globe.

In 2003, Camp moved to the Guttmacher Institute as president and CEO. She led the global reproductive health research and policy organization for a decade.

Camp chaired the boards of Family Health International, the National Council for International Health (now the Global Health Council), and the International Center for Research on Women, and was founding Chair of the Reproductive Health Technologies Project. She announced her retirement from the Guttmacher Institute, effective July 15, 2013.

Sharon Camp died on October 25, 2025, at a rehabilitation facility in La Plata, Maryland, aged 81. In March 2026, she was inducted into the Maryland Women's Hall of Fame.

== Legacy ==
Camp gave Pomona college an unrestricted bequest sixty years after she graduated.
