= Association of Reproductive Health Professionals =

US professional organization

- Operates in the USA
- Abbreviation: ARHP
- Formation: 1963; 63 years ago
- Founder: Alan Frank Guttmacher
- Dissolved: 2019; 7 years ago
- Purpose: Reproductive health
- Headquarters: Washington, DC
- Members: nurse practitioners nurse midwives pharmacists physician assistants physicians researchers educators other professionals

The Association of Reproductive Health Professionals (ARHP) was a non-profit organization founded in 1963 by Alan Frank Guttmacher. It was a membership association of nurse practitioners, nurse midwives, pharmacists, physician assistants, physicians, researchers, educators, and other professionals. The organization closed in 2019.

According to their mission statement, the organization aimed to "...provide reproductive health services or education, conduct reproductive health research, or influence reproductive health policy. ARHP educated healthcare professionals, policy makers and the public. The organization fostered research and advocacy to improve reproductive health."

The organization was accredited by the Accreditation Council for Continuing Medical Education and the Accreditation Council for Pharmacy Education.

Contraception was the group's official journal.
