= Guttmacher Institute =

American abortion research organization

- Formation: 1968; 58 years ago (as Center for Family Planning Program Development)
- Type: NGO
- Purpose: Reproductive health, birth control
- Region served: United States and globally
- CEO: Jonathan Wittenberg
- Budget: $19 million
- Website: guttmacher.org

The Guttmacher Institute is an American research and policy NGO that aims to improve sexual health and expand reproductive rights worldwide. The organization was started in 1968 as part of Planned Parenthood; it became independent from Planned Parenthood in 2007. It functions as both a research and educational organization. It operates mainly in the United States, and also in developing countries.

The institute is named after obstetrician-gynecologist and former president of Planned Parenthood Alan F. Guttmacher. The Guttmacher Institute has many sources of funding nationally and internationally. One of its projects is keeping a running list of the reproductive health laws and policies throughout the United States. As of April 2025 Jonathan Wittenberg and Destiny Lopez are co-presidents and co-CEOs.

== History ==
Founded in 1968, the Guttmacher Institute was originally called the Center for Family Planning Program Development and was a branch of Planned Parenthood. After Alan Guttmacher's death, the Center for Family Planning Program Development was renamed and became an independent non-profit organization. In 2007, the organization officially split from Planned Parenthood.

== Activities ==
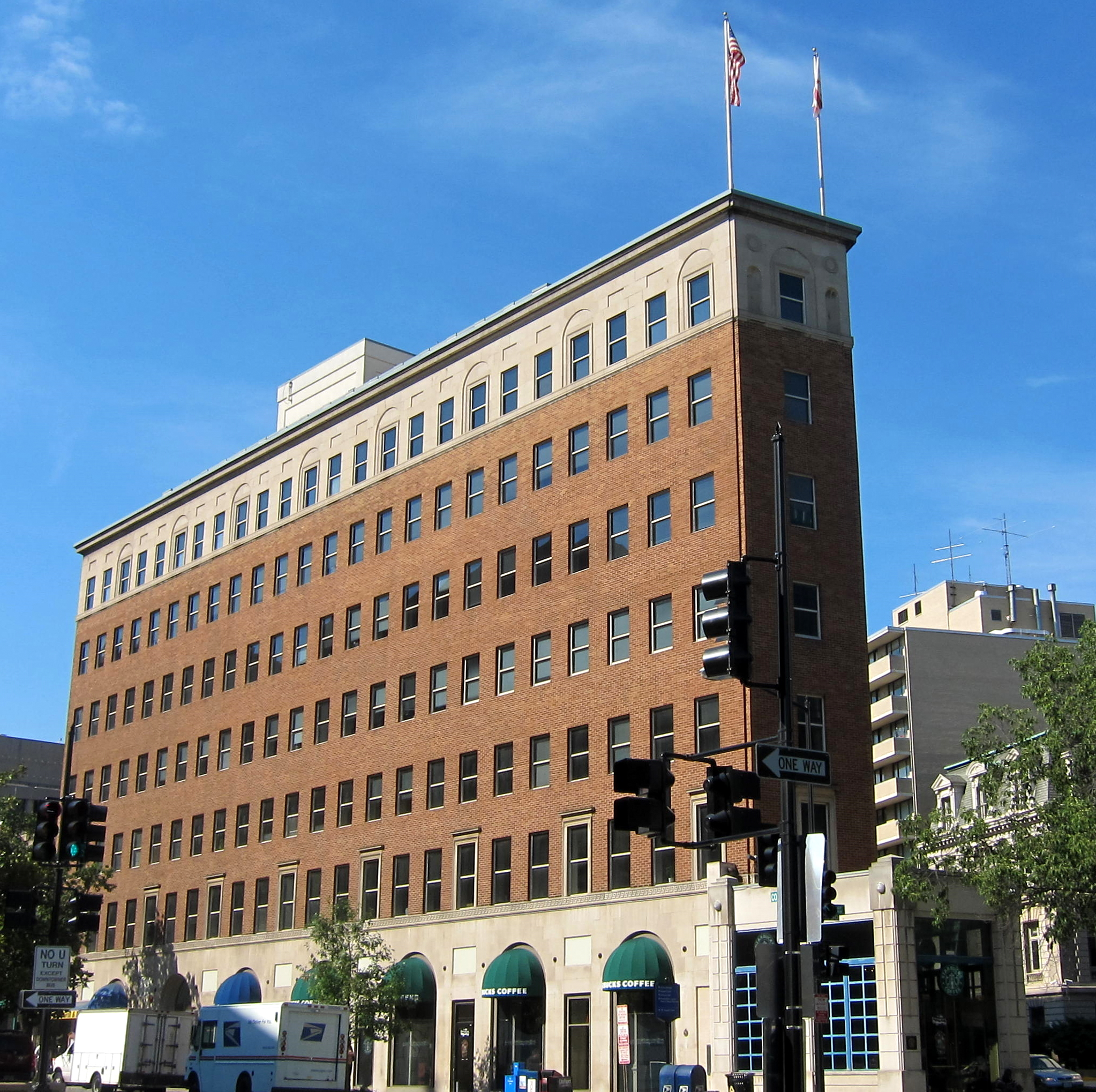
The Guttmacher Institute's Washington, D.C., location.

The Guttmacher Institute continually monitors state and national laws and policies about contraception and abortion. The institute records the restrictions on reproductive health that different states have put in place. The organization also keeps data about how teens are affected by pregnancy and the number of teens who use contraception. Internationally, the Guttmacher Institute uses statistical models to give an approximation of the number of abortions in places where they are illegal and/or the abortions happen outside of formal health care settings.

In 2013, the Guttmacher Institute was awarded a Population Center grant by the US National Institutes of Health in support of its Center for Population Research Innovation and Dissemination. The Guttmacher Institute has received Charity Navigator's highest (4-Star) rating annually since 2010.

== Funding ==
When the institute was founded in 1968, its parent organization, Planned Parenthood, was its sole source of its funding. Three years after becoming independent in 2007, the organization received less than 1% of its funding from Planned Parenthood in 2010. Now, most of the funding is gained through private foundations based in the United States. Other funding comes from international organizations such as the World Health Organization and the World Bank. The Guttmacher Institute was awarded $3.9 million between 1986 and 2015 by the MacArthur Foundation, including 13 grants in population and reproductive health.

== Nonpartisanship ==
The Guttmacher Institute is not affiliated with a political party, and so it is nonpartisan in the strict sense of the word. The group works to "ensure that all women are able to exercise their reproductive rights and responsibilities", which puts them among advocates of abortion rights. According to FactCheck, Guttmacher "provides the most highly respected statistics on the sexual health of women and men. Its figures on abortion are widely cited by the media as well as by groups on both sides of the political aisle."

== See also ==
- Sharon Camp, former CEO
