= Political killing =

Political killing may refer to:

- Extrajudicial killing, a death carried out without lawful authority granted by judicial proceedings-- often political in nature whether government is involved at all (i.e. authoritarian regimes) or not (i.e. lynchings)
- Politicide, killing of a group based on their political ideology or affiliation
- Assassination, killing of an often high-profile individual for often-political purposes
