= Alan Edward Guttmacher =

Director of the National Institute of Child Health (NICHD)

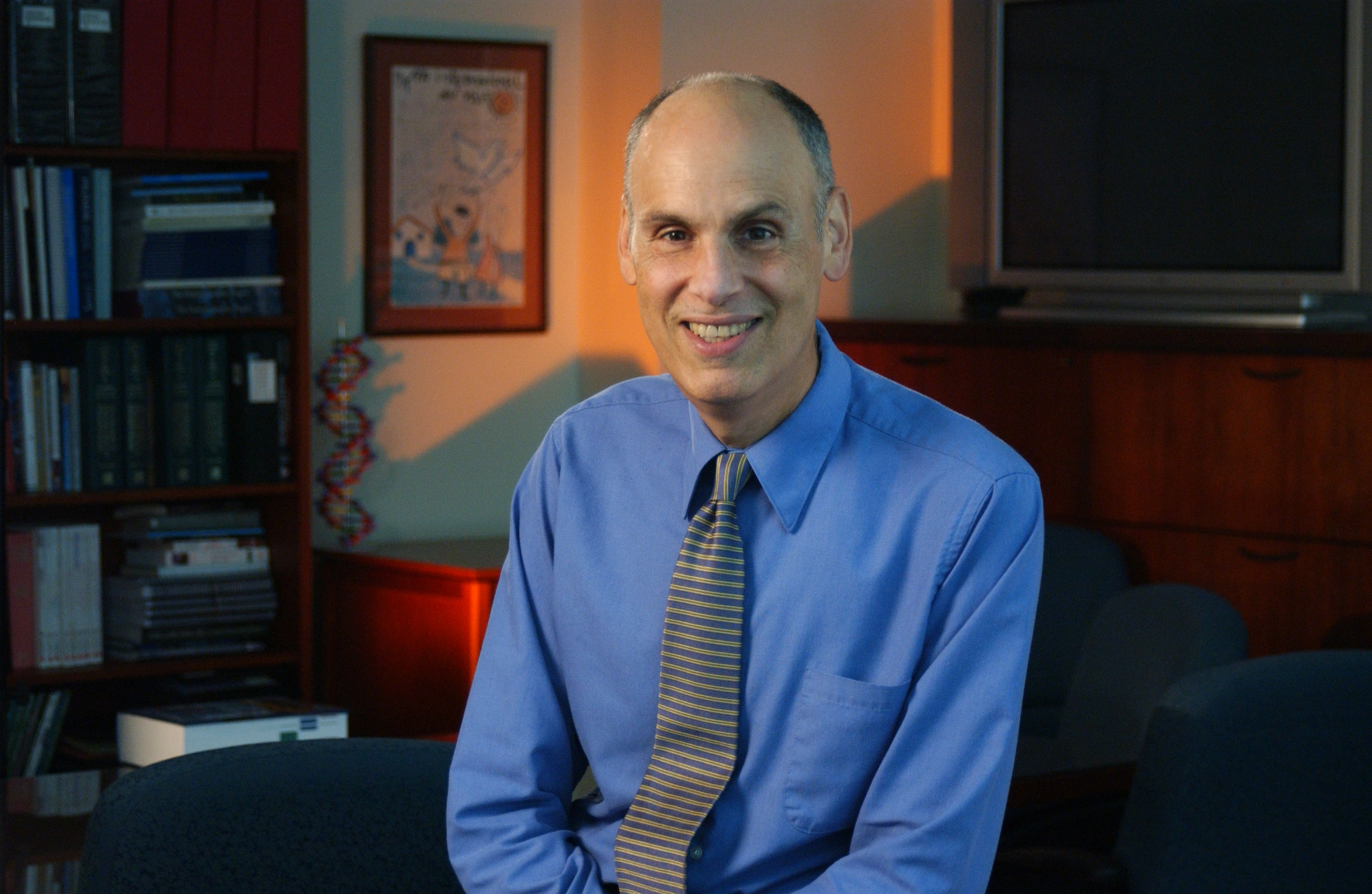
- Born: 1949 (age 75–76)
- Education: Harvard Medical School (1981)
- Known for: Director of the NICHD
- Medical career
- Profession: Physician
- Field: Pediatrics, medical genetics
- Institutions: Children's Hospital Boston; Vermont Regional Genetics Center; University of Vermont; National Human Genome Research Institute
- Research: Genetic disorders

Alan Edward Guttmacher (born 1949) is an American physician who was the director of the National Institute of Child Health (NICHD), one of the 27 institutes and centers that comprise the National Institutes of Health (NIH). In that capacity, he oversaw the institute’s activities as the focal point at the NIH for research in pediatric health and development, maternal health, reproductive health, intellectual and developmental disabilities, and rehabilitation medicine, among other areas.

A pediatrician and medical geneticist, Guttmacher came to NIH in 1999 to work at the National Human Genome Research Institute, where he served in a number of roles, including deputy director and acting director, thus overseeing that institute’s efforts to advance genome research, integrate that research into health care, and explore the ethical, legal, and social implications of human genomics. Among Guttmacher’s areas of expertise is the development of new approaches for translating genomics into better ways of diagnosing, treating, and preventing disease. A major research interest has been the disease, hereditary hemorrhagic telangiectasia.

== Education ==
Guttmacher received his A.B. degree in 1972 from Harvard College and his M.D. from Harvard Medical School in 1981. From 1982 to 1985, he interned and was a medical resident in pediatrics at Children's Hospital in Boston, Massachusetts. In 1985, he earned a two-year National Research Service Award from the U.S. Public Health Service as a fellow in medical genetics at Children's Hospital Boston and Harvard Medical School.

== Vermont ==
In 1987, Guttmacher became director of the Vermont Regional Genetics Center at the University of Vermont College of Medicine where he launched a series of programs in public health genetics, as well as directing the Vermont Cancer Center's Familial Cancer Program, the Vermont Newborn Screening Program, Vermont's only pediatric intensive care unit and the United States' first statewide effort to involve the general public in discussion of the Human Genome Project's ethical, legal, and social implications, supported by the NIH. He also maintained a busy practice in clinical genetics, conducted research, and was a tenured associate professor of pediatrics and medicine at the University of Vermont.

== National Human Genome Research Institute ==
In 1999, Guttmacher joined the NHGRI as senior clinical advisor to the director, where he involved health professionals and the public in a discussion about the health and societal implications of the Human Genome Project and gave hundreds of talks to physicians, consumer groups, students, and the public about genetics and its impact on health, health care and society. He also served as acting director of the NHGRI Office of Policy, Planning and Communications.

In 1996 the NHGRI had partnered with the American Medical Association and the American Nurses Association to establish the National Coalition for Health Professional Education in Genetics (NCHPEG), a non-profit coalition that promotes professional education and access to information about advances in human genetics, operating from within the genome institute. Guttmacher directed the development of NCHPEG into a freestanding entity with 120 member organizations and its own executive director.

In 1999 Guttmacher co-founded a group called "Genetic Resources On the Web (GROW)" which worked with organizations sponsoring genetics-related web sites to ensure they contain high-quality information. GROW's membership included more than 30 organizations, including health professional groups, patient-support groups, federal agencies, foundations, non-profit agencies, and for-profit companies.

In 2003, Guttmacher and the NHGRI's then director, Dr. Francis S. Collins, co-edited a series about the application of advances in genomics to medical care for The New England Journal of Medicine, entitled Genomic Medicine.

On August 2, 2008, Guttmacher assumed the role of Acting Director of NHGRI, while continuing to serve as NHGRI's Deputy Director, a position he had held since 2002]

== Other activities ==
Guttmacher also oversees the NIH's involvement in the U.S. Surgeon General's Family History Initiative, an effort to encourage all Americans to learn about and use their families' health histories to promote personal health and prevent disease.

He is a Fellow of the American Academy of Pediatrics, a Fellow of the American College of Medical Genetics and a member of the Institute of Medicine.

== Family ==
Guttmacher is married to Brigid Coles Guttmacher, community outreach and palliative care counselor of Capital Hospice and founder of the DC Grief and Loss Network, and lives in Washington, D.C.

He is the son of Dr. Manfred Guttmacher, forensic psychiatrist, medical historian, and author; and of Dr. Carola Blitzman Eisenberg, past dean of Student Affairs of Harvard Medical School and dean of students of Massachusetts Institute of Technology, as well as cofounder of Physicians for Human Rights, which in 1997 shared the Nobel Peace Prize with Jody Williams for their International Campaign to Ban Landmines.

== Publications ==
- Shovlin CL, Guttmacher AE, Buscarini E, Faughan ME, Hyland RH, Westermann CJJ, Kjeldsen AD, Plauchu H. Diagnostic Criteria for hereditary hemorrhagic telangiectasia (Rendu–Osler–Weber syndrome). Amer J Med Genetics, 91:66-67. 2000.
- Guttmacher AE. A piece of my mind: twenty lessons from the heart of medicine. JAMA, 284:1486-1487. 2000.
- Guttmacher AE, Collins FS. Genetics resources on the web (GROW). Genetics in Medicine, 2:296-299. 2000.
- Guttmacher AE. Human genetics on the web. Annu Rev Genom Hum Genet, 2:213-233. 2001.
- Collins FS, Guttmacher AE. Genetics moves into the medical mainstream. JAMA, 286: 2322-2324. 2001.
- Guttmacher AE, Jenkins J, Uhlmann W R. Genomic medicine: who will practice it? A call to open arms. Amer J Med Genetics, 106:216-222. 2001.
- Innis JW, Goodman FR, Bacchelli C, Williams TM, Mortlock DP, Sateesh P, Scambler PJ, McKinnon W, Guttmacher AE. A HOXA13 allele with a missense mutation in the homeobox and a dinucleotide deletion in the promoter underlies Guttmacher syndrome. Hum Mutat, 19:573-574. 2002.
- Guttmacher AE, Collins FS. Genomic Medicine - A Primer. New Eng J Med, 347:1512-1521. 2002.
- Collins FC, Green ED, Guttmacher AE, Guyer MS. A vision for the future of genomics research. Nature, 422:835-847. 2003.
- Berg J, Porteous M, Reinhardt D, Gallione C, Holloway S, Umasunthar T, Lux A, McKinnon C, Marchuk D, Guttmacher A. Hereditary haemorrhagic telangiectasia: a questionnaire based study to delineate the different phenotypes caused by endoglin and Alk 1 mutations. J Med Genet, 40:1-6. 2003.
- Guttmacher A.E., Collins F.S. Welcome to the genomic era. New Eng J Med, 349:996-8. 2003.
- Guttmacher A.E, Collins F.S., Carmona R.H. The Family History: More Important Than Ever. New Eng J Med, 351:2333-2336. 2004.
- Guttmacher A.E, Collins, F.S. Realizing the promise of genomics for biomedical research. JAMA, 294(11):1399-402. 2005.
- Guttmacher, A.E., Porteous, M.E., McInerney, J.D. Educating health care professionals about genetics and genomics. Nat Rev Genet, 2007.
- Guttmacher A.E, Ullman W.R., Key Internet Genetics Resources for the Clinician. JAMA, 299(11):1356-1358. 2008.
- Guttmacher A.E, Collins, F.S., Feero, W. G., The Genome Gets Personal - Almost. JAMA, 299(11):1351-1352. 2008.

=== Books ===
- Guttmacher, A.E., Collins, F.S., Drazen, J.M., eds. Genomic Medicine: Articles from the New England Journal of Medicine. Johns Hopkins University Press, Baltimore, Md. 2004.
- Guttmacher, A.E. "Breaking the news:" Talking with parents about their child's birth defect or genetic condition. Nursing Care in the Genomic Era. Jenkins, J.F., Lea, D.H. Jones and Bartlett Publishers, pp. 167–173. 2005.
- Guttmacher, A.E, Marchuk, D.A., Pyeritz, R.E. Hereditary hemorrhagic telangiectasia (Osler–Weber–Rendu syndrome). Emory and Rimoin's Principles and practice of Medical Genetics. Churchill Livingstone Elsevier, Fifth Edition, pp. 1200–1213. 2007.
