= Manfred Guttmacher =

American forensic psychiatrist

- Born: Manfred Schanfarber Guttmacher; May 19, 1898; Baltimore, Maryland, US
- Died: November 7, 1966 (aged 68); Stevenson, Maryland, US
- Education: Johns Hopkins (AB, MD)
- Occupations: Psychiatrist; Child psychiatrist Forensic psychiatrist Medical educator
- Spouses: Katherine (Unknown), Jacelyn McDunnough, Carola B. Eisenberg (?-1966)
- Children: 4, including Alan Edward Guttmacher

Manfred Schanfarber Guttmacher (May 19, 1898 – November 7, 1966) was an American forensic psychiatrist and chief medical officer who focused on the connections between psychiatry and criminal law. Guttmacher testified in the trial of Jack Ruby and authored The Dog Must Wag The Tail: Psychiatry And The Law, America's Last King: An Interpretation of the Madness of George III and other works.

Guttmacher was born in 1898 in Baltimore to Rabbi Adolf Guttmacher and Laura (Oppenheimer) Guttmacher, German-Jewish emigrants. Like his twin brother, Alan Frank Guttmacher, his A.B. and M.D. degrees were earned from the Johns Hopkins University in Baltimore, Maryland, after which he served as an intern at the Mount Sinai Hospital in New York City, then as a resident house officer in medicine at the Johns Hopkins Hospital. After two years as an Emmanuel Libman fellow studying neurology, psychiatry, and criminology overseas, he relocated to Boston for psychiatric training at the Boston Psychopathic Hospital.

He was appointed chief medical adviser to the Supreme Bench of Baltimore in 1930, where he served until his 1966 death from leukemia. In 1933, he published his first paper, Psychiatry and the Adult Delinquent in the National Probation Association Yearbook of 1933 (on forensic psychiatry).

== Honors ==
- Isaac Ray Award, 1957
- The Salmon Lectures

== Personal life ==
He had four sons: Richard, Jonathan, Laurence, and Alan. Richard and Jonathan were born with his first wife Jacelyn, and Laurence and Alan were born by his second wife, Carola Eisenberg, MD.

== Works ==
=== Books ===
- Sex Offenses. Norton, 1951.
- (with Henry Weihofen) Psychiatry and the Law. Norton, 1952.
- The Mind of the Murderer. Farrar, Straus, and Cudahy, 1960.
- The Role of Psychiatry in Law. Thomas, 1968.

=== Selected articles ===
- "Adult court psychiatric clinics". American Journal of Psychiatry 106:881–8, 1950.
