= Karlheinz Guttmacher =

German politician

Member of the Bundestag
- In office 20 December 1990 – 18 October 2005

Personal details
- Born: 24 August 1942 (age 83) Danzig
- Party: FDP

Karlheinz Guttmacher (born 24 August 1942) was a German politician of the Free Democratic Party (FDP) and former member of the German Bundestag.

== Life ==
Via the Landesliste Thüringen Guttmacher entered the German Bundestag in 1990 and was a member of parliament until 2005. In the 15th legislative period he was chairman of the Petitions Committee from February 2004.

== Literature ==
Herbst, Ludolf; Jahn, Bruno (2002). Vierhaus, Rudolf (ed.). Biographisches Handbuch der Mitglieder des Deutschen Bundestages. 1949–2002 [Biographical Handbook of the Members of the German Bundestag. 1949–2002] (in German). München: De Gruyter - De Gruyter Saur. p. 1715. ISBN 978-3-11-184511-1.
