= The Advocates for Human Rights =

American nonprofit organization

The Advocates for Human Rights is a Minneapolis-based independent non-governmental organization (NGO) that promotes and advances human rights locally and around the world. It is a volunteer-driven organization with its operations focusing on three key areas: research, advocacy, and community engagement. Specific initiatives include free legal services to low-income asylum seekers and victims of human trafficking.

The organization runs the Human Rights Defender Project (HRDP) in collaboration with the James H. Binger Center for New Americans at the University of Minnesota Law School, and Robins Kaplan LLP.

== Background ==
The Advocates for Human Rights was established in 1983 by a group of lawyers seeking to address human rights issues in Minnesota and contribute to the promotion and protection of human rights around the world. It was first known as Minnesota Lawyers International Human Rights Committee, a group initially intended as a platform for educating its members, lawyers, and the public about human rights. In 1992, the organization changed its name to Minnesota Advocates for Human Rights. It adopted its current name in 2008 in a move to better reflect the local, national, and international scope of its work.

The organization combines advocacy and actual initiatives to help achieve systemic change and provide direct services. This dual focus is demonstrated in how recipients of its assistance also become volunteers, participating in addressing injustice. For example, client immigrants become partners in helping to identify and end human rights violations in their countries of origin. For the protection of migrant rights, the Advocates for Human Rights provide legal support to various cases, which include those who are seeking asylum in ICE detention facilities, human trafficking survivors, and unaccompanied children migrants.

The organization collaborates with partners around the world to combat challenges in the areas of security and safety and also contributes to bridging gaps in legal protection. Its work with international partners is focused on the implementation of international human rights standards with the expectation that it will lead to the promotion of civil society and the reinforcement of the rule of law.

== Issues and initiatives ==
One of the most notable international initiatives of the Human Rights Advocates was the development and publication of the "Minnesota Protocol" or the Manual on the Effective Prevention and Investigation of Extra-Legal, Arbitrary, and Summary Executions. This document earned international recognition and was eventually adopted by the United Nations as the proper practice of forensic procedures in the course of investigations and when conducting autopsies in cases of politically motivated killings. The process became the basis of the UN Principles on the Effective Prevention and Investigation of Extra-legal, Arbitrary, and Summary Executions, which was adopted in 1989. This is acknowledged as a significant development since it addresses the need for a shift in the practices of sovereignty, which is a critical inhibitor for the protection of human rights.

In 2008, the Advocates for Human Rights were sued for defamation by George Boley, leader of the former Liberia Peace Council, which was accused of committing crimes against humanity during the civil war in Liberia. The case was dismissed at a hearing in 2010.
