= Physicians for Human Rights =

US nonprofit non-governmental organization

- Founded: 1986; 40 years ago
- Type: Nonprofit
- Purpose: Human rights
- Location: New York, New York
- Key people: Saman Zia-Zarifi (Executive Director)
- Website: phr.org

Physicians for Human Rights (PHR) is a US-based not-for-profit human rights NGO that uses medicine and science to document and advocate against mass atrocities and severe human rights violations around the world. PHR headquarters are in New York City, with offices in Boston, Washington, D.C., as well as Nairobi. It was established in 1986 to use the unique skills and credibility of health professionals to advocate for persecuted health workers, prevent torture, document mass atrocities, and hold those who violate human rights accountable.

== History ==
In 1981, Jonathan Fine, a primary care physician in Boston, was asked to fly to Chile on short notice and lead a delegation seeking the release of three prominent physicians by General Augusto Pinochet's regime. The three Chilean doctors were released five weeks after Fine's visit.

In 1986, recognizing the impact physicians could have in the human rights field, Fine co-founded Physicians for Human Rights with Jane Green Schaller, Robert Lawrence, Jack Geiger, and Carola Eisenberg.

Since the organization's founding, PHR teams have exposed the use of chemical weapons against civilians in Iraq, exhumed mass graves in Bosnia and Rwanda for international tribunals, and provided evidence for criminal investigations into torture and extrajudicial executions in countries such as Colombia, Honduras, Libya, Mexico, Peru, and Sierra Leone. In 1997, the organization shared the Nobel Peace Prize for medically documenting landmine injuries and serving as a leader in the International Campaign to Ban Landmines.

PHR has also been at the forefront in developing standards for human rights abuse documentation: staff member Vincent Iacopino played a lead role in developing the Istanbul Protocol, the recognized international standard for documenting torture and ill treatment. Likewise, the Director of the International Forensics Program was involved in the revision process of the Minnesota Protocol, the international guidance on the investigation of potentially unlawful death. Governments, United Nations agencies, international and national courts, and other human rights organizations have all sought PHR's forensic and research expertise. The organization's work has contributed to landmark decisions such as the 2016 conviction of Radovan Karadžić.

== Programs ==
=== International Forensics Program ===
Health professionals in PHR's International Forensics Program (IFP) use forensic investigations such as autopsies and medical and psychological evaluations, to determine the nature of abuse that victims have endured. These evaluations can then contribute to evidence for prosecutions or be used to bring attention to crimes. The IFP has performed forensic investigations for bodies such as the International Criminal Tribunal for the former Yugoslavia and the International Criminal Tribunal for Rwanda.

Experts in the IFP range from forensic pathologists to forensic anthropologists, as well as analytical scientists such as firearm examiners. They perform forensic investigations, evaluations, monitoring, or review of other parties' forensic work.

=== Forensic Training Institute ===
PHR launched the Forensic Training Institute (FTI) to strengthen local capacities for forensic investigations and documentation. The institute seeks to strengthen the ability of medical personnel to document torture, mass atrocities, sexual violence, and the persecution of health care workers. It also trains legal and law enforcement professionals who seek redress via local, national, and international justice mechanisms.

PHR's FTI program has partners in Afghanistan, Burma, the Democratic Republic of the Congo, Kenya, Kyrgyzstan, Syria, Tajikistan, and the United States. The program has specifically helped clinicians strengthen their interviewing techniques, physical examinations, evidence collection, crime scene documentation, forensic photography, and grave exhumation.

=== Program on Sexual Violence in Conflict Zones ===
PHR's Program on Sexual Violence in Conflict Zones was launched in 2011. The program strengthens cross-sectoral responses to sexual violence in the Democratic Republic of Congo and Kenya through training workshops for health care, law enforcement, and legal professionals. While PHR itself has engaged in many forensic investigations and advocacy efforts around rape in armed conflict, the Program on Sexual Violence in Conflict Zones builds local capacities for the collection of court-admissible evidence to support prosecutions for sexual violence crimes.

The program has an office at renowned gynecological surgeon Denis Mukwege's Panzi Hospital, in Bukavu, Democratic Republic of Congo. The Program on Sexual Violence in Conflict Zones partners with Panzi Hospital to train and mentor health workers, police officers, lawyers, and judges in effective documentation and prosecution of sexual violence.

To aid the documentation of sexual violence, PHR has developed MediCapt, an app allowing the secure digital recording and transmission of medical evidence.

=== Asylum Program ===
PHR's Asylum Program advocates for improved conditions in U.S. immigration detention centers and documents abuses suffered by asylum seekers in their home countries and in U.S. care. The network consists of hundreds of volunteer health professionals who provide medical evaluations to survivors of human rights violations, strengthening their applications for asylum in the United States.

PHR's documentation of abuses has involved investigations into the use of solitary confinement in immigration detention facilities, indefinite detention, and violations of the right to health in detention.

In 2010, PHR partnered with Weill Cornell Medicine to create the Weill Cornell Center for Human Rights (WCCHR), a medical student-run human rights clinic that assists survivors of torture seeking asylum in the United States.

=== U.S. Anti-Torture Program ===
PHR's U.S. Anti-Torture Program (ATP) was launched in 2003, after reports of torture by U.S. military personnel were first exposed. PHR published a series of investigative reports documenting the U.S. government's use of torture in pursuit of national security goals. "Break Them Down", published in 2005, found evidence of the systematic psychological torture employed by the military. Additional reports documented the severe physical and mental harm inflicted by interrogation practices and human experimentation in Guantanamo Bay.

=== Research and Investigations ===
The research and investigations department at PHR documents human rights abuses around the world. Their areas of research include attacks on health care and health personnel, mass atrocities, torture, and sexual violence across the globe. Notable investigations include:

1988 — PHR researchers uncover evidence of the Iraqi government using chemical weapons on their Kurdish citizens.

1996 — PHR teams exhumes mass graves in the Balkans. They provided evidence of ethnic cleansing to the International Criminal Tribunal for the former Yugoslavia (ICTY). This work contributed to the ICTY's conviction of Radovan Karadžić of war crimes, genocide, and crimes against humanity.

1996 — PHR sends a team to exhume mass graves in Rwanda and eventually provides forensic evidence to the International Criminal Tribunal for Rwanda.

2004 — PHR researchers investigate mass killings in Darfur. The organization is the first to call the events genocide.

2010 — PHR begins a successful global lobbying campaign to free Kamiar Alaei and Arash Alaei, brothers imprisoned in Iran for their work on the treatment of people with HIV/AIDS.

2011 — PHR researchers begin documenting assaults on Syrian health care workers and infrastructure, creating an interactive map of attacks and revealing the Syrian government's systemic targeting of hospitals and health workers.

2015 — PHR issues a report on the state of health care in eastern Aleppo city after almost five years of the Syrian conflict, revealing that almost 95% of doctors had fled, been detained, or been killed.

2019 — PHR published a report called My Only Crime Was That I Was a Doctor, about Assad's targeting of medical personnel and civilians in Syria.

2026 — PHR published a report in collaboration with the Human Rights Center at UC Berkeley called Charting the Crackdown: The misuse of crowd-control weapons in immigration enforcement protests across the United States, June 2025-June 2026, about use of force by law enforcement in the US mostly against protesters and journalists, especially at the June 2025 Los Angeles protests against mass deportation, during Operation Metro Surge in Minnesota, during Operation Midway Blitz in Chicago, at the 2025–2026 Portland, Oregon, protests, and at the Delaney Hall hunger strike and protests in New Jersey.

== National Student Program ==
PHR's National Student Program engages medical students and young health professionals in health and human rights work by organizing local action on human rights issues, raising awareness on campuses, organizing educational events, and calling on elected officials to take action. PHR has student chapters across the United States, and collaborates with them through PHR's university-affiliated asylum clinics and national student conferences.

The program has created tools and resources for student chapters covering topics such as medical professionalism, health and human rights education, and the Istanbul Protocol.

== Nobel Peace Prize ==
After their 1991 investigation of the health impact of land mines in Cambodia, PHR, in collaboration with Human Rights Watch, published the first report calling for a ban on landmines. In 1992, PHR helped form the International Campaign to Ban Landmines, participating in the talks that led to the Ottawa Treaty. For their work, PHR shared the 1997 Nobel Peace Prize "for their work for the banning and clearing of anti-personnel mines."
