= Roy Lucas (lawyer) =

American lawyer

Roy Lucas (November 27, 1941 – October 31, 2003) was an American lawyer and abortion rights activist, known for drafting a law review that laid the theoretical background behind the principles articulated in Roe v. Wade.

Lucas graduated from New York University Law School in 1967. He was teaching at the University of Alabama when he wrote "Federal Constitutional Limitations on the Enforcement and Administration of State Abortion Statutes" in the North Carolina Law Review in 1968.

Lucas established the James Madison Constitutional Law Institute to work for women's abortion rights and was instrumental in numerous abortion rights cases in the 1960s and 1970s, including Roe v. Wade. After 1986, he focused primarily on art, painting, and writing about art, while continuing to write about abortion.

He died of a heart attack on October 31, 2003.

== Bibliography ==
- "Federal Constitutional Limitations on the Enforcement and Administration of State Abortion Statutes," 46 North Carolina Law Review 730 (June 1968)

== Further research ==
- David Garrow, Liberty and Sexuality: The Right to Privacy and the Making of Roe v. Wade (University of California Press, 1998).
- David Garrow, How Roe v. Wade Was Written, 71 Wash. & Lee L. Rev. 893 (2013)
- A. Raymond Randolph, "Address: Before Roe v. Wade: Judge Friendly's Draft Abortion Opinion", Harvard Journal of Law & Public Policy (Summer 2006), v.29, n.3, pp. 1035–1062 (an unpublished draft opinion in an abortion rights case, preceded by a lengthy commentary from a conservative jurist discussing the history of abortion rights jurisprudence)
- Self, Robert O. (September 22, 2012). "How Choice Won". Salon.com. Archived from the original on September 23, 2012.

Research Libraries

- "Abortion Litigation Papers of Roy Lucas", Collection at Wesleyan University
