= Alan Frank Guttmacher =

American obstetrician and gynecologist (1898–1974)

President of Planned Parenthood
- In office June 20, 1962 – April 13, 1968
- Preceded by: Margaret Sanger

Personal details
- Born: May 19, 1898
- Died: March 18, 1974 (aged 75)

Alan Frank Guttmacher (May 19, 1898 – March 18, 1974) was an American obstetrician/gynecologist. He served as president of Planned Parenthood and vice-president of the American Eugenics Society. Guttmacher founded the American Association of Planned Parenthood Physicians, now known as the Association of Reproductive Health Professionals, as a forum for physicians to discuss the birth control pill and other advances in the field. He founded the Association for the Study of Abortion in 1964. He was a member of the Association for Voluntary Sterilization. The Guttmacher Institute is named after him.

In 1973, Guttmacher was one of the signers of the Humanist Manifesto II.

== Family ==
Guttmacher was born in 1898 to Rabbi Adolf Guttmacher, and Laura (Oppenheimer) Guttmacher, German Jewish emigrants. His twin brother, Manfred Guttmacher, was an advisor to the Baltimore City's Supreme Bench as a psychiatrist. Their older sister, Dorothy Emma Guttmacher, owned the Tudor Flower Shops at Johns Hopkins Hospital. Alan married Leonore Gidding in 1926 and together they raised three daughters, Ann (Loeb), Sally (Holtzman), and Susan (Green).

== Professional history ==
Guttmacher was a graduate of Johns Hopkins University and the Hopkins Medical School. He served as Director of Obstetrics and Gynecology and was appointed Obstetrician and Gynecologist-In-Chief at Mount Sinai Hospital in New York for approximately ten years. In 1962, ten years after moving to New York, he became president of the Planned Parenthood Federation. He extended this endeavor by founding the Association of Planned Parenthood Physicians which included scientists and medical practitioners. From 1964 to 1968, he served as Chairman of the Medical Committee of the International Planned Parenthood Federation. Guttmacher was also a fellow of the American College of Obstetrics and Gynecologists, the American Fertility Society, New York Academy of Medicine, and the American Association of Obstetricians and Gynecologists.
