= List of events in NHGRI history =

Important events in the history of the National Human Genome Research Institute at the National Institutes of Health.

== 1988 ==
- February 29 – March 1, 1988 – National Institutes of Health (NIH) Director James Wyngaarden assembles scientists, administrators and science policy experts in Reston, Va., to lay out a plan for the Human Genome Project (HGP).
- August 15, 1988 – A program advisory committee on the human genome is established to advise the National Institutes of Health (NIH) on all aspects of research in the area of genomic analysis.
- October 1, 1988 – The Office for Human Genome Research is created within the Office of the Director, National Institutes of Health (NIH). Also, NIH and the Department of Energy (DOE) sign a memorandum of understanding to "coordinate research and technical activities related to the human genome."

== 1989 ==
- January 3–4, 1989 – The program advisory committee on the human genome holds its first meeting in Bethesda, MD.
- October 1, 1989 – The National Center for Human Genome Research (NCHGR) is established to carry out the National Institutes of Health's (NIH) component of the United States Human Genome Project. The center's first director is James D. Watson, co-discoverer with Francis Crick of the double-helical structure of DNA.

== 1990 ==
- April 1990 – A five-year plan with specific goals for the project is published.
- May 8, 1990 – The National Advisory Council for Human Genome Research is established.
- July 1, 1990 – The Genome Research Review Committee is created so the National Center for Human Genome Research (NCHGR) can conduct appropriate peer review of human genome grant applications.
- October 1, 1990 – The Human Genome Project officially begins.

== 1991 ==
- January 22, 1991 – The National Advisory Council for Human Genome Research meets for the first time in Bethesda, MD.

== 1992 ==
- April 10, 1992 – James Watson resigns as first director of the National Center for Human Genome Research (NCHGR). Michael Gottesman is appointed acting NCHGR director.

== 1993 ==
- February 1993 – The Division of Intramural Research (DIR) within the National Center for Human Genome Research (NCHGR) is established.
- April 4, 1993 – Francis S. Collins is appointed National Center for Human Genome Research (NCHGR) director.
- October 1, 1993 – The United States Human Genome Project revises its five-year goals through September 1998.

== 1994 ==
- September 30, 1994 – Human genetic mapping goal achieved one year ahead of schedule.

== 1995 ==
- November 15, 1995 – National Center for Human Genome Research (NCHGR) celebrates its 5th anniversary. James D. Watson Lecture is established.
- April 1995 – The Task Force on Genetic Testing is established as a subgroup of the National Institutes of Health (NIH)/Department of Energy (DOE) Ethical, Legal and Social Implications (ELSI) Working Group.

== 1996 ==
- April 11, 1996 – Human DNA sequencing begins with pilot studies at six universities in the United States.
- April 24, 1996 – An international team completes the DNA sequence of the first eukaryotic genome, Saccharomyces cerevisiae, or common brewer's yeast.
- September 1996 – The Center for Inherited Disease Research [cidr.jhmi.edu] (CIDR), a project co-funded by eight National Institutes of Health (NIH) institutes and centers to study the genetic components of complex disorders, is established on the Johns Hopkins Bayview Medical Center campus in Baltimore.
- October 1996 – Scientists from government, university and commercial laboratories around the world reveal a map that pinpoints the locations of over 16,000 genes in human DNA.
- November 1996 – National Center for Human Genome Research and other researchers identify the location of the first gene associated with Parkinson's disease.
- November 1996 – National Center for Human Genome Research and other researchers identify the location of the first major gene that predisposes men to prostate cancer.
- December 1996 – ELSI Report is issued by the Joint National Institutes of Health/Department of Energy Committee evaluating the Ethical, Legal and Social Implications program of the Human Genome Project.

== 1997 ==
- January 1997 – Department of Health and Human Services (DHHS) Secretary Donna E. Shalala signs documents giving National Center for Human Genome Research (NCHGR) a new name and new "status" among other research institutes at the National Institutes of Health (NIH). The new name, the National Human Genome Research Institute (NHGRI), more accurately reflects its growth and accomplishments. As an institute, NHGRI can more appropriately interact with other federal agencies and share equal standing with other institutes at NIH.
- March 1997 – A government-citizen group suggests policies to limit genetic discrimination in the workplace.
- May 1997 – The National Human Genome Research Institute (NHGRI) and other scientists show that three specific alterations in the breast cancer genes BRCA1 and BRCA2 are associated with an increased risk of breast, ovarian and prostate cancers.
- June 1997 – The National Human Genome Research Institute (NHGRI) scientists precisely identify a gene abnormality that causes some cases of Parkinson's disease.
- July 1997 – A map of human chromosome 7 is completed.
- August 1997 – NHGRI Office of Science Education (OSE) launches first Genomics Short Course for college teachers at NIH.
- December 1997 – The National Human Genome Research Institute (NHGRI) and other researchers identify an altered gene that causes Pendred syndrome, an inherited form of deafness.

== 1998 ==
- March 1998 – Vice President Al Gore announces that the Clinton administration is calling for legislation to bar employers from discriminating against workers in hiring or promotion because of their genetic makeup.
- September 1998 – At a meeting of the main advisory body for the Human Genome Project (HGP), project planners present a new plan to produce a "finished" version of the DNA sequence of the human genome by the end of 2003, two years ahead of its original schedule. The HGP plans to generate a "working draft" in 2001 that, together with the finished sequence, will cover at least 90 percent of the genome. The working draft will be immediately valuable to researchers and will form the basis for a high-quality, finished genome sequence.
- September 1998 – A major international collaborative research study finds the site of a gene for susceptibility to prostate cancer on the X chromosome. This is the first time a gene for a common type of cancer is mapped to the X chromosome.
- September 1998 – NHGRI Office of Science Education releases first online version of "Talking Glossary of Genetics" in English. Spanish language version follow in 18 months.
- October 1998 – The National Institutes of Health (NIH) and the Department of Energy (DOE) develop a new five-year plan for the Human Genome Project (HGP). This plan, published in the October 23 issue of the journal Science [scienceonline.org], is designed to carry the project forward for the next five years, fiscal years 1999 through 2003.
- December 1998 – The genome of the tiny roundworm (Caenorhabditis elegans) is sequenced by researchers from the National Human Genome Research Institute (NHGRI) and other Human Genome Project (HGP)-funded scientists.

== 1999 ==
- March 1999 – Large-scale sequencing of the human genome begins.
- September 1999 – Human Genome Project (HGP) scientists confirm they are on schedule to produce the working draft of the genetic blueprint of humankind by spring 2000.
- October 1999 – President Clinton and First Lady Hillary Clinton host the eighth Millennium Evening at the White House. The program is titled "Informatics Meets Genomics."
- November 12, 1999 – The National Human Genome Research Institute (NHGRI) hosts the first annual "Consumer Day" conference to inform patients, families and health care providers about the impact of the Human Genome Project (HGP).
- November 1999 – The National Human Genome Research Institute (NHGRI), Department of Energy (DOE) and the Wellcome Trust hold a celebration of the completion and deposition into GenBank of one billion base pairs of the human genome DNA sequence.
- December 1999 – The National Human Genome Research Institute (NHGRI) and other Human Genome Project (HGP)-funded scientists unravel for the first time the genome of an entire human chromosome. The findings are reported in the December 2 issue of Nature.

== 2000 ==
- February 2000 – President Clinton signs Executive Order to prevent genetic discrimination in any federal workplace.
- March 2000 – Public consortium of scientists and a private company release a substantially complete genome sequence of the fruitfly (Drosophila melanogaster). The findings are reported in the March 24 issue of Science [scienceonline.org].
- April 3–6, 2000 – The National Human Genome Research Institute (NHGRI), the National Institutes of Health (NIH) Office of Rare Disease Research, and the Don and Linda Carter Foundation sponsor the first NIH Conference on Holoprosencephaly.
- May 2000 – Scientists in Japan and Germany report in the May 18 issue of Nature that they have unraveled the genome of human chromosome 21, already known to be involved with Down syndrome, Alzheimer's disease, Usher syndrome and Lou Gehrig's disease.
- June 2000 – The Human Genome Project (HGP) consortium announces a major milestone: It has assembled 85 percent of the sequence of the human genome – the genetic blueprint for a human being.
- August 2000 – Scientists discover a genetic "signature" that may help explain how melanoma – a deadly form of skin cancer – can spread to other parts of the body. Findings are reported in the August 3 issue of Nature. [nature.com]
- October 2000 – The National Institutes of Health (NIH), the Wellcome Trust, and three private companies collaborate to form the Mouse Genome Sequencing Consortium (MGSC) to accelerate the determination of the DNA sequence of the mouse genome.
- October 2000 – The Human Genome Project (HGP) is the recipient of the American Society of Human Genetics' Allan Award to honor the hundreds of scientists involved in deciphering the human genome.

== 2001 ==
- January 16–18, 2001 – The Ethical, Legal and Social Implications (ELSI) Research Programs of The National Human Genome Research Institute (NHGRI) and the Department of Energy (DOE) sponsor a conference to celebrate a decade of research and consider its impact on genetic research, health and policy.
- February 2001 – The International Human Genome Sequencing Consortium publishes a series of scientific papers in the February 15 issue of Nature, providing the first analysis of the human genome sequence that describes how it is organized and how it evolved. One significant discovery reveals that there are only 30,000 to 40,000 genes, not 100,000 as previously thought.
- February 2001 – National Human Genome Research Institute (NHGRI) scientists use microarray technology to develop a gene test that differentiates hereditary from sporadic types of breast cancer. Findings are reported in the February 22 issue of The New England Journal of Medicine.
- March 2001 – National Human Genome Research Institute (NHGRI) and Human Genome Project (HGP)-funded scientists find a new tumor suppressor gene involved in breast, prostate and other cancers on human chromosome 7. A single post-doc, using the "working draft" sequence data, is able to pin down the gene within weeks; before, the same work took several years and the work of many scientists. Findings are reported in the April issue of Nature Genetics.
- May 2001 – The Mouse Genome Sequencing Consortium (MGSC) announces it has achieved three-fold coverage of the mouse DNA sequence. The data, representing 95 percent of the mouse sequence, are publicly available [trace.ensembl.org] and will be an important tool for discovering human genes when comparing the genomes of the mouse and human.
- May 2001 – The National Human Genome Research Institute (NHGRI) and scientists at Sweden's Lund University develop a method of accurately diagnosing four complex, hard-to-distinguish childhood cancers using microarray technology and artificial neural networks (ANN). Findings are published in the June issue of Nature [nature.com].
- September 2001 – The National Human Genome Research Institute (NHGRI) announces the first Centers of Excellence in Genomic Science (CEGS) Award, a research program that supports multi-investigator, interdisciplinary teams who develop innovative genomic approaches that address important biological and biomedical research problems and seek to change the way genomics is done and used in biomedicine.
- November 9–11, 2001 – The National Human Genome Research Institute (NHGRI) co-sponsors The Human Genome Project Conference: The Challenges and Impact of Human Genome Research for Minority Communities, along with the Zeta Phi Beta sorority the National Education Foundation, the National Human Genome Center at Howard University, and the Family Life Center Foundation at Shiloh Baptist Church.
- December 12–14, 2001 – The National Human Genome Research Institute (NHGRI) holds the planning conference, Beyond the Beginning: The Future of Genomics at the Airlie Conference Center in Warrenton, Virginia, to develop a broad vision of the future of genomics research that will lay the foundation for a bold new plan for NHGRI.

== 2002 ==
- January 2002 – The National Human Genome Research Institute (NHGRI) and other scientists find a gene on chromosome 1 associated with an inherited form of prostate cancer in some families. The findings are published in the February issue of Nature Genetics.
- February 2002 – The National Human Genome Research Institute (NHGRI) and the NIH Office of Rare Diseases (ORD) launch the Genetics and Rare Diseases Information Center (GARD), delivering free and accurate information to patients and their families about genetic and rare diseases.
- May 2002 – The Mouse Genome Sequencing Consortium (MGSC) announces a 96 percent complete working draft of the mouse genome freely available in public databases [ensembl.org]. The methods to sequence the mouse genome set a new standard for speed and accuracy.
- June 2002 – The National Human Genome Research Institute (NHGRI) launches a new Web site, www.genome.gov, that provides improved usability and easy access to new content for a wide range of users.
- September 2002 – Alan Edward Guttmacher, M.D. is named as the second deputy director of the National Human Genome Research Institute (NHGRI). Vence L. Bonham Jr., J.D., is appointed as NHGRI's Senior Consultant to the Director on Health Disparities.
- September 2002 – Gene discovery by an international team of researchers led by the National Human Genome Research Institute (NHGRI), reveals the cause for a rare form of microcephaly, a devastating brain disorder.
- October 2002 – The National Human Genome Research Institute (NHGRI) launches the International HapMap Project, this new venture is aimed at speeding the discovery of genes related to common illnesses such as asthma, cancer, diabetes and heart disease.
- October 2002 – The National Human Genome Research Institute (NHGRI), in cooperation with five other institutes and centers at the National Institutes of Health (NIH), awards a three-year, $15-million grant to combine three of the world's current protein sequence databases into a single global resource.
- November 2002 – The National Human Genome Research Institute (NHGRI) selects Eric D. Green, M.D., Ph.D., as the new scientific director for the NHGRI, and William A. Gahl, M.D., Ph.D., as its new intramural clinical director.
- December 2002 – The international Mouse Genome Sequencing Consortium (MGSC) announces the publication of a high-quality draft sequence of the mouse genome – the genetic blueprint of a mouse.

== 2003 ==
- February 2003 – The National Human Genome Research Institute (NHGRI) and the Department of Energy (DOE) announce April 2003 events to celebrate the 50th anniversary of the discovery of the DNA double helix, the completion of the human genome sequence and the publication of the vision plan for NHGRI.
- March 2003 – The National Human Genome Research Institute (NHGRI) announces a new project – the ENCODE (ENCyclopedia Of DNA Elements) Project – with the long-term goal of creating a comprehensive encyclopedia of functional elements encoded in the human DNA.
- April 2003 – The National Human Genome Research Institute (NHGRI) celebrates the completion of the human genome sequence, the 50th anniversary of the description of the DNA double helix and the publication of the vision document for the future of genomics research.
- April 2003 – National Human Genome Research Institute (NHGRI) researchers identify the gene that causes the premature aging disorder progeria. The findings were released online in the journal Nature [nature.com].
- June 2003 – National Human Genome Research Institute (NHGRI) study findings, reported in the June 13 issue of Science [scienceonline.org], will aid researchers in discovering safer methods of gene therapy.
- June 2003 – A detailed analysis of the just-completed sequence of the human Y chromosome – a study published in the June issue of Nature [nature.com], and funded in large part by the National Human Genome Research Institute (NHGRI) – shows the Y chromosome appears to exchange genes between the two copies of repeated sequences that lie near to each other as mirror images.
- July 2003 – A detailed analysis of the reference sequence of chromosome 7, carried out by a multinational team of scientists led by the Washington University School of Medicine, uncovers structural features that appear to promote genetic changes that can cause disease. The findings were reported in the July 10 issue of the journal Nature [nature.com]. National Human Genome Research Institute (NHGRI) Scientific Director Eric Green co-authored the study.
- August 2003 – A team of researchers led by the National Human Genome Research Institute (NHGRI) reports findings on the comparison of 13 vertebrate genomes. Results, published in the August 14 issue of Nature [nature.com], suggested that comparison of a wide variety of species' genomes will not only illuminate genomic evolution but help identify functional elements in the human genome.
- October 2003 – The National Human Genome Research Institute (NHGRI) announced the first grants in a three-year, $36 million scientific reconnaissance mission – called ENCODE – aimed at discovering all parts of the human genome that are crucial to biological function.
- October 14, 2003 – The U.S. Senate passes the Genetic Information Nondiscrimination Act of 2003 (S. 1053) [thomas.loc.gov] by a vote of 95–0, the first time the Senate has passed a bipartisan, genetic nondiscrimination bill. The bill prevents health insurers and employers from using genetic information to determine eligibility, set premiums, or hire and fire people. The bill faces approval in the House of Representatives and from the President.
- November 7, 2003 – The National Human Genome Research Institute (NHGRI) announces the selection of five centers to carry out a new generation of large-scale sequencing projects designed to maximize the promise of the Human Genome Project and dramatically expand our understanding of human health and disease.
- December 5, 2003 – The National Human Genome Research Institute (NHGRI) announces the formation of a new branch – the Social and Behavioral Research Branch (SBRB) – within its Division of Intramural Research (DIR).
- December 10, 2003 – The National Human Genome Research Institute (NHGRI) announces the first draft version of the chimpanzee genome sequence and its alignment with the human genome.
- December 17, 2003 – The International HapMap Consortium publishes a paper that sets forth the scientific rationale and strategy behind its effort to create a map of human genetic variation.

== 2004 ==
- January 7, 2004 – The National Human Genome Research Institute announces that the first draft version of the honey bee genome sequence has been deposited into free public databases.
- January 26, 2004 – The National Human Genome Research Institute and other scientists successfully create transgenic animals using sperm genetically modified and grown in a laboratory dish, an achievement with implications for wide ranging research, from developmental biology to gene therapy. The study [pnas.org] was published in the online edition of the Proceedings of the National Academy of Sciences.
- February 3, 2004 – The Genetic and Rare Diseases Information Center (GARD), established by the National Human Genome Research Institute (NHGRI) and NIH Office of Rare Diseases (ORD), announces it has expanded its efforts to enable healthcare workers, patients and families who speak Spanish to take advantage of its free services.
- February 25, 2004 – The National Human Genome Research Institute's (NHGRI) Large-Scale Sequencing Research Network announces it will begin sequencing the genome of the first marsupial, the gray short-tailed South American opossum, and more than a dozen other model organisms to further advance our understanding of the human genome.
- March 1, 2004 – The National Human Genome Research Institute (NHGRI) announces that the first draft version of the chicken genome sequence has been deposited into free public databases.
- March 11, 2004 – National Human Genome Research Institute (NHGRI) and other scientists find variants in a gene that may predispose people to type 2 diabetes, the most common form of the disease. Findings are reported in the April issue of Diabetes.
- March 24, 2004 – The National Human Genome Research Institute (NHGRI) announces that the International Sequencing Consortium has launched a free online resource, where scientists and the public can view the latest information on sequencing projects for animal, plant and eukaryotic genomes.
- March 31, 2004 – The International Rat Genome Sequencing Project Consortium announces the publication of a high-quality draft sequence of the rat genome. Findings are reported in the April 1 issue of Nature.
- June 8, 2004 – The National Human Genome Research Institute (NHGRI) and the Melbourne-based Australian Genome Research Facility Ltd. (AGRF) announces a partnership to sequence the genome of the tammar wallaby, a member of the kangaroo family.
- June 28, 2004 – The National Human Genome Research Institute (NHGRI) announces it has established two new Centers of Excellence in Genomic Science (CEGS) at Harvard Medical School in Boston and the Johns Hopkins University School of Medicine in Baltimore.
- July 14, 2004 – The National Human Genome Research Institute (NHGRI) announces that the first draft version of the dog genome sequence has been deposited into free public databases.
- July 19, 2004 – The National Human Genome Research Institute (NHGRI) launches the NHGRI Policy and Legislative Database, an online resource that will enable researchers, health professionals and the general public to more easily locate information on laws and policies related to a wide array of genetic issues
- July 26, 2004 – National Human Genome Research Institute (NHGRI) scientists and an interdisciplinary consortium of researchers from 11 universities and institutions discover a possible inherited component for lung cancer, a disease normally associated with external causes, such as cigarette smoking. Findings are reported in the online edition of the American Journal of Human Genetics.
- August 4, 2004 – The National Human Genome Research Institute's (NHGRI) Large-Scale Sequencing Research Network announces a comprehensive strategic plan to sequence 18 additional organisms, including the African savannah elephant, domestic cat and orangutan, to help interpret the human genome.
- August 31, 2004 – The National Human Genome Research Institute (NHGRI) launches four interdisciplinary Centers for Excellence in Ethical, Legal and Social Implications Research to address some of the most pressing ethical, legal and social questions raised by recent advances in genetic and genomic research.
- October 6, 2004 – The National Human Genome Research Institute (NHGRI) announces that the first draft version of the bovine genome sequence has been deposited into free public databases.
- October 14, 2004 – The National Human Genome Research Institute (NHGRI) awards more than $38 million in grants to develop new sequencing technologies to accomplish the near-term goal of sequencing a mammalian-sized genome for $100,000 and the longer-term challenge of sequencing an individual human genome for $1,000 or less.
- October 18, 2004 – The National Human Genome Research Institute (NHGRI) announces that two of its medical geneticists, Dr. Alan Edward Guttmacher and Dr. Robert Nussbaum, are elected to the Institute of Medicine of the National Academies.
- October 21, 2004 – The International Human Genome Sequencing Consortium, led in the United States by the National Human Genome Research Institute (NHGRI) and the Department of Energy (DOE) publishes its scientific description of the finished human genome sequence, reducing the estimated number of human protein-coding genes from 35,000 to only 20,000–25,000, a surprisingly low number for our species. Findings are reported in the October 21 issue of Nature.
- October 22, 2004 – The ENCODE Consortium publishes a paper in the October 22 issue of Science that sets forth the scientific rationale and strategy behind its quest to produce a comprehensive catalog of all parts of the human genome crucial to biological function.
- November 8, 2004 – The National Human Genome Research Institute (NHGRI) partners with the Department of Health and Human Services and the Office of the Surgeon General to launch a free computer program, My Family Health Portrait, which the public can use to record important family health information that may identify common diseases that run in families.
- December 8, 2004 – The National Human Genome Research Institute (NHGRI) and the International Chicken Genome Sequencing Consortium announces the publication of an analysis comparing the chicken and human genomes. It is the first bird to have its genome sequenced and analyzed. Findings are reported in the December 9 issue of Nature.
- December 10, 2004 – The International HapMap Consortium announces the end of any restrictions on data generated by its effort to create a map of human genetic variation. As a result, all of the consortium's data are now completely available to the public, a move that will provide researchers with even easier access to tools for identifying genetic contributions to disease.

== 2005 ==
- February 7, 2005: The International HapMap Consortium announces plans to create an even more powerful map of human genetic variation than originally envisioned. The map will accelerate the discovery of genes related to common diseases, such as asthma, cancer, diabetes and heart disease.
- March 6, 2005: As part of the Human Genome Project, NIH hails the first comprehensive analysis of the sequence of the human X chromosome, saying that this provides sweeping new insights into the evolution of sex chromosomes and the biological differences between males and females.
- August 8, 2005: NHGRI announces it has awards grants totaling more than $32 million to advance the development of innovative sequencing technologies intended to reduce the cost of DNA sequencing and expand the use of genomics in biomedical research and health care.
- August 9, 2005: In a surprising development, a research team led by NHGRI finds that a class of experimental anti-cancer drugs shows promise in laboratory studies for treating the fatal genetic disorder that causes premature aging.
- August 1, 2005: The first comprehensive comparison of the genetic blueprints of humans and chimpanzees shows our closest living relatives share perfect identity with 96 percent of our DNA sequence.
- October 5, 2005: The National Institutes of Health (NIH) announces contracts that will give researchers unprecedented access to two private collections of knockout mice, providing valuable models for the study of human disease and laying the groundwork for a public, genome-wide library of knockout mice.
- October 6, 2005: The International HapMap Consortium publishes a comprehensive catalog of human genetic variation, a landmark achievement that is already accelerating the search for genes involved in common diseases, such as asthma, diabetes, cancer and heart disease.
- November 5, 2005: As part of the U.S. Surgeon General's Family Health Initiative, an updated version of the computerized tool designed to help families gather their health information is unveiled.
- December 3, 2005: The National Cancer Institute (NCI) and the National Human Genome Research Institute (NHGRI) launches a comprehensive effort to accelerate understanding of the molecular basis of cancer through the application of genome analysis technologies, especially large-scale genome sequencing.

== 2006 ==
- February 8, 2006: The Department of Health and Human Services (HHS) announces the creation of two new, closely related initiatives to speed up research on the causes of common diseases such as asthma, arthritis and Alzheimer's disease.
- March 9, 2006: A multi-institution team of experts, coordinated by geneticists from the NHGRI, supports efforts to identify more than 70 bodies still unidentified in the aftermath of Hurricane Katrina.
- July 8, 2006: Researchers have found that genetic alterations originally identified in people suffering from a rare disease may also be an important risk factor for the second most common form of dementia among the elderly.
- July 4, 2006: Researchers at the National Institutes of Health Chemical Genomics Center (NCGC) – an NHGRI Affiliated Center – develop a new screening approach that can profile compounds in large chemical libraries more accurately and precisely than standard methods, speeding the production of data that can be used to probe biological activities and identify leads for drug discovery.
- August 21, 2006: The National Human Genome Research Institute (NHGRI), part of the National Institutes of Health (NIH), announces grants totaling $54 million over five years to establish one new Center of Excellence in Genomic Science (CEGS) and continue support for two existing centers.
- September 13, 2006: The National Cancer Institute (NCI) and the National Human Genome Research Institute (NHGRI) announce the first three cancers that will be studied in the pilot phase of The Cancer Genome Atlas (TCGA). The cancers to be studied in the TCGA Pilot Project are lung, brain (glioblastoma) and ovarian.
- October 4, 2006: The National Human Genome Research Institute (NHGRI) announces the latest round of grant awards totaling more than $13 million to speed the development of innovative sequencing technologies that reduce the cost of DNA sequencing and expand the use of genomics in medical research and health care.
- October 16, 2006: The National Cancer Institute (NCI) and the National Human Genome Research Institute (NHGRI) announce another two of the components of The Cancer Genome Atlas (TCGA) Pilot Project, a three-year, $100 million collaboration to test the feasibility of using large-scale genome analysis technologies to identify important genetic changes involved in cancer.
- November 15, 2006: New Family Health History projects focus on Alaska Native, Appalachian communities. As part of the effort to educate all Americans about the importance of knowing their family health histories, Acting Surgeon General Kenneth P. Moritsugu, M.D., M.P.H., announces two new outreach projects involving Alaska Native and urban Appalachian communities.

== 2007 ==
- January 15, 2007: Scientists find new genetic clue to cause Alzheimer's Disease. Variations in a gene known as SORL1 may be a factor in the development of late onset Alzheimer's disease, an international team of researchers has discovered.
- April 26, 2007: Researchers identify new genetic risk factors for type 2 diabetes. In the most comprehensive look at genetic risk factors for type 2 diabetes to date, a U.S.-Finnish team, working in close collaboration with two other groups, has identified at least four new genetic variants associated with increased risk of diabetes and confirmed existence of another six.
- May 4, 2007: The National Human Genome Research Institute (NHGRI) and the National Cancer Institute (NCI), have teamed with Group Health Cooperative in Seattle and Henry Ford Health System in Detroit to launch the Multiplex Initiative, a study to investigate the interest level of healthy, young adults in receiving genetic testing for eight common conditions.

== 2008 ==
- May 28, 2008 – Francis S. Collins steps down as Director of National Human Genome Research Institute after 15 years.
- August 2, 2008 – Alan Edward Guttmacher becomes Acting Director of NHGRI. He replaces Francis S. Collins, M.D., Ph.D., who stepped down after 15 years at the helm of NHGRI to pursue other professional opportunities.

== 2009 ==
- August 7, 2009 – the U.S. Senate confirms that former NHGRI Director Francis S. Collins, M.D., Ph.D., will be the director of the National Institutes of Health (NIH ). President Barack Obama announced the nomination of Dr. Collins on July 8. Dr. Collins, a physician-geneticist who led NHGRI from 1993 to 2008, managed the NIH component of the international Human Genome Project.
- November 7. NIH Appoints Eric D. Green, M.D., Ph.D. to be Director of the National Human Genome Research Institute. It is the first time an institute director has risen to lead the entire NIH and subsequently picked his own successor.

== See also ==
- National Human Genome Research Institute
- National Institutes of Health
