= Francis Collins =

American physician-scientist (born 1950)

Science Advisor to the President
- Acting; February 18, 2022 – October 3, 2022
- President: Joe Biden
- Preceded by: Eric Lander
- Succeeded by: Arati Prabhakar

16th Director of the National Institutes of Health
- In office August 17, 2009 – December 19, 2021
- President: Barack Obama; Donald Trump; Joe Biden
- Deputy: Lawrence A. Tabak
- Preceded by: Raynard S. Kington (acting)
- Succeeded by: Lawrence A. Tabak (acting)

2nd Director of the National Human Genome Research Institute
- In office April 1993 – August 1, 2008
- President: Bill Clinton; George W. Bush
- Preceded by: Michael M. Gottesman (acting)
- Succeeded by: Alan Edward Guttmacher (acting)

Personal details
- Born: Francis Sellers Collins; April 14, 1950 (age 76) Staunton, Virginia, U.S.
- Spouse: Diane Baker
- Children: 2
- Education: University of Virginia (BS); Yale University (MS, PhD); University of North Carolina, Chapel Hill (MD)
- Scientific career
- Fields: Molecular genetics
- Workplaces: University of Michigan; National Human Genome Research Institute; National Institutes of Health
- Thesis: Semiclassical theory of vibrationally inelastic scattering, with application to H+ + H₂ (1974)
- Doctoral advisor: James Cross
- Francis Collins's voice Francis Collins speaks on the development of the COVID-19 vaccine. Recorded September 9, 2020

Francis Sellers Collins ForMemRS (born April 15, 1950) is an American physician-scientist who discovered the genes associated with a number of diseases and led the Human Genome Project. He served as director of the National Institutes of Health (NIH) in Bethesda, Maryland, from 17 August 2009 to 19 December 2021, serving under three presidents. Collins announced his retirement publicly from the NIH on March 1, 2025, after 32 years of service.

Before being appointed director of the NIH, Collins led the Human Genome Project and other genomics research initiatives as director of the National Human Genome Research Institute (NHGRI), one of the 27 institutes and centers at NIH. Before joining NHGRI, he earned a reputation as a gene hunter at the University of Michigan. He has been elected to the Institute of Medicine and the National Academy of Sciences, and has received the Presidential Medal of Freedom and the National Medal of Science.

Collins has written books on science, medicine, and religion, including the New York Times bestseller The Language of God: A Scientist Presents Evidence for Belief. After leaving the directorship of NHGRI and before becoming director of the NIH, he founded and served as president of The BioLogos Foundation, which promotes discourse on the relationship between science and religion and advocates the perspective that belief in Christianity can be reconciled with acceptance of evolution and science, especially through the theistic evolution idea that the Creator brought about his plan through the processes of evolution. In 2009, Pope Benedict XVI appointed Collins to the Pontifical Academy of Sciences.

On October 5, 2021, Collins announced that he would resign as NIH director by the end of the year. Four months later in February 2022, he joined the Cabinet of Joe Biden as Acting Science Advisor to the President, replacing Eric Lander.

== Early life and education ==
Francis Sellers Collins was born in Staunton, Virginia, the youngest of four sons of Fletcher Collins and Margaret James Collins. Raised on a small farm in Virginia's Shenandoah Valley, Collins was home schooled until the sixth grade. He attended Robert E. Lee High School in Staunton, Virginia. Through most of his high school and college years he aspired to be a chemist, and he had little interest in what he then considered the "messy" field of biology. What he referred to as his "formative education" was received at the University of Virginia, where he earned a Bachelor of Science degree in chemistry in 1970. He went on to graduate as a Doctor of Philosophy in physical chemistry at Yale University in 1974.

During his time at Yale, a course in biochemistry sparked his interest in the subject. After consulting with his mentor from the University of Virginia, Carl Trindle, he changed fields and enrolled in medical school at the University of North Carolina School of Medicine, earning a Doctor of Medicine degree there in 1977. From 1978 to 1981, Collins served a residency and chief residency in internal medicine at North Carolina Memorial Hospital in Chapel Hill. He then returned to Yale, where he was a fellow in human genetics at the medical school from 1980 to 1983.

== Genetics research ==
At Yale, Collins worked under the direction of Sherman Weissman, and in 1984 the two published a paper, "Directional cloning of DNA fragments at a large distance from an initial probe: a circularization method". The method described was named chromosome jumping, to emphasize the contrast with an older and much more time-consuming method of copying DNA fragments called chromosome walking. Collins joined the University of Michigan faculty in 1984, rising to the rank of professor in internal medicine and human genetics. His gene-hunting approach, which he named "positional cloning", developed into a powerful component of modern molecular genetics.

Several scientific teams worked in the 1970s and 1980s to identify genes and their loci as a cause of cystic fibrosis. Progress was modest until 1985, when Lap-Chee Tsui and colleagues at Toronto's Hospital for Sick Children identified the locus for the gene. It was then determined that a shortcut was needed to speed the process of identification, so Tsui contacted Collins, who agreed to collaborate with the Toronto team and share his chromosome-jumping technique. The gene was identified in June 1989, and the results were published in the journal Science on September 8, 1989. This identification was followed by other genetic discoveries made by Collins and a variety of collaborators. They included isolation of the genes for Huntington's disease, neurofibromatosis, multiple endocrine neoplasia type 1, inv(16) AML and Hutchinson–Gilford progeria syndrome.

== Genomics ==
In 1992, National Institutes of Health Director Bernadine Healy appointed Collins to succeed James D. Watson as director of the National Center for Human Genome Research, which became National Human Genome Research Institute (NHGRI) in 1997. As director he oversaw the International Human Genome Sequencing Consortium, which was the group that successfully carried out the Human Genome Project. In 1994, Collins founded NHGRI's Division of Intramural Research, a collection of investigator-directed laboratories that conduct genome research on the NIH campus.

In June 2000 Collins was joined by President Bill Clinton and biologist Craig Venter in making the announcement of a working draft of the human genome. He stated that "It is humbling for me, and awe-inspiring to realize that we have caught the first glimpse of our own instruction book, previously known only to God." An initial analysis was published in February 2001, and scientists worked toward finishing the reference version of the human genome sequence by 2003, coinciding with the 50th anniversary of James D. Watson and Francis Crick's publication of the structure of DNA.

Another major activity at NHGRI during his tenure as director was the creation of the haplotype map of the human genome. This International HapMap Project produced a catalog of human genetic variations—called single-nucleotide polymorphisms—which is now being used to discover variants correlated with disease risk. Among the labs engaged in that effort is Collins's own lab at NHGRI, which has sought to identify and understand the genetic variations that influence the risk of developing type 2 diabetes.

In addition to his basic genetic research and scientific leadership, Collins is known for his close attention to ethical and legal issues in genetics. He has been a strong advocate for protecting the privacy of genetic information and has served as a national leader in securing the passage of the federal Genetic Information and Nondiscrimination Act, which prohibits gene-based discrimination in employment and health insurance. In 2013, spurred by concerns over the publication of the genome of the widely used HeLa cell line derived from the late Henrietta Lacks, Collins and other NIH leaders worked with the Lacks family to reach an agreement to protect their privacy, while giving researchers controlled access to the genomic data.

Building on his own experiences as a physician volunteer in a rural missionary hospital in Nigeria, Collins is also very interested in opening avenues for genome research to benefit the health of people living in developing nations. For example, in 2010, he helped establish an initiative called Human Heredity and Health in Africa (H3Africa) to advance African capacity and expertise in genomic science. Collins announced his resignation as NHGRI director on May 28, 2008, but continued to lead an active lab there with a research focus on progeria and type 2 diabetes until his resignation on February 28, 2025.

== NIH director ==
=== Nomination and confirmation ===
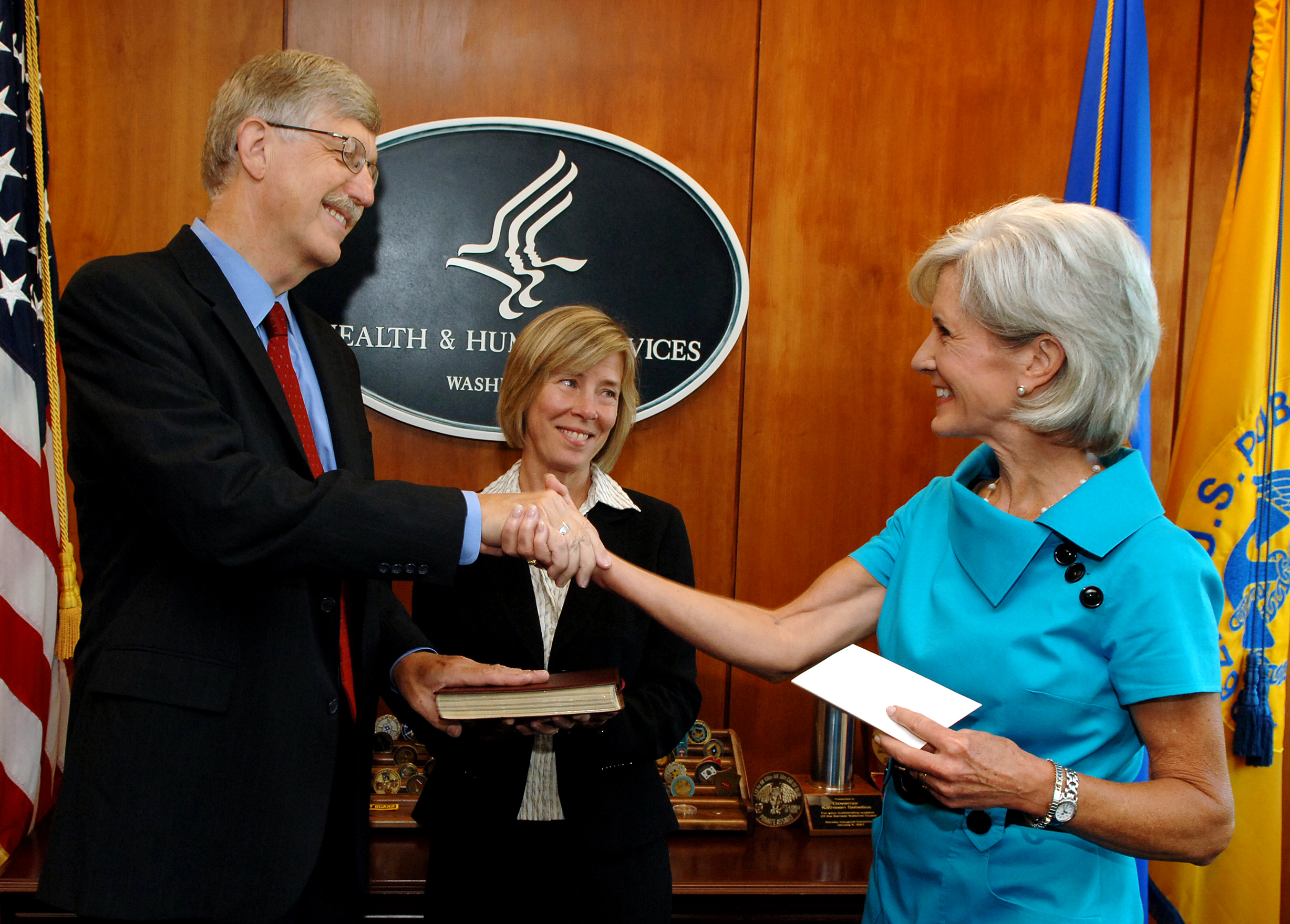
Collins with Health and Human Services Secretary Kathleen Sebelius after swearing-in ceremony

On July 8, 2009, President Barack Obama nominated Collins as director of the National Institutes of Health, and the Senate unanimously confirmed him for the post. He was sworn in by Health and Human Services Secretary Kathleen Sebelius on August 17, 2009. Science writer Jocelyn Kaiser opined that Collins was "known as a skilled administrator and excellent communicator", that Obama's nomination "did not come as a big surprise", and that the appointment "ignited a volley of flattering remarks from researchers and biomedical groups." She also wrote that Collins "does have his critics", some of them who were concerned with the new director's "outspoken Christian faith". Washington Post staffer David Brown wrote that Collins's status as a "born-again Christian ... may help him build bridges with those who view some gene-based research as a potential threat to religious values." Collins's appointment was welcomed by the chief executive officer of the American Association for the Advancement of Science, and by Bernadine Healy, the former head of the National Institutes of Health.

In October 2009, shortly after his appointment as NIH director, Collins stated in an interview in The New York Times: "I have made it clear that I have no religious agenda for the N.I.H., and I think the vast majority of scientists have been reassured by that and have moved on." On October 1, 2009, in the second of his four appearances on The Colbert Report, Collins discussed his leadership at the NIH and other topics such as personalized medicine and stem cell research. And, in November 2011, Collins was included on The New Republic's list of Washington's most powerful, least famous people. Collins appeared on the series finale of The Colbert Report, participating in a chorus with several other famous people singing "We'll Meet Again".

On June 6, 2017, President Donald Trump announced his selection of Collins to continue to serve as the NIH Director. On 19 December 2017, Collins and the NIH lifted the Obama moratorium on gain of function research because it was deemed to be "important in helping us identify, understand, and develop strategies and effective countermeasures against rapidly evolving pathogens that pose a threat to public health." In October 2020, Collins criticized the Great Barrington Declaration's "focused protection" herd immunity strategy, calling it "a fringe component of epidemiology. This is not mainstream science. It's dangerous. It fits into the political views of certain parts of our confused political establishment." In a private email to Fauci, Collins called the authors of the declaration "fringe epidemiologists" and said: "There needs to be a quick and devastating published take down of its premises." The Wall Street Journal's editorial board accused Collins of "work[ing] with the media to trash the Great Barrington Declaration" and of "Shut[ting] Down Covid Debate". On January 15, 2021, President-elect Joe Biden announced his selection of Collins to continue to serve as NIH Director. On October 5, 2021, Collins announced that he would resign as NIH director by the end of the year. His last day was 19 December 2021.

=== Projects ===
Collins was instrumental in establishing the National Center for Advancing Translational Sciences (NCATS) on December 23, 2011. In January 2013, Collins created two senior scientific positions on Big Data, as well as the diversity of the scientific workforce. Other projects he took on early in his tenure included increased support for Alzheimer's disease research, which was announced in May 2012; the Brain Research through Advancing Innovative Neurotechnologies (BRAIN) Initiative, announced by President Obama and Collins on April 2, 2013, at the White House; and in February 2014 the Accelerating Medicines Partnership (AMP), a public-private partnership between NIH, the U.S. Food and Drug Administration, 10 biopharmaceutical firms, and multiple non-profit organizations.

In 2014, Collins worked with the larger biomedical research community to create principles and guidelines to foster rigor and reproducibility in preclinical research, including incorporating sex as a biological variable to ensure differences in treatment response between men and women are addressed.

Beginning in 2014, the NIH provided multi-year grants to EcoHealth Alliance, which studied bat coronaviruses, including genetically engineering bat coronaviruses called WIV1, in collaboration with the Wuhan Institute of Virology. The grants were terminated in 2020 under the Donald Trump administration, during Trump's feud with China over the origins of COVID-19.

In January 2015, President Obama announced the NIH-led Precision Medicine Initiative (PMI), later renamed the All of Us Research Program, in his State of the Union address. All of Us sought to extend precision medicine to all diseases by building a national research cohort of 1 million or more U.S. participants. In other precedent-setting actions during his time as NIH director, Collins announced in November 2015 that NIH will no longer support any biomedical research involving chimpanzees.

In December 2015, Collins and other NIH leaders released a detailed plan that charted a course for NIH's efforts over the ensuing five years. The NIH-Wide Strategic Plan, Fiscal Years 2016-2020: Turning Discovery Into Health was aimed at ensuring the agency remains well positioned to capitalize on new opportunities for scientific exploration and to address new challenges for human health.

In January 2016, President Obama announced a new initiative to galvanize the nation's research efforts against cancer. Fueled by an additional $680 million in the proposed fiscal year 2017 budget for NIH, the National Cancer Moonshot Initiative aimed to accelerate progress toward the next generation of interventions to reduce cancer incidence and improve patient outcomes.

In 2016, Collins instituted a number of clinical trial reforms to enhance protection of participants in research and improve reporting of research results in ClinicalTrials.gov. In 2017, Collins implemented the Next Generation Researchers Initiative to improve the odds for early investigators to win NIH grants.

To support the Administration's Stop Opioid Abuse Initiative, Collins launched the NIH HEAL (Helping to End Addiction Long-term) Initiative in April 2018. The NIH HEAL Initiative bolstered research across NIH to improve treatments for opioid misuse and addiction and enhance pain management. Also in 2018, Collins launched an initiative to address sexual harassment in science and change a culture that sends messages to women and other underrepresented groups that they don't belong in biomedical research.

In October 2021, NIH principal deputy director Larry Tabak sent a letter to Kentucky Congressman James Comer addressing NIH grants to EcoHealth Alliance. Comer, who has held hearings criticizing the use of U.S. federal funds for research related to bat coronaviruses in China, subsequently accused Collins of having potentially misled the Oversight Committee Republicans as to EcoHealth Alliance's activities.

In 2023, the Biden administration announced an initiative to eliminate hepatitis C in the United States. Collins was the special advisor to President Biden on the hepatitis C elimination plan. Collins's wrote an op-ed in The New York Times on the elimination plan advocating that the U.S. commit the appropriate resources.

== Acting science advisor ==
On February 17, 2022, President Biden named Collins the acting science advisor to the president after Eric Lander resigned. He also serves as co-chair of the President's Council of Advisors on Science and Technology.

== Return to laboratory research and retirement ==
After he stepped down as the director of NIH in December 2021, Collins returned to his 12-person research lab at NHGRI. Except for an eight-month stint as the acting presidential science advisor, Collins performed full-time biomedical research until he announced his retirement on February 28, 2025. Collins did not give a reason for his abrupt departure.

In 2026, a book called 'Blockers' by Michael Lewis (author of books like 'Moneyball' and 'The Big Short') was published which described the campaign by the second Trump Administration to cut the civil service in its quest for 'efficiencies'. Francis Collins features in it and it alleges that he was 'forced out'. Lewis runs through a series of possible culprits, of which the cost-cutting is one. What makes this particularly ironic is that the Office of Management & Budget which implemented the cuts and most likely responsible for Collins' removal is run by Russell Vought, who has a daughter with cystic fibrosis.

== Music ==
Collins's love of guitar playing and motorcycle riding is often mentioned in articles about him.

While directing NHGRI, he formed a jazz band with other NIH scientists. Sometimes the band, called the Directors, dueled with a rock band from Johns Hopkins University led by cancer researcher Bert Vogelstein. Lyrics of the Directors' songs included spoofs of rock and gospel classics re-written to address the challenges of contemporary biomedical research. Collins has performed at TEDMED 2012, StandUpToCancer, The 2017 Southern Methodist University Commencement and Rock Stars of Science.

His passion for music also inspired him to partner with the Kennedy Center to expand the Sound Health Initiative, which was announced in February 2017. Sound Health aims to expand current knowledge and explore ways to enhance the potential for music as therapy for neurological and other disorders.

== Awards and honors ==
While leading the National Human Genome Research Institute, Collins was elected to the Institute of Medicine and the National Academy of Sciences. He was awarded the Canada Gairdner International Award in 1990. He was a Kilby International Awards recipient in 1993. Collins received the Golden Plate Award of the American Academy of Achievement in 1994. He received the Association for Molecular Pathology Award for Excellence in Molecular Diagnostics in 1998. He received the Biotechnology Heritage Award with J. Craig Venter in 2001, from the Biotechnology Industry Organization (BIO) and the Chemical Heritage Foundation. Collins and Venter shared the "Biography of the Year" title from A&E Network in 2000. In 2005, Collins and Venter were honored as two of "America's Best Leaders" by U.S. News & World Report and the Harvard University Center for Public Leadership.

In 2005 Collins received the William Allan Award from the American Society of Human Genetics. In 2007 he was presented with the Presidential Medal of Freedom by President George W. Bush. In 2008, he was awarded the Inamori Ethics Prize, as well as the National Medal of Science. Also in 2008, Collins and Steven Weinberg, a Nobel Prize recipient for physics, shared the Trotter Prize, and discussed the interplay between science and religion. Collins received the Albany Medical Center Prize in 2010 and the Pro Bono Humanum Award of the Galien Foundation in 2012, the Federation of American Societies for Experimental Biology (FASEB) Public Service Award in 2017, the Pontifical Key Scientific Award in 2018, and the Warren Alpert Foundation Prize in 2018. In 2020, he received the Templeton Prize, and was elected a Foreign Member of the Royal Society. On October 2, 2025, Collins was awarded an honorary doctorate from Whitworth University in Spokane, Washington, during an on-campus discussion titled, "The Road to Wisdom: On Truth, Science, Faith and Trust." Collins was the 2026 Public Welfare Medal recipient from the National Academy of Sciences.

== Views ==
=== Christianity ===
By graduate school, Collins considered himself agnostic. A conversation with a hospital patient led him to question his lack of religious views, and he investigated various faiths. He familiarized himself with the evidence for and against God in cosmology, and on the recommendation of a Methodist minister used Mere Christianity by C. S. Lewis as a foundation to develop his religious views. He believes that people cannot be converted to Christianity by reason and argument alone, and that the final stage of conversion entails a "leap of faith". After several years of deliberation, he finally converted to Christianity during a trip to the Cascade Mountains, where he describes a striking image of a frozen waterfall as removing his final resistance, resulting in his conversion the following morning. He has described himself as a "serious Christian".

In his 2006 book The Language of God: A Scientist Presents Evidence for Belief, Collins wrote that scientific discoveries were an "opportunity to worship" and that he rejected both Young Earth creationism and intelligent design. He wrote that his own belief was theistic evolution or evolutionary creation, which he preferred to call BioLogos. He wrote that one can "think of DNA as an instructional script, a software program, sitting in the nucleus of the cell." He appeared on The Colbert Report and on Fresh Air radio to discuss his book. In an interview with D. J. Grothe on the Point of Inquiry podcast, he said that the overall aim of the book was to show that "one can be intellectually in a rigorous position and argue that science and faith can be compatible", and that he was prompted to write the book because "most people are seeking a possible harmony between these worldviews [science and faith], and it seems rather sad that we hear so little about this possibility." Collins said he had been a Methodist, Presbyterian, Baptist, and Episcopalian, emphasizing that denominational differences were not essential to him. He recalled that, growing up, he participated in the choir of an Episcopal church.

Collins is a critic of intelligent design, and for this reason he was not asked to participate in the 2008 documentary Expelled: No Intelligence Allowed. Walt Ruloff, a producer for the film, stated that by rejecting intelligent design, Collins was "toeing the party line", a claim which Collins called "just ludicrous". In an interview he stated that "intelligent design is headed for collapse in the not too distant future" and that "science class ought to be about science, and opening the door to religious perspectives in that setting is a big mistake." In 2007, Collins founded the BioLogos Foundation to "contribute to the public voice that represents the harmony of science and faith." He served as the foundation's president until he was confirmed as director of the NIH. Collins has also spoken at the Veritas Forum on the relationship between science and religion and the existence of God.

Christopher Hitchens referred to Collins as "one of the greatest living Americans", and stated that Collins was one of the most devout believers he had ever met. He further stated that Collins was sequencing the genome of the cancer that would ultimately claim Hitchens's life, and that their friendship despite their differing opinion on religion was an example of the greatest armed truce in modern times.

=== Agnosticism ===
In an interview with National Geographic in February 2007, writer John Horgan criticized Collins's description of agnosticism as "a cop-out". In response, Collins clarified his position on agnosticism so as to exclude "earnest agnostics who have considered the evidence and still don't find an answer. I was reacting to the agnosticism I see in the scientific community, which has not been arrived at by a careful examination of the evidence. I went through a phase when I was a casual agnostic, and I am perhaps too quick to assume that others have no more depth than I did."

=== Abortion ===
In a 1998 interview with Scientific American, Collins stated that he is "intensely uncomfortable with abortion as a solution to anything" and does not "perceive a precise moment at which life begins other than the moment of conception." In the same interview, it was said that Collins also "does not advocate changing the law".

== Books ==
- Principles of Medical Genetics, 2nd Edition, with T. D. Gelehrter and D. Ginsburg (Lippincott Williams & Wilkins, 1998)
- The Language of God: A Scientist Presents Evidence for Belief (Free Press, 2006)
- The Language of Life: DNA and the Revolution in Personalized Medicine (HarperCollins, published in early 2010)
- Belief: Readings on the Reason for Faith (HarperOne, March 2, 2010)
- The Language of Science and Faith: Straight Answers to Genuine Questions with Karl Giberson (InterVarsity Press; February 15, 2011)
- The Road to Wisdom: On Truth, Science, Faith, and Trust (Hachette Book Group, September 17, 2024)

== See also ==
- List of events in National Human Genome Research Institute history
- Science and religion

Government offices
Preceded by James D. Watson	Director of the National Human Genome Research Institute; 1993–2008	Succeeded by Eric D. Green
Preceded by Raynard Kington; Acting	Director of the National Institutes of Health; 2009–2021	Succeeded by Lawrence A. Tabak; Acting
Political offices
Preceded by Eric Lander	Science Advisor to the President; Acting; 2022	Succeeded by Arati Prabhakar
