= NIH Intramural Research Program =

Internal research program of the National Institutes of Health

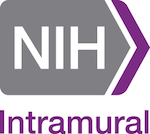

Agency overview
- Formed: 1930
- Preceding agency: Hygienic Laboratory
- Headquarters: Bethesda, Maryland
- Agency executive: Nina F. Schor, Deputy Director for Intramural Research
- Parent agency: Department of Health & Human Services
- Website: irp.nih.gov

The NIH Intramural Research Program (IRP) is the internal research program of the National Institutes of Health (NIH), known for its synergistic approach to biomedical science. With 1,200 Principal Investigators and over 4,000 Postdoctoral Fellows conducting basic, translational, and clinical research, the NIH Intramural Research Program is the largest biomedical research institution on earth. The unique funding environment of the IRP facilitates opportunities to conduct both long-term and high-impact science that would otherwise be difficult to undertake. With rigorous external reviews ensuring that only the most outstanding research secures funding, the IRP is responsible for many scientific accomplishments, including the discovery of fluoride to prevent tooth decay, the use of lithium to manage bipolar disorder, and the creation of vaccines against hepatitis, Hemophilus influenzae (Hib), and human papillomavirus (HPV). In addition, the IRP has also produced or trained 21 Nobel Prize-winning scientists.

== Mission ==
Within the framework of the NIH mandate, the Intramural Research Program's mission is to:

- Conduct distinctive, laboratory, clinical, behavioral, translational and population-based research that breaks new ground and defines scientific excellence
- Facilitate new approaches to improve health through prevention, early detection, diagnosis, and treatment by developing and/or using innovative technologies, approaches or devices
- Respond rapidly to critical public health needs
- Train the next generation of biomedical and behavioral researchers
- Foster sharing of information and dissemination of the IRP's major discoveries to the public through partnerships with academic institutions and industry

== History ==
The NIH Intramural Research Program (IRP) traces its roots to 1887, when a one-room laboratory on Staten Island was created within the Marine Hospital Service, a predecessor agency to the U.S. Public Health Service. This laboratory evolved into the Hygienic Laboratory, which moved to Washington, D.C., in 1891 and, with the Ransdell Act of 1930, became the National Institute of Health. Several of the IRP's initial Institutes were established over the next two decades and, after World War II, Vannevar Bush, director of the Office of Scientific Research and Development, outlined a program for postwar scientific research that affirmed the contributions of "remote and unexpected fields of medicine and the underlying sciences" in the progress against disease and the benefits of cooperative endeavors with industry and academia.

The disease orientation and categorical structure of the IRP had its genesis in the establishment of the National Cancer Institute (NCI) in 1944. In 1948, Congress passed the National Heart Act, which created the National Heart Institute, and soon after established institutes for research on mental health, oral diseases, neurological problems, and blindness. Today, the IRP consists of individual programs housed in 23 of the NIH Institutes and Centers, creating a network of multi-disciplinary, federally funded laboratories with an emphasis on translational research. The National Institutes of Health Clinical Center, the world's largest clinical research hospital, is designed to foster smooth transitions between laboratory work, patient studies, and bedside cures, facilitating the translation of laboratory findings to new approaches for the prevention and cure of human diseases.

== Organization and leadership ==
The National Institutes of Health (NIH) is composed of 27 Institutes and Centers, most of which include research programs led by a Scientific Director and conducted by federal researchers and their trainees at one of several NIH campus locations. Collectively, these research programs encompass the Intramural Research Program (IRP). The IRP includes the United States National Library of Medicine, an international resource for researchers, and the NIH Clinical Center, the world's largest clinical research hospital.

Intramural researchers are affiliated with individual Laboratories, Branches or Centers, which are typically organized around common thematic research goals and approaches, much like a department or center at an academic institution. Within these larger structures, Principal Investigators run Sections or Units devoted to their independent research goals. Core facilities, supported by staff scientists and clinicians, are among the shared resources available to IRP researchers.

Scientific interests are not bound by the organizational structure. There exists a full spectrum of scientific interest groups (called SIGs) that brings researchers from different Institutes and Centers together around common areas of scientific interest where ideas can be shared and collaborations initiated. In addition, institutes come together to work cooperatively on major initiatives focused on unraveling the complexities of disease. The Center for Human Immunology, Autoimmunity and Inflammation (CHI) is one example of this trans-NIH cooperative research approach.

As with all biomedical research, the scientific programs of the IRP's 1,200 Principal Investigators are subject to periodic scientific review. Each Principal Investigator must be peer-reviewed at least once every four years by an external Board of Scientific Counselors (BSC). The BSC evaluates the quality of research, the resources that should be allocated to scientists, and the promise of tenure-track investigators for future success in their careers. These evaluations are based on the Principal Investigator's past accomplishments, objectives met, and future plans. The review criteria mirror those used by extramural peer review with the addition of considering whether the investigator is taking advantage of the special features of the NIH intramural scientific environment and employing useful collaborative arrangements. As a result of these reviews, recommendations for altering allocated resources are prepared by the BSC for the Scientific Director, the Institute or Center Director, the NIH Deputy Director for Intramural Research, and the Institute or Center (IC) National Advisory Council or Board.

Additionally, each IRP as a whole is subject to periodic review by Blue Ribbon Panels. These panels, made up of expert external reviewers appointed by the NIH Director, ensure that the program's overall objectives are current, relevant, distinctive, and appropriate to the unique research environment of the IRP. Blue Ribbon Panel reports are addressed to the NIH Director, the Advisory Committee of the Director, and the IC Director.

In addition to the external NIH Boards of Scientific Counselors and Blue Ribbon Panels, the NIH IRP receives regular and periodic independent evaluations by the following external bodies:

- U.S. Congress and its committees; U.S. Government Accountability Office
- National Academies of Sciences, Institute of Medicine
- Office of the Inspector General
- Office of Management and Budget (e.g., Program Assessment Rating Tool)
- Association for Assessment and Accreditation of Laboratory Animal Care International
- The Joint Commission
- Accreditation Council for Graduate Medical Education
- Accreditation Council for Continuing Medical Education
- Nuclear Regulatory Commission
- Occupational Safety & Health Administration
- Association for Accreditation of Human Research Protection Programs

Nina F. Schor, M.D. is the Deputy Director for Intramural Research and heads the Office of Intramural Research (OIR). In this role, he is responsible for oversight and coordination of all intramural research, training and technology transfer activities.

== IRP Programs ==
Name	Acronym	Description	Est.
National Cancer Institute	NCI	The Center for Cancer Research (CCR) conducts basic and clinical cancer research and develops novel therapeutic interventions for cancer and HIV patients; the Division of Cancer Epidemiology and Genetics (DCEG) conducts population and multidisciplinary research to discover the genetic and environmental determinants of cancer and new approaches to cancer prevention.	1937
National Institute of Allergy and Infectious Diseases	NIAID	Conducts basic and clinical research related to immunology, allergy, and infectious diseases to promote the development of new vaccines, therapeutics, and diagnostics; the Vaccine Research Center (VRC) conducts research that facilitates the development of effective vaccines for human disease, with a focus on AIDS.	1948
National Institute of Dental and Craniofacial Research	NIDCR	NIDCR conducts basic laboratory, translational, and clinical research in support of craniofacial and dental health using the latest techniques in biomedical science.	1948
National Institute of Diabetes and Digestive and Kidney Diseases	NIDDK	NIDDK conducts research related to metabolic, digestive, kidney, and hematologic diseases and diabetes mellitus.	1948
National Heart, Lung, and Blood Institute	NHLBI	NHLBI performs scientific and clinical research to better understand the biology and clinical pathology of heart, lung, and blood diseases.	1948
National Institute of Mental Health	NIMH	NIMH researches the mechanisms of normal brain function at the behavioral, systems, and molecular levels, and conducts clinical investigations of mental illness.	1949
National Institute of Neurological Disorders and Stroke	NINDS	NINDS conducts basic, translational, and clinical research aimed at relieving the burden of neurological disorders and stroke.	1950
National Library of Medicine	NLM	The National Center for Biotechnology Information (NCBI) creates and maintains databases for the medical and scientific communities and general public, including literature, molecular, and genomic databases. The Lister Hill National Center for Biomedical Communications (LHNCBC) conducts and supports research and development with the goal of improving access to high quality biomedical information for individuals around the world.	1956
Eunice Kennedy Shriver National Institute of Child Health and Human Development	NICHD	NICHD focuses its research on the biology of human development and reproduction to ensure the birth of healthy babies and the health of infants and children into adulthood.	1962
National Eye Institute	NEI	NEI carries out basic and clinical research to develop therapeutic interventions for the prevention and treatment of visual system diseases.	1968
National Institute of Environmental Health Sciences	NIEHS	NIEHS aims to reduce the burden of human illness by understanding how the environment influences the development and progression of disease.	1969
National Institute on Alcohol Abuse and Alcoholism	NIAAA	NIAAA aims to identify the causes and consequences of alcoholism and excessive drinking, and to understand the underlying biological processes of disease.	1970
National Institute on Drug Abuse	NIDA	NIDA conducts state-of-the-art research on basic mechanisms that underlie drug abuse and addiction, and develops new methods of treatment.	1973
National Institute on Aging	NIA	NIA provides an academic setting for a comprehensive effort to understand aging through multidisciplinary investigator-initiated research.	1974
National Institute of Arthritis and Musculoskeletal and Skin Diseases	NIAMS	NIAMS focuses on studying diseases that involve bones, joints, muscles, and skin through clinical and laboratory research.	1986
National Institute of Nursing Research	NINR	NINR seeks to understand the underlying biological mechanisms of a range of symptoms, their effect on patients, and how patients respond to interventions.	1986
National Institute on Deafness and Other Communication Disorders	NIDCD	NIDCD conducts basic and clinical research in the areas of human communication.	1988
National Human Genome Research Institute	NHGRI	NHGRI conducts laboratory, clinical, and behavioral research focused on human genetic disease and develops methods for the detection, prevention, and treatment of genetic disorders.	1989
National Institute of Biomedical Imaging and Bioengineering	NIBIB	NIBIB integrates engineering and physical sciences with the life sciences to advance basic research and medical care with biomedical technologies.	2000
National Institute on Minority Health and Health Disparities	NIMHD	NIMHD conducts research on differences in the incidence, prevalence, mortality, and burden of diseases and other adverse health conditions that exist among specific population groups.	2010
National Institutes of Health Clinical Center	CC	The Clinical Center is the nation's largest hospital devoted entirely to leading-edge clinical biomedical research.	1953
National Center for Complementary and Alternative Medicine	NCCAM	NCCAM investigates the potential clinical utility of selected complementary and alternative medicine modalities that might allay or attenuate life "stressors".	1998
Center for Information Technology	CIT	CIT develops leading-edge computational methods and tools to solve complex biomedical laboratory and clinical research problems.	1964 (as the Division of Computer Research and Technology (DCRT))
National Center for Advancing Translational Sciences	NCATS	The NCATS Division of Preclinical Innovation (DPI) leads scientific programs and projects designed to advance new technologies that make the preclinical phase and early clinical phases of translation more predictive and efficient.	2012

== NIH Clinical Center ==
The National Institutes of Health Clinical Center, the world's largest hospital entirely devoted to clinical research, is a national resource that enables the rapid translation of scientific observations and laboratory discoveries into new approaches for diagnosing, treating and preventing disease. Due to its position on the main campus in Bethesda, Maryland, the Institutes and Centers of the IRP are able to mobilize clinical resources quickly and effectively to respond to emerging scientific challenges and opportunities.

The NIH Clinical Center is the 2011 recipient of the Lasker-Bloomberg Public Service Award, given by the Albert and Mary Lasker Foundation. This award honors the Clinical Center for serving as a model institution that has, since 1953, transformed scientific advances into innovative therapies and provided high-quality care to patients and recognizes the Clinical Center's rich history of medical discovery through clinical research.

At the NIH Clinical Center, clinical research participants—more than 480,000 since the hospital opened in 1953—are active partners in medical discovery. This partnership has resulted in a long list of medical milestones, including the development of chemotherapy; the first use of an immunotoxin to treat a malignancy; identification of the genes that cause kidney cancer, leading to the development of six new, targeted treatments for advanced kidney cancer; the discovery that lithium helps depression; the first gene therapy; the first AIDS treatment; and the development of tests to detect AIDS/HIV and hepatitis viruses in blood, which led to a safer blood supply. The NIH Clinical Center sees 10,000 new research participants a year from around the world.

== NIH deputy intramural directors ==
- G. Burroughs Mider, July 1, 1960-May 19, 1968
- Joseph Edward Rall, June 1983-May 1991
- Lance Liotta, July 6, 1992-August 1993
- Michael M. Gottesman, November 1993-July 31, 2022
- Nina F. Schor, 2022-present
