= Eric D. Green =

American science administrator (born 1959)

Eric Green
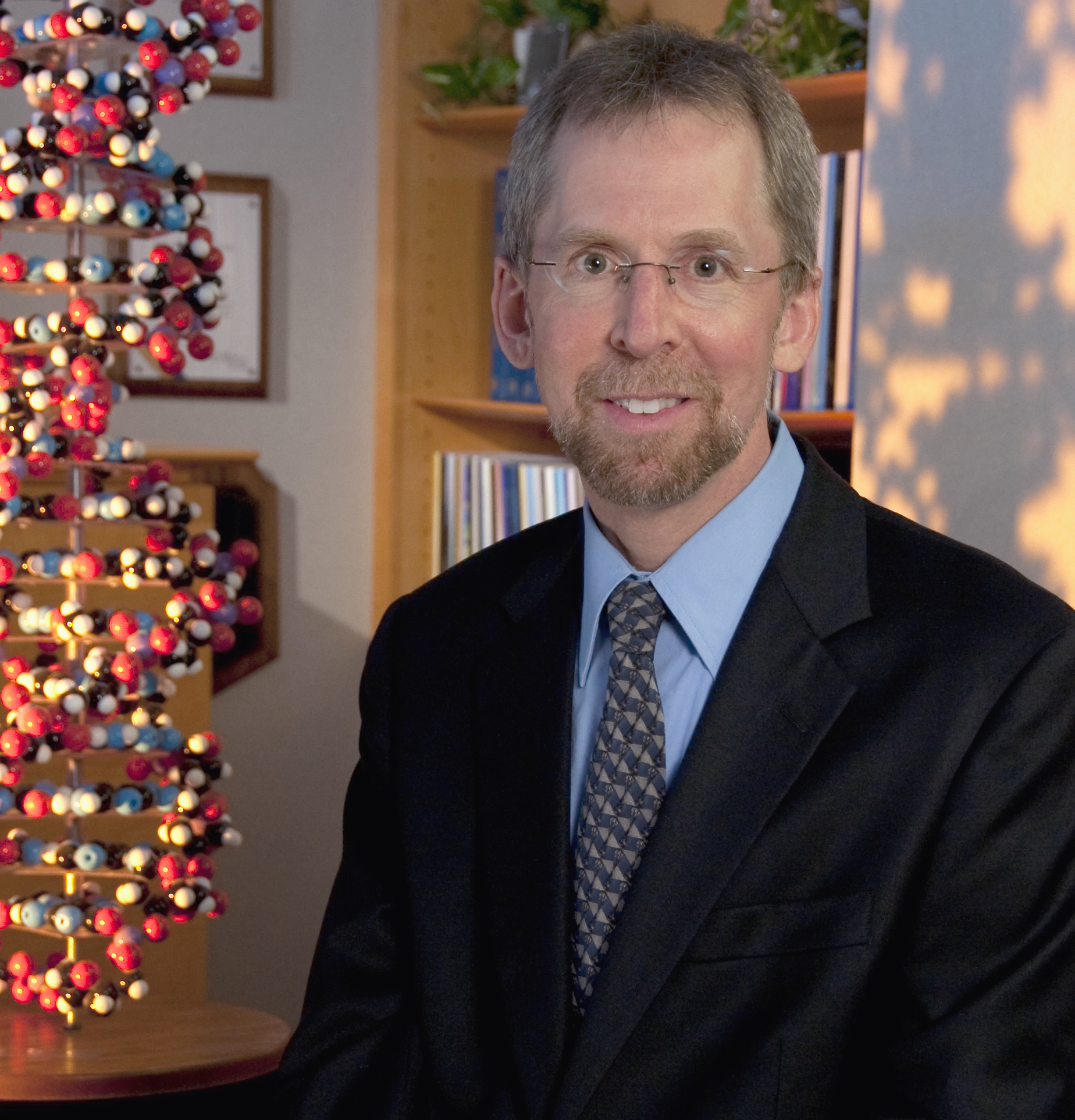

3rd Director of the National Human Genome Research Institute
- In office December 1, 2009 – March 17, 2025
- President: Barack Obama; Donald Trump; Joe Biden
- Preceded by: Alan E. Guttmacher (Acting)
- Succeeded by: Vence L. Bonham Jr. (Acting)

Personal details
- Born: Eric Douglas Green; December 10, 1959 (age 66) St. Louis, Missouri, U.S.
- Spouse: Gabriela Adelt
- Education: University of Wisconsin, Madison (BS); Washington University (MD, PhD)
- Scientific career
- Fields: Genomics
- Workplaces: Washington University in St. Louis; National Human Genome Research Institute
- Thesis: Structures and Biosynthesis of Asn-Linked Oligosaccharides on the Pituitary Glycoprotein Hormones (1987)
- Doctoral advisor: Jacques Baenziger; Irving Boime
- Other academic advisors: Maynard Olson

Eric D. Green (born December 10, 1959) is an American genomics researcher who had significant involvement in the Human Genome Project. He was the director of the National Human Genome Research Institute (NHGRI) at the National Institutes of Health (NIH) between December 2009 and March 2025.

== Early life and education ==
Born and raised in St. Louis, Missouri, Green comes from a scientific family. His father, Maurice Green, was a virologist at St. Louis University School of Medicine, where he directed the Institute for Molecular Virology for over five decades. His brother, Michael Green, was a molecular biologist at UMass Chan Medical School, where he chaired the Department of Molecular, Cell, and Cancer Biology and was an Investigator of the Howard Hughes Medical Institute until he died in 2023.

Green received his B.S. degree in bacteriology from the University of Wisconsin–Madison in 1981 and his M.D. and Ph.D. degrees from Washington University in St. Louis in 1987. During residency training in clinical pathology (laboratory medicine), he worked in the laboratory of Maynard Olson, where he launched his career in genomics research.

== Career ==
In 1992, Green was appointed Assistant Professor of Pathology and Genetics as well as a co-investigator in the Human Genome Center at Washington University. In 1994, he joined the newly established Intramural Research Program of the National Center for Human Genome Research, later renamed the National Human Genome Research Institute.

Green has served as chief of the NHGRI Genome Technology Branch (1996–2009), director of the NIH Intramural Sequencing Center (1997–2009), and NHGRI Scientific Director (2002–2009). He was appointed by Francis Collins to be NHGRI Director in 2009.

== Genomics research ==
While directing an independent research program for almost two decades, Green worked to map, sequence and understand eukaryotic genomes. His work included significant involvement in the Human Genome Project. These efforts eventually blossomed into a program in comparative genomics that provided insights about genome structure, function and evolution. His laboratory also identified and characterized several human disease genes, including those implicated in certain forms of hereditary deafness, vascular disease and inherited peripheral neuropathy.

== NHGRI director ==
As NHGRI director, Green leads the Institute's research programs and other initiatives, and it has completed two major cycles of strategic planning. The first effort yielded the 2011 NHGRI strategic plan, "Charting a course for genomic medicine from base pairs to bedside" the second will yield a new strategic plan in October 2020. These two strategic planning processes have guided an expansion of NHGRI's research portfolio, including the design and launch of programs to accelerate the application of genomics to medical care, to catalyze the growth of genomic data science, to continue efforts to unravel the functional complexities of the human genome, and to enhance the building of the genomics workforce of the future.

Green has played a role in developing many high-profile genomics efforts, such as the Undiagnosed Diseases Network, Human Heredity and Health in Africa (H3Africa), and the Human Microbiome Project. He has also been involved in the Smithsonian-NHGRI exhibition Genome: Unlocking Life's Code, several trans-NIH data science initiatives, the NIH Genomic Data Sharing Policy, the U.S. Precision Medicine Initiative and NIH All of Us Research Program.

== Honors ==
Honors given to Green include a Helen Hay Whitney Postdoctoral Research Fellowship (1989–1990), a Lucille P. Markey Scholar Award in Biomedical Science (1990–1994), induction into the American Society for Clinical Investigation (2002), an Alumni Achievement Award from Washington University School of Medicine (2005), induction into the Association of American Physicians (2007), a Distinguished Alumni Award from Washington University (2010), the Cotlove Lectureship Award from the Academy of Clinical Laboratory Physicians and Scientists (2011), a Ladue Horton Watkins High School Distinguished Alumni Award (2012), and the Wallace H. Coulter Lectureship Award from the American Association for Clinical Chemistry (2012).

Green is a founding editor of the journal Genome Research (1995–present) and a series editor for Genome Analysis: A Laboratory Manual (1994–1998), both published by Cold Spring Harbor Laboratory Press. He was a co-editor of the Annual Review of Genomics and Human Genetics from 2005-2026. Green has authored and co-authored over 340 scientific publications.

Government offices
Preceded by Francis Collins	3rd Director of the National Human Genome Research Institute; 2009 – present	Incumbent
