= Judy Cho =

American gastroenterologist and geneticist

- Cho in 2022
- Education: Ohio State University
- Scientific career
- Fields: Gastroenterology, translational genetics
- Workplaces: University of Chicago; Yale University; Icahn School of Medicine at Mount Sinai; National Institutes of Health

Judy Cho is an American gastroenterologist and geneticist serving as director of the National Human Genome Research Institute since 2026.

== Life ==
Cho received an M.D. from the Ohio State University College of Medicine. She is a board-certified physician specializing in gastroenterology.

In 2001, Cho was a gastroenterologist at the University of Chicago researching a genetically inherited form of Crohn's disease. By 2007, she was director of the inflammatory bowel disease (IBD) center at Yale University. She served as dean and professor of translational genetics at Icahn School of Medicine at Mount Sinai.

Cho's research on genetic contributors to IBD have supported treatments for Crohn's disease and ulcerative colitis. She previously oversaw the BioMe BioBank Program at Mount Sinai, a database of patient blood samples and medical records that has enabled breakthroughs in personalized medicine. Cho has served on the National Advisory Council for Human Genome Research, which provides advice on genetics, genomics research, training and programs to National Human Genome Research Institute (NHGRI) and the National Institutes of Health (NIH). She served on NIH’s National Institute of Diabetes and Digestive and Kidney Diseases Board of Scientific Counselors.

In 2020, Cho was elected a member of the National Academy of Medicine. In 2021, she was awarded the Sherman Prize for excellence in IBD research.

On August 23, 2026, Cho became director of the National Human Genome Research Institute.
