= Chromosome jumping =

Chromosome jumping is a tool of molecular biology that is used in the physical mapping of genomes. It is related to several other tools used for the same purpose, including chromosome walking.

Chromosome jumping is used to bypass regions difficult to clone, such as those containing repetitive DNA, that cannot be easily mapped by chromosome walking, and is useful in moving along a chromosome rapidly in search of a particular gene. Unlike chromosome walking, chromosome jumping is able to start on one point of the chromosome in order to traverse potential distant point of the same chromosome without cloning the intervening sequences. The ends of a large DNA fragment is the target cloning section of the chromosome jumping while the middle section gets removed by sequences of chemical manipulations prior to the cloning step.

== Process ==
Chromosome jumping enables two ends of a DNA sequence to be cloned without the middle section. Genomic DNA may be partially digested using restriction endonuclease and with the aid of DNA ligase, the fragments are circularized at low concentration. From a known sequence, a primer is designed to sequence across the circularized junction. This primer is used to jump 100 kb-300 kb intervals: a sequence 100 kb away would have come near the known sequence on circularization, it permits jumping and sequencing in an alternative manner. Thus, sequences not reachable by chromosome walking can be sequenced. Chromosome walking can also be used from the new jump position (in either direction) to look for gene-like sequences, or additional jumps can be used to progress further along the chromosome. Combining chromosome jumping to chromosome walking through the chromosome allows bypassing repetitive DNA for the search of the target gene.

=== Library ===
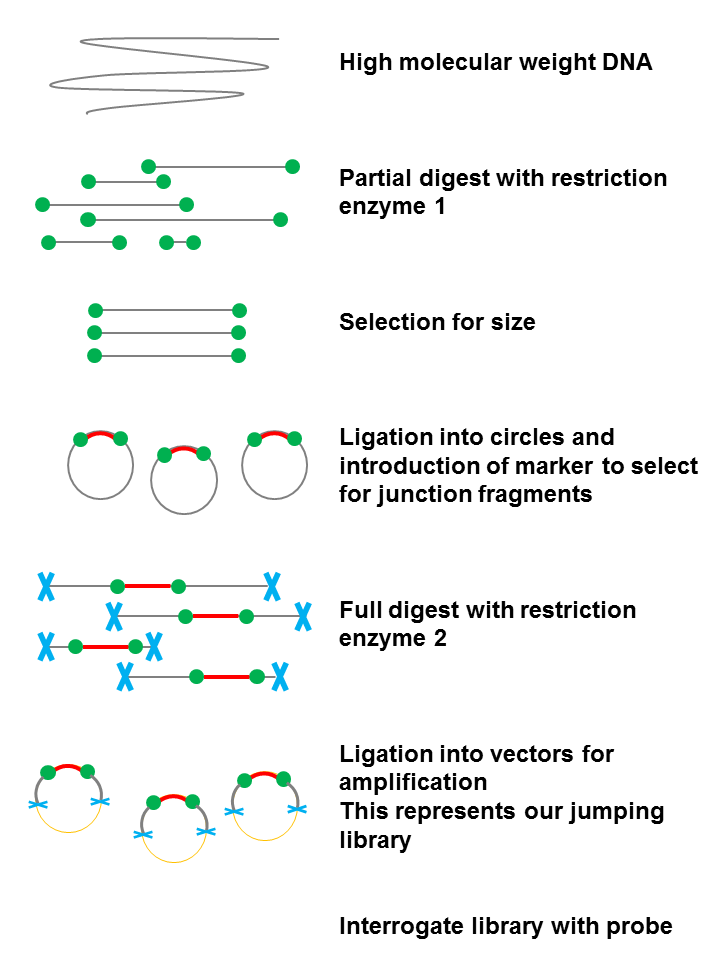
Method for creating a chromosome jumping library.

Chromosome jumping library is different from chromosome walking due to the manipulations executed before the cloning step. In order to construct the library of chromosome jumping, individual clones originate from random points in the genome (general jumping libraries first basic protocol) or from the termini of specific restriction fragments (specific jumping libraries alternate protocol) should be identified.

==== NotI-digested DNA ====
One example to build a library is a classified as a rare-cutting restriction endonuclease such as NotI. In order to construct and characterize a library based from NotI-digested human DNA, random clones were analyzed by restriction mapping. Due to the wide distribution of fragment sizes made by the complete digestion with NotI, the library was constructed into two fractions, low and high plasmid concentration. Clones that possessed unique end fragments were then analyzed by hybridization to Pulse Field Gradient (PFG) Southern blots. Examining the results gathered for single and double digests of human DNA with enzymes NotI, BssHII, and NruI, a restriction map with 850 kb was region containing the linking and jumping clones were created. Furthermore, NotI fragments of 250 and 350 kb jumps were evident in the two end clones derived corresponding to genetic distances of 0.25 and 0.35 cM.

== Advantages and disadvantages ==
The advantages of chromosome jumping are:

- Allows more rapid movement through the genome compared to other techniques, such as chromosome walking.
- Able to travel across chromosomal regions containing unclonable sequences in bacterial hosts.
- Thirdly, this technique can be used to generate genomic markers with known chromosomal locations.
- Combination of jumping and linking jumping libraries to walking offers possibility of directional walking and might allow the analysis of longer regions in parallel mapping strategies.
- Reduces the complexity of libraries to be screened and constructed of mammalian genome.

However, despite these advantages, chromosome jumping is still restricted by the capacity of the cloning vector which is the distance of the ends of the two fragments which can be approximately hundreds of kilobases. Additionally, because the jump does not clone the intervening DNA, chromosome walking would have to be done to identify all the genes present in the DNA. Regardless, it is still deemed to be beneficial due to the possibility to jump over hundred kilobases in comparison to chromosome walking.

=== Applications ===
==== Genetic disorders ====
Chromosome jumping libraries help address the complication of standard cloning techniques with large molecular distances. This process allowed the possibility to use the chromosome jumping library for other genetic disorders that requires 100 kilobases jumps. Particularly for genetic disorders such as cystic fibrosis, its gene is located in human chromosome 7, was able to utilize the chromosome jumping library to search for a jumping clone, met oncogene. Identification of the cystic fibrosis was complicated due to it existing in eukaryotic genes that is composed with coding (exons) and non-coding (introns) segments, where introns are small in size making them difficult for detection. Another struggle in recognizing cystic fibrosis gene is because mammalian cells contains variety of repetitive DNA that can lead to incorrect cloning and blockage of DNA Replication and can cause instability. Both these complications, traditional cloning techniques are unable to process because large yield of exons would have to be visible to produce a signal for the cystic fibrosis gene to be identified and DNA would have to be free of any repetitive elements.

=== See also ===
- Shotgun sequencing
- Chromosome walking
- Chromosome landing
- Jumping library
