= Nina F. Schor =

American pediatric neurologist

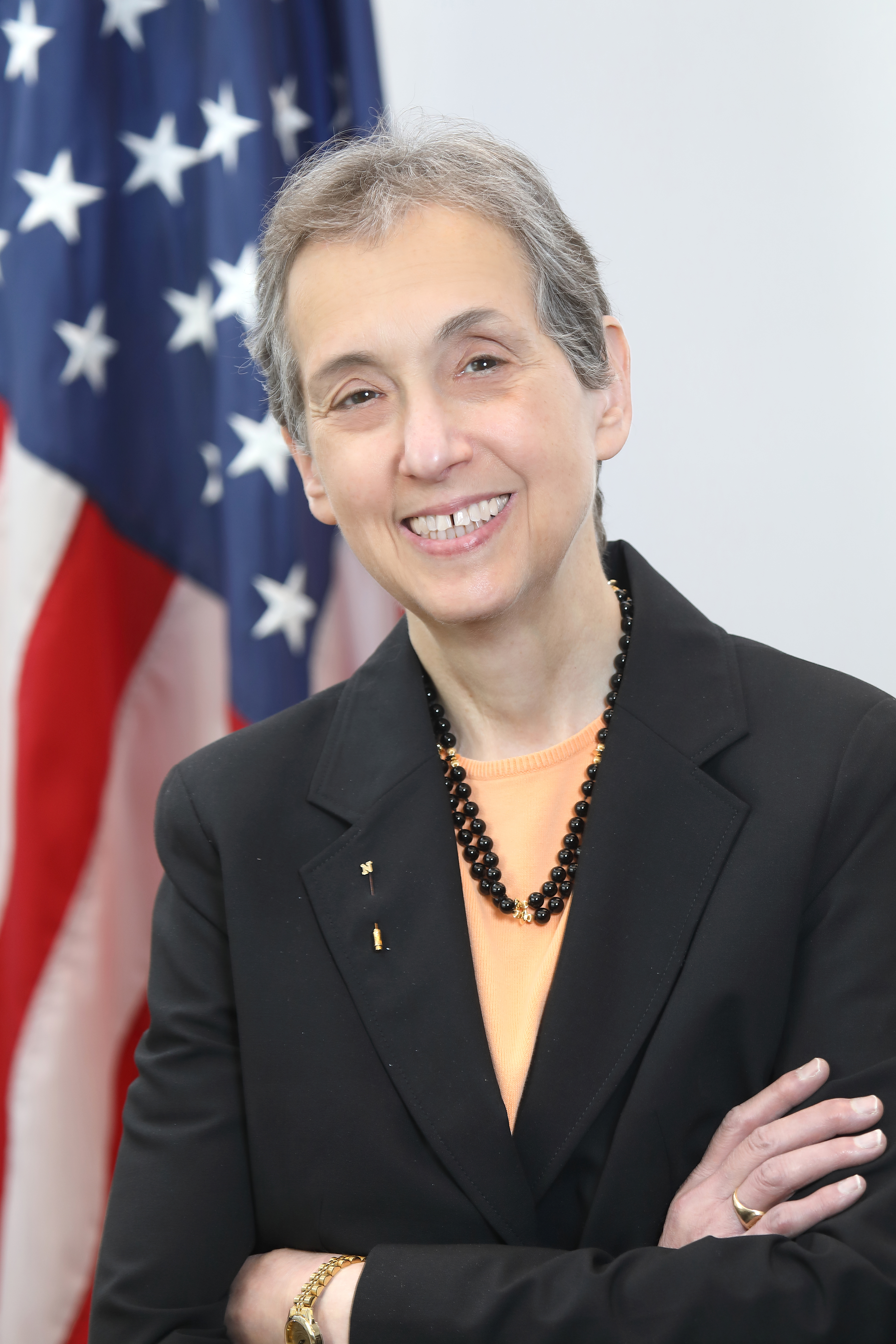
- Schor in 2023
- Born: Nina Felice Tabachnik
- Education: Yale University (BS); Rockefeller University (PhD); Cornell University (MD)
- Awards: Member, National Academy of Medicine (2024)
- Scientific career
- Fields: Pediatric neurology
- Workplaces: University of Pittsburgh; University of Rochester; National Institutes of Health
- Doctoral advisor: Anthony Cerami

Nina Felice Schor (née Tabachnik) is an American physician-scientist and pediatric neurologist. She served as director of the NIH Intramural Research Program from August of 2022 through September of 2025. Schor was the deputy director of National Institute of Neurological Disorders and Stroke from 2018 to 2022. She was the William H. Eilinger Chair of the Department of Pediatrics at University of Rochester and Pediatrician-in-Chief of the Golisano Children’s Hospital from 2006 to January 2018. She was elected a member of the National Academy of Medicine in 2024.

== Early life and education ==
Schor was born in Bayside, Queens to William D. Tabachnik, Ph.D. and Rhoda Lee (Smul) Tabachnik. Her father was the manager of database administration at the Mobil Corporation. Her mother was a buyer in the NYC Garment Center and a performer in regional musical theater. In 1972, Schor became the first female to win first prize of the Westinghouse Science Talent Search. She graduated cum laude from Yale University with a B.S. degree in Molecular Biophysics and Biochemistry and as a Scholar of the House in Chemistry Research in 1975.

Schor received her Ph.D. in Medical Biochemistry from Rockefeller University and the laboratory of Anthony Cerami in 1980 and her M.D. from Cornell University Medical College in 1981. Schor pursued residency training in pediatrics at Boston Children’s Hospital (1981-1983) under Mary Ellen Avery and child neurology at the Longwood Area-Harvard Neurology Program (1983-1986) under Charles Barlow. During residency, she also pursued a postdoctoral fellowship in the laboratory of Manfred Karnofsky at Harvard. During this time, she began her studies of neuroblastoma, aimed at understanding the neurobiology of this tumor and exploiting this understanding to design and test in preclinical models novel strategies for the therapy of chemoresistant neuroblastoma.

== Career ==
For the next 20 years, Schor rose through the academic and administrative ranks at the University of Pittsburgh, ultimately becoming the Carol Ann Craumer Professor of Pediatric Research, Chief of the Division of Child Neurology in the Department of Pediatrics, and Associate Dean for Medical Student Research at the medical school. She designed and implemented one of the first computer-gated, problem-based curricular elements at the University of Pittsburgh School of Medicine. Schor designed and implemented the Scholarly Project Initiative, requiring research and scholarship from every medical student at University of Pittsburgh School of Medicine.

Schor was primarily responsible for the development of the Golisano Children’s Hospital and the Levine Autism Center at the University of Rochester Medical Center. In 2006, Schor became the William H. Eilinger Chair of the Department of Pediatrics, and Pediatrician-in-Chief of the Golisano Children’s Hospital at the University of Rochester, posts she held until January 2018, when she became Deputy Director of the National Institute of Neurological Disorders and Stroke (NINDS). In 2016, she became a fellow of the American Academy of Neurology.

In May 2021, she also assumed the role of Acting Scientific Director of NINDS. She was continuously NIH-funded for research and training efforts for 27 years. She was appointed by Lawrence A. Tabak as acting director of the NIH Intramural Research Program (IRP), succeeding Michael M. Gottesman. Schor began her new role on August 1, 2022. She became the IRP director on November 6, 2022.

== Personal life ==
In 1984, Tabachnik married Robert Hyllel Schor, an associate professor of neurophysiology at the Rockefeller University.

== Selected works ==
- Schor, Nina Felice (2002). The Neurology of Neuroblastoma: Neuroblastoma As a Neurobiological Disease. Kluwer Academic Publishers. ISBN 978-1-4020-7144-7.
