= Tara Matise =

American geneticist

Tara Cox Matise
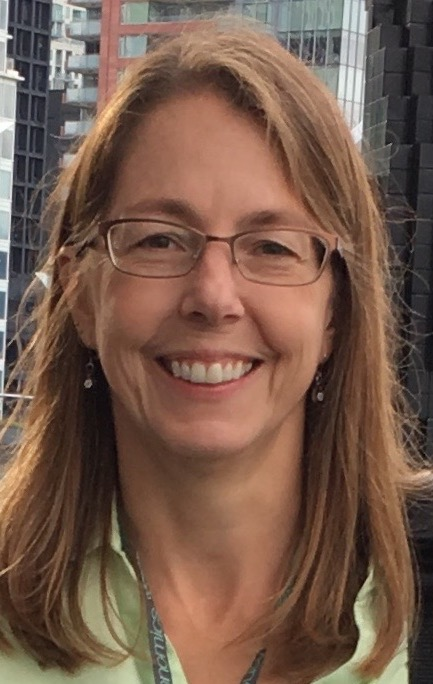
- Matise in October 2016
- Born: Tara Kathleen Cox
- Education: Cornell University; University of Pittsburgh
- Scientific career
- Workplaces: Rutgers University; Rockefeller University; Columbia University; University of Pittsburgh
- Thesis: Automated genetic linkage mapping : development and performance assessment of an expert system computer program (1992)

Tara Matise is an American geneticist at Rutgers University. Since 2018, she has served as chair of the Department of Genetics. Her research interests span computational genetics, data science, and human genetics. She is co-director of the Rutgers University Genetics Coordinating Center.

== Early life and education ==
A native of Buffalo, New York, Matise attended high school at The Buffalo Seminary, a private secular school for girls, graduating in 1982, after which she attended Cornell University, where she earned a bachelor’s degree in biology with a concentration in genetics. She went on to earn a master’s degree in Genetic Counseling in 1988 from the University of Pittsburgh, and a doctorate in 1992 in human genetics from the University of Pittsburgh School of Public Health under the direction of Aravinda Chakravarti. Matise then worked as a postdoctoral fellow at the University of Pittsburgh, Columbia University and Rockefeller University. At Rockefeller, Matise worked under the supervision of Jürg Ott.

== Research and career ==
Matise moved to Rutgers University in 2000. She was appointed Head of the Computational Genetics Program in the Human Genetics Institute of New Jersey in 2014. In 2021, Matise was elected as a fellow in the American Association for the Advancement of Science. Matise began her career using genetic linkage to identify genes for genetic diseases. Her contribution to the identification of the cystic fibrosis transmembrane conductance regulator (CFTR) gene was honored by the Cystic Fibrosis Foundation in 1990. Matise was the creator of MultiMap, a computer program that automated the construction of genetic linkage maps of the human genome. Her work facilitated the development of several genome-wide gene maps in humans and other organisms, and led to the development of the Rutgers Maps, which contain over 28,000 markers and provide an interpolated position for all human markers, the largest linkage map of human polymorphic markers.

In 2008, Matise, as co-director of the Rutgers University Genetics Coordinating Center (RUGCC), was funded to lead a coordinating center for the multi-center Population Architecture using Genomics and Epidemiology (PAGE) study. Funded by the National Human Genome Research Institute (NHGRI) at the National Institutes of Health (NIH), the PAGE consortium was a pioneer in its approach to performing globally representative epidemiological genomics. The RUGCC was responsible for data quality control and dissemination, and study logistics.

Matise, as co-lead of the RUGCC, was funded to direct the coordinating center for the National Human Genome Research Institute (NHGRI) Genome Sequencing Program in 2015. The program made use of genome sequencing to understand the genes that underpin inherited disease.

== Selected publications ==
- Kerem B; Rommens JM; Buchanan JA; Markiewicz D; Cox TK; Chakravarti A; Buchwald M; Tsui LC (1989). "Identification of the cystic fibrosis gene: genetic analysis". Science. 245 (4922): 1073–80. doi:10.1126/science.2570460. PMID 2570460. Wikidata Q29614402.
- Matise TC; Perlin M; Chakravarti A (1994). "Automated construction of genetic linkage maps using an expert system (MultiMap): a human genome linkage map". Nature Genetics. 6 (4): 384–390. doi:10.1038/ng0494-384. PMID 8054979. Wikidata Q52379176.
- G D Schuler; M S Boguski; E A Stewart; et al. (1996). "A Gene Map of the Human Genome". Science. 274 (5287): 540-546, 540-6. doi:10.1126/science.274.5287.540. PMID 8849440. Wikidata Q22065571.
- Matise, Tara; Ravi Sachidanandam; Clark, Andrew Galen; et al. (2003). "A 3.9-centimorgan-resolution human single-nucleotide polymorphism linkage map and screening set". American Journal of Human Genetics. 73 (2): 271–284. doi:10.1086/377137. PMC 1180367. PMID 12844283. Wikidata Q33905163.
- Matise, Tara; Jose Luis Ambite; Steven Buyske; et al. (2011). "The Next PAGE in understanding complex traits: design for the analysis of Population Architecture Using Genetics and Epidemiology (PAGE) Study". American Journal of Epidemiology. 174 (7): 849–859. doi:10.1093/aje/kwr160. PMC 3176830. PMID 21836165. Wikidata Q35223497.
- Genevieve L Wojcik; Graff, Mariaelisa; Katherine K Nishimura; et al. (2019). "Genetic analyses of diverse populations improves discovery for complex traits". Nature. 570 (7762): 514–518. doi:10.1038/s41586-019-1310-4. PMID 31217584. Wikidata Q92886001.
