= Chromosome landing =

Chromosomal landing is a genetic technique used to identify and isolate clones in a genetic library. Chromosomal landing reduces the problem of analyzing large, and/or highly repetitive genomes by minimizing the need for chromosome walking. It is based on the principle that the expected average between-marker distances can be smaller than the average insert length of a clone library containing the gene of interest.

From the abstract of PMID 7716809:

The strategy of chromosome walking is based on the assumption that it is difficult and time consuming to find DNA markers that are physically close to a gene of interest. Recent technological developments invalidate this assumption for many species. As a result, the mapping paradigm has now changed such that one first isolates one or more DNA marker(s) at a physical distance from the targeted gene that is less than the average insert size of the genomic library being used for clone isolation. The DNA marker is then used to screen the library and isolate (or 'land' on) the clone containing the gene, without any need for chromosome walking and its associated problems. Chromosome landing, together with the technology that has made it possible, is likely to become the main strategy by which map-based cloning is applied to isolate both major genes and genes underlying quantitative traits in plant species.

== Applications ==
Chromosome landing has been used in plant positional cloning to reduce target intervals to a small number of large-insert BAC clones. For example, in rice, closely linked markers were used to screen a BAC library and narrow the Xa4 locus to six overlapping BAC clones spanning 420 kb. In Myrobalan plum, BAC-based chromosome landing reduced the Ma interval to a single 280 kb BAC clone carrying the gene.

== See also ==
- Primer walking
