= Primer walking =

DNA sequencing method

Primer walking is a technique used to clone a gene (e.g., disease gene) from its known closest markers (e.g., known gene). As a result, it is employed in cloning and sequencing efforts in plants, fungi, and mammals with minor alterations. This technique, also known as "directed sequencing," employs a series of Sanger sequencing reactions to either confirm the reference sequence of a known plasmid or PCR product based on the reference sequence (sequence confirmation service) or to discover the unknown sequence of a full plasmid or PCR product by designing primers to sequence overlapping sections (sequence discovery service).

== Primer walking: a DNA sequencing method ==
Primer walking is a method to determine the sequence of DNA up to the 1.3–7.0 kb range whereas chromosome walking is used to produce the clones of already known sequences of the gene. Too long fragments cannot be sequenced in a single sequence read using the chain termination method. This method works by dividing the long sequence into several consecutive short ones. The DNA of interest may be a plasmid insert, a PCR product or a fragment representing a gap when sequencing a genome. The term "primer walking" is used where the main aim is to sequence the genome. The term "chromosome walking" is used instead when the sequence is known but there is no clone of a gene. For example, the gene for a disease may be located near a specific marker such as an RFLP on the sequence. Chromosome walking is a technique used to clone a gene (e.g., disease gene) from its known closest markers (e.g., known gene) and hence is used in moderate modifications in cloning and sequencing projects in plants, fungi, and animals. To put it another way, it's utilized to find, isolate, and clone a specific sequence existing near the gene to be mapped. Libraries of large fragments, mainly bacterial artificial chromosome libraries, are mostly used in genomic projects. To identify the desired colony and to select a particular clone the library is screened first with a desired probe. After screening, the clone is overlapped with the probe and overlapping fragments are mapped. These fragments are then used as a new probe (short DNA fragments obtained from the 3′ or 5′ ends of clones) to identify other clones. A library approximately consists of 96 clones and each clone contains a different insert. Probe one identifies λ1 and λ2 as it overlaps them. Probe two derived from λ2 clones is used to identify λ3, and so on. Orientation of the clones is determined by restriction mapping of the clones. Thus, new chromosomal regions present in the vicinity of a gene could be identified. Chromosome walking is time-consuming, and chromosome landing is the method of choice for gene identification. This method necessitates the discovery of a marker that is firmly related to the mutant locus.

The fragment is first sequenced as if it were a shorter fragment. Sequencing is performed from each end using either universal primers or specifically designed ones. This should identify the first 1000 or so bases. In order to completely sequence the region of interest, design and synthesis of new primers (complementary to the final 20 bases of the known sequence) is necessary to obtain contiguous sequence information.

== Primer walking versus shotgun sequencing ==
Primer walking is an example of directed sequencing because the primer is designed from a known region of DNA to guide the sequencing in a specific direction. In contrast to directed sequencing, shotgun sequencing of DNA is a more rapid sequencing strategy.

There is a technique from the "old time" of genome sequencing. The underlying method for sequencing is the Sanger chain termination method which can have read lengths between 100 and 1000 basepairs (depending on the instruments used). This means you have to break down longer DNA molecules, clone and subsequently sequence them. There are two methods possible.

The first is called chromosome (or primer) walking and starts with sequencing the first piece. The next (contiguous) piece of the sequence is then sequenced using a primer which is complementary to the end of the first sequence read and so on. This technique doesn't require much assembling, but you need a lot of primers and it is relatively slow.

To overcome this problem the shotgun sequencing method was developed. Here the DNA is broken into different pieces (not all broken at the same place), cloned and sequenced with primers specific for the vector used for cloning. This leads to overlapping sequences which then have to be assembled into one sequence on the computer. This method allows for the parallelization of the sequencing (you can prepare a lot of sequencing reactions at the same time and run them) which makes the process much faster and also avoids the need for sequence specific primers. The challenge is to organize sequences into their order, as overlaps are not as clear here. To resolve this problem, a first draft is made and then critical regions are resequenced using other techniques such as primer walking.

== Process ==
The overall process is as follows: A primer that matches the beginning of the DNA to sequence is used to synthesize a short DNA strand adjacent to the unknown sequence, starting with the primer (see PCR). The new short DNA strand is sequenced using the chain termination method. The end of the sequenced strand is used as a primer for the next part of the long DNA sequence, hence the term "walking".

The method can be used to sequence entire chromosomes (hence "chromosome walking"). Primer walking was also the basis for the development of shotgun sequencing, which uses random primers instead of specifically chosen ones.

== See also ==
- Chromosome jumping
- Chromosome landing
- Shotgun sequencing – an alternative method, using random, rather than consecutive, sub-strands.

== Sources ==
- Bhatia, Saurabh; Sharma, Kiran; Dahiya, Randhir; Bera, Tanmoy (2015). Modern Applications of Plant Biotechnology in Pharmaceutical Sciences. doi:10.1016/c2014-0-02123-5. ISBN 978-0-12-802221-4.
- Cann, Alan J., ed. (1999). DNA Viruses: A Practical Approach. doi:10.1093/oso/9780199637195.001.0001. ISBN 978-0-19-963719-5. OCLC 1406788438.
