= National Human Genome Research Institute =

U.S. health institute

Coordinates: 39.00037°N 77.10335°W

National Human Genome Research Institute (NHGRI)

Agency overview
- Jurisdiction: Federal government of the United States
- Agency executive: Judy Cho, Director
- Parent department: United States Department of Health and Human Services
- Parent agency: National Institutes of Health
- Website: https://www.genome.gov/

The National Human Genome Research Institute (NHGRI) is an institute of the National Institutes of Health, located in Bethesda, Maryland.

NHGRI began as the Office of Human Genome Research in The Office of the Director in 1988. This Office transitioned to the National Center for Human Genome Research (NCHGR), in 1989 to carry out the role of the NIH in the International Human Genome Project (HGP). The HGP was developed in collaboration with the United States Department of Energy (DOE) and began in 1990 to sequence the human genome. In 1993, NCHGR expanded its role on the NIH campus by establishing the Division of Intramural Research (DIR) to apply genome technologies to the study of specific diseases. In 1996, the Center for Inherited Disease Research (CIDR) was also established (co-funded by eight NIH institutes and centers) to study the genetic components of complex disorders.

In 1997 the United States Department of Health and Human Services (DHHS) renamed NCHGR the National Human Genome Research Institute (NHGRI), officially elevating it to the status of research institute – one of 27 institutes and centers that make up the NIH.

The institute announced the successful sequencing of the human genome in April 2003, but there were still gaps remaining until the release of T2T-CHM13 by the Telomere-to-Telomere Consortium in 2022.

== Organizational structure ==
NHGRI is organized into seven divisions and the Office of the Director. Four of these divisions support extramural research (the grant-giving side), one coordinates the intramural (on-campus) research arm of the institute, one deals with administration, management, and budget, and one serves as the public-facing side of the institute housing the communications, policy, and education teams.

== History ==
- October 1, 1988 – The Office for Human Genome Research is created within the Office of the Director, National Institutes of Health (NIH). Also, NIH and the Department of Energy (DOE) sign a memorandum of understanding to "coordinate research and technical activities related to the human genome."
- April 11, 1996 – Human DNA sequencing begins with pilot studies at six universities in the United States.
- March 1999 – Large-scale sequencing of the human genome begins.
- April 2003 – The National Human Genome Research Institute (NHGRI) celebrates the completion of the human genome sequence, the 50th anniversary of the description of the DNA double helix and the publication of the vision document for the future of genomics research.
- May 4, 2007 – The National Human Genome Research Institute (NHGRI) and the National Cancer Institute (NCI), have teamed with Group Health Cooperative in Seattle and Henry Ford Health System in Detroit to launch the Multiplex Initiative, a study to investigate the interest level of healthy, young adults in receiving genetic testing for eight common conditions.
- May 28, 2008 – Francis S. Collins steps down as director of the institute after serving for fifteen of the nineteen years of its operation. Alan Edward Guttmacher has been appointed acting director while a new permanent director is sought.
- November 17, 2009 – NIH Appoints Eric D. Green, M.D., Ph.D. to be director of The National Human Genome Research Institute. It is the first time an institute director has risen to lead the entire NIH and subsequently picked his own successor.

== Directors ==
List of NHGRI directors since 1989.

No.	Portrait	Director	Took office	Left office	Refs.
1		James Watson	1989	April 10, 1992	
acting		Michael M. Gottesman	April 11, 1992	April 3, 1993	
2		Francis Collins (Note: Became 16th NIH director.)	April 4, 1993	August 1, 2008	
acting		Alan Edward Guttmacher	August 2, 2008	November 30, 2009	
3		Eric D. Green (Note: Contract not renewed)	December 1, 2009	March 17, 2025	
acting		Vence L. Bonham Jr. (Note: On administrative leave since April 1, 2025)	March 17, 2025	April 2025	
acting		Carolyn Hutter	April 2025	Present	

Table notes:

== CEER centers ==
In 1990 as part of the Human Genome Project, the NHGRI dedicated 5% of its annual budget to explore the ethical, legal, and social implications of genomic research. This program's current priorities focus on the ethical applications of genomics to as it applies to communities, families, and individuals in areas such as healthcare, research, defense, intellectual property, regulation, policy, and larger social issues. In 2004 the ELSI program established several Centers for Excellence in ELSI research (CEER). It was funded with substantial contributions from the U.S. Department of Energy and the National Institute of Child Health and Human Development. CEER centers have a common focus on the ethical, social, and legal implications resulting from the advances in genomic research.

The initial centers were

- Case Western Reserve University's Center for Genetic Research Ethics and Law (CGREAL); Eric Juengst, Ph.D., $5.3 million
- The Duke Center for the Study of Public Genomics; Robert Cook-Deegan, M.D., $4.8 million
- Stanford University School of Medicine's Center for Integration of Research on Genetics and Ethics; Mildred Cho, Ph.D., $3.8 million
- University of Washington's Center for Genomics and Healthcare Equality; Wylie Burke, M.D., Ph.D., $4.7 million

This center is focused on equitable distribution and use of translational genome research in underserved and marginalized communities. CGHE has several cores working to address different lenses of health disparities, genomic research, and outreach education. These cores include the Partnership core, the Genome Sciences core, the Healthcare Decision-making core and the Indigenous Genomics Alliance.

== Funding ==
The NHGRI is publicly funded. In support of moving to a translational model, the NHGRI published their funding mechanisms for ELSI research. FY 2020 NIH funding was $650.6 million.

== See also ==
- Julie Segre, chief and senior investigator of the Translational and Functional Genomics Branch
- Ellen Sidransky, chief of the Molecular Neurogenetics Section
- Tara Matise, Head of Computational Genetics at Rutgers University and Director of the Coordinating Center for the NHGRI Genome Sequencing Program
- Talking Glossary of Genetic Terms
- Human reference genome
