= Vence L. Bonham Jr. =

American lawyer

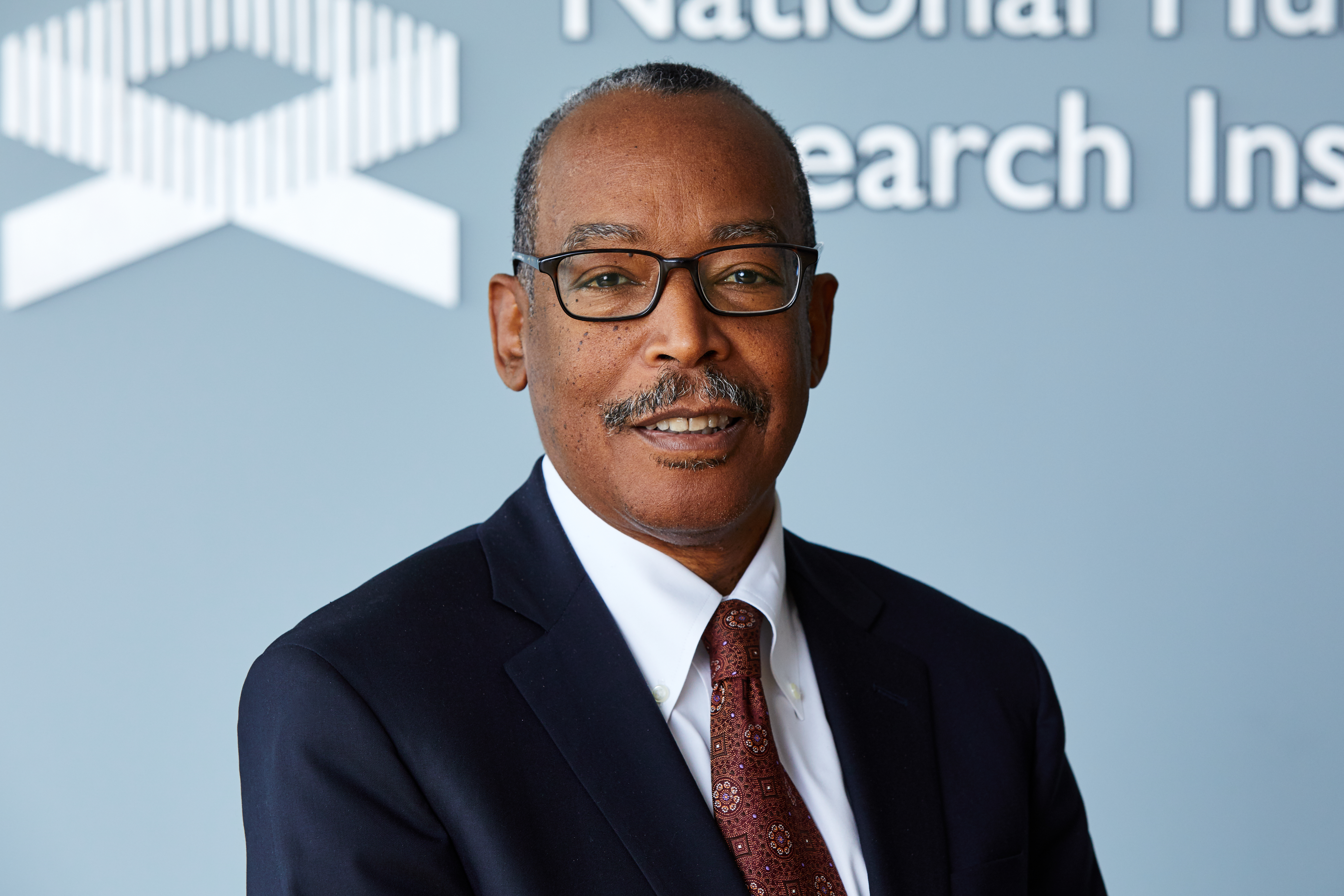
- Education: Michigan State University (BA); Ohio State University (JD)

Vence L. Bonham Jr. is an American lawyer who is the president and chief executive officer of the Diaspora Human Genomics Institute at Meharry Medical College, and founding director of the Meharry Center for Bioethics, Social and Behavioral Research. Previously, he was the acting director of the National Human Genome Research Institute (NHGRI) of the U.S. National Institutes of Health and the leader of the NHGRI Health Disparities Unit. His research focuses on social determinants of health, particularly with regard to the social implications of new genomic knowledge and technologies.

== Early life, education, and career ==
Bonham's mother was a school social worker and his father was a science teacher.

Bonham eearned his Bachelor of Arts degree from Michigan State University in 1978. He taught middle school history and social studies before earning his Juris Doctor degree from Ohio State University Moritz College of Law in 1982.

He began his career in healthcare law, and then obtained a Health Services Research Fellowship from the American Association of Medical Colleges. He taught health policy and bioethics to medical students at Michigan State for a number of years before starting at the NHGRI in 2002.

He is a member of the NIH Tribal Health Research Coordinating Committee.

== Research ==
=== Health policy ===
Bonham has contributed to guidelines highlighting issues such as maintaining a focus on improving health, striving for global diversity, maximizing the usability of genomics for the general public, and promoting robust and consistent standards for genomic research. His ongoing work addresses the balance of scientific progress, and ethical and equitable treatment of people.

=== Genomics and health disparities ===
As director of the Health Disparities Unit at NHGRI, Bonham leads a team that aims to achieve health equity in the context of genomic medicine, where genomic knowledge, access to genomic services (testing and counseling), and unbiased implementation of genomic medicine are accessible and applied globally and fairly across all populations.

He has organized and advocated for the development of improved laws surrounding the application of genomics in a clinical setting and precision medicine to better serve underrepresented communities. In an attempt to assess the knowledge and perception of race and human variation by clinicians, Bonham and colleagues have developed three scales: Genetic Variation Knowledge Assessment Index (GKAI), Health Professionals Beliefs about Race (HPBR), and Racial Attributes in Clinical Evaluation (RACE).

=== Sickle cell disease ===
Bonham has published on the treatment, screening, and study of patients with sickle cell disease (SCD) and is an expert on the history and emerging science regarding this condition. In his role at the NHGRI, he leads the INSIGHTS program (The Insights into Microbiome and Environmental Contributions to Sickle Cell Disease and Leg Ulcers Study), a longitudinal interdisciplinary study exploring sickle cell disease in adults that covers genomic, microbial, physical, and social influences. He sees SCD as a condition that highlights and demonstrates healthcare disparities "where the outcomes and the experiences are evidence of not getting the necessary treatments and focus historically." This makes SCD an important disease to study through the lenses of healthcare equity and justice. With Lisa E. Smilan, he wrote an article for the North Carolina Law Review in 2019 regarding the legal and ethical considerations of somatic gene editing in sickle cell disease.

Bonham and his research group are moving forward with the World Health Organization and investigators in Sierra Leone to study adults with SCD, to increase utilization of newborn screening, and to address the ethical and logistical considerations of curative therapies in a developing country.

=== Ethics of genome-editing ===
With the emergence of gene editing technologies such as CRISPR, Bonham has emphasized that SCD is a critical example of the value of respect for persons, fairness, and worldwide collaboration as genomic technology continues to evolve. Clinical trials for one of the first attempts in somatic cell genome editing using CRISPR technology are for the treatment of sickle cell disease. he and his colleagues have published multiple peer-reviewed studies identifying gaps in knowledge of trial participants that could prevent them from giving adequately informed consent. He highlights the importance of engaging with the SCD patient community with regard to scientific developments in treatment and management of the disease and prioritizing their protection and equitable care.

== Personal life ==
Bonham and his wife live in Bethesda, Maryland, and have two sons.

He considers himself an art lover, and has a collection of primarily African-American art.
