= Michael M. Gottesman =

American biochemist (born 1946)

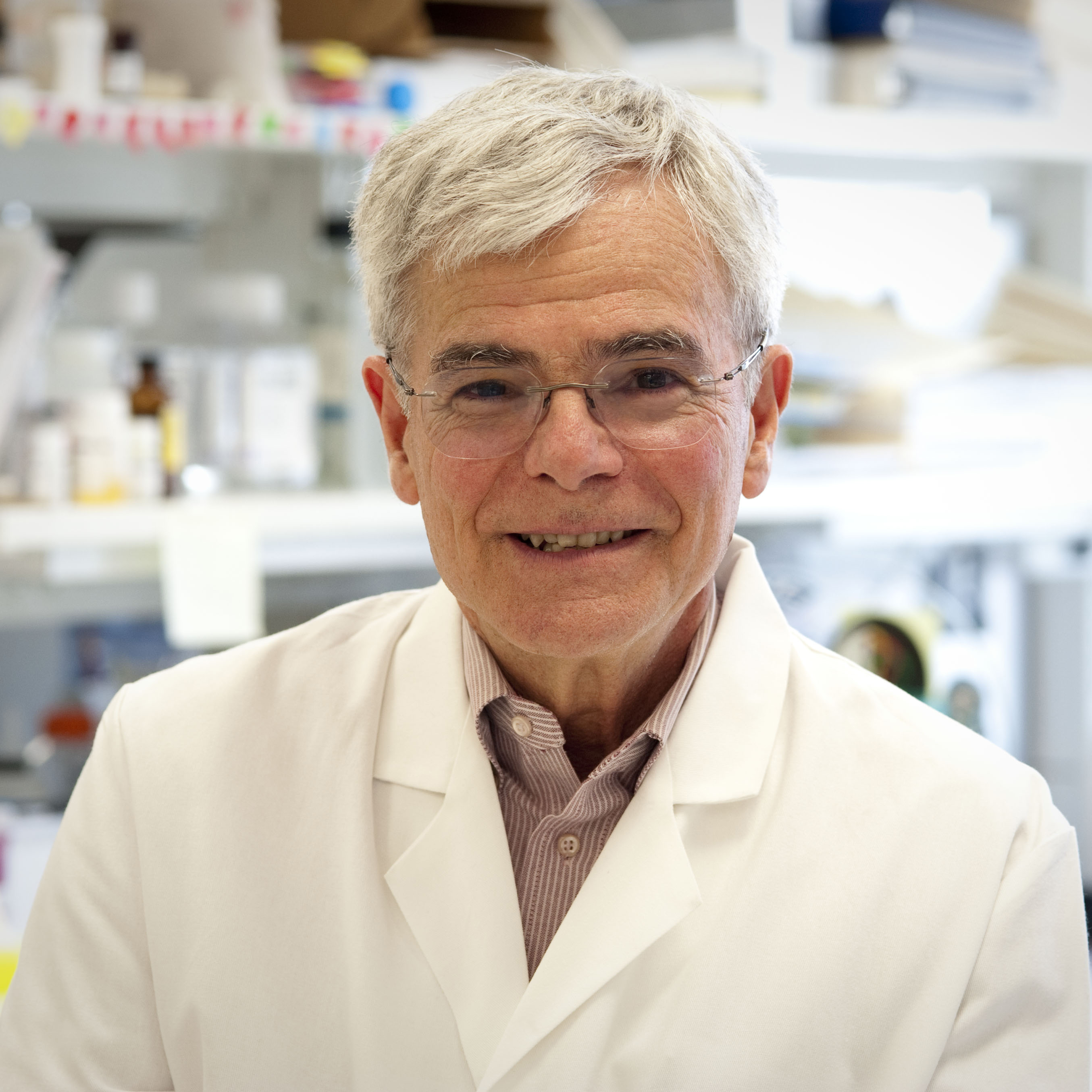
- Born: October 7, 1946 (age 79); Jersey City, New Jersey, U.S.
- Education: Harvard University
- Known for: Impact of silent polymorphisms on tertiary structure and function
- Spouse: Susan Gottesman
- Children: Rebecca Gottesman
- Scientific career
- Fields: Biochemistry
- Workplaces: Peter Dent Brigham Hospital, Boston; Harvard University; National Institutes of Health

Michael Marc Gottesman (born October 7, 1946, in Jersey City, New Jersey) is an American biochemist and physician-scientist. He was the deputy director (Intramural) of the National Institutes of Health (NIH) in the United States and also Chief of the Laboratory of Cell Biology at the National Cancer Institute (NCI) within the NIH.

== Early life and education ==
He graduated summa cum laude in biochemical sciences in 1966 from Harvard College, and received his M.D. magna cum laude from Harvard Medical School in 1970.

Gottesman completed his internship and residency at the Peter Bent Brigham Hospital in Boston, Massachusetts.

== Career ==
Gottesman was an assistant professor at Harvard for one year before taking a permanent position at the NIH in 1976.

He served as deputy director of the NIH Intramural Research Program from 1994-2022. On August 1, 2022, Gottesman was succeeded as director of the NIH Intramural Research Program by pediatric neurologist Nina F. Schor. As of 2023, he serves as the deputy director of intramural research and is chief of the Laboratory of Cell Biology.

He is a senior investigator at the Laboratory of Cell Biology with the National Institutes of Health.

== Research ==
His areas of expertise includes contribution to the discovery of P-glycoprotein (MDR1, ABCB1), the multidrug resistance efflux transporter associated with clinical resistance to anti-cancer agents. In 2007, he reported for the first time in Science magazine that silent polymorphisms can impact the tertiary structure and function of a protein.

== Awards and distinctions ==
Gottesman is an elected member of the American Association for the Advancement of Science (1988), the National Academy of Medicine (2003), the Association of American Physicians (2006), the American Academy of Arts and Sciences (2010), and the National Academy of Sciences (2018).

Gottesman received the 2013 Paul A. Volcker Career Achievement Award, and in 2018, the American Medical Association (AMA) awarded Gottesman the Dr. Nathan Davis Award for Outstanding Government Service.
