= James Gilman (disambiguation) =

James Gilman or Gillman may refer to:

- James K. Gilman, United States Army general
- Jim Gilman (James Joseph Gilman, 1870–1912), baseball third baseman
- James Gilman (cricketer) (1879–1976), English cricketer
- James Gillman, physician who tried to cure Samuel Taylor Coleridge's opium addiction
- James Gillman, one of the founders of Wesley College, Sheffield
- James Franklin Gilman (1850–1929), artist
