= Cherry v. Mathews (1976) =

Cherry v. Mathews, 419 F. Supp. 922 (1976), is a case in which the United States District Court, District of Columbia, in which the court plaintiffs filed actions to the Secretary of Health, Education and Welfare to compel regulations implementing Section 504 of the Rehabilitation Act of 1973. The order for the defendants' motion for summary Judgment was denied for lacking explicit duty to issues regulations and other civil right and similar statutes rulemaking authority (non-discrimination on account of sex, race, color or national origin) .

== Background ==
James L. Cherry was a research patient at the National Institutes of Health (NIH) in Bethesda, Maryland who had muscle illness that had him quadriplegic and was fighting cancer that was discovered during research. As a person with a disability, James received negative responses from the US Dept. of Health, Education and Welfare (HEW), arguing they had no legal duty to issue a regulation under Section 504 that was a mere policy statement. James disagreed and started contacting national disability groups and disabled persons in the Washington area, but was not able to acquire the support was needed for him. During medical procedures and fighting with cancer, contacted the Institute for Public Representation (INSPIRE) at Georgetown University Law Center in Washington, DC who took the case. Also, he contacted members of Action League for Physically Handicapped Adults (ALPHA) from Louisville, Kentucky to join as co-plaintiff who agreed to launch the Section 504 case against Davis Mathews, secretary of HEW. The District Court concludes that the Secretary is required putting to effect the section 504 regulations.

== Decision ==
The Cherry v Mathews case was decided in James Cherry’s favor. The US District Court in July 19 of 1976, ordered DHEW to develop the Section 504 regulations to prohibit discrimination against people with disabilities. The statute says: “No otherwise qualified handicapped individual in the United States, as defined in [29 U.S.C s 706(6), as amended], shall, solely by reason of his handicap, be excluded from the participation in, be denied the benefits of, or be subjected to discrimination under any program or activity receiving Federal financial assistance.”
