= Niki Moutsopoulos =

Greek periodontist and immunologist

- Νίκη Μουτσόπουλος
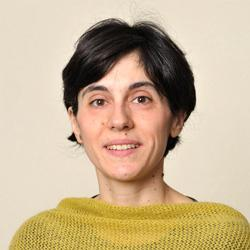
- Education: Aristotle University of Thessaloniki (DDS); University of Maryland School of Dentistry (PhD)
- Awards: Member, National Academy of Medicine (2024)
- Scientific career
- Fields: Oral immunology, periodontitis
- Workplaces: National Institute of Dental and Craniofacial Research
- Thesis: Dissection of factors contributing to HIV susceptibility in mucosal associated lymphoid tissues (2006)
- Doctoral advisor: Sharon Wahl

Niki M. Moutsopoulos (Greek: Νίκη Μουτσόπουλος) is a Greek periodontist and immunologist. She is a senior investigator in the oral immunity and infection section at the National Institute of Dental and Craniofacial Research. Moutsopoulos specializes in oral immunology and periodontitis. Her research program focuses on host-microbial interactions that can drive chronic inflammatory responses and tissue destruction in the oral cavity.

== Education ==
Moutsopoulos received a DDS degree from the Aristotle University of Thessaloniki in 1998. In 2003, she completed a certificate in periodontics at the University of Maryland School of Dentistry where she completed a PhD in immunology in 2006 in the department of diagnostic sciences and pathology. Her dissertation was titled Dissection of factors contributing to HIV susceptibility in mucosal associated lymphoid tissues. She completed graduate research in the laboratory of her doctoral advisor Sharon Wahl at the National Institute of Dental and Craniofacial Research (NIDCR). She was a research fellow at NIDCR from 2006 to 2008. Her doctorate and post doctorate work focused on immune-mediated pathologies that present in the oral cavity including Sjögren syndrome, periodontal disease and chronic wound healing. While these are distinct disease entities, they share as a salient feature non-resolving inflammation and immune mediated tissue destruction of which the mechanisms have been in the center of her research interest. Activation of chronic inflammatory pathways in various disease entities have been linked to genetic susceptibility of the host, though emerging evidence implicates microbial factors for the initiation of disease pathogenesis for the majority of chronic inflammatory and autoimmune pathologies.

== Career and research ==
Moutsopoulos is a periodontist, trained in immunology. Moutsopoulos has worked as a clinical fellow at the NIH under the mentorship of Steven Holland from 2008 to 2010. In 2007, she became an adjunct clinical assistant professor in the department of periodontics at the University of Maryland School of Dentistry. Since 2010, she has been an independent investigator at NIDCR building a clinical and translational program focused on basic oral immunology and susceptibility to periodontitis through the study of patients with monogenic immune defects. She is a senior investigator in the oral immunity and infection section at NIDCR.

Moutsopoulos's program focuses on host-microbial interactions that can drive chronic inflammatory responses and tissue destruction in the oral cavity. In her laboratory host-microbial interactions are interrogated through the use of in vitro culture systems and animal models, but her primary focus is on the study of immune-microbial interactions in humans. For this her laboratory is interrogating the oral microbiome and immune responses in the oral cavity in patient populations with oral inflammatory conditions. Moutosopoulos researches oral-barrier immunity. Her studies implement a bench to bedside approach and aim to understand the molecular and cellular basis of oral immunity in health, and in the common inflammatory disease of periodontitis. Understanding the mechanisms that microbial triggers and host elements use to regulate oral immunity in health and disease is the focus of her research program.

== See also ==
- List of female scientists in the 21st century
- Timeline of women in science in the United States
- Women in dentistry in the United States
