= Steven M. Holland (physician) =

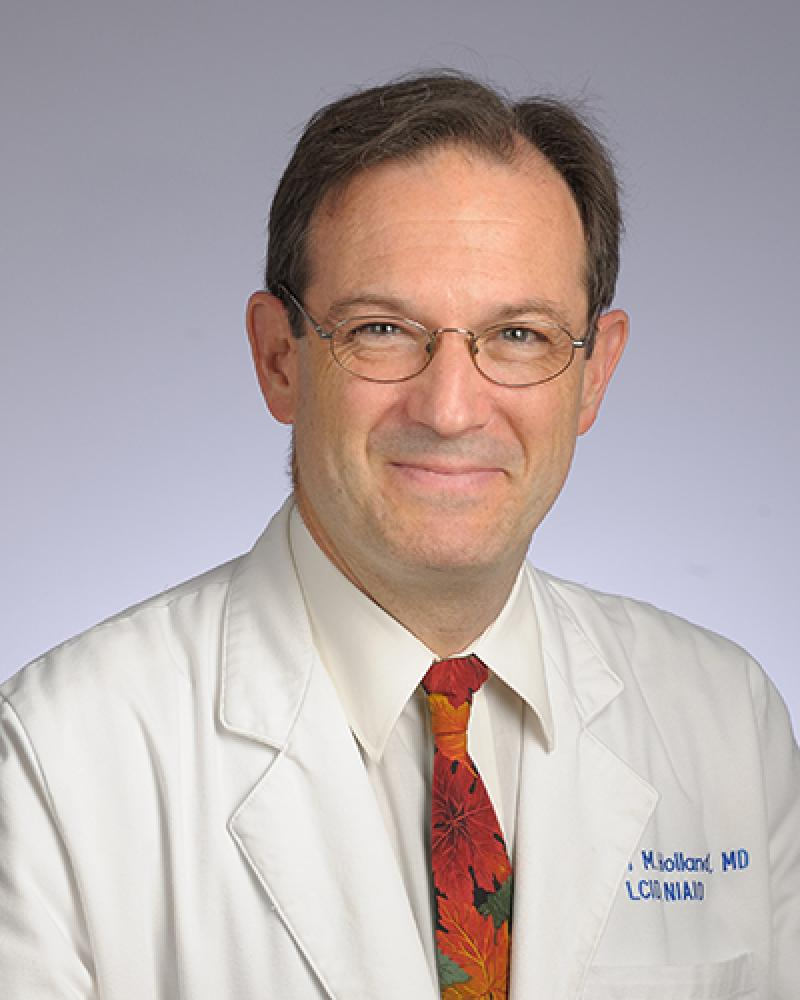
- Holland in 2009
- Education: St. John's College; Johns Hopkins University
- Spouse: Maryland Pao (m. 1987)
- Scientific career
- Fields: Infectious disease, clinical immunology, immunopathology
- Workplaces: National Institutes of Health

Steven M. Holland is an American physician-scientist specializing in infectious diseases, clinical immunology, and immunopathology. He has served as director of the division of intramural research at the National Institute of Allergy and Infectious Diseases (NIAID) since 2016 and chief of its immunopathogenesis section since 2000. Holland researches primary immunodeficiencies and the genetic basis of susceptibility to infections.

== Early life and education ==
Holland was born to Jimmie C. and James F. Holland. He completed a B.A. from St. John's College. He received a M.D. from the Johns Hopkins School of Medicine in 1983, where he stayed as a resident in internal medicine, assistant chief of service in medicine, and fellow in infectious diseases.

Holland came to National Institute of Allergy and Infectious Diseases (NIAID) in 1989 as a National Research Council fellow in Sundararajan Venkatesan's section in the Laboratory of Molecular Microbiology, working on rev-mediated transcriptional regulation of HIV.

== Career ==
In 1991, Holland joined John I. Gallin's in the NIAID Laboratory of Host Defenses (LHD), shifting his research to the host side, with a focus on phagocyte defects and their associated infections. His work in the LHD centered on the pathogenesis and management of chronic granulomatous disease, as well as other congenital immune defects affecting phagocytes. Holland was tenured in 2000 and became chief of the immunopathogenesis section, which now resides within NIAID Laboratory of Clinical Immunology and Microbiology (LCIM). In 2004, he became chief of the newly created Laboratory of Clinical Infectious Diseases. He also began serving as deputy director for NIH Intramural Clinical Research in 2011. He became director, NIAID Division of Intramural Research (DIR) in 2016. He is a NIH distinguished investigator. Holland is a member of the National Academy of Medicine.

Holland's research areas of special interest have included chronic granulomatous disease, Job's syndrome (autosomal dominant STAT3 deficiency) and the genetic conditions predisposing people to mycobacterial infections, including GATA2 deficiency. He has been interested in genetic conditions associated with severe coccidioidomycosis and acquired forms of anticytokine autoimmunity predisposing to opportunistic infections.

== Personal life ==
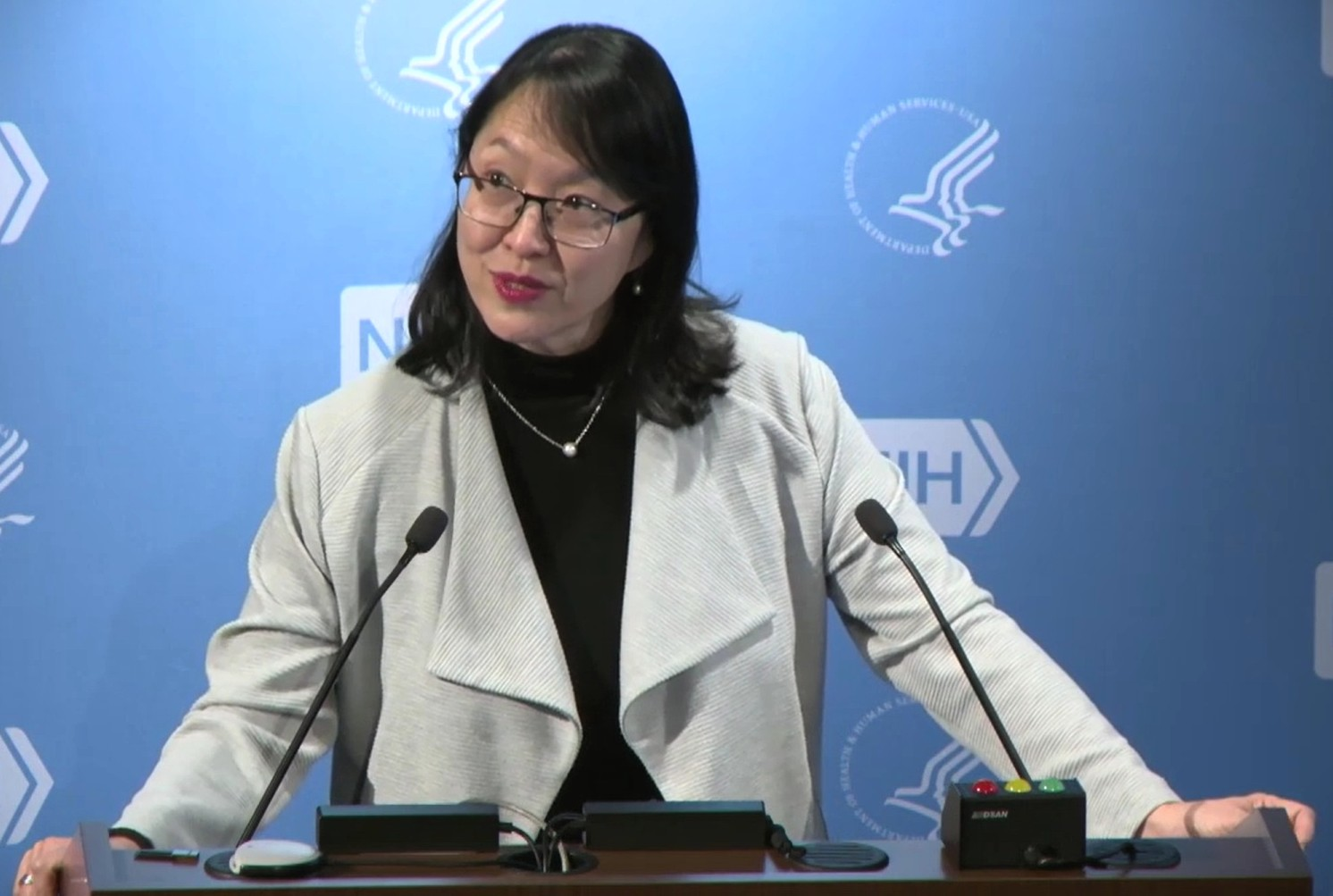
Maryland Pao in 2023

Holland married physician Maryland Pao on June 5, 1987 at the Cosmos Club.
