= Maryland Pao =

- Education: Wellesley College; Johns Hopkins University
- Spouse: Steven M. Holland (m. 1987)
- Scientific career
- Fields: Pediatrics, liaison psychiatry
- Workplaces: National Institutes of Health

Maryland Pao is an American psychiatrist and physician-scientist serving as the clinical director and deputy scientific director at the National Institute of Mental Health's NIH Intramural Research Program. She is a consultation liaison psychiatrist who researches the interactions between medical and psychiatric symptoms in pediatric oncology, pediatric HIV and other primary immunodeficiencies.

== Early life and education ==
Pao was born to Pearl and Ping-Nie Pao. She is from Bethesda, Maryland. She attended Wellesley College before completing a B.A.-M.D. program at the Johns Hopkins School of Medicine. Pao completed pediatric and psychiatric residency training as well as a child and adolescent psychiatry fellowship at Johns Hopkins Hospital. She is board certified in pediatrics (1994, 2001), general psychiatry (1994), child and adolescent psychiatry (1994) and consultation liaison psychiatry (2008, 2018).

== Career ==
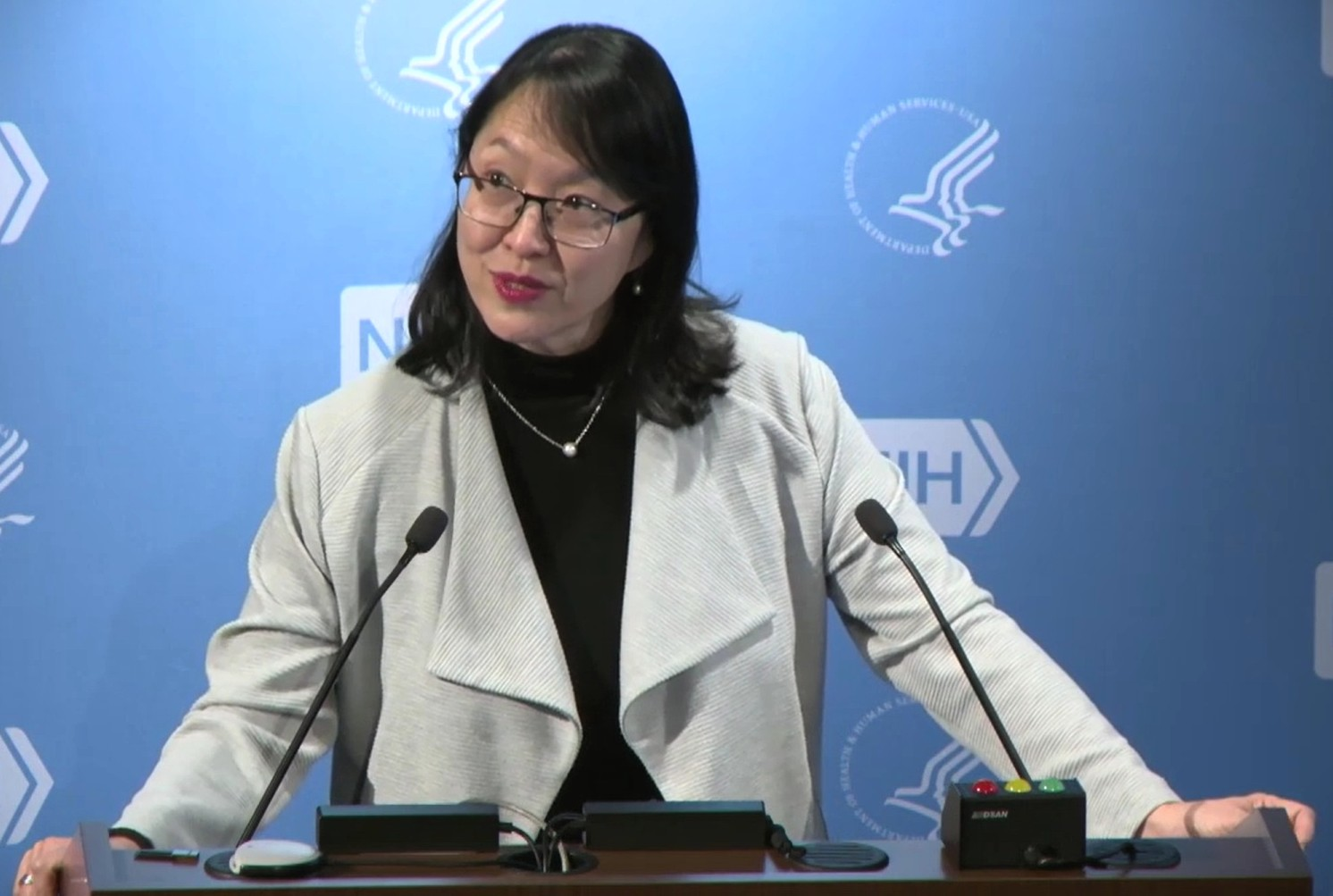
Pao speaking in 2023

From 2008 to 2019, Pao was chief of the psychiatry consultation liaison service in the National Institutes of Health (NIH) Hatfield Clinical Research Center. She is an attending physician at Hatfield. She is clinical director and deputy scientific director of the National Institute of Mental Health's NIH Intramural Research Program.

Pao's core research interests are in the interactions between medical and psychiatric symptoms in pediatric oncology, pediatric HIV and other primary immunodeficiencies. She studies distress and its correlates including suicidal thoughts and behaviors in medically ill children.

Pao is a recipient of the 2012 American Academy of Child and Adolescent Psychiatry (AACAP) Simon Wile Award for excellence in pediatric consultation liaison psychiatry. She received the 2022 AACAP Virginia Q. Anthony Outstanding Woman Leader Award. In 2023, Pao received a U.S. Secretary of Health and Human Services' commendation in recognition of exceptional leadership and dedicated service to the Department and to the Nation during the declared public health emergency phase of the COVID-19 pandemic. She is a past President of the Academy of Consultation Liaison Psychiatry. She is a professor on the clinical faculty at Georgetown University, George Washington University and at Johns Hopkins School of Medicine.

== Personal life ==
Pao married physician-scientist Steven M. Holland on June 5, 1987 at the Cosmos Club. She has a daughter.
