= Hymera, Indiana =

- Town
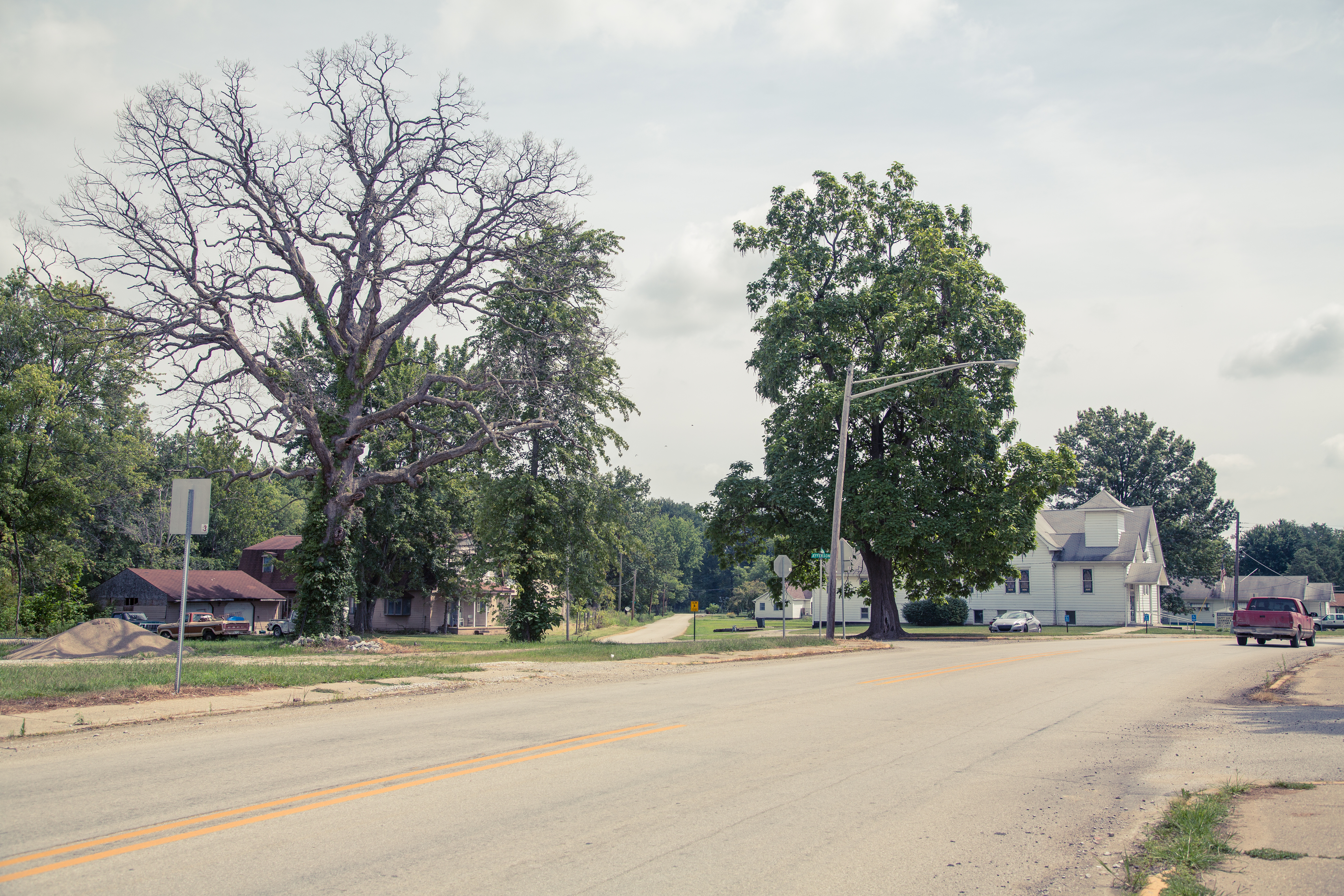

- Location of Hymera in Sullivan County, Indiana.
- Coordinates: 39°11′8″N 87°18′0″W
- Country: United States
- State: Indiana
- County: Sullivan
- Township: Jackson

Area
  - Total: 0.71 sq mi (1.84 km^{2})
  - Land: 0.71 sq mi (1.84 km^{2})
  - Water: 0 sq mi (0.00 km^{2})
- Elevation: 520 ft (160 m)

Population (2020)
  - Total: 653
  - Density: 916.9/sq mi (354.02/km^{2})
- Time zone: UTC-5 (EST)
  - Summer (DST): UTC-5 (EST)
- ZIP code: 47855
- Area code: 812
- FIPS code: 18-35500
- GNIS feature ID: 436673

Hymera is a town in and the principal center of Jackson Township, Sullivan County, in the U.S. state of Indiana. As of the 2020 census, Hymera had a population of 653.

== Geography ==
According to the 2010 census, Hymera has a total area of 0.71 square miles (1.84 km^{2}), all land. It is part of the Terre Haute Metropolitan Statistical Area. The primary coordinate point for Hymera is located at latitude 39.1859 and longitude -87.2989 in Sullivan County. Sullivan County is in the Eastern time zone (GMT -5). The elevation is 525 feet.

== Demographics ==
Historical population
Census	Pop.	Note	%±
1910	1,515		—
1920	1,599		5.5%
1930	1,152		−28.0%
1940	1,298		12.7%
1950	1,069		−17.6%
1960	1,015		−5.1%
1970	907		−10.6%
1980	1,054		16.2%
1990	771		−26.9%
2000	833		8.0%
2010	801		−3.8%
2020	653		−18.5%
U.S. Decennial Census

=== 2010 census ===
As of the census of 2010, there were 801 people, 306 households, and 215 families residing in the town. The population density was 1,128.2 inhabitants per square mile (435.6/km^{2}). There were 364 housing units at an average density of 512.7 per square mile (198.0/km^{2}). The racial makeup of the town was 99.0% White, 0.2% Native American, and 0.7% from two or more races. Hispanic or Latino of any race were 0.1% of the population.

There were 306 households, of which 36.9% had children under the age of 18 living with them, 48.4% were married couples living together, 15.0% had a female householder with no husband present, 6.9% had a male householder with no wife present, and 29.7% were non-families. 26.1% of all households were made up of individuals, and 11.4% had someone living alone who was 65 years of age or older. The average household size was 2.62 and the average family size was 3.14.

The median age in the town was 37.5 years. 28% of residents were under the age of 18; 6.1% were between the ages of 18 and 24; 25.8% were from 25 to 44; 27.3% were from 45 to 64; and 12.7% were 65 years of age or older. The gender makeup of the town was 49.7% male and 50.3% female.

== Schools ==
Students from Hymera attend Northeast East Elementary (grades K–6), and North Central High School (grades 7–12) located in Farmersburg, Indiana.

== Local attractions ==
The primary local attractions are Shakamak State Park and the Minnehaha Fish and Wildlife Area.

== History ==
During pioneer times, the area was settled by the Methodists for the Bethel Church. A log building once stood within the limits of the present town, where the early settlers assembled for religious worship. On Busseron Creek was a grist mill erected about 1829. On the westside was one of the first coal mines of the county; it was owned by H. K. and Harvey Wilson. The coal was used chiefly by local blacksmiths.

Hymera was platted as a townsite circa 1870 by Nathan Hinkle.

Robert Linn had a general store on the site now occupied by the Odd Fellows block. For some years the store and post office, and two or three shops, comprised the business of the place.

When the post office was established the name Pittsburg was selected by the local community, in honor of William Pitt who owned the land on which Hymera was founded. However, the name was not accepted by the postal department. The post office was then established under the name Hymera, and has been in operation since 1855.

The origin of the name Hymera is credited to John Badders, who was postmaster. He had an adopted daughter, Mary.

The change of name for the village was accomplished in 1890. In April of that year, a petition from nearly all the voters of Pittsburg was laid before the county commissioners asking that the name of the town as recorded on the plat be changed to Hymera. A short time previously, on the opening of the new mine at Alum Cave, the new town laid out there was called New Pittsburg, while the Hymera community in distinction was referred to as Old Pittsburg. The resulting confusion brought about the change in name. About this time a branch line of railroad reached up to the coal mines in the vicinity, which led to tremendous growth. In 1902 Hymera was incorporated into a town. That July, the first election for town officers was held.

One of the memorable days in the history of Hymera was the celebration in October 1904, known as Mitchell Day, in honor of John Mitchell, the president of the United Mine Workers of America. The crowd in town was estimated at over seven-thousand. A delegation met Mitchell at Terre Haute, and the local procession was made up of the K. of P. Band, labor organizations, and school children. The ceremonies of the day centered about the unveiling of a monument to Nathan Hinkle, the Revolutionary soldier who was buried in the Hymera Cemetery. Hon. James S. Barcus, a great-grandson of Hinkle, delivered an address, and Miss Mamie Asbury, a great-granddaughter, assisted in the unveiling. The monument is fifteen feet high, representing a Revolutionary soldier at parade rest. The other events of the day were held in the Zink Grove, where speeches were made by Rev. A. P. Asbury and Robert W. Miers and John C. Chaney, and the principal address of the afternoon was delivered by Mitchell himself.

In the fall of 1905, Mitchell was reported to have said that Hymera was the neatest mining town in the United States, with more and better sidewalks according to its size than any town in the county, and many improvements indicating a progressive spirit among the citizens.

At the time, there were five church organization, the Methodist, Baptist, Presbyterian, United Brethren and Christian, the first two having good buildings, while the Presbyterians and U. B. were preparing to build. A five-room school building had proved inadequate, and a four-room addition was added in the summer of 1905. The Hymera State Bank, which had been organized in December 1903, as the Bank of Hymera, by S. M. Patton and R. I. Ladd, was reorganized as a state bank in January 1906, with Mr. Ladd as President and Mr. Patton, Cashier.

== Famous residents ==
- James K. Gilman, a retired U.S. Army Major General, Physician and chief executive officer of the National Institute of Health Clinical Center in Besthesda, Maryland, was born in Hymera in 1952.
