= James K. Gilman =

United States Army general

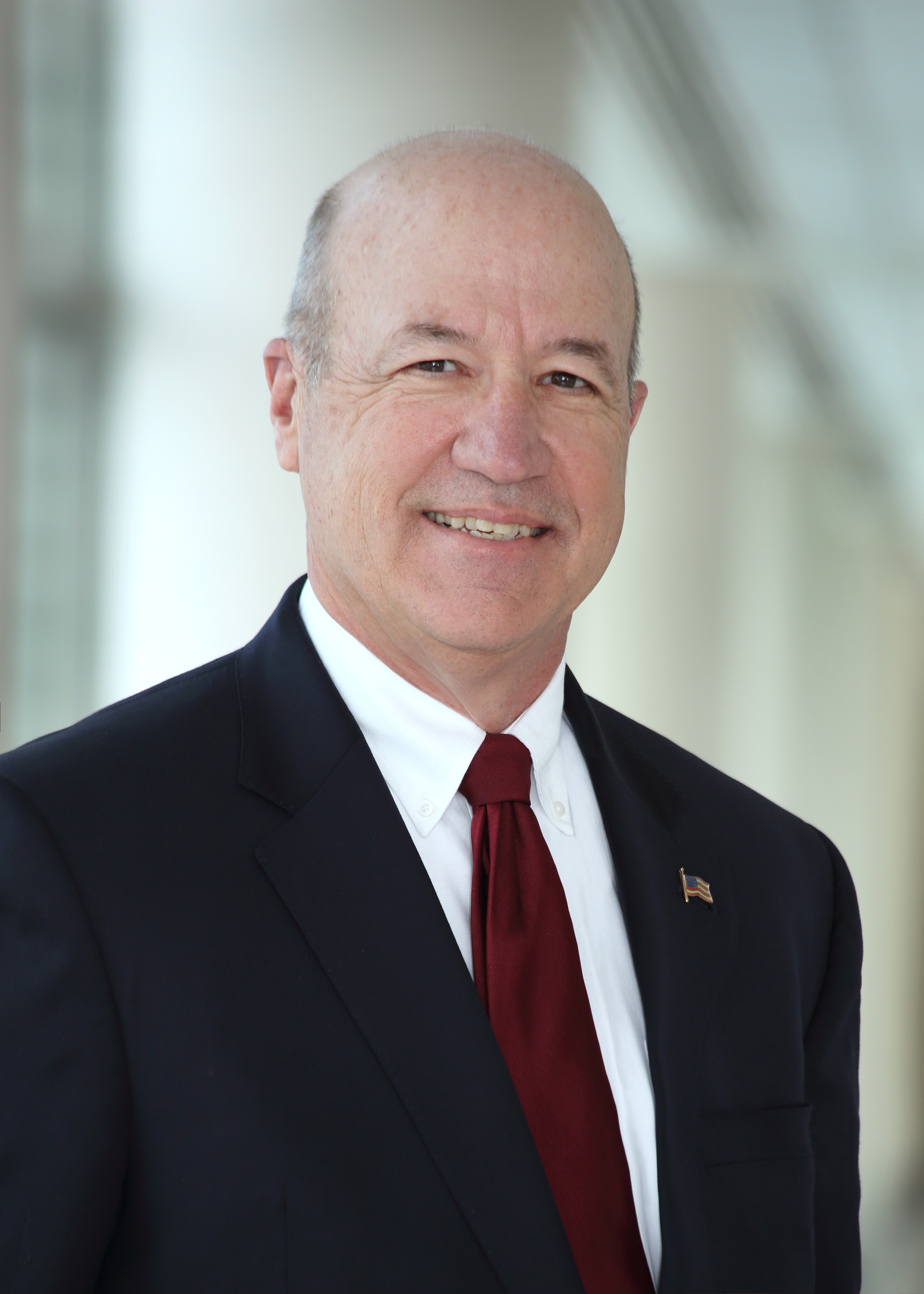
- Born: Hymera, Indiana
- Education: Rose-Hulman Institute of Technology, United States Army War College, Indiana University School of Medicine
- Scientific career
- Fields: Internal medicine, Cardiovascular disease
- Workplaces: NIH Clinical Center, Johns Hopkins Military & Veterans Institute, United States Army

James K. Gilman, a retired United States Army Major General and physician from Hymera, Indiana, became the first chief executive officer of the NIH Clinical Center Jan. 9, 2017. The NIH Clinical Center is the largest hospital devoted to clinical research in the United States.

== Biography ==
Gilman is from Hymera, Indiana and after graduating from Rose-Hulman Institute of Technology with a degree in Biological Engineering in 1974 he went to Indiana University School of Medicine and received his MD in 1978.

== Military career ==
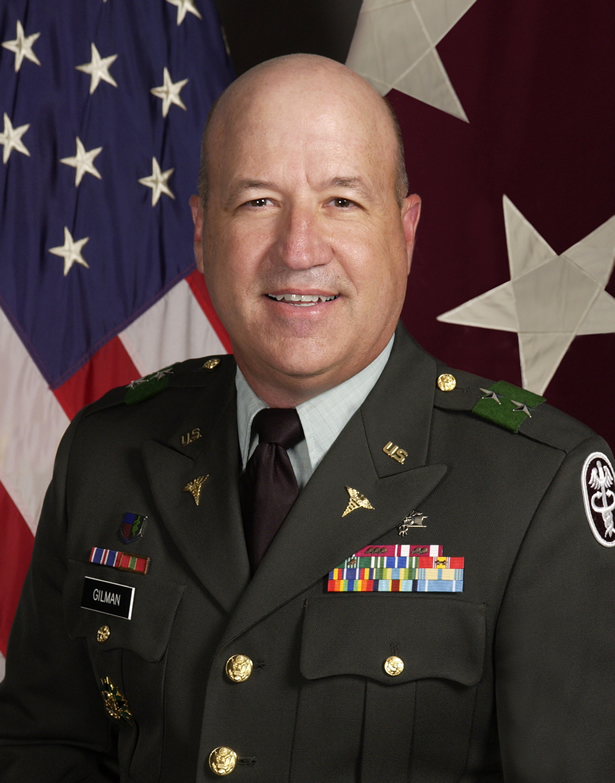
Maj. Gen. James K. Gilman

Following a medical internship and residency in internal medicine at Brooke Army Medical Center (BAMC), he served as the chief resident in medicine at BAMC. His next assignment was as the staff internist and chief, Internal Medicine Service, U.S. Army Medical Department Activity, Nurnberg, Germany. He then returned to BAMC where he completed a fellowship in cardiovascular diseases and serve as a staff cardiologist. In 1991, he completed a fellowship in clinical cardiac electrophysiology at the University of Texas Health Science Center at Houston, Texas. He then served as chief of Cardiac Electrophysiology and assistant chief of the Cardiology Service, Brooke Army Medical Center. From 1994 until 1997, he served as chief of Cardiology and Cardiology Fellowship Program director at BAMC. In 1995, he deployed to Haiti with the 2nd Armored Cavalry Regiment in support of Operation Uphold Democracy.

Subsequent assignments include:

1. Deputy Commander for Clinical Services, Darnall Army Community Hospital, Fort Hood, Texas
2. Deputy Commander for Clinical Services, Madigan Army Medical Center
3. Commander, Bassett Army Community Hospital, Fort Wainwright, Alaska
4. Acting Assistant Surgeon General for Force Projection, Office of the Surgeon General (OTSG)
5. Director, Health Policy and Services, OTSG
6. Commander, Walter Reed Health Care System
7. Commander, U.S. Army Medical Research and Materiel Command
8. Commander, Brooke Army Medical Center
9. Commander, Great Plains Regional Medical Command, San Antonio, Texas

He graduated from the Command and General Staff College and the Army War College. He is board certified in both Internal Medicine and Cardiovascular Diseases and is a fellow of the American College of Cardiology.

== Johns Hopkins Military & Veterans Institute ==
Following his retirement from the U.S. Army in 2013, Gilman was executive director of Johns Hopkins Military & Veterans Institute in Baltimore, Maryland, until June 2016. The Johns Hopkins Military and Veterans Health Institute applies the collective resources of Johns Hopkins Medicine to solve the health and health care problems of service members, veterans and their families.

== NIH Clinical Center CEO ==
Gilman became the first chief executive officer of the NIH Clinical Center Jan. 9, 2017.

During this time Gilman oversaw the day-to-day operations of the 200-bed research center on NIH's Bethesda, Maryland, campus.

In 2015, the NIH Clinical Center had about 6,000 inpatient admissions and 100,000 outpatient visits, all participants in clinical trials. Gilman guided the performance of the Clinical Center, focusing on setting a high bar for patient safety and quality of care including the development of new hospital operation policies.

== Personal life ==
He is married with three daughters.

== Awards and decorations ==
His military decorations include: Army Distinguished Service Medal, Legion of Merit (3 OLC), Meritorious Service Medal (2 OLC), the Army Staff Badge, and the Expert Field Medical Badge. He also received The Surgeon General's "A" Proficiency Designator and is a member of the Order of Military Medical Merit.
