= National Institutes of Health Clinical Center =

Research hospital in Maryland, US

Coordinates: 39°0′6″N 77°6′16″W

National Institutes of Health (NIH) Clinical Center
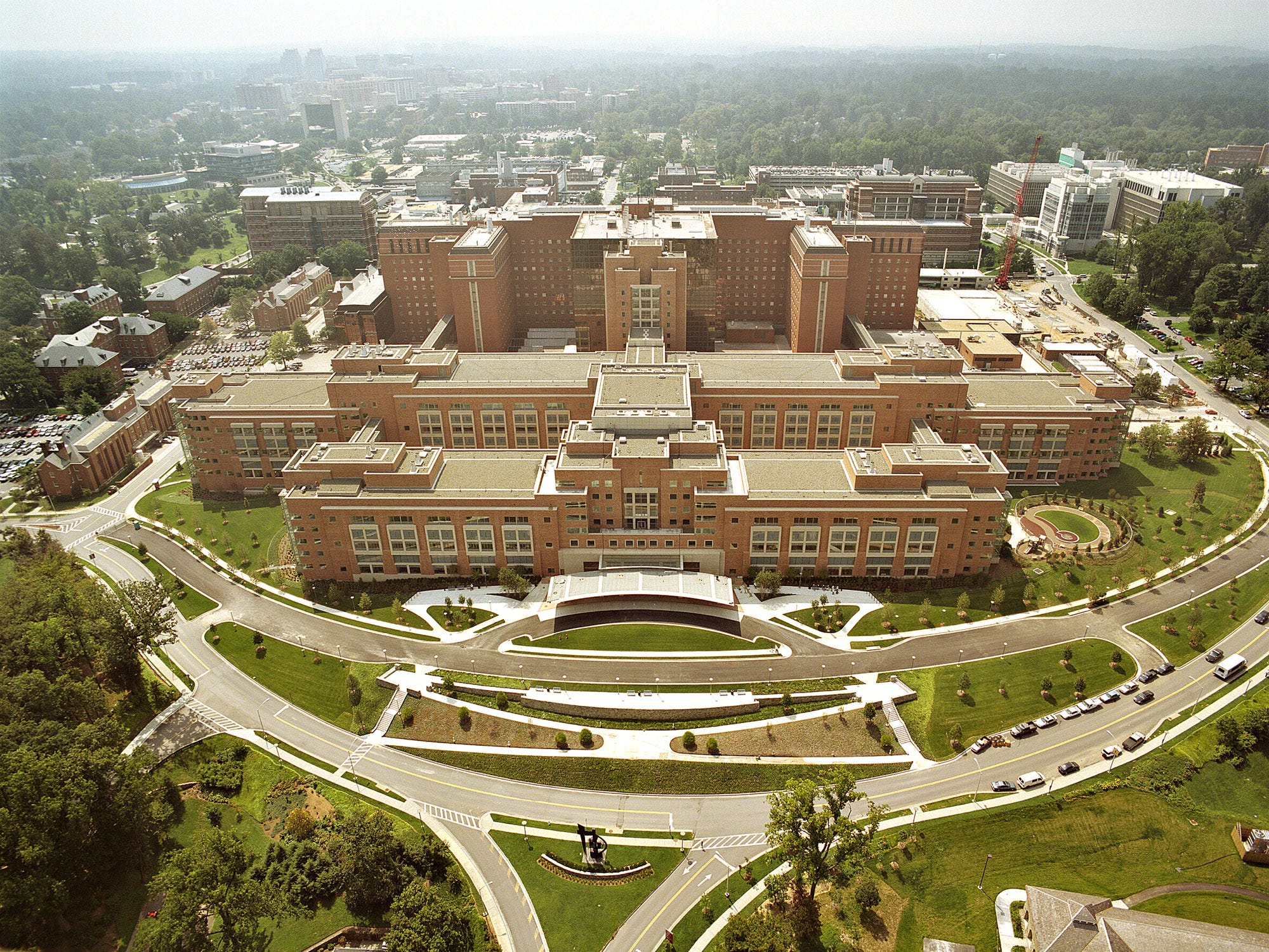
- Aerial photo of the NIH Mark O. Hatfield Clinical Research Center, Bethesda, Maryland

Agency overview
- Formed: 1953
- Jurisdiction: United States
- Headquarters: Bethesda, Maryland, U.S.
- Agency executive: James K. Gilman, CEO
- Parent agency: National Institutes of Health, Department of Health & Human Services
- Website: www.cc.nih.gov

The NIH Clinical Center is a hospital solely dedicated to clinical research at the National Institutes of Health campus in Bethesda, Maryland. The Clinical Center, known as Building 10, consists of the original part of the hospital, the Warren Grant Magnuson Clinical Center, and the newest addition, the Mark O. Hatfield Clinical Research Center. The two parts are connected to form one large building.

Since the hospital's opening in 1953, NIH scientists have worked with volunteer patients to create medical innovations. Clinical Center successes include pioneering the cure of cancerous solid tumors with chemotherapy; the use of nitroglycerin to treat heart attacks; identifying a genetic component in schizophrenia; conducting the first successful replacement of a mitral valve to treat heart disease; and the creation of blood tests to identify both Acquired Immune Deficiency Syndrome (AIDS) and hepatitis.

In October 2014, Clinical Center staff successfully treated one of the first few Ebola virus cases in the United States.

The Clinical Center has been a leader in the “bench-to-bedside” concept. Its specialized hospital design places patient care units in close proximity to research laboratories. This model supports interaction and collaboration among clinical researchers.

The Clinical Center also provides training opportunities for students, new and mid-career professionals. A Summer Internship Program offers internships to students who are currently enrolled in high school, college, graduate programs and health professional schools such as nursing or medicine. The Medical Research Scholars Program is a year-long research enrichment program designed for research-oriented medical, dental and veterinary students. The Clinical Research Management Sabbatical is a self-directed educational experience designed for clinical research investigators and managers of clinical research programs. The Clinical Center also provides a course called the Introduction to the Principles and Practice of Clinical Research to train physicians, scientists, medical students, nurses and other health professionals how to effectively conduct clinical research.

== History ==
The Warren Grant Magnuson Clinical Center opened in 1953 and is 13 floors at its highest point. It is named after Senator Warren Magnuson of Washington.

The Mark O. Hatfield Clinical Research Center, located at the north end of the Clinical Center, opened in 2005. It was named after Senator Mark Hatfield of Oregon.

The hospital has 200 inpatient beds, 11 operating rooms, 93 day hospital stations, critical care services and research labs, an ambulatory care research facility and a complex array of imaging services. The Clinical Center is also one of the few facilities in the world with state-of-the-art infrastructure that allows for isolation capabilities and infection control while patients participate in clinical research studies.

Patients at the Clinical Center consent to participate in research studies, also called protocols, and are treated without charge. Admission is selective: only those patients who have a medical condition being studied by NIH Institutes or Centers and who meet the specific inclusion criteria can enroll in the studies.

In 2014, there were 1,611 clinical research studies underway at the Clinical Center including those focused on cancer, infectious diseases, blood disorders, heart disease, lung disease, alcoholism and drug abuse.

More than 500,000 patients from all 50 states, and from countries around the world, have participated in clinical research at the Clinical Center.

John I. Gallin served as director of the Clinical Center beginning in May 1994. In January 2017, as part of an update to the hospital's leadership structure, NIH director Francis S. Collins named James K. Gilman to the newly created position of chief executive officer Clinical Center. With the arrival of Gilman, Gallin assumed new roles as the NIH Associate Director for Clinical Research and Chief Scientific Officer, Clinical Center.

== Directors ==
Past directors 1948–present

No.	Portrait	Director	Took office	Left office	Refs
1		Jack Masur	1948	1951	
2		John A. Trautman	July 1, 1951	June 24, 1954	
3		Donald W. Patrick	1954	1956	
4		Jack Masur	November 1, 1956	March 8, 1969	
5		Thomas C. Chalmers	February 9, 1970	1973	
6		Robert S. Gordon, Jr.	January 7, 1974	September 1975	
acting		Roger L. Black	September 1975	March 1976	
acting		Griff Ross	April 1976	1976	
7		Mortimer B. Lipsett	1976	1982	
8		John L. Decker	August 1, 1983	May 31, 1990	
acting		Saul Rosen	June 1, 1990	April 30, 1994	
9		John I. Gallin	May 1, 1994	January 8, 2017	
10		James K. Gilman	January 9, 2017	January 31, 2025	
acting		Pius Aiyelawo	March 24, 2025	present	

== Clinical trials ==
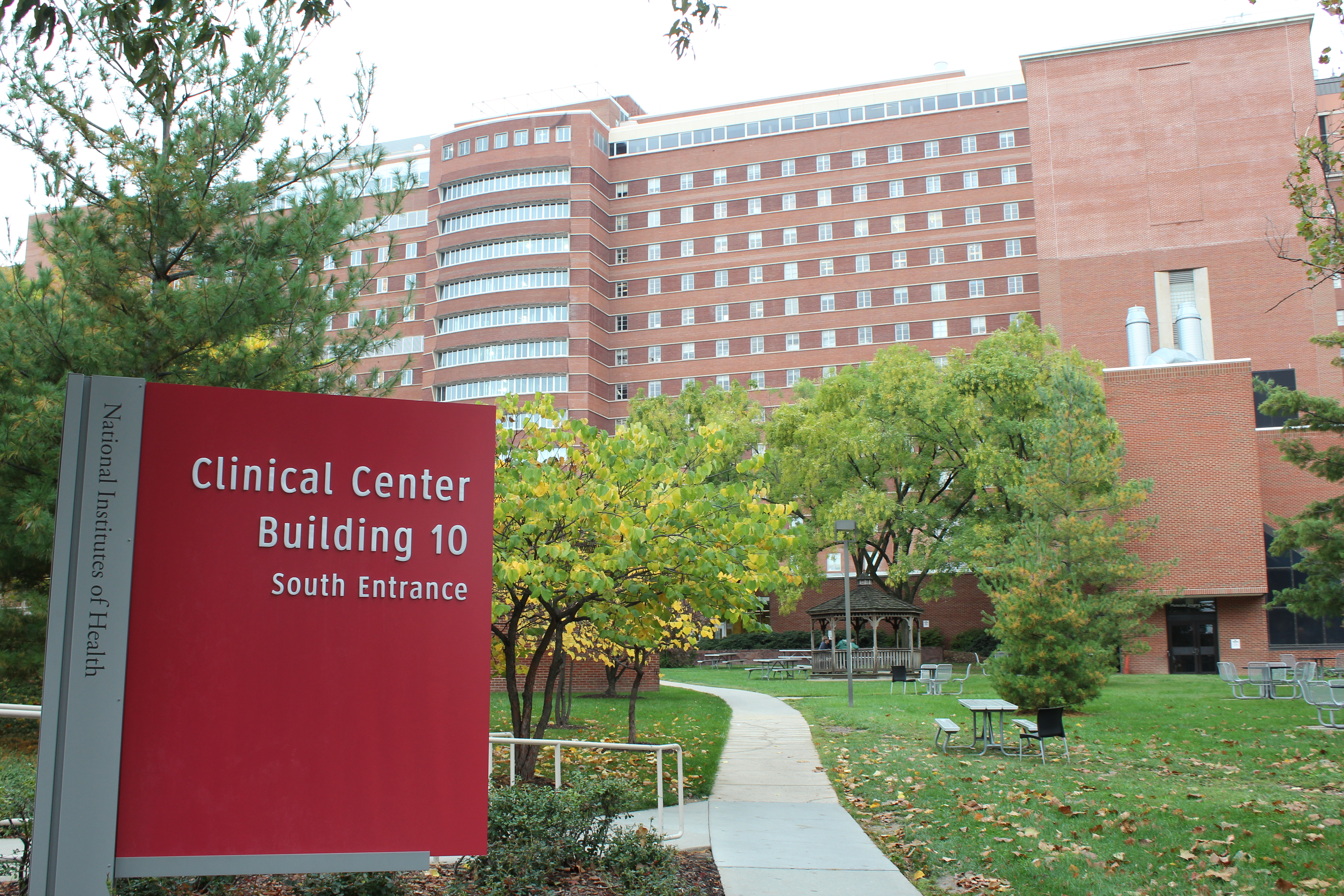
South entrance

In 2014, the NIH Clinical Center had 1,611 active research protocols. 48% of those were clinical trials (773 protocols), another 46% were natural history studies (744 protocols) and the remaining 6% were screening and training protocols.

The Clinical Center provides an environment for both patient care and conducting clinical trials, most of which are in Phase I or Phase II. In 2014, of the 773 active clinical trials protocols, 23% were Phase I trials (261 protocols), 60% were Phase II trials (462 protocols), 5% were Phase III (39 protocols) and 3% were Phase IV (11 protocols).

The Clinical Center also integrates data from all intramural clinical trials in an integrated data repository called Biomedical Translational Research Information System (BTRIS).

== Documentary ==
The Discovery Channel documentary First In Human: The Trials of Building 10, hosted by Jim Parsons, aired in August 2017. The three-episode documentary showed experiences of some staff, patients and caregivers at the NIH Clinical Center.
