= Coleridge and opium =

English poet (1772–1834)

Samuel Taylor Coleridge
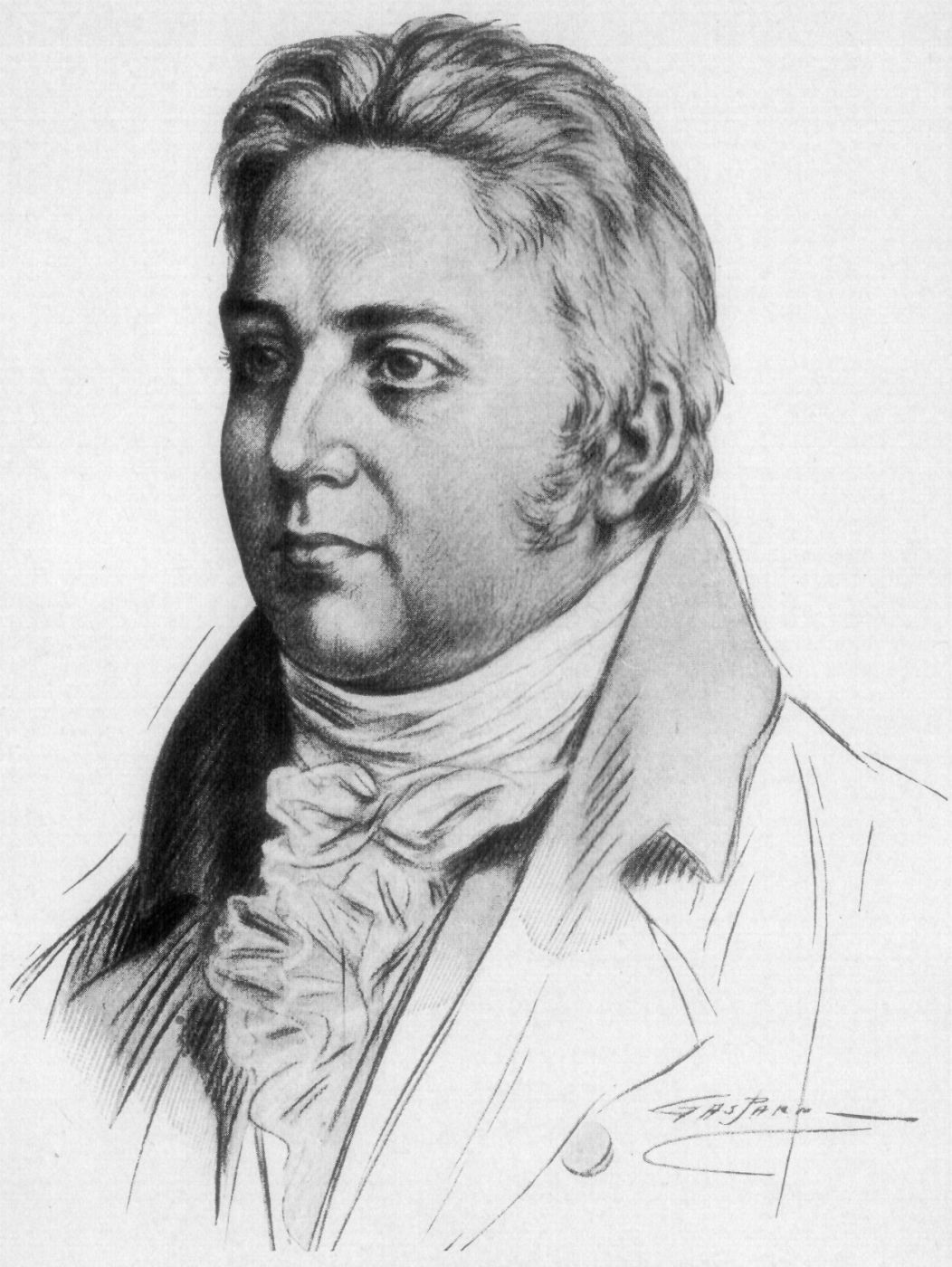
- Born: 21 October 1772; Ottery St. Mary, Devonshire, England
- Died: 25 July 1834 (aged 61); Highgate, England
- Occupations: Poet, critic, philosopher
- Children: Sara Coleridge; Berkeley Coleridge; Derwent Coleridge; Hartley Coleridge
- Writing career
- Movement: Romanticism

Samuel Taylor Coleridge (21 October 1772 – 25 July 1834) was an English poet, critic, and philosopher who consumed opium to address his health issues. His use of opium in his home country of England, as well as Sicily and Malta, is extensively documented. Coleridge's opium use led to severe consequences. Coupled with his health conditions, it harmed his life and adversely impacted his career.

== History ==
Coleridge was a regular user of opium as a relaxant, analgesic, antidepressant, and treatment for numerous health concerns. He wrote Kubla Khan under the drug's influence, but the degree to which he used the drug as a creative enhancement is not precise. Although Coleridge mostly kept his addiction as hidden as possible from those close to him, it became public knowledge with the 1822 publication of Confessions of an English Opium Eater by his close friend Thomas De Quincey. The Confessions painted a rather negative picture of Coleridge, and his reputation suffered accordingly.

Where Coleridge first developed his opium habit is an issue of some scholarly dispute, but it dates from a relatively youthful period in his life. Coleridge’s explanation is clearly laid out in a letter to Joseph Cottle;

I was seduced into the ACCURSED Habit ignorantly – I had been almost bed ridden for many months with swelling in my knees – in a medical journal I happily met with an account of a cure performed in a similar case … by rubbing in of Laudanum, at the same time taking a given dose internally – it acted like a charm, like a miracle! … At length, the unusual stimulus subsided – the complaint returned – the supposed remedy was recurred to – but I cannot go thro’ the dreary history – Suffice to say, that effects were produced, which acted on me by Terror & Cowardice of PAIN and sudden death.

However, most scholars agree that Coleridge had resorted to laudanum (the tincture form of opium), particularly during times of nervousness and stress. Because laudanum was widely available and widely used as an analgesic as well as a general sedative, many people were given the drug for all sorts of medical and nervous complaints. Coleridge was probably given the drug numerous times in his youth during several bouts of rheumatic illness. Small medicinal dosages seldom lead to full-blown addiction. Still, for Coleridge, who experienced the painful return of the symptoms many times in his life, it indeed introduced him to the use of the drug much earlier than his story to Cottle admits. Regardless of when and where Coleridge’s opium addiction began, it is clear that the more reliant on the drug he became, the more his work suffered, the less he was able to focus and concentrate, and the more strained his relations became. In fact, it is arguable that any analysis of Coleridge’s life must be done against the constant background of opium usage. But as necessary as the issue of opium is in Coleridge’s life, it is never a straightforward issue because he often hid it from public and familial view, and at other times he exaggerated its importance to his work. In the 1816 publication of his major ‘opium’ poems, Coleridge purposely drew a connection between his creative work and opium usage. Desperate for some financial success with his poetry, Coleridge intentionally attempted to portray himself as a dreamy opium-eater because he, perhaps rightly, believed that it would draw a morbid fascination to his work. Opium played an exciting role in the public image of Romantic literature. For a long time, there was a kind of cult glamorization of the drug and a morose allure to stories of its usage for respectable members of the bourgeoisie who were thrilled by such taboo subjects. With this in mind, Coleridge generated an image of himself as a dreamy poet who created drug-induced fantasies.

This dreamy image of himself began even before he was widely known to have been addicted to opium. In one of a series of biographical letters written to his friend Thomas Poole, Coleridge painted this picture of himself, which would always endure. Coleridge writes:

So I became a dreamer, and acquired an indisposition to all bodily activity; and I was fretful and inordinately passionate, and as I could not play at anything, and was slothful, I was despised and hated by the boys.

This slothful image was one that endured even with some of Coleridge’s close friends. Coleridge may have consciously created it in the earlier part of his career to draw attention away from his addiction. It was only later that Coleridge perceived advantage to drawing attention not to himself as merely a lazy scholar but a dreamy opium-eater. Coleridge told the most famous story that connects Coleridge's work with his opium usage in his well-known preface to the poem Kubla Khan. Coleridge wrote:

The author continued for about 3 hours in a profound sleep, at least of the external senses, during which time he has the most vivid confidence, that he could not have composed less than from two or three hundred lines … On waking he appeared to himself to have a distinct recollection of the whole and taking up his pen, ink, and paper, instantly and eagerly wrote the lines that are here preserved. At this moment he was unfortunately called out by a person on business from Porlock, and detained by him above an hour, and on his return to his room found, to his no small surprise and mortification, that though he still retained some vague and dim recollection of the general purport of the vision, yet, with the exception of some eight or ten scattered lines and images, all the rest had passed away like the images on the surfaces of a stream into which a stone has been cast, but alas! without the after restoration of the latter!

The sleep of this story is said by Coleridge to be a sleep of opium, and Kubla Khan may be read as an early poetic description of this drug experience. The fact that the poem is generally regarded as one of Coleridge's best is one reason for the continuing interest and debate about the opium's role in his creative output and in Romanticism in general.

Coleridge, in his lucid moments, understood the problems with which he struggled better than most. In an 1814 letter to his friend John Morgan, Coleridge wrote about his difficulties.

In exact proportion, as I loved any person or persons more than others, & would have sacrificed my life to them, were they sure to be the most barbarously mistreated by silence, absence, or breach of promise. What Crime is there scarcely which has not been included in or followed from the one guilt of taking opium? Not to speak of ingratitude to my maker for the wasted Talents; of ingratitude to so many friends who have loved me I know not why; of barbarous neglect of my family … I have in this one dirty business of Laudanum an hundred times deceived, tricked, nay, actually & consciously LIED. – And yet all these vices are so opposite to my nature, that but for the free-agency-annihilating Poison, I verily believe that I should have suffered myself to be cut in pieces rather than have committed any one of them.

In some respects, Coleridge's life bears a resemblance to that of a modern opiate addict. Unfortunately, as much as Coleridge had some grasp of his addictions and their results, as well as an unusually sharp sense of how this addiction might be treated, many of his closest friends and peers did not understand. The people who might have served him best, like Southey and Wordsworth, were far too willing to maintain his image as slothful and selfish, despite the professional help that he constantly bestowed upon them. Men like Robert Southey, naturally conservative in outlook, were not forward-looking enough to comprehend the possibility of Coleridge’s addiction being a mainly physical dependence, despite the fact that Coleridge himself, as well as a growing number of professionals like his friend Gillman, were aware of the physical aspect of drug reliance. On more than one occasion Coleridge pointed out that physical restraint might eventually lead to a cure, and on several occasions under the treatment of Dr. Gillman, he was led thus to the edge of freedom from the drug on which he had formed such a dependence. Southey wrote from the position of moral indignation and explicitly denied the physical aspect of the drug issue. Southey wrote to Cottle:

“…while acknowledging the guilt of the habit, he impute it still to morbid bodily causes, whereas … every person who has witnessed his habits, knows that for … infinitely the greater part – inclination and indulgence are the motives. It seems dreadful to say this … but it is so and I know it to be so, from my own observation and that of all with whom he has lived … This, Cottle, is an insanity of that species which none but the Soul’s physician can cure.”.

== Coleridge in Highgate ==
In April 1816, Coleridge's friend and physician, Joseph Adams, put him in touch with a Highgate doctor named James Gillman, intending to place Coleridge in his full-time care and effect a cure of his addiction problems. Although Gillman initially had no intention of taking this stranger into his household, he was so charmed by the poet on their first meeting that he agreed to take him in and attempt a cure. Coleridge spent most of the rest of his life in the Gillman house with only brief periods away. James Gillman was ahead of his time as a physician of addiction. Although he could never stop Coleridge's intake of opium entirely, he managed to bring it under greater control for many years. It is undoubtedly to Gillman’s treatment and friendship that we owe much of Coleridge’s later prose works, particularly his Biographia Literaria, Lay Sermons, and Opus Maximum.

Coleridge virtually became a member of the Gillman family and even accompanied them on annual vacations. On several occasions when Coleridge was away from the Gillman household, he fell back into excessive opium use. Each time Gillman managed to step in and return Coleridge to his home and controlled less harmful opium dosages. The pharmacy where the poet obtained his prescribed supply (and sometimes, an illicit addition to it) still exists in the High Street, though moved a few dozen yards from the original premises. Gillman later became one of Coleridge’s great champions, commonly defending the reputation of his friend in polite society and print with one of Coleridge's earliest biographies. Coleridge’s reputation was somewhat restored during his years at Highgate. In his lucid periods, he became a kind of elder statesman of the literary establishment and was visited by many of the period’s most influential writers and thinkers. Despite Gillman’s care, however, Coleridge was overcome with respiratory problems and enlargement of the heart. Coleridge died at the age of 61.

== Bibliography ==
- Poetical Works of Samuel Taylor Coleridge, George Bell & Sons, London, 1885.
- Collected Letters in 6 volumes, ed. E. L. Griggs, Clarendon Press: Oxford (1956–1971)
- Samuel Taylor Coleridge: A Bondage of Opium, Stein and Day: New York: 1974 ISBN 0-8128-1711-7
- Biography by Richard Holmes: Coleridge: Early Visions, Viking Penguin: New York, 1990 (republished later by HarperCollins) ISBN 0-375-70540-6; Coleridge: Darker Reflections, HarperCollins: London, 1997 ISBN 0-375-70838-3
