= James Franklin Gilman =

Itinerant painter

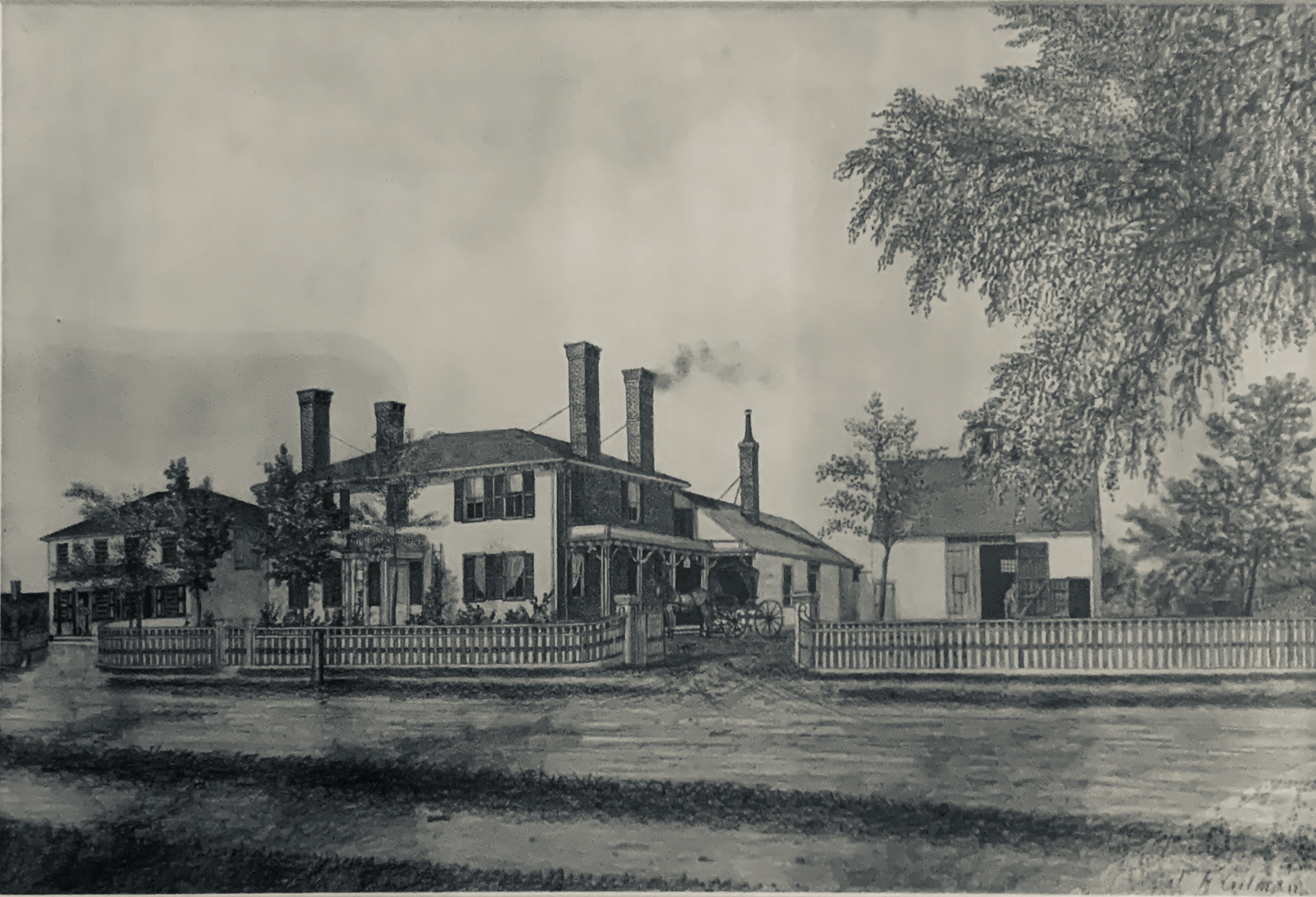
Drawing by James Franklin Gilman of the Elijah Stearns Mansion in Bedford Center Historic District, Bedford, Massachusetts.

James Franklin Gilman (c. 1850–1929) was an itinerant painter known for his New England landscapes. Much of his life was spent living in and painting towns in Vermont and Massachusetts. His work particularly focuses on farms and New England life during the late 19th and early 20th centuries. His work has been sold at auction many times over the years.

== Biography ==
Born in about 1850, Gilman lived in Woburn, Massachusetts as a child. He sold his first painting in his early 20s and became a self-taught, traveling painter, mostly using his skills to trade for room and board. His artistic mediums included charcoal, crayon, oil, pastel, and watercolor. He continued painting and drawing into his later years, up until his death in 1929.

He taught students in penciling, watercolors, and oil painting at Goddard Seminary in Barre, Vermont and published an instructional pamphlet entitled “Instructions in Pictorial Art for Home Study.”

In addition to his work as painter of landscapes and rural life, he had a role as an illustrator of a religious book. In 1892 he met Mary Baker Eddy, the founder of The First Church of Christ, Scientist. The following year she invited him to illustrate her poem "Christ and Christmas".

According to Kelly Byquist in 2020, "Though not a household name, James Franklin Gilman’s artwork is still cherished and collected, and numerous exhibitions of his work have been held in New England over the past 50 years." The Athol Historical Society holds an exhibition of his work roughly every five years since the 1970s.
