= John I. Gallin =

American medical researcher

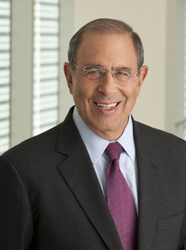
- Gallin at the NIH Clinical Center
- Born: March 25, 1943 (age 83); New York City, New York
- Died: October 10, 2024 (aged 81)
- Education: Amherst College, BA, cum laude (1965); Cornell Medical College of Cornell University, MD, 1969
- Known for: Scientific contributions clarifying the basis of, and developing new treatments for, disorders of innate immunity (inflammation)
- Scientific career
- Fields: Infectious Diseases Inflammation/Immunology
- Workplaces: National Institutes of Health, National Institute of Allergy and Infectious Diseases, NIH Clinical Center
- Uniformed service
- Allegiance: United States
- Service: U.S. Public Health Service Commissioned Corps
- Rank: Rear Admiral

John Isaac Gallin (March 25, 1943 - October 10, 2024) was an American medical researcher who contributed to the understanding of innate immunity but especially chronic granulomatous disease, a phagocyte disorder.

Gallin was appointed director of the NIH Clinical Center on May 1, 1994, and served until January 8, 2017. He also served as the chief scientific officer for the Clinical Center and associate director for clinical research at the National Institutes of Health.

== Education and career ==
Gallin was born on March 25, 1943, in New York City, His father was an attorney, and his mother was trained as a social worker, but then became a stay-at-home mom. He graduated from New Rochelle High School in New Rochelle, NY, in 1961. He graduated cum laude from Amherst College in 1965. He earned his M.D. from Cornell Medical College of Cornell University in 1969.

After a medical internship and residency at New York University’s Bellevue Hospital, in 1971 he began postdoctoral training in basic and clinical research in infectious diseases at the National Institutes of Health as a clinical associate in the Laboratory of Clinical Investigation, National Institute of Allergy and Infectious Diseases. Gallin returned to New York University's Bellevue Hospital as senior chief medical resident from 1974 to 1975, then came back to NIH.

In 1985, he was appointed scientific director for intramural research activities at the NIAID, a position he held for the next nine years. Gallin was the founding chief of NIAID's Laboratory of Host Defenses in 1991 and served as chief of the laboratory for 12 years. He continued as chief of the lab's clinical pathophysiology section in a new version of the lab called the Laboratory of Clinical Immunology and Microbiology.

Gallin was the 10th director of the NIH Clinical Center, a position he held for 22 years, the longest serving director. The Clinical Center is the largest hospital focused solely on clinical research and serves the scientific and medical needs of 17 NIH institutes. In 2011, under Gallin's leadership, the Clinical Center was the only hospital to receive the Lasker-Bloomberg Public Service Award.

In August 2016, Gallin was appointed to the newly created positions of NIH associate director for clinical research and chief scientific officer for the Clinical Center. These posts reported directly to the NIH Director and oversaw independent research programs, clinical research training and the scientific review process for all clinical protocols conducted at the NIH. On January 8, 2017, Gallin stepped down as the director of the NIH Clinical Center to focus full-time as the chief scientific officer of the Clinical Center and NIH associate director for clinical research.

Gallin served as Assistant Surgeon General of the United States Public Health Service and retired from the USPHS as a rear admiral.

Gallin published or co-authored more than 355 articles in scientific journals and edited two textbooks: Inflammation, Basic Principles and Clinical Correlates (Lippincott, Williams, and Wilkins, 1999) and Principles and Practices of Clinical Research (Academic Press, 2002, 4th edition (2018).

== Medical research ==
Gallin's primary research interests were on the role of phagocytes, the body's scavenger cells in host defense. His research focused on rare hereditary immune disorders, and he identified the genetic basis of several diseases of the phagocytes (neutrophils and macrophages).

The laboratory focused on neutrophil-specific granule deficiency, actin interacting protein deficiency and chronic granulomatous disease (CGD). When phagocytes fail to produce hydrogen peroxide and bleach, CGD results. The laboratory described the genetic basis for several forms of CGD and the research has reduced life-threatening bacterial and fungal infections in CGD patients. The laboratory discovered that when CGD patients get older they are protected from atherosclerosis (narrowing of the arteries), suggesting the abnormal enzyme in this disease might be a drugable target for normal people with disorders of inflammation such as atherosclerosis.

== Achievements as NIH Clinical Center Director ==
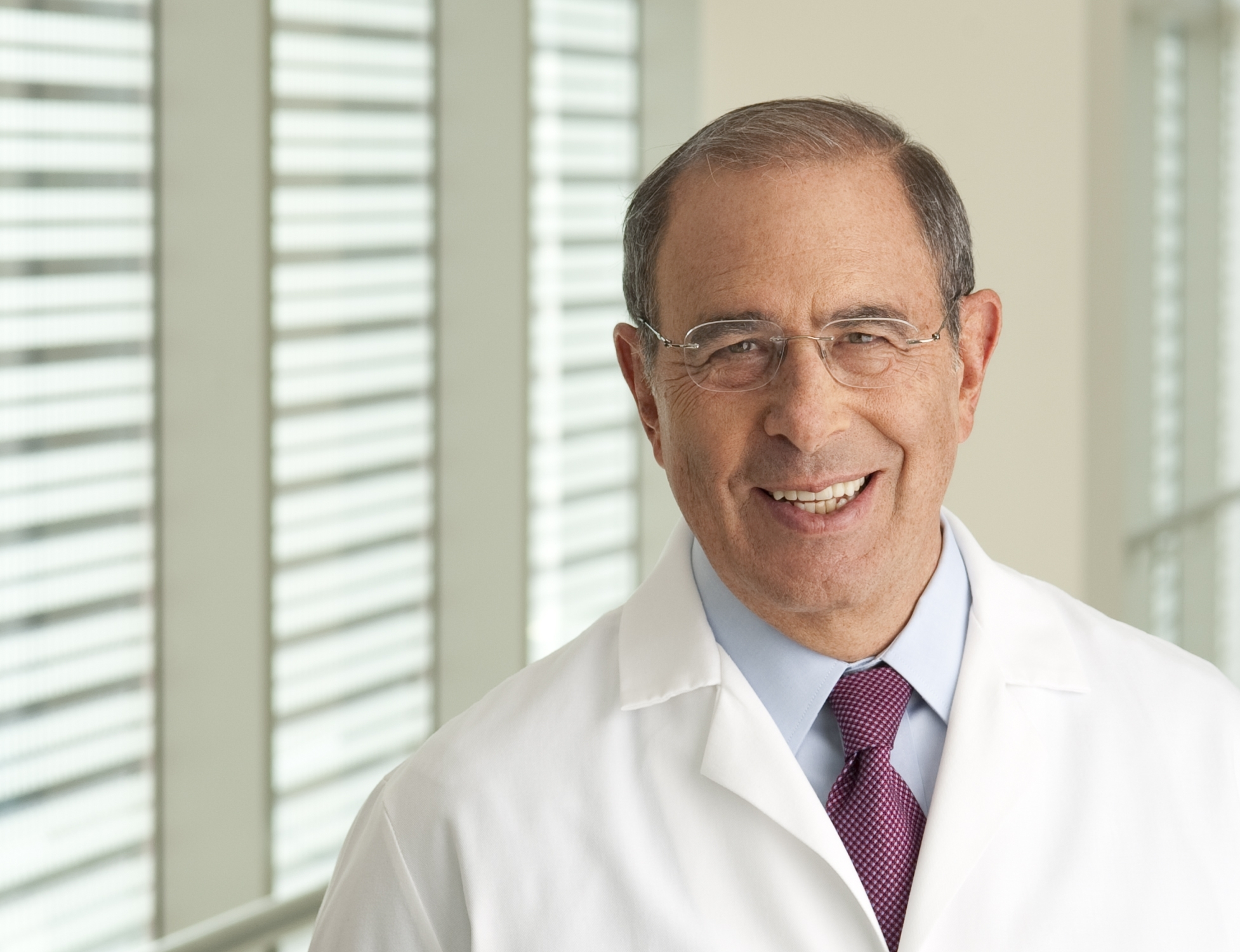
Dr. Gallin in 2011

During his tenure as director of the NIH Clinical Center, Gallin oversaw the design and construction of the Mark O. Hatfield Clinical Research Center (CRC), an 870,000-square-foot research hospital added to the original structure. The CRC opened to patients in 2005.

Gallin also established a new curriculum for clinical research training that is now offered globally reaching over 20,000 students annually throughout the United States and in over 150 countries, and he supported development of new information systems for sharing biomedical translational and clinical research.

Gallin was key to establishing a Patient Advisory Group at the Clinical Center in 1998, one of the first for patients participating in clinical research. He, along with Clinical Center nurses, conceived and championed identifying resources from the NIH Foundation to construct the NIH Edmond J. Safra Family Lodge which opened in 2005.

Gallin stressed the importance of collaboration and helped open the Clinical Center and its depth of resources to the research community outside NIH.

== Memberships ==
Gallin was a member of the National Academy of Medicine (formerly the Institute of Medicine) of the National Academy of Sciences, the Association of American Physicians, the American Society for Clinical Investigation, and the American College of Physicians (Master). He was an elected member of the Royal College of Physicians-London.

== Awards and honors ==
- 2022 Weill Cornell Medical College Alumni Award of Distinction
- 2021 Elected Member of the Royal College of Physicians-London
- 2016 Abby Rare Voice award
- 2006 American College of Physicians Richard and Hinda Rosenthal Foundation Award
- 2006 Department of Health & Human Services Secretary's Award for Distinguished Service
- 2002 Society for Leukocyte Biology Marie T. Bonazinga Lifetime Achievement Award
- 1996 NIH G. Burroughs Mider Lectureship
- 1990 Jeffrey Modell Foundation Lifetime Achievement Award
- 1988 Honorary Doctor of Science, Amherst College
- 1987 Infectious Diseases Society of America Squibb Award
- 1984 American Federation for Clinical Research Award for Clinical Research
- 1969 Dean William Mecklenburg Polk Memorial Prize in Research, (Cornell Medical College)
- 1969 Anthony Seth Werner Memorial Prize in Infectious Diseases (Cornell Medical College)

== USPHS awards ==
- 2001 Physician Executive of the Year
- 1993 Surgeon General's Exemplary Service Medal
- 1992 Distinguished Service Medal
- 1991 Award for Orphan Product Development
- 1988 Meritorious Service Medal
- 1985 Outstanding Service Medal
- 1980 Commendation Medal

== Personal life ==
In 1966, Gallin married Elaine Klimerman Gallin, a scientist with whom he collaborated. They had two children: Alice Jennifer Gallin-Dwyer, trained as a lawyer and now working as the deputy director at the Washington Monthly and raising three children, and Michael Louis Gallin, an architect practicing outside New York City who has two children.

== Selected publications ==
Books

- Gallin, J. I., Ognibene, F.P., Johnson, L.L. "Principles and Practice of Clinical Research, 4th ed." New York, Academic Press 2018. ISBN 978-0-12-382167-6
- Gallin, J. I., Snyderman, R., Haynes B F., Nathan C., Fearon D.T. "Inflammation: Basic Principles and Clinical Correlates, 3rd Ed." New York, Lippincott, Williams and Wilkins. 1999. ISBN 978-1-40-203797-9
- Metcalf, J. A., Gallin, J. I., Nauseef, W. M. and Root, R. K. "Laboratory Manual of Neutrophil Function." New York, Raven Press, Ltd. 1986. ISBN 978-0-12-849905-4
- Gallin, J. I. and Quie, P. G. "Leukocyte Chemotaxis: Methods, Physiology and Clinical Implications." New York, Raven Press, Ltd. 1978. ISBN 978-0-89-004198-7

Journal articles

- Gallin JI (Oct 2011). "Commentary: The NIH Clinical Center and the Future of Clinical Research". Nature Medicine. 17 (10): 1221–1223. doi:10.1038/nm.2466. PMID 21989014.
- Gallin JI, Alling DW, Malech HL, others (Jun 2003). "Itraconazole to Prevent Fungal Infections in Chronic Granulomatous Disease". The New England Journal of Medicine. 348 (24): 2416–2422. doi:10.1056/NEJMoa021931. PMID 12802027.
- Lekstrom-Himes JA, Gallin JI (Dec 2000). "Immunodeficiency diseases caused by defects in phagocytes". The New England Journal of Medicine. 343 (23): 1703–1714. doi:10.1056/NEJM200012073432307. PMID 11106721.
- Holland SM, Eisenstein EM, Kuhns DB, Turner ML, Fleisher TA, Strober W, Gallin JI (May 1994). "Treatment of refractory disseminated non-tuberculosis mycobacterial infection with interferon-gamma: A preliminary report". The New England Journal of Medicine. 330 (19): 1348–1355. doi:10.1056/NEJM199405123301904. PMID 7908719.
- Gallin JI, Malech HL, Melnick DA, et al. (Feb 1991). "A controlled trial of interferon-gamma to prevent infection in chronic granulomatous disease. The international chronic granulomatous disease cooperative study group". The New England Journal of Medicine. 324 (8): 509–516. doi:10.1056/NEJM199102213240801. PMID 1846940.
- Leto TL, Lomax KJ, Volpp BD, Nunoi H, Sechler JM, Nauseef WM, Clark RA, Gallin JI, Malech HL (May 1990). "Cloning of a 67K neutrophil oxidase factor with similarity to a noncatalytic region of p60c-src". Science. 248 (4956): 727–730. Bibcode:1990Sci...248..727L. doi:10.1126/science.1692159. PMID 1692159.
- Lomax KJ, Leto TL, Nunoi H, Gallin JI, Malech HL (Jul 1989). "Recombinant 47-kD cytosol factor restores NADPH oxidase in chronic granulomatous disease". Science. 245 (4916): 409–412. doi:10.1126/science.2547247. PMID 2547247.
- Nunoi H, Rotrosen D, Gallin JI, Malech HL (Dec 1988). "Two forms of autosomal chronic granulomatous disease lack distinct neutrophil cytosol factors". Science. 242 (4883): 1298–1301. Bibcode:1988Sci...242.1298N. doi:10.1126/science.2848319. JSTOR 1702551. PMID 2848319.
- Malech HL, Root RK, Gallin JI (Dec 1977). "Structural analysis of human neutrophil migration: Centriole, microtubule and microfilament orientation and function during chemotaxis". Journal of Cell Biology. 75 (3): 666–693. doi:10.1083/jcb.75.3.666. PMC 2111577. PMID 562885.
- Gallin EK, Gallin JI (Oct 1977). "Interaction of chemotactic factors with human macrophages: Induction of transmembrane potential changes". Journal of Cell Biology. 75 (1): 277–289. doi:10.1083/jcb.75.1.277. PMC 2111555. PMID 410816.
