= Anthony Fauci =

American immunologist (born 1940)

Anthony Fauci ForMemRS
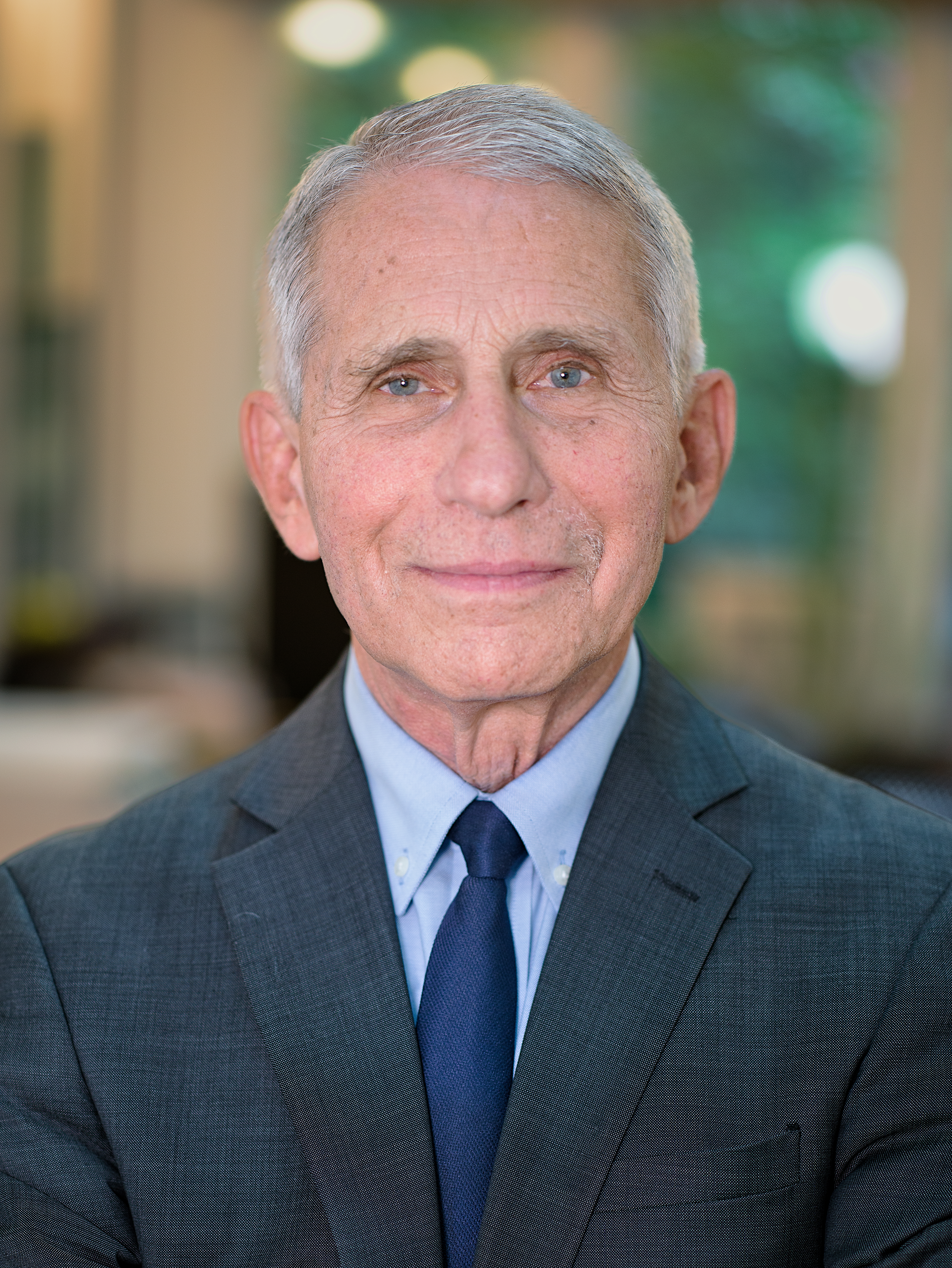
- Fauci in 2023

2nd Chief Medical Advisor to the President
- In office January 20, 2021 – December 31, 2022
- President: Joe Biden
- Preceded by: Ronny Jackson
- Succeeded by: Vacant

5th Director of the National Institute of Allergy and Infectious Diseases
- In office November 2, 1984 – December 31, 2022
- Deputy: James Hill; John La Montagne; Hugh Auchincloss
- Preceded by: Richard M. Krause
- Succeeded by: Jeanne Marrazzo

Personal details
- Born: December 24, 1940 (age 85) New York City, U.S.
- Spouse: Christine Grady (m. 1985)
- Children: 3
- Education: College of the Holy Cross (BA); Cornell University (MD)
- Awards: National Medal of Science (2005); Presidential Medal of Freedom (2008); Robert Koch Medal (2013); Dan David Prize (2021)
- Scientific career
- Fields: Immunology
- Workplaces: National Institutes of Health; Georgetown University
- Notable students: Drew Weissman
- Uniformed service
- Branch: U.S. Public Health Service Commissioned Corps
- Service years: 1969–1996
- Rank: Rear Admiral
- Anthony Fauci's voice Fauci on the Omicron variant Recorded November 2021

Anthony Stephen Fauci (Note: Pronounced /ˈfaʊtʃi/ FOW-chee) (born December 24, 1940) is an American physician and immunologist who served as the fifth director of the National Institute of Allergy and Infectious Diseases (NIAID) from 1984 to 2022, and as the second chief medical advisor to President Joe Biden from 2021 to 2022, during the COVID-19 pandemic. He was one of the most cited scientists across all scientific journals from 1983 to 2002.

Fauci graduated from the College of the Holy Cross, where he studied classics, and earned his Doctor of Medicine from Cornell University. As a physician at the National Institutes of Health (NIH), Fauci served in the American public health sector for more than fifty years and has acted as an advisor to every U.S. president since Ronald Reagan. During his time as NIAID director, he was known for his contributions to HIV/AIDS research and other immunodeficiency diseases. He was awarded the National Medal of Science in 2005 for pioneering HIV pathogenesis research and was awarded the Presidential Medal of Freedom in 2008 for his work on PEPFAR, an AIDS relief program, by President George W. Bush.

During the COVID-19 pandemic, Fauci served under President Donald Trump as one of the lead members of the White House Coronavirus Task Force. His advice was frequently contradicted by Trump, and Trump's supporters alleged that Fauci was trying to politically undermine Trump's run for re-election in 2020. Under the Biden administration, Fauci served as one of the lead members of the White House COVID-19 Response Team and as Biden's chief medical advisor, during which time his advice was generally supported. On Biden's last full day in office, Fauci was issued a preemptive pardon covering potential federal offenses between January 1, 2014, and January 19, 2025.

== Early life and education ==
Fauci was born on December 24, 1940, in Brooklyn Hospital in Downtown Brooklyn, New York City. His father, Stephen, was a pharmacist who graduated from Columbia University and owned a pharmacy in Dyker Heights. His mother, Eugenia Abys, worked at a dry cleaner. On his father's side, Fauci was descended from immigrants from Sciacca, Sicily. His maternal grandparents were from Naples, Italy. His maternal grandmother, Raffaella Trematerra, was a seamstress, and his maternal grandfather, Giovanni Abys, was a Swiss-born landscape and portrait artist noted for his magazine illustrations in Italy.

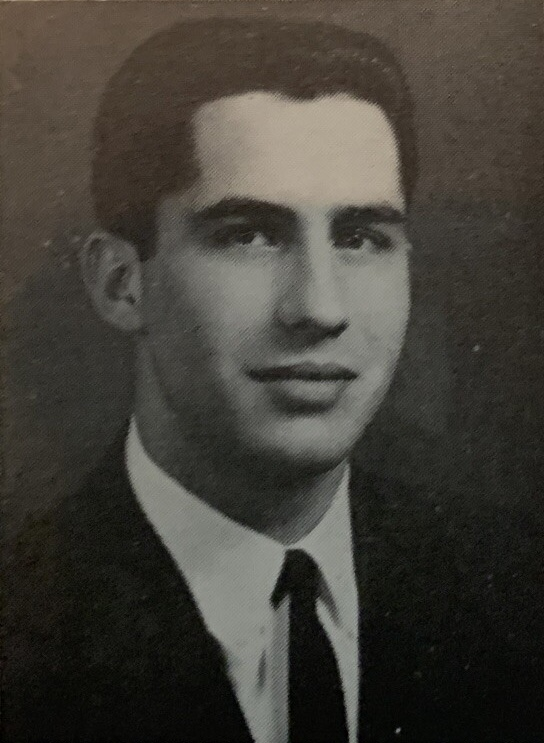
Fauci as a senior at the College of the Holy Cross, 1966

As a child, Fauci, together with his mother and older sister, worked at the register of his father's pharmacy. The pharmacy was directly beneath the family apartment, which had previously been in the Bensonhurst neighborhood. In his youth, Fauci developed a fascination with World War II. He was raised Catholic. He attended Regis High School, a competitive Jesuit school in Manhattan's Upper East Side, where he captained the school's basketball team despite standing only 5 ft 7 in (1.70 m) tall. He decided mid-way through high school to become a physician, graduating in 1958.

After high school, Fauci enrolled at the College of the Holy Cross, which he recalled as having "an extraordinary reputation for premedical work". He studied classical Greek there and worked in a construction gang during the summers. As an undergraduate at Holy Cross, his courses focused on philosophy, French, Greek, and Latin. He graduated from Holy Cross in 1962 with a Bachelor of Arts, cum laude, in classics and pre-med studies, then attended medical school at Cornell University, where he graduated first in his class with a Doctor of Medicine (M.D.) from the Cornell Medical College in 1966. At Cornell, he focused on adult internal medicine, mainly infectious diseases and the immune system. Fauci then did an internship and residency in internal medicine at New York Hospital-Cornell Medical Center (now Weill Cornell Medical Center).

== Career ==
After completing his medical residency in 1968, Fauci joined the National Institutes of Health (NIH) as a clinical associate in the National Institute of Allergy and Infectious Diseases's (NIAID) Laboratory of Clinical Investigation (LCI). He became head of the LCI's Clinical Physiology Section in 1974, and in 1980 was appointed chief of the NIAID's Laboratory of Immunoregulation. He became director of the NIAID in 1984. Fauci has been offered the position of director of the NIH several times, but has declined each time.

Fauci has been at the forefront of U.S. efforts to contend with viral diseases like HIV/AIDS, SARS, the Swine flu, MERS, Ebola, and COVID-19. He played a significant role in the early 2000s in creating the President's Emergency Plan for AIDS Relief (PEPFAR) and in driving development of biodefense drugs and vaccines following the 9/11 terrorist attacks. Fauci has been a visiting professor at many medical centers and has received numerous honorary doctorates from universities in the U.S. and abroad.

=== Medical achievements ===
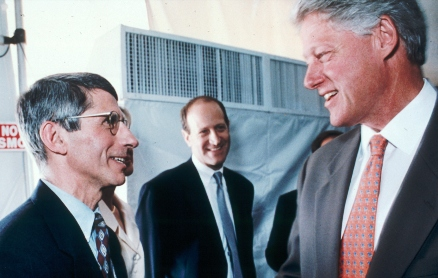
President Bill Clinton hearing about the latest advances in HIV/AIDS research from Fauci in 1995

Fauci has made important scientific observations that contributed to the understanding of the regulation of the human immune response and is recognized for delineating the mechanisms whereby immunosuppressive agents adapt to that response. He developed therapies for formerly fatal diseases such as polyarteritis nodosa, granulomatosis with polyangiitis, and lymphomatoid granulomatosis. In a 1985 Stanford University Arthritis Center Survey, members of the American Rheumatism Association ranked Fauci's work on the treatment of polyarteritis nodosa and granulomatosis with polyangiitis as one of the most important advances in patient management in rheumatology over the previous 20 years. Fauci discovered how to re-dose cancer drugs in a way that turned a 98 percent mortality rate of the disorder vasculitis into a 93 percent remission rate.

Fauci has contributed to the understanding of how HIV destroys the body's natural defense system, progressing to AIDS. He has outlined the mechanisms of induction of HIV expression by endogenous cytokines. Fauci has worked to develop strategies for the therapy and immune reconstitution of patients with the disease, as well as for a vaccine to prevent HIV infection. His current research is concentrated on identifying the nature of the immunopathogenic mechanisms of HIV infection and the scope of the body's immune responses to HIV. In 2003, the Institute for Scientific Information stated that from 1983 to 2002, "Fauci was the 13th most-cited scientist among the 2.5 to 3.0 million authors in all disciplines throughout the world who published articles in scientific journals." As a government scientist under seven presidents, Fauci has been described as "a consistent spokesperson for science, a person who more than any other figure has brokered a generational peace" between the two worlds of science and politics.

=== HIV/AIDS epidemic ===
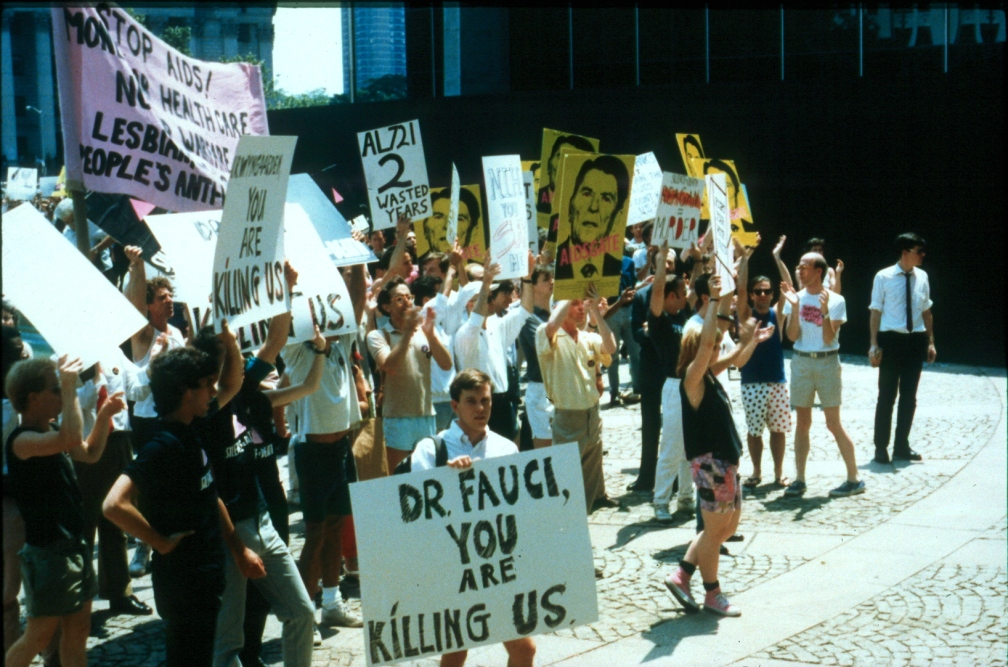
In 1990, ACT-UP protested Fauci's role in Ronald Reagan's AIDS policy at the National Institutes of Health

In a 2020 interview with The Guardian, Fauci remarked, "My career and my identity has really been defined by HIV." He was one of the leading researchers during the AIDS epidemic in the early 1980s. In 1981, he and his team of researchers began looking for a vaccine or treatment for this novel virus, though they met a number of obstacles. In October 1988, protesters came to the National Institute of Allergy and Infectious Diseases. Fauci, who had become the institute's director in 1984, bore the brunt of the anger from the LGBTQ+ community who were largely ignored by the government.

Leading AIDS activist Larry Kramer attacked Fauci relentlessly in the media. He called him an "incompetent idiot" and a "pill-pushing" tool of the medical establishment. Fauci did not have control over drug approval though many people felt he was not doing enough. Fauci did make an effort in the late 1980s to reach out to the LGBTQ+ community in New York and San Francisco to find ways he and the NIAID could find a solution. Fauci was also praised for engaging with AIDS advocates, and he helped to make experimental AIDS treatments more accessible. Though Fauci was initially admonished for his treatment of the AIDS epidemic, his work in the community was eventually acknowledged. Kramer, who had spent years hating Fauci for his treatment of the HIV/AIDS epidemic, eventually called him "the only true and great hero" among government officials during the AIDS crisis.

Fauci was criticized over what some said was a delayed response from the U.S. government to the HIV/AIDS epidemic, including delays in the promotion of experimental HIV/AIDS drugs. In 2014, Sean Strub of HuffPost criticized Fauci for "delaying promotion of an AIDS treatment that would have prevented tens of thousands of deaths in the first years of the epidemic" and accused him of "rewriting history". Political commentator Helen Andrews defended Fauci's actions during the epidemic in a 2021 article, writing:

The idea that Fauci was "wrong" about A.I.D.S., which some of his contemporary opponents repeat, is unfair. His most notorious error was a 1983 paper suggesting "routine close contact, as within a family household," might spread the disease, but it was an understandable mistake given what was known at the time and he corrected it within a year, lightning speed by the standards of academic publishing. He behaved more responsibly than some of his peers when it came to speculating about a heterosexual A.I.D.S. epidemic around the corner. He was not one of the hysteria-mongers—though he did benefit from the hysteria when negotiating budgets with Congress.

Fauci was the main architect of President's Emergency Plan for AIDS Relief (PEPFAR), an HIV/AIDS program responsible for saving over 20 million lives in the developing world.

=== 2009 swine flu pandemic ===
In a meeting with reporters on September 17, 2009, Fauci predicted that the H1N1 virus causing the 2009 swine flu pandemic could infect as many as one in three Americans, more than the amount of Americans usually infected by the seasonal flu.

=== Ebola congressional hearing ===
On October 16, 2014, in a United States congressional hearing regarding the Ebola virus crisis, Fauci, who, as the director of the National Institute of Allergy and Infectious Diseases (NIAID) had been discussing the importance of screening for weeks, testified that NIAID was still some distance away from producing sufficient quantities of cures or vaccines for widespread trials. Specifically, Fauci said, "While NIAID is an active participant in the global effort to address the public health emergency occurring in west Africa, it is important to recognize that we are still in the early stages of understanding how infection with the Ebola virus can be treated and prevented." Fauci also remarked in the hearing: "As we continue to expedite research while enforcing high safety and efficacy standards, the implementation of the public health measures already known to contain prior Ebola virus outbreaks and the implementation of treatment strategies such as fluid and electrolyte replacement is essential to preventing additional infections, treating those already infected, protecting healthcare providers, and ultimately bringing this epidemic to an end."

=== COVID-19 pandemic ===
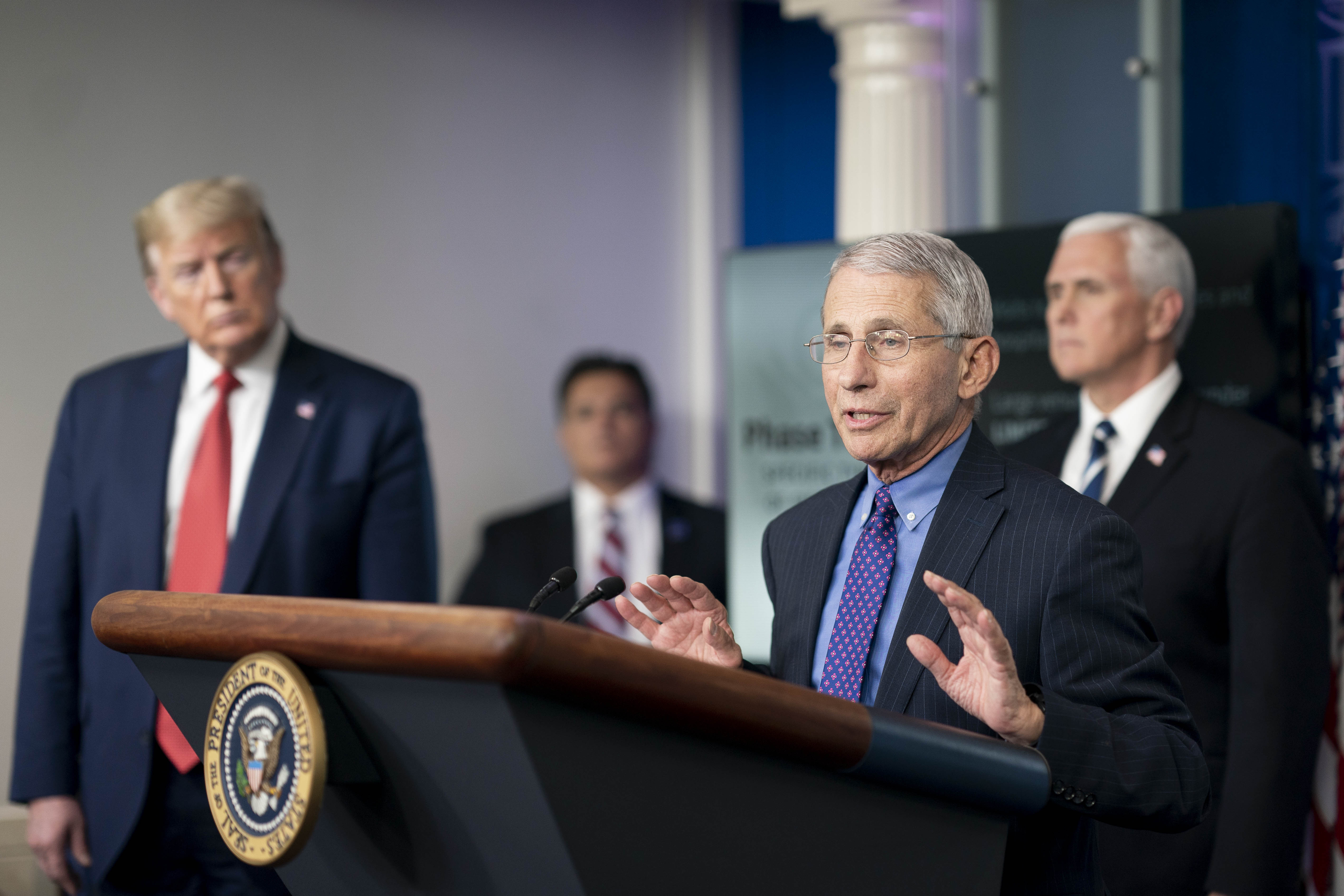
Fauci speaks to the White House press corps on COVID-19 in April 2020, watched by President Donald Trump (left) and Vice President Mike Pence (right).

According to The Washington Post, before the COVID-19 pandemic, Fauci was "mostly unknown outside the medical community". Fauci did not meet with Trump until three years after he was inaugurated as president. Fauci was a member of the White House Coronavirus Task Force established in late January 2020, under President Donald Trump, to deal with the COVID-19 pandemic. He was described as the administration's public health spokesperson during the pandemic, and a strong advocate for ongoing social distancing efforts in the United States. In interviews on January 21, January 26, and February 17, Fauci commented on COVID-19. He said that at the time of the interviews ("right now"), COVID-19 was not a "major threat" to the American public, with the risk to the American public being "low", but that it was "an evolving situation", and that "public health officials need to take [COVID-19] very seriously". In the latter interview, Fauci said that COVID-19 could become a "global pandemic which would then have significant implications for" the United States. In March 2020, he predicted that the infection fatality rate would likely be close to 1%, which was ten times more severe than the 0.1% reported rate for seasonal flu.

In a March 8, 2020, interview, Fauci stated that "right now in the United States, people [who are not infected] should not be walking around with masks", but "if you want to do it, that's fine". In the same interview, Fauci said that buying masks "could lead to a shortage of masks for the people who really need" them: "When you think masks, you should think of healthcare providers needing them". When Fauci made this comment, America's top surgical mask maker was struggling to produce enough masks to meet the increased demand. On April 3, the CDC reversed course, quoting recent studies that showed asymptomatic transmission of the virus, thus advocating for the public to wear non-surgical masks to reduce community transmission while Fauci advocated for wearing facial coverings in public. Fauci's shifting advice on wearing face masks drew criticism, which Fauci responded to by arguing that changes in policy were necessary as scientists learned more about COVID-19.

In mid-April, when asked about social distancing and stay-at-home measures, Fauci said that if the administration had "started mitigation earlier" more lives could have been saved, and "no one is going to deny that." He added that the decision-making for implementing mitigation measures was "complicated", and that "there was a lot of pushback about shutting things down back then." Fauci's comments were met with a hostile response from former Republican congressional candidate DeAnna Lorraine. Trump retweeted Lorraine's response, which included the call to "#FireFauci". "Fire Fauci" has also been chanted by anti-lockdown protesters in various locations, including Florida and Texas. As a result, the White House denied that Trump was firing Fauci, and blamed the media for overreacting.

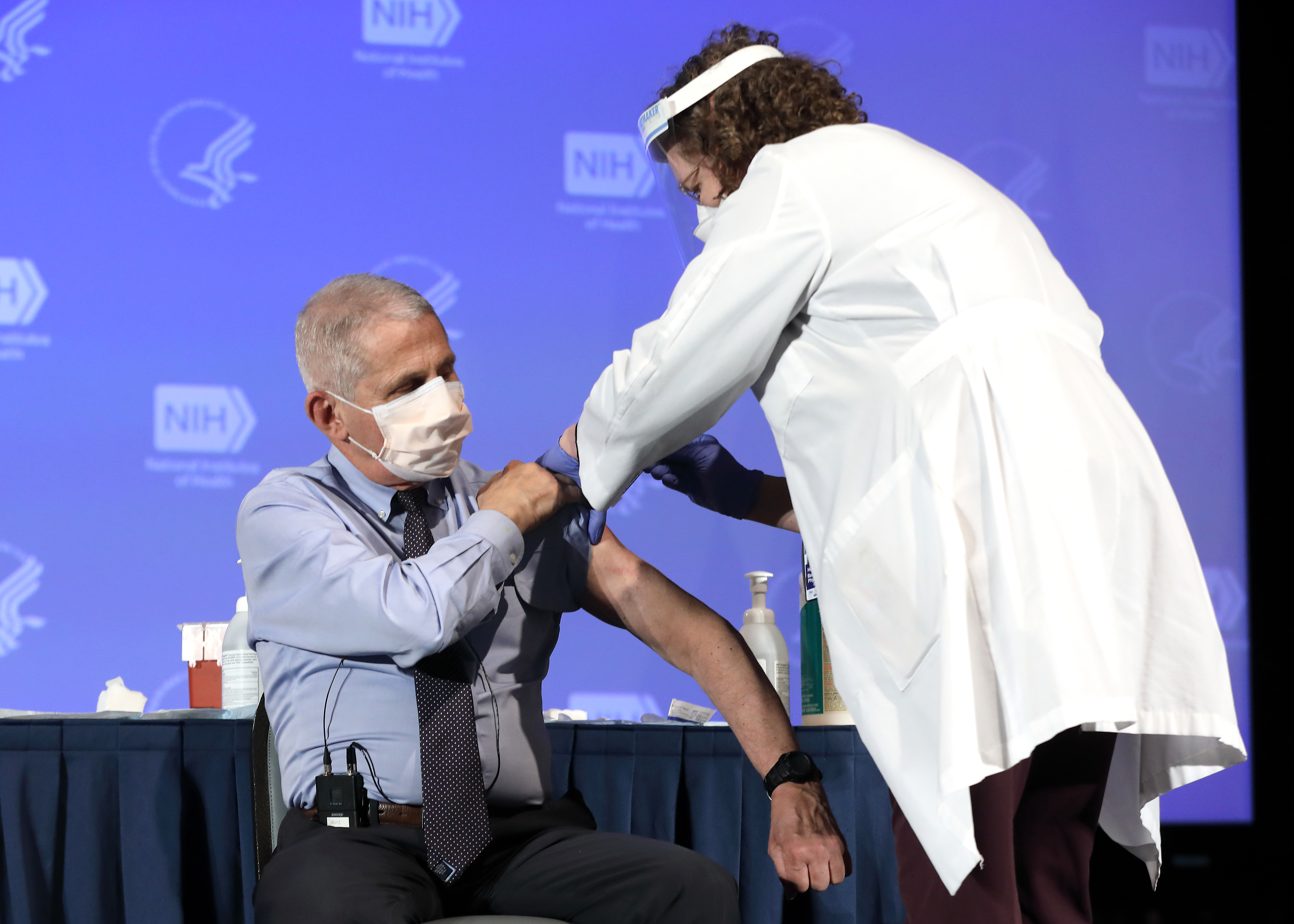
Fauci receives his first dose of the Moderna COVID-19 vaccine, in December 2020, at a NIH vaccination event.

Fauci was criticized by right-wing pundits and received death threats that necessitated a security detail. In an interview with 60 Minutes in 2020, he mentioned that other members of his family, including his wife and daughters, had been repeatedly harassed since the pandemic began. In June 2020, Fauci said that he was "very concerned" that the ongoing protests against police brutality would cause "surges" in COVID-19 cases, stating that the "large crowds" are a "perfect set-up" for the virus to spread. In July 2020, Fauci advised the public to "avoid crowds of any type".

On July 6, 2020, Fauci spoke on a Facebook livestream, offering his opinion that the country's situation regarding COVID-19 "is really not good", pointing to more than 55,000 new cases on July 4, 2020. He said the United States was "still knee-deep in the first wave" of cases, and was experiencing a "resurgence of infections". On July 7, 2020, during a press conference, Fauci stated that it was a "false narrative to take comfort in a lower rate of death" for COVID-19 in the country: "There's so many other things that are very dangerous and bad about this virus, don't get yourself into false complacency." Both Trump and the White House had cited the falling death rate as proof of success of the Trump administration's response. After this appearance by Fauci, the White House canceled three media appearances that had been scheduled for him later that week. On July 7, 2020, Trump contradicted Fauci's comments describing a dire situation in the country, with Trump saying: "I think we are in a good place. I disagree with [Fauci]." While there were disagreements, Trump also at times praised Fauci.

On July 9, 2020, Trump publicly opined that Fauci "is a nice man, but he's made a lot of mistakes." By July 12, 2020, a White House official told media outlets that "several White House officials are concerned about the number of times Dr. Fauci has been wrong on things", passing to the media a list of purported mistakes made by Fauci during the outbreak. Included were statements Fauci made during a February 29, 2020, interview where he stated that "at this moment, there is no need to change anything that you're doing on a day-by-day basis." However, the White House list neglected to mention that in that same interview, Fauci had stated that the risk could change, "when you start to see community spread", and that the disease could morph into "a major outbreak" in the country.

As late as September 23, 2020, when U.S. coronavirus fatalities exceeded 200,000, conservatives continued to question Fauci's and the Centers for Disease Control and Prevention's (CDC) recommendations for responding to the pandemic. In a hearing before the Senate's Health, Education, Labor, and Pensions Committee, Kentucky's Senator Rand Paul asked him if he had "second thoughts" about his mitigation recommendations, including keeping six feet of distance from others and mask-wearing, claiming, "our death rate is essentially worse than Sweden's." Fauci stood by the guidelines, indicating Sweden's fatality rate exceeded those of other Scandinavian countries, and said the comparison between Sweden and the U.S. was not legitimate. Fauci said the recommendations remained valid. After Paul then asserted New York's high fatality rate showed that mitigation efforts were insufficient, Fauci replied, "You've misconstrued that, Senator, and you've done that repetitively in the past." Fauci explained further that New York State had succeeded in getting the virus under control by following the CDC's clinical guidelines. Paul had made numerous claims about herd immunity, Sweden's interventions to combat the pandemic, the contention that the populations of Asian countries have greater resilience against COVID-19, and statements about death rates due to the virus. Fauci would have several intense exchanges with Paul.

In October 2020, Fauci objected after his words, "I can't imagine that anybody could be doing more" were featured in an advertisement from the Trump campaign touting Trump's handling of the pandemic. Fauci said he did not consent to the ad, his words were taken out of context (he was actually referring to how hard the Coronavirus Task Force was working), and he had never made a political endorsement in his career. Also in October, Fauci criticized the Great Barrington Declaration's "focused protection" herd immunity strategy, calling it "total nonsense" and saying that it would lead to many avoidable deaths. Fauci said that 30 percent of the population had underlying health conditions that made them vulnerable to the virus and that "older adults, even those who are otherwise healthy, are far more likely than young adults to become seriously ill if they get COVID-19." He added, "This idea that we have the power to protect the vulnerable is total nonsense because history has shown that that's not the case. And if you talk to anybody who has any experience in epidemiology and infectious diseases, they will tell you that that is risky, and you'll wind up with many more infections of vulnerable people, which will lead to hospitalizations and deaths. So I think that we just got to look that square in the eye and say it's nonsense."

On October 18, 2020, Fauci mentioned that he was not surprised that Donald Trump contracted COVID-19. The next day, during a presidential call, Trump called Fauci "a disaster" and said that "people are tired of COVID." During a campaign rally in Phoenix, Arizona, on October 19, Trump launched attacks on his political rival Joe Biden, saying that Biden "wants to listen to Dr. Fauci" regarding the handling of the pandemic, upon which Biden merely replied "Yes" on Twitter. On October 31, The Washington Post published an extensive interview with Fauci, in which he voiced a candid assessment of the administration's COVID-19 policies and was critical of the influence of presidential advisor Scott Atlas.

Shortly after midnight on November 2, 2020, Trump insinuated he would fire Fauci "after the election" while on stage at a campaign rally at Miami-Opa Locka Executive Airport in Opa-locka, Florida. At the rally, he made false claims that the pandemic was "rounding the turn" and was met by audience chants of "Fire Fauci!", to which he responded, "Don't tell anybody, but let me wait until after the election ... I appreciate the advice." Despite the rhetoric, Fauci was not fired. On December 2, the United Kingdom became the first Western country to license a vaccine against the coronavirus (Pfizer-BioNTech). In response, Fauci said that the U.S. Food and Drug Administration (FDA) was proceeding "the correct way" and said the UK "really rushed through that approval". The next day Fauci apologized, telling the BBC "I have a great deal of confidence in what the UK does both scientifically and from a regulator standpoint. Our process is one that takes more time than it takes in the UK ... I did not mean to imply any sloppiness even though it came out that way."

On January 3, 2021, President Trump tweeted, "The number of cases and deaths of the China Virus is far exaggerated in the United States because of [the CDC's] ridiculous method of determination compared to other countries". That same morning, Fauci responded in an interview on NBC's Meet the Press, "The numbers are real. We have well over 300,000 deaths. We are averaging two- to three thousand deaths per day. All you need to do ... is go into the trenches, go into the hospitals, go into the intensive care units and see what is happening. Those are real numbers, real people, and real deaths." When asked if the 2021 United States Capitol attack was a COVID-19 superspreader event, Fauci stated: "I think for those people there, they probably put themselves at an increased risk because they essentially did not adhere to the fundamentals of public health and COVID-19 context which is universal wearing of masks, keeping physical distance, avoiding crowds in congregate settings. The fact that it was outdoors is a little bit better than if they were indoors completely. But you can still have a super spreader situation when you do things in a crowded way." On January 23, 2021, Fauci was quoted saying that letting the science speak on the pandemic got him "into a little bit of trouble" and got "push-back from people in the White House, including the president", during the Trump administration. Fauci was also reportedly blocked from appearing on The Rachel Maddow Show for some time because the Trump administration "didn't like the way [Maddow handles] things and they didn't want me on [the show]."

== Chief Medical Advisor to the President (2021–2022) ==
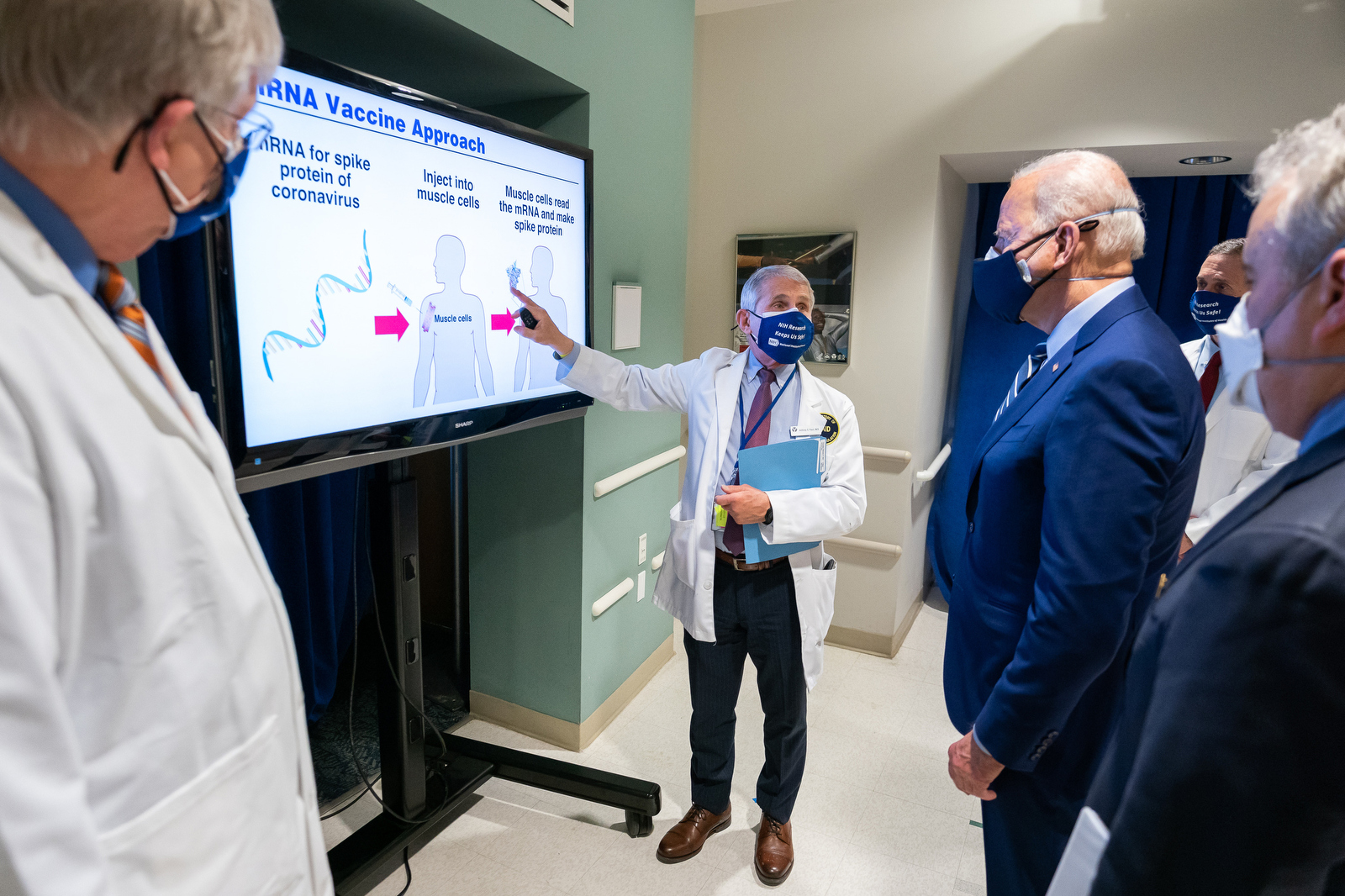
Fauci and President Joe Biden in February 2021

On December 3, 2020, President-elect Joe Biden asked Fauci, in addition to remaining in his role as director of the NIAID, to serve as the Chief Medical Advisor to the President in the Biden administration. Fauci accepted the offer. After the inauguration of Joe Biden in January 2021, Fauci said he experienced a "liberating feeling" in being able to speak freely about science without interference from the new administration. He pictured Biden's administration as committed to being "completely transparent, open and honest". Fauci was involved in the development of the Biden administration's plan for a nationwide COVID-19 vaccine rollout.

In early April 2021, Fauci said of the current situation in the United States that "It's almost a race between getting people vaccinated and this surge that seems to want to increase". In early May 2021, when asked if the CDC's summer camp guidance was excessive, Fauci responded by saying that "I wouldn't call them excessive, but they certainly are conservative" and added that the guidance "looks a bit strict" and "a bit stringent". Also in early May, Fauci said that he is "not convinced" that COVID-19 originated naturally and that "we should continue to investigate what went on in China until we continue to find out to the best of our ability what happened". In mid-May 2021, Fauci said that Americans who are fully vaccinated against COVID-19 no longer need to wear masks outdoors, except for in "completely crowded situations". This guidance was updated in July 2021 to recommend that all people wear masks regardless of vaccination status, in what Fauci said was due to the much more contagious Delta variant.

In May 2021, Fauci denied that the National Institutes of Health supported "gain-of-function research" at the Wuhan Institute of Virology. In early June 2021, over 3,000 internal government emails sent by Fauci from January to June 2020 were obtained by media outlets through Freedom of Information Act (FOIA) requests. These emails contain information about how the United States and Fauci initially responded to COVID-19. On June 22, 2021, Fauci said that the SARS-CoV-2 Delta variant is the "greatest threat" to eliminating COVID-19 in the United States. In December 2021, Fauci, along with virologist Jeffery Taubenberger and David M. Morens, endorsed the development of a universal coronavirus vaccine, advocating in favor of "an international collaborative effort to extensively sample coronaviruses from bats as well as wild and farmed animals to help understand the full 'universe' of existing and emerging coronaviruses."

In February 2022, Fauci told the Financial Times that "As we get out of the full-blown pandemic phase of Covid-19, which we are certainly heading out of, these decisions will increasingly be made on a local level rather than centrally decided or mandated. There will also be more people making their own decisions on how they want to deal with the virus." In March 2022, Fauci said that the United States should expect an increase in COVID-19 cases from the BA.2 subvariant of Omicron, but that it might not lead to a severe increase in hospitalizations and deaths. On April 27, 2022, Fauci said that the United States was "out of the full-blown explosive pandemic phase" of COVID-19. On May 15, 2022, Fauci said that he would resign if Donald Trump won the 2024 U.S. presidential election. On August 22, 2022, Fauci announced his intention to step down from his position in December "to pursue the next chapter" of his career. He resigned from his position on December 31 of that same year.

=== Pardon ===
President Biden granted Fauci a Full and Unconditional Pardon on January 19, 2025

On January 19, 2025, President Biden issued Fauci a preemptive pardon covering potential federal offenses between January 1, 2014, and January 19, 2025. The AP reported that the pardons were intended to guard against potential "revenge" by the incoming Trump administration, while Biden said they were intended to protect public servants from what he described as politically motivated prosecutions. Other news outlets described the pardon as an "unprecedented use" of the president's clemency powers.

== Later career ==
Fauci testifies before the Senate Homeland Security and Governmental Affairs Committee on the COVID-19 pandemic on July 29, 2026

On June 26, 2023, Georgetown University announced that Fauci would join its faculty as a distinguished professor, teaching in both the School of Medicine and McCourt School of Public Policy, effective July 1. On February 7, 2025, the United States Department of Health and Human Services terminated a $168,000 contract for a Fauci museum exhibit at the National Institutes of Health.

In June 2026, Director of National Intelligence Tulsi Gabbard released a collection of declassified documents concerning the origins of COVID-19. The accompanying Office of the Director of National Intelligence (ODNI) statement asserted that the released documents demonstrated that Anthony Fauci had manipulated intelligence assessments concerning COVID-19's origins and that his communications contradicted his 2024 congressional testimony. Subsequent analyses by CNN and Lawfare concluded that the declassified documents did not substantiate several of Gabbard's principal claims regarding Fauci's conduct.

On July 29, 2026, Fauci testified before the Senate upon being subpoenaed about COVID-19, during which he invoked his right to avoid self-incrimination under the Fifth Amendment to the United States Constitution over 100 times. Eight days later on August 6, 2026, the Senate Homeland Security Committee, where Fauci testified the week prior, voted to hold him in contempt due to his invocation of the Fifth Amendment.

== Cultural impact ==
Owing to his prominent role in the United States' response to numerous global pandemics, most notably HIV/AIDS and COVID-19, Fauci has become the subject of tributes and interpretations across various media, including television, literature, merchandising, and internet memes. Author Sally Quinn has credited Fauci as the inspiration for the love interest to the protagonist in her bestselling 1991 romance novel Happy Endings. Larry Kramer based the character Dr. Anthony Della Vida on Fauci in his play The Destiny of Me. Brad Pitt's performance as Fauci during the 2020 season of Saturday Night Live earned the actor an Emmy nomination, and praise from Fauci.

In the spring of 2020 amidst the COVID-19 pandemic, bakeries across the United States began selling pastries, particularly donuts, with Fauci's face on them to pay tribute to his work in the public health sector. In September 2021, Fauci, a documentary film about Fauci's life and career, was released by Magnolia Pictures. The film was produced by National Geographic Documentary Films. In November 2021, Skyhorse released a book by anti-vaccine activist Robert F. Kennedy Jr. titled The Real Anthony Fauci: Bill Gates, Big Pharma, and the Global War on Democracy and Public Health. In response, Fauci described the author as "a very disturbed individual".

== Personal life ==
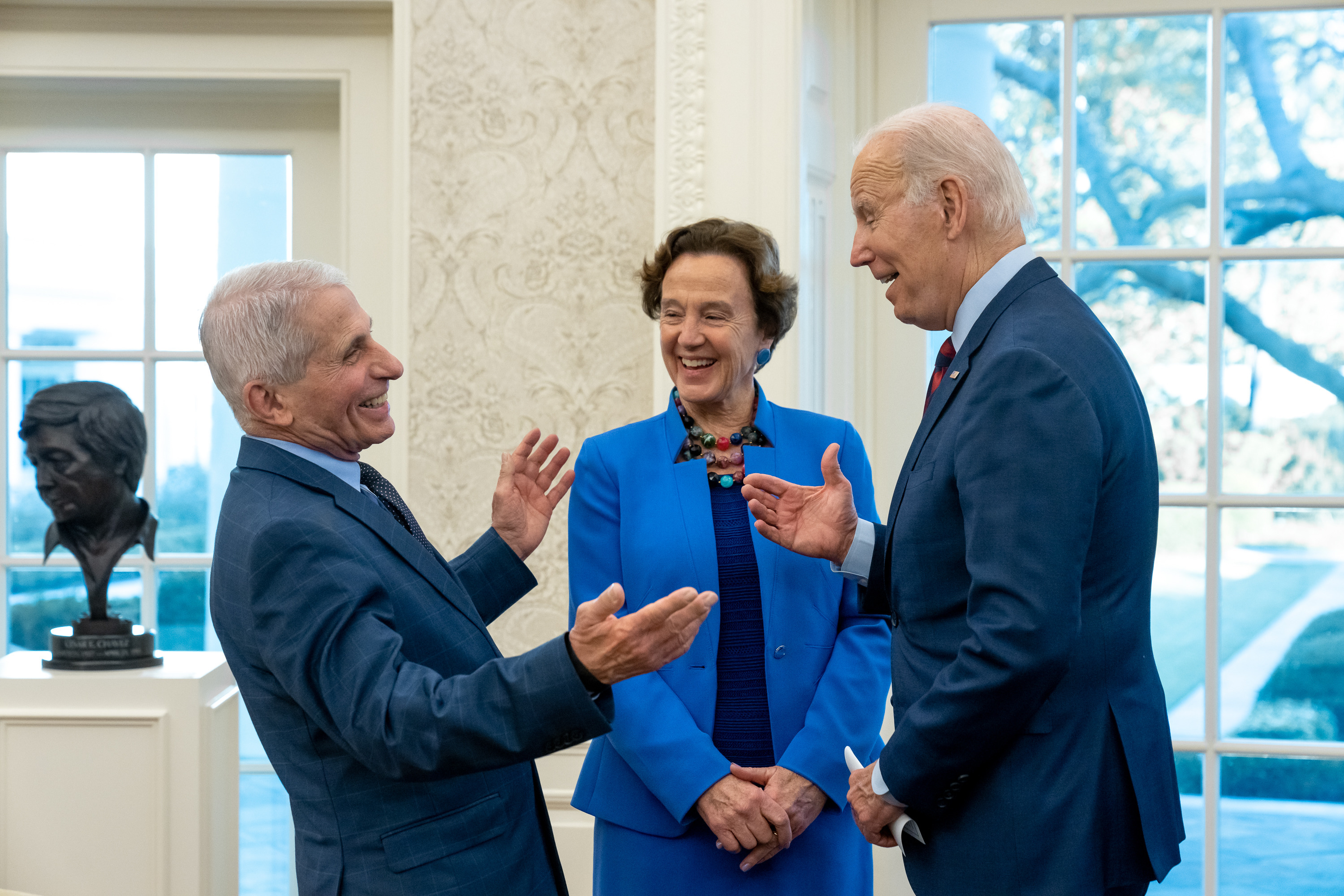
Fauci with his wife Christine Grady and President Joe Biden in 2023

Fauci is a longtime resident of Washington, D.C. The Washington Post reported in 2022 that he has lived in the same "comfortable but modest house since 1977". In 1985, he married Christine Grady, a nurse and bioethicist with the NIH, after they met while treating a patient. Grady is chief of the Department of Bioethics at the National Institutes of Health Clinical Center. Together, they have three adult daughters. At the time of his retirement, Fauci's annual salary was $480,654, making him the highest paid U.S. federal government employee at the time.

Fauci has described himself as "completely nonpolitical". His voter registration shows that he is not affiliated with any political party, although he still votes. Prior to 2020, he had positive relationships with both Democrats and Republicans, and considered George W. Bush a close friend: "Obviously there's been appropriate controversy regarding decisions regarding Iraq, but his moral compass about health equity is very strong." Fauci has specifically praised Bush's work to combat HIV/AIDS through PEPFAR, a global health initiative credited with saving over 20 million lives as of 2021, primarily in sub-Saharan Africa. According to Fauci, "[Bush's] exact words to me were, 'We have a moral responsibility as a rich nation to not have people suffer and die merely because of where they live and the circumstances in which they were born'". Former CDC director and CEO of Resolve to Save Lives, Tom Frieden, said that "I have no idea what his politics are. Reagan and both Bushes liked him. Clinton and Obama liked him".

In December 2023, Fauci stated that he still considers himself a Catholic, but he does not practice his faith anymore for "a number of complicated reasons"; clarifying his relationship with the Catholic Church, he stated:

I'm not against it. I identify myself as a Catholic. I was raised, I was baptized, I was confirmed, I was married in the Church. My children were baptized in the Church. But as far as practicing it, it seems almost like a pro forma thing that I don't really need to do.

== Memberships ==
On March 23, 2021, Fauci was admitted as an honorary fellow of the Royal College of Physicians of Ireland. Fauci has served as one of the principal editors of Harrison's Principles of Internal Medicine, named on the front cover, from the 11th edition published in 1986, through to the 21st edition, published in 2022. He was the editor-in-chief of the 14th and 17th editions.

== Awards and honors ==
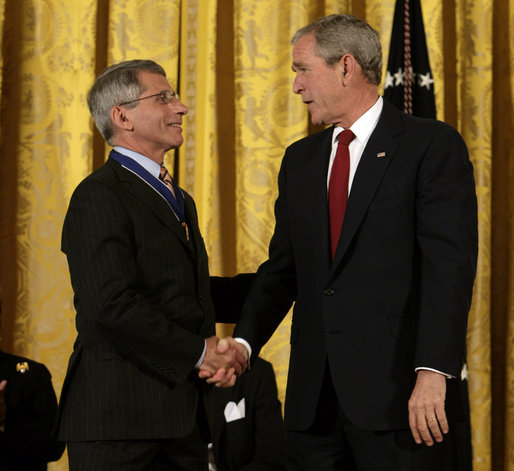
Fauci shaking hands with President George W. Bush after receiving the Presidential Medal of Freedom at the White House on June 19, 2008

- 1979: Arthur S. Flemming Award
- 1993: Honorary Doctor of Science, Bates College
- 1995: Ernst Jung Prize (shared with Samuel A. Wells Jr.)
- 1995: Honorary Doctor of Science, Duke University
- 1996: Honorary Doctor of Science, Colgate University
- 1999: Honorary Doctor of Public Service, Shippensburg University of Pennsylvania
- 2002: Albany Medical Center Prize
- 2003: Golden Plate Award, American Academy of Achievement
- 2005: National Medal of Science, President of the United States
- 2005: American Association of Immunologists Lifetime Achievement Award
- 2007: Mary Woodard Lasker Public Service Award, Lasker Foundation
- 2007: George M. Kober Medal, Association of American Physicians
- 2008: Presidential Medal of Freedom
- 2013: UCSF Medal, University of California, San Francisco
- 2013: Robert Koch Gold Medal, Robert Koch Foundation, Germany
- 2013: Prince Mahidol Award, Prince Mahidol Award Foundation, Thailand
- 2015: Honorary Doctor of Humane Letters, Johns Hopkins University
- 2015: Honorary Doctor of Public Service, The George Washington University
- 2016: John Dirks Canada Gairdner Global Health Award
- 2018: Honorary Doctor of Science, commencement speaker, American University
- 2018: Honorary Doctor of Science, Boston University
- 2019: Bertrand Russell Society Award
- 2020: Federal Employee of the Year, Partnership for Public Service
- 2020: Presidential Citation for Exemplary Leadership, National Academy of Medicine
- 2020: Ripple of Hope Award, Robert F. Kennedy Center for Justice and Human Rights
- 2020: Time's Guardian of the Year, along with the frontline health workers, Assa Traoré, Porche Bennett-Bey, and racial justice organizers.
- 2020: Harris Dean's Award, The University of Chicago Harris School of Public Policy
- 2020: Knight Grand Cross of the Order of Merit of the Italian Republic
- 2020: John Maddox Prize, Sense about Science
- 2021: Blessed are the Peacemakers Award from Catholic Theological Union
- 2021: Humanist of the Year by the American Humanist Association
- 2021: Public Welfare Medal of the National Academy of Sciences
- 2021: Dan David Prize, Dan David Foundation, Israel
- 2021: President's Medal, The George Washington University
- 2021: Honorary Doctor of Science, McGill University
- 2022: Honorary Doctor of Science, Sapienza University of Rome
- 2022: Honorary Doctor of Science, commencement speaker, University of Michigan
- 2022: Hutch Award winner, Fred Hutchinson Cancer Research Center
- 2023: Order of the Rising Sun, 2nd Class, Gold and Silver Star
- 2023: Honorary Doctor of Science, commencement speaker, Washington University in St. Louis
- 2023: Sheba Global Health Award from Sheba Medical Center
- 2023: Foreign Member of the Royal Society.
- 2023: Calderone Prize

In addition to receiving an honorary degree in 2015, Fauci was invited to deliver guest remarks on May 21, 2020, for the Johns Hopkins University Class of 2020. The College of the Holy Cross renamed its science complex the Anthony S. Fauci Integrated Science Complex on June 11, 2022. In 2025, he received an honorary degree and was invited to speak at the commencement of the humanities and sciences graduates at the University of San Francisco. In 2026, Fauci and his wife Christine Grady gave the keynote address at Macalester College's commencement ceremony, where they both received honorary degrees.

== Selected works and publications ==
External videos
- "The Promise and Peril of DNA Research" (interview). Think Tank with Ben Wattenberg, March 5, 1998.

- Fauci, Anthony S.; Dale, David C.; Balow, James E. (March 1976). "Glucocorticosteroid Therapy: Mechanisms of Action and Clinical Considerations". Annals of Internal Medicine. 84 (3): 304–15. doi:10.7326/0003-4819-84-3-304. PMID 769625. Wikidata ()
- Fauci, Anthony S.; Haynes, Barton F.; Katz, Paul (November 1, 1978). "The Spectrum of Vasculitis: Clinical, Pathologic, Immunologic, and Therapeutic Considerations". Annals of Internal Medicine. 89 (5_Part_1): 660–76. doi:10.7326/0003-4819-89-5-660. PMID 31121. Wikidata ()
- Fauci, Anthony S.; Haynes, Barton F.; Katz, Paul; Wolff, Sheldon M. (January 1983). "Wegener's Granulomatosis: Prospective Clinical and Therapeutic Experience With 85 Patients for 21 Years". Annals of Internal Medicine. 98 (1): 76–85. doi:10.7326/0003-4819-98-1-76. PMID 6336643. Wikidata ()
- Fauci, Anthony S.; Macher, Abe M.; Longo, Dan L.; Lane, H. Clifford; Rook, Alain H.; Masur, Henry; Gelmann, Edward P. (January 1984). "Acquired Immunodeficiency Syndrome: Epidemiologic, Clinical, Immunologic, and Therapeutic Considerations". Annals of Internal Medicine. 100 (1): 92–106. doi:10.7326/0003-4819-100-1-92. PMID 6318629. Wikidata ()
- Fauci, AS (February 5, 1988). "The human immunodeficiency virus: infectivity and mechanisms of pathogenesis". Science. 239 (4840): 617–622. Bibcode:1988Sci...239..617F. doi:10.1126/science.3277274. PMID 3277274. Wikidata ()
- Pantaleo, Giuseppe; Graziosi, Cecilia; Fauci, Anthony S. (February 4, 1993). "The Immunopathogenesis of Human Immunodeficiency Virus Infection". New England Journal of Medicine. 328 (5): 327–335. doi:10.1056/NEJM199302043280508. PMID 8093551. Wikidata ()
- Fauci, Anthony S. (December 1996). "Host factors and the pathogenesis of HIV-induced disease". Nature. 384 (6609): 529–534. Bibcode:1996Natur.384..529F. doi:10.1038/384529A0. PMID 8955267. S2CID 4370482. Wikidata ()
- Morens, David M.; Folkers, Gregory K.; Fauci, Anthony S. (July 8, 2004). "The challenge of emerging and re-emerging infectious diseases". Nature. 430 (6996): 242–249. Bibcode:2004Natur.430..242M. doi:10.1038/nature02759. PMC 7094993. PMID 15241422. Wikidata ()
- Morens, David M.; Fauci, Anthony S. (April 2007). "The 1918 Influenza Pandemic: Insights for the 21st Century". The Journal of Infectious Diseases. 195 (7): 1018–1028. doi:10.1086/511989. PMID 17330793. Wikidata ()
- Johnston, Margaret I.; Fauci, Anthony S. (August 28, 2008). "An HIV Vaccine – Challenges and Prospects". New England Journal of Medicine. 359 (9): 888–890. doi:10.1056/NEJMp0806162. PMID 18753644. Wikidata ()
- Fauci, Anthony S.; Harrison, Ross, eds. (2008). Harrison's Principles of Internal Medicine (17th ed.). McGraw-Hill Medical. ISBN 978-0-07-159991-7. OCLC 1109159992.
- Fauci, Anthony S.; Lane, H. Clifford; Redfield, Robert R. (March 26, 2020). "Covid-19 – Navigating the Uncharted". New England Journal of Medicine. 382 (13): 1268–1269. doi:10.1056/NEJMe2002387. PMC 7121221. PMID 32109011.

=== Memoir ===
- Fauci, Anthony S. (2024). On Call: A Doctor's Journey in Public Service. Penguin Random House. ISBN 978-0-593-65747-8.

== See also ==
- Communication of the Trump administration during the COVID-19 pandemic
- White House COVID-19 outbreak
- U.S. federal government response to the COVID-19 pandemic

== Notes ==
Government offices
Preceded by Richard M. Krause	5th Director of the National Institute of Allergy and Infectious Diseases; 1984–2022	Succeeded by Hugh Auchincloss; Acting
Vacant Title last held by Ronny Jackson (2019)	2nd Chief Medical Advisor to the President; 2021–2022; Served under: Joe Biden	Vacant
