= Richard M. Krause =

American physician and immunologist

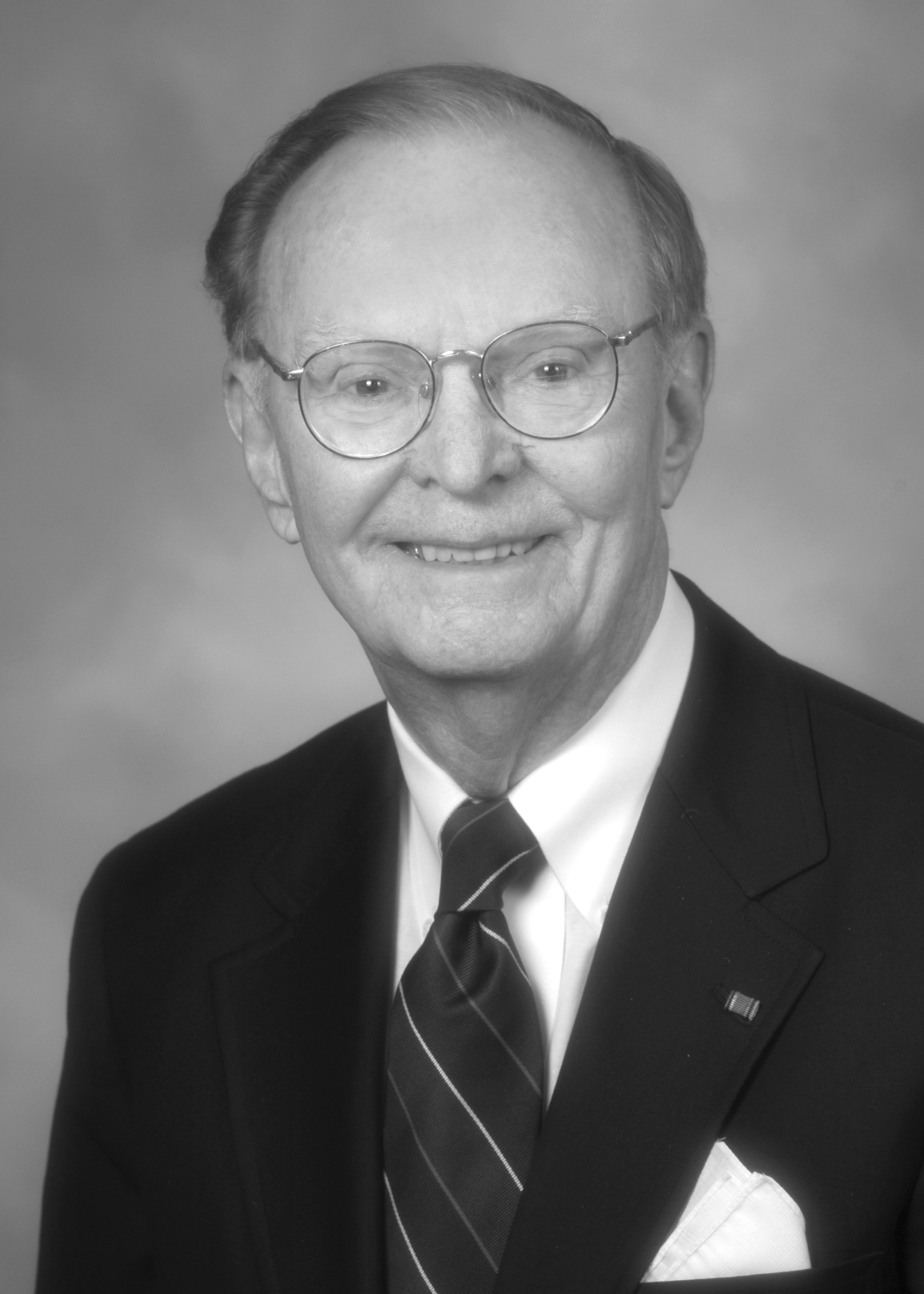
- Krause in 2003

4th Director of the National Institute of Allergy and Infectious Diseases
- In office 1975–1984
- President: Gerald Ford; Jimmy Carter; Ronald Reagan
- Preceded by: Dorland J. Davis
- Succeeded by: Anthony Fauci

Personal details
- Born: Richard Michael Krause; January 4, 1925 Marietta, Ohio, U.S.
- Died: January 6, 2015 (aged 90) Washington, D.C., U.S.
- Education: Marietta College (BA); Case Western Reserve University (MD)
- Scientific career
- Fields: Immunology, microbiology
- Institutions: Rockefeller University; National Institute of Allergy and Infectious Diseases; Emory University
- Academic advisors: Charles H. Rammelkamp, Jr. Oswald Avery; Rebecca Lancefield

Richard Michael Krause (January 4, 1925 – January 6, 2015) was an American physician, microbiologist, and immunologist. He was the director of the National Institute of Allergy and Infectious Diseases from 1975 to 1984. Krause later served as the dean of medicine at Emory University before returning to National Institutes of Health as a senior scientific advisor at the John E. Fogarty International Center. Krause was formerly a longtime professor at Rockefeller University.

== Early life and education ==
Richard Michael Krause was born in Marietta, Ohio, on January 4, 1925. His father was a chemistry professor at Marietta College. He received a B.A. degree from Marietta in 1947. For two years before graduation, Krause served in the United States Army guarding German prisoners of war at Fort Riley. In 1952 he graduated from Case Western Reserve University School of Medicine. Charles H. Rammelkamp, Jr. was Krause's research mentor. In the course of his medical studies, he participated in epidemiologic research on the prevention of rheumatic fever, which spurred his interest in the relationship between infection and immunity.

== Career ==
In 1954, following training at Barnes Hospital in St. Louis under immunologist Barry Wood, he joined the Rockefeller Institute and Hospital where he rose to the rank of professor. At Rockefeller, Krause worked with his role models Oswald Avery and Rebecca Lancefield and became lifelong friends with Purnell W. Choppin and Maclyn McCarty. The persistent theme underlying his research concerned the substances in bacteria that stimulate the body's immune system. This is best exemplified by his research on the immune response to streptococcal polysaccharides. This led to an examination of the genetic factors that influenced the immune response. In recognition of his research achievements, he was elected to the U.S. National Academy of Sciences in 1977.

Appointed the director of National Institute of Allergy and Infectious Diseases (NIAID) in 1975, Krause was among the first to perceive "the return of the microbes." He guided the institute through a period of growth to cope with the re-emergence of microbial diseases as health threats and to stimulate research on the complexity of the immune system.

NIAID was reorganized along programmatic lines and the Rocky Mountain Laboratory was restructured into independent laboratories. The institute also led the way in recombinant DNA research and technology. Responding to the emergence of the AIDS epidemic in the early 1980s, Krause organized field studies in Haiti and Zaire in the search for the origins of the virus. Krause faced criticism over his level of urgency in addressing the AIDS crisis. Activists such as Larry Kramer stated that Krause "crucified" the gay population by not responding quicker to the crisis.

In July 1984, Krause retired from the U.S. Public Health Service and became dean of medicine at Emory University. In 1989, he returned to National Institutes of Health (NIH) to become a senior scientific advisor at the Fogarty International Center.

== Personal life ==
Krause died on January 6, 2015, in Washington, D.C. Scientist and NIH researcher Michael W. Krause is his grandnephew.
