= Christine Grady =

Nurse-bioethicist and researcher

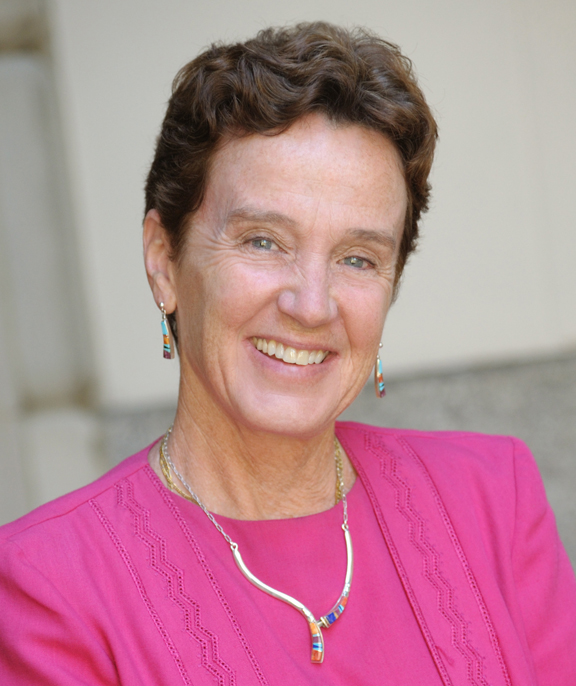
- Grady in 2018
- Born: 1951 or 1952 (age 74–75); Livingston, New Jersey, U.S.
- Education: Georgetown University (BS, PhD); Boston College (MSN)
- Spouse: Anthony Fauci (m. 1985)
- Children: 3
- Awards: National Institutes of Health CEO Award
- Scientific career
- Fields: Bioethics
- Workplaces: National Institutes of Health Clinical Center
- Thesis: Ethical Issues in the Development and Testing of a Preventive HIV Vaccine (1993)

Christine Grady (born 1951/1952) is an American nurse and bioethicist who served as the head of the Department of Bioethics at the National Institutes of Health Clinical Center. In 2026, Grady joined Georgetown University as an advisor and faculty member.

== Early life and education ==
Grady was born and raised in Livingston, New Jersey. Her father, John H. Grady Jr., was a graduate of Yale University and a U.S. Navy veteran who served as the mayor of Livingston. Her mother, Barbara, was an assistant dean at Seton Hall University School of Law.

Grady graduated from Livingston High School, after which she earned a B.S. in nursing and biology from Georgetown University in 1974, a Master of Science in Nursing from Boston College in 1978, and a Ph.D. in philosophy from Georgetown University in 1993.

Grady spent two years working as a nurse for Project HOPE in Brazil. There, she learned to speak Portuguese. She subsequently joined the NIH, where she met her future husband Anthony Fauci.

== Career ==
Grady has worked in nursing, clinical research, and clinical care, with a specialization in HIV. She was a commissioner on the Presidential Commission for the Study of Bioethical Issues from 2010 and 2017.

Grady is a member of the National Academy of Medicine, a senior fellow at the Kennedy Institute of Ethics, and a fellow of The Hastings Center and American Academy of Nursing. She is also a member of the board of directors of the Children's Inn, which houses children and young adults who are being treated at the NIH. She received the National Institutes of Health CEO Award in 2017 and the Director's Award from the same organization in 2015 and 2017.

In April 2025, Grady was reassigned from her role at the National Institutes of Health. The changes were part of a broader set of changes at the Department of Health and Human Services.

In March 2026, Georgetown University appointed Grady to a number of roles, including professor of neuroscience in the School of Medicine, senior advisor to the Executive Vice President for Health Sciences on bioethics and neuroethics, research scholar in the Kennedy Institute of Ethics, and faculty member of the Pellegrino Center for Clinical Bioethics.

== Personal life ==
Grady is married to Anthony Fauci, an American immunologist and former head of the National Institute of Allergy and Infectious Diseases (NIAID) at the National Institutes of Health. They have three daughters.
