= Charles H. Rammelkamp =

American educator and college administrator

Charles Henry Rammelkamp
- Born: 25 February 1874
- Died: 5 April 1932 (aged 58)
- Education: Cornell University
- Known for: President of the Illinois College (1905–1932)
- Scientific career
- Fields: University President

Charles Henry Rammelkamp (1874–1932) was an American educator and college administrator who served as president of the Illinois College from 1905 to 1932. He was educated at Cornell University where he received a bachelor's degree in 1896 and a Ph.D. in 1900, and was a member of the Quill and Dagger Society. From 1901 to 1902, he served as an instructor in the history department of Stanford University. In 1902, he was appointed professor of history and political science in Illinois College. He was selected as president of the university in 1905 and served in that role for 27 years.

Physician and scientist Charles H. Rammelkamp, Jr. is his son.
