= Pathema =

Pathema was one of the eight bioinformatics resource centers funded by the National Institute of Allergy and Infectious Diseases (NIAID), a component of the National Institute of Health (NIH), which is an agency of the United States Department of Health and Human Services.

Pathema was funded for five years from 2004 through a contract to The J. Craig Venter Institute, and is currently led by PI Granger Sutton.

Pathema is the web resource for JCVI's NIAID-funded Bioinformatics Resource Center, and was one of eight such centers designed to support bio-defense and infectious disease research. The overarching goal of Pathema is to provide a core resource that will accelerated scientific progress towards understanding, detection, diagnosis and treatment of diseases caused by six clades of Category A-C pathogens (Bacillus anthracis, Clostridium botulinum, Burkholderia mallei, Burkholderia pseudomallei, Clostridium perfringens, and Entamoeba histolytica) involved in new and re-emerging infectious diseases. Pathema provides comprehensive curated datasets for the targeted pathogen clades, along with advanced bioinformatics capabilities geared specifically towards biodefense requirements, and the identification of potential targets for vaccine development, therapeutics and diagnostics.

== Supported Pathema organisms ==
Pathema-Bacillus

- Bacillus anthracis
- Bacillus cereus
- Bacillus thuringiensis
- Bacillus subtilis
- Bacillus pumilus

Pathema-Burkholderia

- Burkholderia mallei
- Burkholderia pseudomallei
- Burkholderia thailandensis
- Burkholderia ambifaria
- Burkholderia cenocepacia
- Burkholderia multivorans
- Burkholderia vietnamiensis
- Burkholderia xenovorans
- Burkholderia sp.
- Burkholderia phages
- Pseudomonas aeruginosa
- Ralstonia solanacearum

Pathema-Clostridium

- Clostridium acetobutylicum
- Clostridium botulinum
- Clostridium butyricum
- Clostridioides difficile
- Clostridium kluyveri
- Clostridium novyi
- Clostridium perfringens
- Clostridium phytofermentans
- Clostridium tetani
- Clostridium thermocellum

Pathema-Entamoeba

- Entamoeba histolytica
- Entamoeba dispar
- Entamoeba invadens

== Pathema analysis tools ==
Pathema supports a suite of over 50 web-based single gene, whole-genome and multi-genome comparative tools to facilitate analyses of genomic sequence and annotation data of over 80 NIAID Category A-C prokaryotic pathogens. Tools available on the BRC resource are developed and customized to best meet the scientific needs of the pathogen research community based on feedback solicited through community outreach. Additionally, they are designed to facilitate scientific exploration in the areas of functional curation, pathogenicity, therapeutics, comparative analysis and functional genomics. While every tool has several applications, taken together they provides numerous opportunities for discovery and hypothesis generation.

The suite of Pathema analysis tools include:

- Over 25 different search capabilities allow users to mine and retrieve data stored in the BRC comparative database. Search tools query genes, genomes, sequences or text, matching user-defined strings across gene loci, gene symbols and protein product names. Other queries include EC#, GenBank, SwissProt, and GO id searches. Common sequence search methods such as BLAST, HMM and protein motif searches are also available.
- Over 20 different displays and analyses of whole-genome data. Whole-genome data can be displayed graphically as a linear representation of genes on regions of a chromosome or as a complete circle for an entire chromosome. Users can investigate biochemical pathways, codon usage tables, percent GC plots, computer generated 2D and restriction digest gels, and retrieve summary information such as average gene size or numbers of coding regions as viewable and downloadable tables and lists.
- Over 15 different comparative analysis tools. The basis for Pathema's comparative tools is either pre-generated protein clusters or All vs. All searches. Incorporated, are the most popular tools of the publicly available Sybil comparative analysis suite. Sybil uses pre-generated protein clusters as the underlying data for its synteny gradient and comparative genomic displays, with protein cluster ortholog, paralog and singleton data available to the user.
- Individual gene pages highlighting annotation data and associated evidence as well as single gene analysis tools. Annotation data displayed and downloadable includes product name, gene symbol, EC number, GO ids, functional role category assignment, DNA sequence and protein sequence. Calculating the TmHMM profile, secondary structure and third position GC-Skew are just a few types of analyses users can perform. Links to other relevant resources such as Swiss-Prot, GenBank, Prosite, Pfam, etc., are also available.
