= Dorland J. Davis =

American physician and immunologist (1911–1990)

Dorland Jones Davis
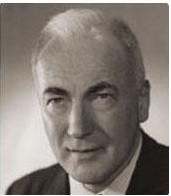

3rd Director of the National Institute of Allergy and Infectious Diseases
- In office 1964–1975
- President: Lyndon B. Johnson; Richard Nixon; Gerald Ford
- Preceded by: Justin M. Andrews
- Succeeded by: Richard Krause

Personal details
- Born: Dorland J. Davis; July 2, 1911 Chicago, Illinois, US
- Died: April 11, 1990 (aged 79) Washington, D.C., US
- Spouse: Caroline Gertrude Davis
- Children: 4
- Education: University of Illinois (BS); Johns Hopkins University (MD, DPH)
- Scientific career
- Fields: Epidemiology
- Workplaces: US Public Health Service; National Institute of Allergy and Infectious Diseases

Dorland Jones Davis (July 2, 1911 – April 11, 1990) was an American physician, commissioned officer in the U.S. Public Health Service (PHS). He was the director of the National Institute of Allergy and Infectious Diseases from 1964 to 1975.

== Early life and education ==
Davis was born in Chicago, Illinois, on July 2, 1911. His father was a professor of pathology at the University of Illinois school of medicine. Davis attended the International School, Geneva, Switzerland, 1927–1928. He received a B.S. degree from the University of Illinois in 1933, an M.D. degree from the Johns Hopkins University in 1937, and a DrPH. degree from Johns Hopkins in 1940.

== Career ==
Davis completed his medical internship at the Baltimore City Hospital before enrolling in the Johns Hopkins School of Public Health for his DrPH (Doctor of Public Health) doctorate. After taking the competitive exam to enter the Public Health Service (PHS), he was one of 20 applicants out of 120, to be offered a commission in the PHS. His first assignment was the Division of Infectious Diseases of the National Institute of Health (NIH), where he studied Chagas disease, an infection by the parasite trypanosome cruzi then prevalent in Central and South America. Davis developed an antigen-based diagnostic test for the disease. He became a commissioned officer in the U.S. Public Health Service (PHS) in 1939 and was assigned to the Division of Infectious Diseases, National Institute of Health. In 1943, he served State Department in North Africa as a member of a medical team investigating endemic diseases, particularly malaria and typhus. Davis advanced through grades of PHS to assistant surgical general.

Davis returned to the Division of Infectious Diseases and in 1954, was appointed chief of the Laboratory of Infectious Diseases, National Microbiological Institute. In 1956, he was named associate director in charge of research for the institute, now called the National Institute of Allergy and Infectious Diseases. In 1962, Davis became director of intramural research, and in 1964, NIAID Director. Awarded Public Health Service Meritorious Service Medal in 1967. Awarded in 1971 the Public Health Service Distinguished Service Medal.

In the 1960s, cellular immunology was offering scientists new ways to study various disorders. Davis established the first allergic disease centers at universities and medical centers around the United States to help translate basic research findings into new treatments. Nationwide research centers to study sexually transmitted diseases and influenza also were established. During this time, the Institute took over management of two international research programs: the U.S.-Japan Cooperative Medical Science Program and the International Centers for Medical Research and Training. Davis left NIAID in 1975 when he retired from PHS as assistant surgeon general.

== Personal life ==
He died from cancer April 11, 1990 at Bethesda Naval Hospital near Washington DC.
