= John La Montagne =

Mexican-American biomedical scientist (1943–2004)

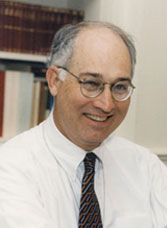
- Born: January 1, 1943; Mexico City, Mexico
- Died: November 2, 2004 (aged 61); Mexico City, Mexico
- Education: University of Texas at Austin; Tulane University
- Awards: Presidential Rank Award of Meritorious Executive
- Scientific career
- Workplaces: National Institute of Allergy and Infectious Diseases

John Ring La Montagne (January 1, 1943 – November 2, 2004) was a Mexican-American biomedical scientist who served as the deputy director of the National Institute of Allergy and Infectious Diseases from 1998 to 2004. He specialized in viral vaccines, HIV/AIDS research, and oversaw NIH's biodefense research after the September 11 attacks.

== Early life and education ==
La Montagne was born in Mexico City on January 1, 1943. He studied microbiology at University of Texas at Austin. La Montagne completed a Ph.D. in bacterial genetics at Tulane University in 1971. He trained in the laboratory of Julius Youngner at the University of Pittsburgh School of Medicine where he researched animal viruses.

== Career ==
In 1976, he came to NIH as the Influenza Program Officer at the NIAID. He became the program officer for the viral vaccines program in 1983, and the Influenza and Viral Respiratory Diseases Program Officer in 1984. Beginning in 1986, La Montagne assumed the role of director of the AIDS program. In 1987 he was appointed director of the microbiology and infectious diseases program, which became a division in 1988. La Montagne was appointed Deputy Director of the NIAID in February 1998 and served until his death in November 2004.

La Montagne made contributions to the national and international effort against emerging and re-emerging infectious diseases, including biodefense-related activities, and has been recognized internationally for his leadership in this area. He played a central role in the organization of the Multilateral Initiative on Malaria, an international effort involving research, control, and development agencies from the U.S., Europe, and Africa. In addition, he served as a member of the Scientific Advisory Groups of Experts on Vaccines and Biologicals as well as for Vaccines and Immunization for the World Health Organization. He chaired the WHO Task Force on Strategic Planning for the Children's Vaccine Initiative, advised the Pan American Health Organization on their programs in vaccine research implementation, and served as a member of the board of the Global Alliance for Tuberculosis Drug Development. La Montagne also served as a member of the Biomedical Research Confederation Executive Steering Committee at Ft. Detrick, Maryland, and as co-chair of the Research and Development Gaps Working Group, a component of the Weapons of Mass Destruction Subcommittee of the National Science and Technology Council. His administrative leadership at NIH included membership on the NIH Community Advisory Board for Security and the recently formed NIH Ethics Advisory Committee.

== Awards and honors ==
La Montagne received prestigious awards for his scientific accomplishments, including the PHS Special Recognition Award for leadership in childhood vaccine research programs, the Surgeon General's Certificate of Appreciation, the Presidential Rank Award of Meritorious Executive, the Distinguished Executive Award for his work in the areas of infectious diseases research of global health relevance, the Secretary's Award for Distinguished Service for leadership of acellular pertussis vaccine trials, and most recently the Secretary's Award for Distinguished Service for design and implementation of critically important biodefense strategies.

== Personal life ==
La Montagne married Mary Elaine Elliot in 1968. He lived in Alexandria, Virginia for a majority of his life. He died of a pulmonary embolism on November 2, 2004, at the Mexico City International Airport.
