= Geoffroy de Lagasnerie =

French philosopher and sociologist

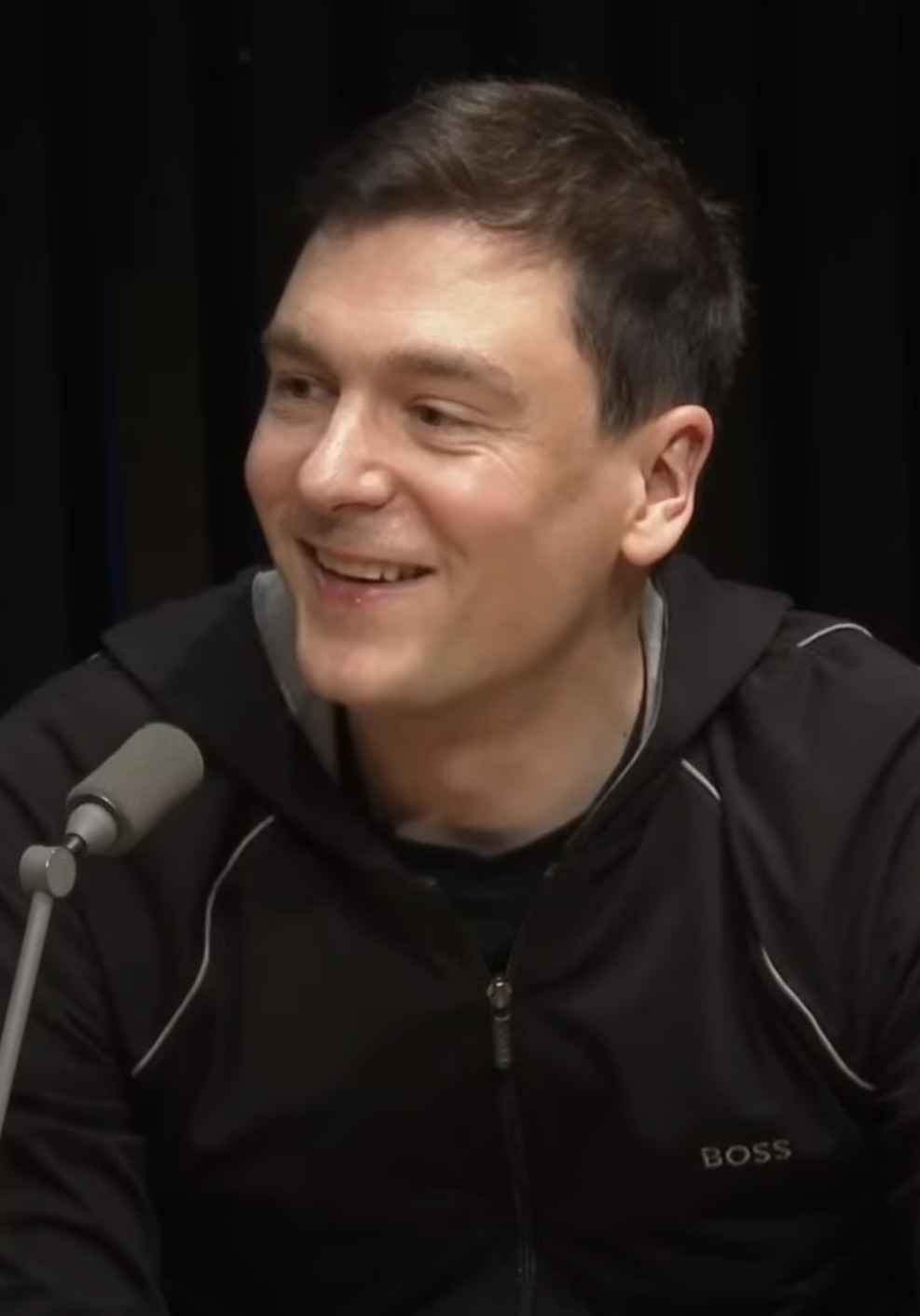
- Born: 1981 (age 44–45)
- Education: Ecole normale supérieure Paris-Saclay; École des hautes études en sciences sociales
- Writing career
- Subjects: Sociology, philosophy

Geoffroy de Lagasnerie (born 1981) is a French philosopher and sociologist.

He is the author of several books, articles and lectures pertaining to social and political philosophy, epistemology and critical theory, and the sociology of culture and intellectual life; with a particular interest in the work of Pierre Bourdieu and Michel Foucault.

== Biography ==
=== Early life and education ===
Lagasnerie studied at École normale supérieure de Cachan, where he received the agrégation in economic and social sciences. He later on received his PhD in sociology from the School for Advanced Studies in the Social Sciences.

=== Professional life ===
After teaching at the Sorbonne and Sciences Po universities, Lagasnerie took up a position as a professor of philosophy and human sciences at the École Nationale Supérieure d'Arts in Cergy.

He is the director of the à venir collection published by Fayard.

=== Work ===
His work largely pertains to social and political philosophy, epistemology and critical theory, as well as the sociology of cultural and intellectual life. Additionally, Lagasnerie has been highly critical of the higher education system in France.

In 2015 he published The Art of the Revolt: Snowden, Assange, Manning. The book focused on the role of whistleblowers, particularly Edward Snowden, Julian Assange, and Chelsea Manning, in maintaining and strengthening democracy. The French weekly journal Les Inrocks named Lagasnerie as one of the most influential thinkers in contemporary French culture, and included the book in its list of the most influential essays of 2015. The Art of the Revolt was translated into English in 2017.

In September 2015, Lagasnerie published a Manifesto for an Intellectual and Political Counteroffensive alongside writer Edouard Louis. Featured on the front page of Le Monde, and later reprinted in English by the Los Angeles Review of Books, the letter denounced the legitimization of right-wing agendas in public discourse and offered terms for leftist intellectual reengagement in public debate.

In February 2016, Lagasnerie published an article in openDemocracy titled "Beyond Powerlessness" which calls for the creation of new political practices.

In 2016, Lagasnerie published Juger. The book is a reflection on the criminal justice system, power and violence. It also includes reflections on the methodology of sociology: in the last chapter, Lagasnerie argues that ethnography is an inherently "conservative" framework for understanding society. The French weekly journal Les Inrocks included the book in its list of the top events of 2016. Its academic reception was much more mixed, and the book received strong criticism.

He is described by Achille Mbembe as "one of the most talented of the new wave of French theory."

He is described by France Inter, a major French public radio channel, as one of the most important intellectuals in France today.

He is committed in the antiracist movement and the fight against police brutality in France as part of Comité Adama (after the name of a victim of police brutality). De Lagasnerie co-wrote a book with Assa Traoré on the fight against state violence and police brutality.

In his book La Conscience Politique, he argues for a more realist political theory, one that fully acknowledges that state violence is the one thing in one's life that one can never escape.

== Publications ==
=== Books in English ===
Foucault Against Neoliberalism? (Trans. Matthew MacLellan). Rowman and Littlefield, 2020

Judge and Punish. The Penal State on Trial. (Trans. Lara Vergnaud). Stanford University Press, 2018.

The Art of Revolt. Snowden, Assange, Manning. Stanford University Press, 2017.

=== Books in French ===
- L'empire de l'université. Sur Bourdieu, les intellectuels et le journalisme, Amsterdam, 2007.
- Sur la science des œuvres. Questions à Pierre Bourdieu (et à quelques autres), Cartouche, 2011.
- Logique de la création. Sur l'Université, la vie intellectuelle et les conditions de l'innovation, Fayard, 2011.
- La dernière leçon de Michel Foucault. Sur le néolibéralisme, la théorie et la politique, Fayard, 2012.
- Que signifie penser, in François Caillat (dir.), Foucault contre lui-même, PUF, 2014.
- L'Art de la révolte. Snowden, Assange, Manning, Fayard, 2015.
- Juger. L'Etat pénal face à la sociologie, Fayard, 2016.
- "Penser dans un monde mauvais", PUF, 2017.
- Le Combat Adama, with Assa Traoré, Stock, 2019.
- La conscience politique, Fayard, 2019.
- Sortir de notre impuissance politique, Fayard, 2020.
- 3. Une aspiration au dehors. Éloge de l'amitié, Flammarion, 2023.
- Par delà le principe de répression. Dix leçons sur l'abolitionnisme pénal, Flammarion, 2025
- L’âme noire de la démocratie. Manifeste pour un autre idéal politique, Flammarion, 2026

=== Volumes collectifs ===
- Exister socialement. Sur la sociologie et les théories de la reconnaissance, in Pierre Bourdieu, l'insoumission en héritage. with Édouard Louis (dir.) Didier Eribon, Frédéric Lordon, Arlette Farge and Annie Ernaux. PUF, 2013.
- Que signifie Penser? in Foucault contre lui-même, by François Caillat (dir.), Leo Bersani, Arlette Farge, George Didi-Huberman, PUF, 2014. Translation Foucault Against Himself, Arsenal Pulp Press, 2015.

=== Articles accessible online ===
- L'inconscient sociologique, Les Temps Modernes, 3/2009, n^{o} 654, p. 99-108, lire en ligne.
