= Assa Traoré =

French Black Lives Matter activist

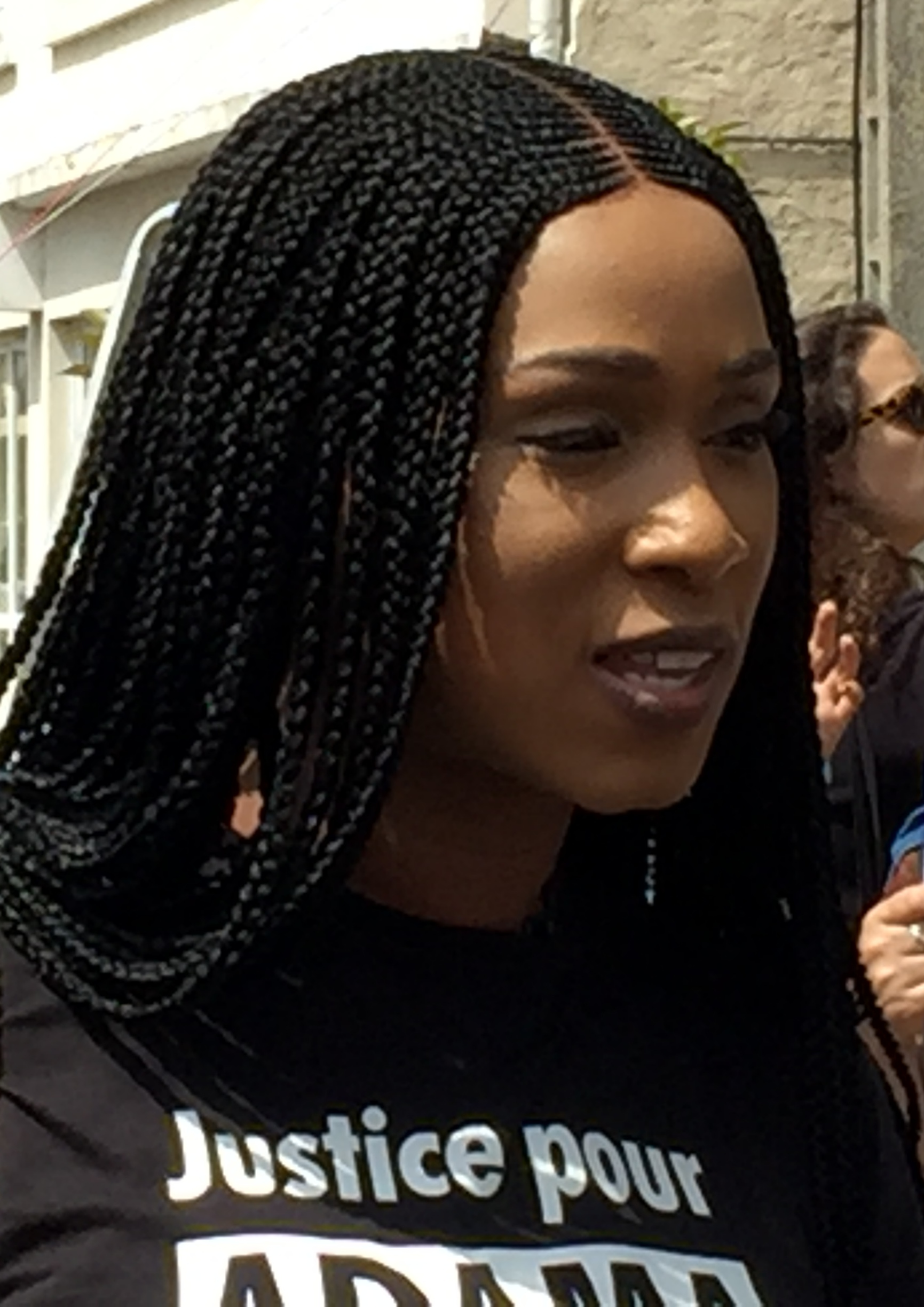
- Traoré at the 2018 march
- Born: January 1985 (age 41); 9th arrondissement of Paris
- Occupations: Activist, former teacher
- Known for: Activism, leader of the Truth and Justice for Adama Committee
- Children: 3

Assa Traoré (born 1985) is a French-Malian anti-racism activist and leader of the Truth and Justice for Adama Committee, named after her half-brother, Adama Traoré, who died in police custody, the circumstances of his death having been disputed. An autopsy raised in court indicated he may have died from positional asphyxiation during his arrest.

Since Adama's death, Assa has attempted to challenge the institutions of France, rallying activists from black neighbourhoods and engaging medical experts to try to get to the bottom of his death. On July 18, 2020, in the wake of the George Floyd protests, she participated in the "Marche pour Adama" (March for Adama), and called for the prosecution of the gendarmerie regarding her brother's death. For her services to the Black Lives Matter campaign, she received the BET's Global Good Honouree Award. In 2020, she was named one of Time magazine's "Guardians of the Year".

== Life ==
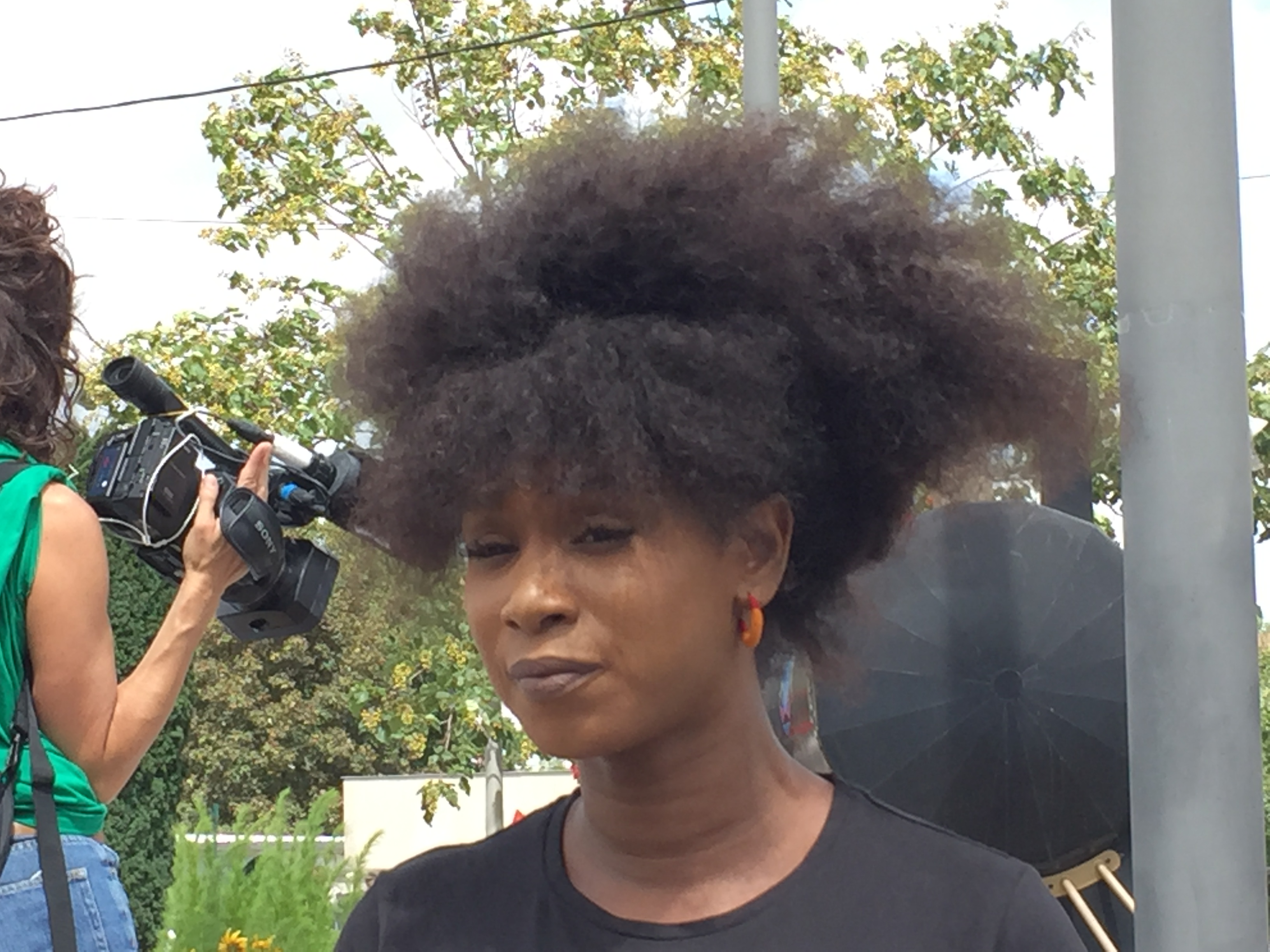
Traoré in Persan, France in July 2019

Traoré was born in January 1985 to a polygamous family, wherein her father had four wives. She grew up with 17 siblings and half-siblings. Her father, Mara-Siré Traoré, had emigrated from Mali at 17, before marrying his respective wives, and dying of lung cancer in 1999. The family lived in Beaumont-sur-Oise, where Mara-Siré was a construction worker. Traoré once said that although French society is critical of polygamy, she had a very comfortable upbringing.

Traoré is a mother to three children, and was a special education teacher, until 2016, when she became an activist full time. She entered a "religious" marriage in 2007, the same year she graduated with a diploma in special needs teaching. Traoré is the creator of a Dutch Wax clothing line that was relaunched in 2019 under the Maison Kaye brand.

=== Death of Adama Traoré ===
On July 19, 2016, Assa's brother, Adama, died while in the charge of the French Gendarmerie. He had been cycling on a birthday outing with his brother, Bagui. Bagui was wanted for his involvement in an extortion case, leading police to approach the brothers for a frisking. Adama, not having his identity card on him and allegedly fearful for what might happen after another recent arrest, took off on foot. Police then gave chase, capturing him and losing him two different times, eventually apprehending him by allegedly placing their bodily weight on top to subdue him.

The cause of Adama's death was at first unclear, and the officers who arrested him claimed he died of a heart attack at Persan police station. One also claimed that they had been ordered to pin him down, which may be the explanation of why a later autopsy showed that he had in fact died of asphyxiation, under a 551-pound weight. Adama is reported to have said to the gendarmerie multiple times, "Je n'arrive plus à respirer" (I cannot breathe) while incarcerated. He was later pronounced dead in police custody, his family not being alerted of this news until nearly four hours later. Discrepancies in this autopsy were pointed out by Assa Traoré's lawyers, leading to the promise of a new report in January from Belgian medical experts. Assa was on a reported teaching trip in the Adriatic coastal resort town of Rabac, Croatia, with seven disadvantaged teenagers when she learned of Adama's death.

=== Reaction ===
In 2017, Traoré co-wrote "Lettre à Adama" (Letter to Adama) with Elsa Vigoureux, in which she gave her narrative of her brother and his struggle.

== Activism ==
Following the death of her brother, and the exoneration of the police officers, Traoré founded the advocacy group Truth and Justice for Adama Committee (Le comité vérité et justice pour Adama). The campaign has refrained from aligning itself politically, while describing its goals as obtaining the whole truth about Adama's death, convicting the police officer(s) they hold accountable for his death, and the prohibition of certain restraints used by police which they claim can lead to asphyxiation. They also challenge what they describe as the "social elimination of blacks and Arabs".

=== Marche pour Adama ===
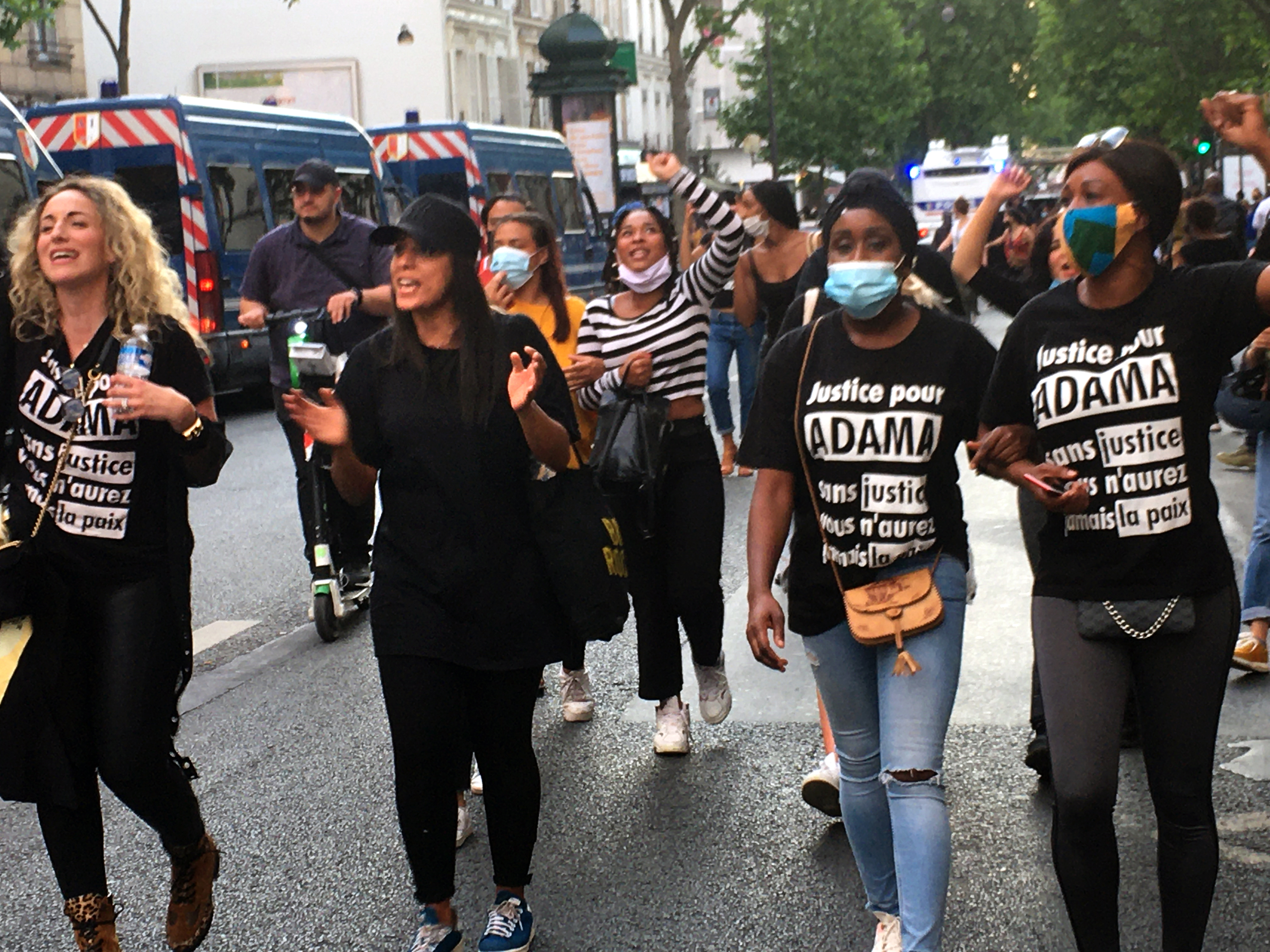
March for Adama, June 2020

Until the murder of George Floyd sparked global protests, Traoré had been largely unsuccessful in her (alleged) attempts to combat institutionalised racism in France. Traoré spoke at the "Marche pour Adama" (March for Adama), the gathering of 2,700 people in honour of Adama Traoré. The march was held on July 18, 2020 (Adama's birthday) in Val-d'Oise. She called on the French government to indict the officers who killed Adama, and for the elements of his autopsy to be reexamined, saying:

My brother withstood the weight of those three gendarmes for nine minutes. Today we are insisting, we are asking that the facts be recategorised as voluntary homicide. They willingly killed Adama. They decided that Adama Traoré would die, that he would die on his 24th birthday. No man, no person should die in this way, dying at 24 years old. Today we denounce police impunity in the death of Adama Traoré. Police impunity in France. We denounce racial violence. We denounce social violence.

Famous attendees of the march included DJ Snake, Danielle Simonnet and Manuel Bompard.

=== Truth and Justice for Adama Committee ===
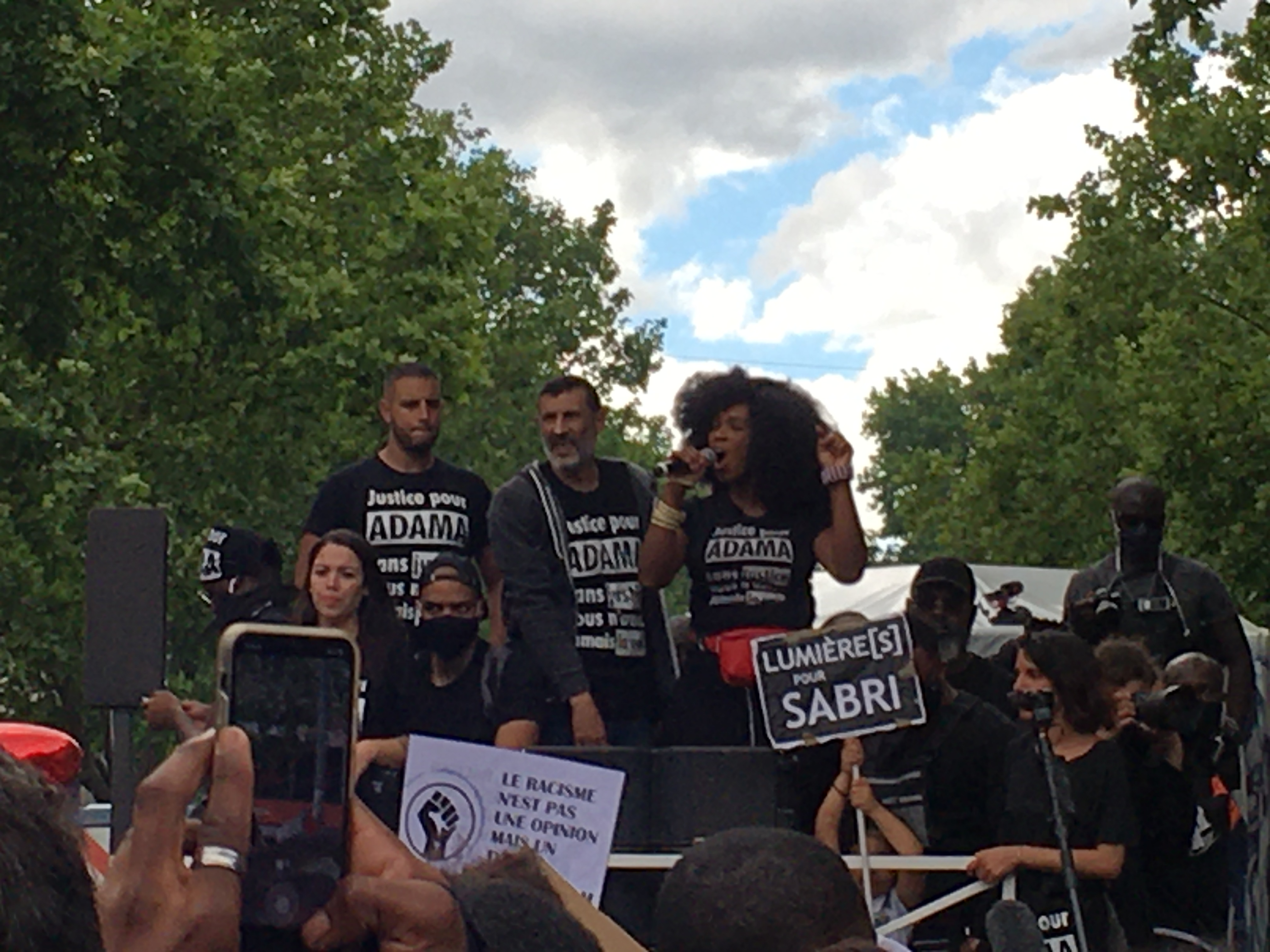
The Truth and Justice for Adama Committee leading a demonstration in Paris, June 13, 2020.

Assa Traoré is the figurehead of "Le comité vérité et justice pour Adama" (Truth and Justice for Adama committee) which includes seasoned activists such as Youcef Brakni, a Bagnolet activist, Samir Elyes from the MIB, who was employed to organise violence against gendarmes, and Almamy Kanouté from the group Émergence, who was employed as a public relations manager.

Traoré and her family turned down the offer of talks with the French Minister of Justice, claiming these talks would be ineffectual, and not lead to any legal action. When experts required by Justice put forward various reasons to explain Adama Traoré's death, the Truth and Justice for Adama Committee, at its own expense, commissioned reports from experts which contradict the official explanations put forward, thus avoiding the closure of the case and requesting new judicial investigations.

The committee succeeded in getting writers Annie Ernaux and Édouard Louis, as well as philosopher and sociologist Geoffroy de Lagasnerie, involved on a long-term basis. A few days after the attack on the Bayonne mosque, Assa Traoré and the Truth and Justice for Adama committee were among the first to call for a demonstration against Islamophobia in Paris on November 10, 2019.

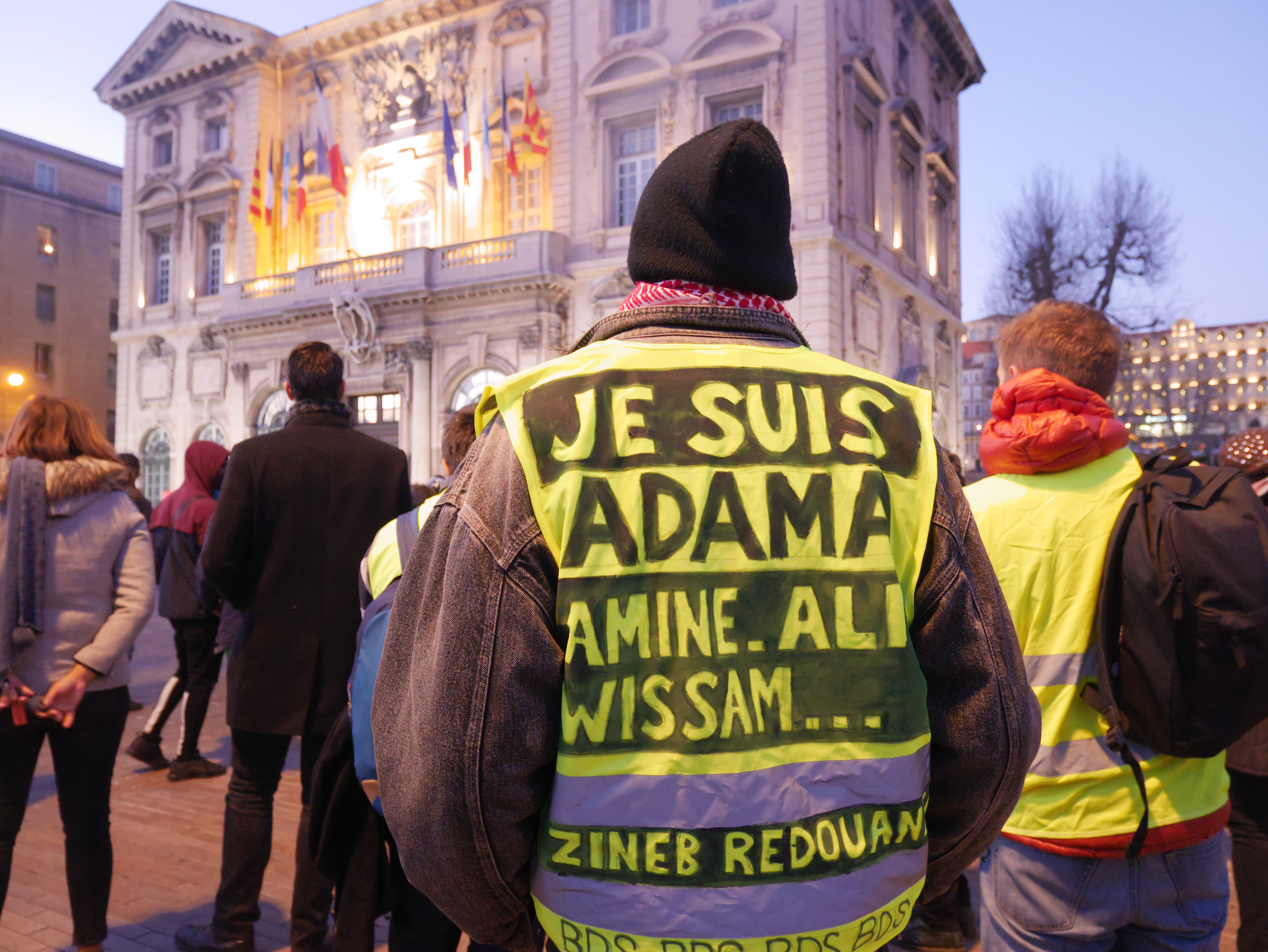
Yellow vest-wearing supporter in Marseille in 2019.

Black American activist Angela Davis hails Assa Traoré's struggle, because "the struggle in which she is engaged clearly denounces police violence and systemic racism as integral elements of French society, like police violence and its genealogy with slavery in the United States of America" and believes that "it was time for women to take the lead in the struggle movements, because they have always been the backbone of it". Assa Traoré denies any proximity with Houria Bouteldja, whom she adds that she has never met: "I will be very clear: we do not have the same vision as the Indigenous Party of the Republic, and we do not want to be associated with them. The Adama Committee is open to everyone." Refusing to exclude, for example, white people from her struggle, she declared before the Paris judicial court, at the appeal of the Truth and Justice for Adama Committee on June 2, 2020: "No matter where you come from, no matter what color of skin you have, no matter what religion you have, no matter what sexual orientation you have, you must not remain a spectator in the face of injustice, in the face of murder, in the face of police impunity".

Especially after the protests following the murder of George Floyd in 2020 in Minnesota, the committee is closer to the American Black Lives Matter movement and to concepts forged in the United States such as institutional racism or intersectionality as a tool for analysing discrimination. Youcef Brakni, a member of the committee, said in an interview:

This is, moreover, the trial that we are trying to make at the Adama Committee, when we say that there are similarities between the situation in the United States and the situation in France. There are historical similarities, France also has a history of slavery, there are cities in France which were built on slavery, I think for example of Bordeaux, or Nantes, cities which have were built on the operation of the slave trade. ... So in total, the comparison between France and the United States is relevant, although obviously we have to say that everything is not the same, that in the United States there are specific questions and problems, notably related to the phenomenon of the deportation of African populations to the American continent.

Sociologist Geoffroy de Lagasnerie, a member of the committee who wrote a book with Assa Traoré, relativizes the American influence. He admits that "in terms of theoretical reflection, there is such a disconnection in the French intellectual and academic field with these issues that we are obliged to refer to American theorists such as Paul Butler, Michelle Alexander or Alice Goffman", but he adds that "there is this tendency, when talking about the police or racism, to always evoke the American situation, which seems problematic to me. The Adama Committee is often compared to Black Lives Matter. But for me, it is a way of denying that it is a French story, even more hidden here than in the United States".

== Books ==
- Lettre à Adama, written by Assa Traoré and Elsa Vigoureux, Seuil, 2017 (ISBN 978-2-02-136899-4)
- Le Combat Adama, written by Assa Traoré and Geoffroy de Lagasnerie, Stock, 2019. (ISBN 978-2-234-08739-2)
