= Charles H. Rammelkamp Jr. =

American scientist and physician

Charles H. Rammelkamp, Jr.
- Born: May 24, 1911; Jacksonville, Illinois
- Died: December 5, 1981 (aged 70); Cleveland, Ohio
- Citizenship: USA
- Education: Illinois College, B.A. (1933); University of Chicago, M.D., (1937).
- Known for: Isolating streptococcus as the cause of rheumatic fever and nephritic syndrome.
- Spouse: Helen Chisholm
- Children: Charles H., III, Colin C. Anne R. (Davies).
- Awards: Lasker Award (1954)
- Scientific career
- Fields: Infectious diseases and epidemiology
- Workplaces: Western Reserve University School of Medicine

Charles Henry "Rammel" Rammelkamp Jr. (May 24, 1911 – December 5, 1981) was an American scientist and physician. Rammelkamp Jr. discovered that streptococcus can cause rheumatic fever and nephritic syndrome, for which, he received the Lasker Award. He was a longtime professor at Case Western Reserve University School of Medicine.

== Early life and education ==
Rammelkamp Jr. was born in Jacksonville, Illinois on May 24, 1911. He had a sister and two brothers. His father, Charles H. Rammelkamp was an academic administrator. Rammelkamp Jr. earned a Bachelor of Arts at Illinois College in 1933. He completed a doctor of medicine from University of Chicago in 1937. Rammelkamp Jr. was an intern in medicine at Barnes Hospital in St. Louis from 1937 to 1938. He completed an internship in surgery at Billings Memorial Hospital from 1938 to 1939.

== Career ==
In 1939, Rammelkamp Jr. was an assistant in medicine at Washington University in St. Louis. From 1939 to 1940, he was a research fellow in medicine at the Thorndike Memorial Laboratory under Chester Keefer. He was an instructor of medicine at Boston University from 1940 to 1946. Rammelkamp Jr. served as a member of the United States Army commission on acute respiratory distress syndrome during World War II. In 1946, Rammelkamp Jr. became an assistant professor of medicine and preventative medicine at Case Western Reserve University School of Medicine. He was promoted to associate professor of preventative medicine (1947 to 1960) and later professor of medicine 1950 to 1960. He was professor of preventative medicine from 1960 to 1980.

In 1952, Rammelkamp Jr. and John Holmes Dingle discovered that streptococcus can cause rheumatic fever and nephritic syndrome. Rammelkamp Jr. received a Lasker Award for his research.

== Personal life ==
Rammelkamp Jr. was known as Rammel by friends and acquaintances. He was married to Helen Chisholm and had three children. Rammelkamp Jr. died in Cleveland on December 5, 1981.
