= National Institute of Allergy and Infectious Diseases =

US federal research institute

Institute overview
- Formed: December 29, 1955; 70 years ago
- Preceding Institute: National Microbiological Institute
- Jurisdiction: United States Government
- Headquarters: North Bethesda, Maryland, US (Rockville, Maryland, mailing address)
- Institute executive: John Powers III, Director
- Parent department: Health and Human Services
- Parent Institute: National Institutes of Health
- Website: niaid.nih.gov

The National Institute of Allergy and Infectious Diseases (NIAID, /ˈnaɪ.æd/) is one of the 27 institutes and centers that make up the National Institutes of Health (NIH), an agency of the United States Department of Health and Human Services. NIAID conducts and supports basic and applied research to better understand, treat, and prevent infectious, immunologic, and allergic diseases.

NIAID has on-campus laboratories in Maryland and Hamilton, Montana, and funds research conducted by scientists at institutions in the United States and throughout the world. NIAID also works closely with partners in academia, industry, government, and non-governmental organizations in multifaceted and multidisciplinary efforts to address emerging health challenges such as the H1N1/09 pandemic and the COVID-19 pandemic.

== History ==
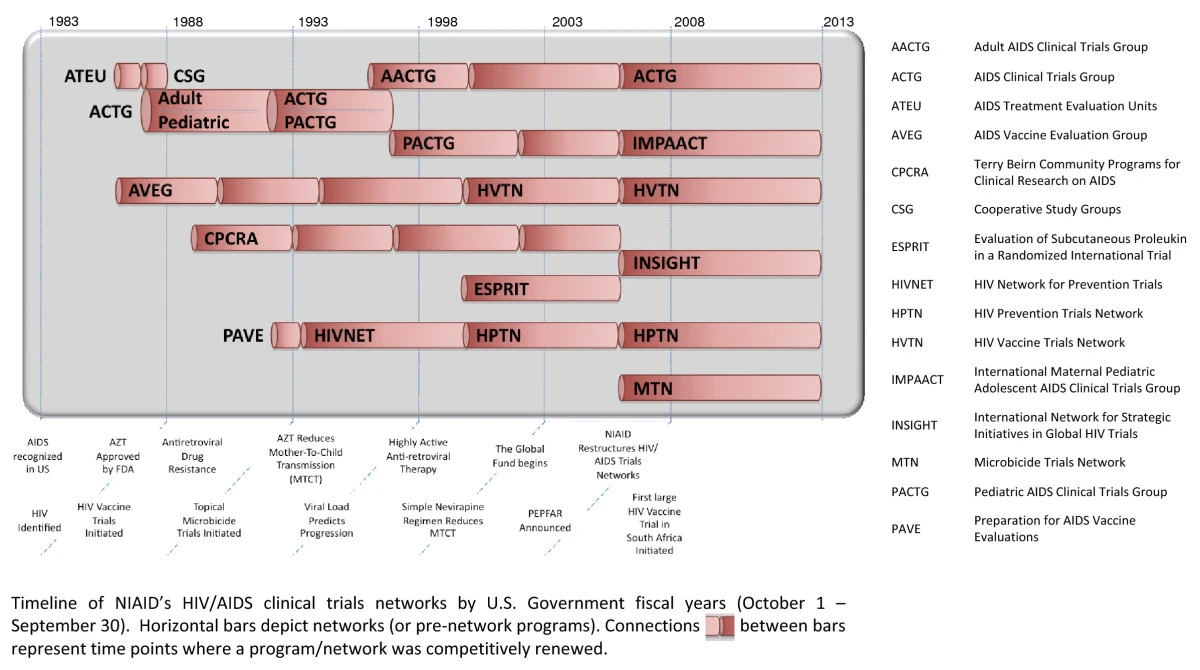
History of NIAID HIV/AIDS clinical trial networks from 1983 to 2018

NIAID traces its origins to a small laboratory established in 1887 at the Marine Hospital on Staten Island, New York, (now Bayley Seton Hospital). Officials of the Marine Hospital Service in New York decided to open a research laboratory to study the link between microscopic organisms and infectious diseases. Joseph J. Kinyoun, a medical officer with the Marine Hospital Service, was selected to create this laboratory, which he called a "laboratory of hygiene".

Kinyoun's lab was renamed the Hygienic Laboratory in 1891 and moved to Washington, D.C., where Congress authorized it to investigate "infectious and contagious diseases and matters pertaining to the public health." With the passage of the Ransdell Act in 1930, the Hygienic Laboratory became the National Institute of Health. In 1937, the Rocky Mountain Laboratory, then part of the United States Public Health Service, was transferred to Division of Infectious Diseases, part of the NIH.

In mid-1948, the National Institute of Health became the National Institutes of Health (NIH) with the creation of four new institutes. On October 8, 1948, the Rocky Mountain Laboratory and the Biologics Control Laboratory were joined with the NIH Division of Infectious Diseases and Division of Tropical Diseases to form the National Microbiological Institute. In 1955, Congress changed the name of the National Microbiological Institute to the National Institute of Allergy and Infectious Diseases to reflect the inclusion of allergy and immunology research. That change became effective on December 29, 1955.

In January 2023, the Department of Health and Human Services Office of Inspector General reported deficiencies in the National Institutes of Health's oversight of EcoHealth Alliance research grants, including subawards to the Wuhan Institute of Virology. The report also recommended that NIH assess whether NIAID staff were following its procedures for reviewing research involving enhanced potential pandemic pathogens.

In May 2024, a House subcommittee investigating the COVID-19 pandemic questioned former NIAID senior adviser David Morens about his use of personal email for government business and his handling of federal records. In April 2025, the National Institutes of Health suspended research at NIAID's Integrated Research Facility at Fort Detrick, Maryland. NIH described the suspension as a safety stand-down, citing documented problems involving contract staff that it said had compromised the facility's safety culture. In August 2026, Morens pleaded guilty to conspiracy to commit offenses against and defraud the United States in connection with using personal email to conceal government communications about coronavirus research grants from public disclosure.

=== List of directors ===
The following have been directors of the National Institute of Allergy and Infectious Diseases:

Denotes service as acting director

No.	Portrait	Director	Took office	Left office	Refs.
1		Victor H. Haas	November 1, 1948	April 1957	
2		Justin M. Andrews	April 1957	October 1, 1964	
3		Dorland J. Davis	October 1, 1964	August 1, 1975	
Acting		John R. Seal	August 2, 1975	October 1975	
4		Richard M. Krause	October 1975	July 6, 1984	
Acting		Bernard Talbot	July 7, 1984	November 1, 1984	
5		Anthony Fauci	November 2, 1984	December 31, 2022	
Acting		Hugh Auchincloss	January 1, 2023	September 24, 2023	
6		Jeanne Marrazzo	September 24, 2023	April 24, 2025	
Acting		Jeffery Taubenberger	April 24, 2025	May 2026	
Acting		John Powers III	June 9, 2026	present	

== Organizational structure ==
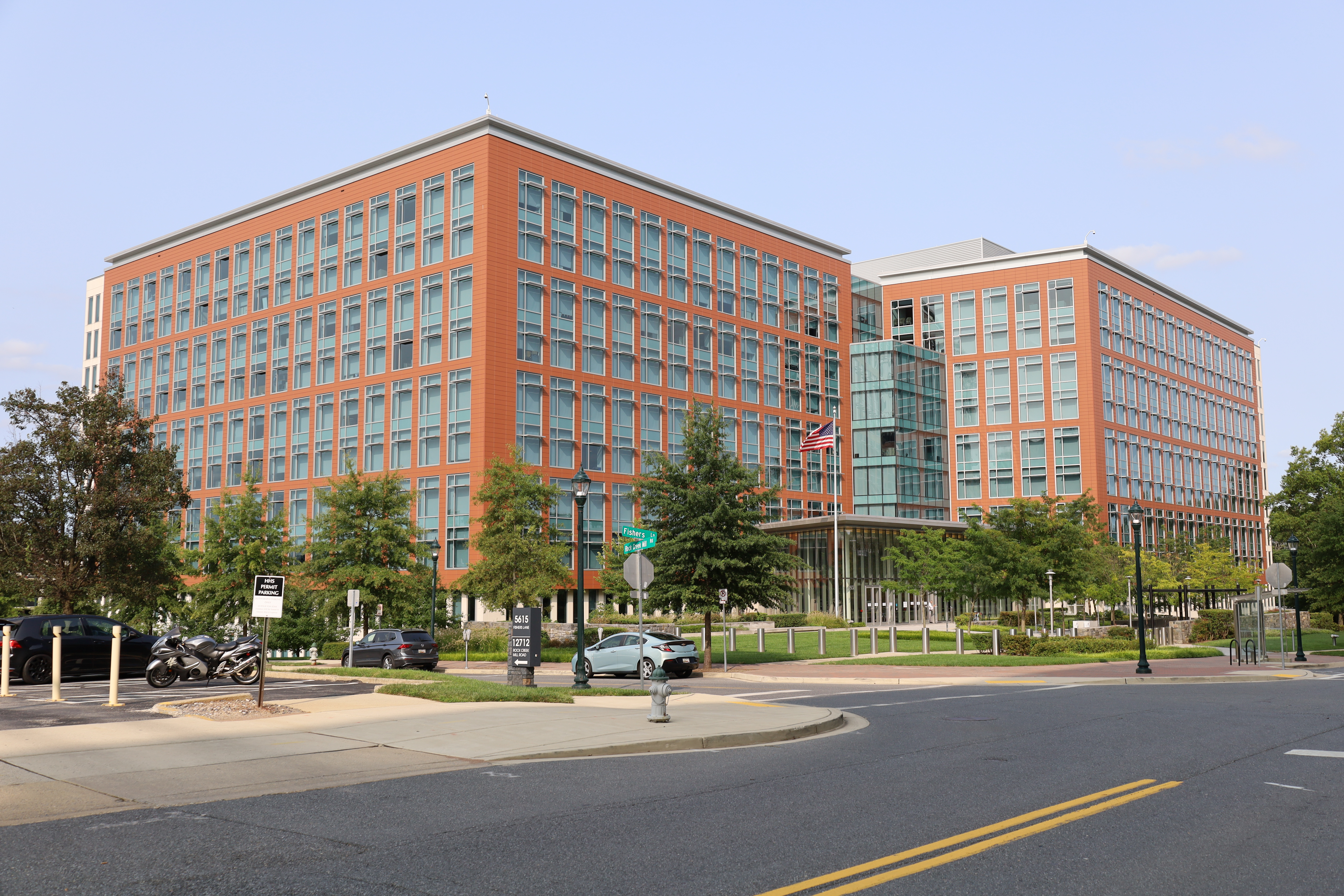
NIAID building in North Bethesda, Maryland

NIAID is composed of the Office of the Director (OD), four extramural divisions:

1. Division of Acquired Immunodeficiency Syndrome (DAIDS)
2. Division of Allergy, Immunology, and Transplantation (DAIT)
3. Division of Microbiology and Infectious Diseases (DMID)
4. Division of Extramural Activities (DEA)

and three intramural divisions:

1. Division of Clinical Research (DCR)
2. Division of Intramural Research (DIR)
3. Vaccine Research Center (VRC)

The Dale and Betty Bumpers Vaccine Research Center is composed of four laboratories and two programs:

- Immunology Laboratory
- Viral Pathogenesis Laboratory
- Virology Laboratory
- Vaccine Production Program Laboratory
- Clinical Trials Program
- Translational Research Program

== Research priorities ==
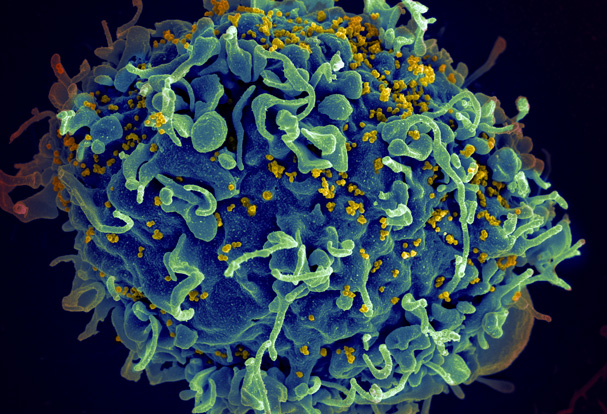
HIV-infected T cell

NIAID's research priorities are focused on:

1. "expanding the breadth and depth of knowledge in all areas of infectious, immunologic, and allergic diseases"
2. "developing flexible domestic and international research capacities to respond appropriately to emerging and re-emerging disease threats wherever they may occur."

NIAID's mission areas are:

Human Immunodeficiency Virus/Acquired Immunodeficiency Syndrome (HIV/AIDS)
The goals in this area are finding a cure for HIV-infected individuals; developing preventive strategies, including vaccines and treatment as prevention; developing therapeutic strategies for preventing and treating co-infections such as TB and hepatitis C in HIV-infected individuals; and addressing the long-term consequences of HIV treatment.
Biodefense and Emerging Infectious Diseases (BioD)
The goals of this mission area are to better understand how these deliberately emerging (i.e., intentionally caused) and naturally emerging infectious agents cause disease and how the immune system responds to them.
Infectious and Immunologic Diseases (IID)
The goal of this mission area is to understand how aberrant responses of the immune system play a critical role in the development of immune-related disorders such as asthma, allergies, autoimmune diseases, and transplant rejection. This research helps improve the understanding of how the immune system functions when it is healthy or unhealthy and provides the basis for development of new diagnostic tools and interventions for immune-related diseases.

== Achievements ==
NIAID collaborations with various partners led to the development of FDA-approved vaccines for influenza (FluMist), hepatitis A (Havrix), and rotavirus (RotaShield). NIAID also was instrumental in the development and licensure of acellular pertussis vaccines, conjugate vaccines for Streptococcus pneumoniae and Haemophilus influenzae type b or Hib, and a preventive therapy for respiratory syncytial virus or RSV (Synagis). Additionally, NIAID partnerships with industry and academia have led to the advancement of diagnostic tests for several important infectious diseases, including malaria (ParaSight F), tuberculosis (GeneXpert MTB/RIF), and norovirus (Ridascreen Norovirus 3rd Generation EIA).

NIAID has done research on mother-to-child transmission (MTCT) of HIV. In 1994, a study co-sponsored by NIAID demonstrated that the drug AZT, given to HIV-infected women who had little or no prior antiretroviral therapy (ART), reduced the risk of MTCT by two-thirds.

In 1999, an NIAID-funded study in Uganda found that two oral doses of the inexpensive drug nevirapine—one given to HIV-infected mothers at the onset of labor and another to their infants soon after birth—reduced MTCT by half when compared with a similar course of AZT. Subsequent clinical trials, including some funded by NIAID, showed that AIDS drugs also can reduce the risk of MTCT through breast milk. These and other studies have led to World Health Organization recommendations that can help prevent MTCT while allowing women in resource-limited settings to breastfeed their infants safely.

More recently, NIAID-funded scientists found that testing at-risk infants for HIV and then giving ART immediately to those who test positive dramatically reduces rates of illness and death. HIV-infected infants were four times less likely to die if given ART immediately after they were diagnosed with HIV, when compared with the standard of care (beginning ART in infants when they showed signs of HIV illness or a weakened immune system).

This finding helped influence the World Health Organization (WHO) to change its guidelines for treating HIV-infected infants. The guidelines now strongly recommend starting ART in all children under age 2 immediately after they have been diagnosed with HIV, regardless of their health status.

NIAID HIV Language Guide, 2024

In 2020, the NIAID Office of Communications & Government Relations' News & Science Writing Branch published an HIV Language Guide, "designed to help NIAID staff communicate with empowering rather than stigmatizing language" and it was quickly recognized that it has value beyond NIAID. A draft of the 2024 update was widely circulated, to incorporate feedback from community groups and was published in April 2024 using person-first language, but was removed from the NIAID website shortly after the second inauguration of Donald Trump in January 2025, with some commentators suggesting this is as a result of language in the guide around transgender and gender nonconforming people being in contravention of President Trump's executive order "Defending Women from Gender Ideology Extremism and Restoring Biological Truth to the Federal Government".

In 2023, NIAID Office of Data Science and Emerging Technologies (ODSET) created the NIAID Data Discovery Portal to enhance the reuse of data and enable faster development of diagnostics, therapeutics, and vaccines. The NIAID Data Discovery Portal focuses on the findability of data, aggregating resources across numerous sources, including NIAID-supported repositories and general biomedical repositories.

== Clinical training programs ==
NIAID offers three-year fellowships for medical trainees in allergy/immunology and infectious diseases. These Accreditation Council for Graduate Medical Education (ACGME)-accredited fellowships provide intensive clinical training and research mentorship in clinical and basic science laboratories.

=== Allergy and immunology ===
The Allergy and Immunology Clinical Fellowship Program is open to physicians who are on track to complete an approved internal medicine or pediatric medicine residency program.

=== Infectious diseases ===
The Infectious Diseases Fellowship Program is open to physicians who have completed three years of an internal medicine residency program in the United States or Canada.

== See also ==
- Pathema
