= Laurie Glimcher =

American immunologist (born 1951)

- Born: 1951 (age 74–75)
- Education: Radcliffe College (BS); Harvard University (MD)
- Spouse(s): Hugh Auchincloss (m. 1973, divorced) Gregory Petsko
- Children: 3, including Jake Auchincloss
- Father: Melvin J. Glimcher
- Awards: William B. Coley Award (2012)
- Scientific career
- Fields: Cancer immunotherapy
- Workplaces: Harvard Medical School; Dana–Farber Cancer Institute

Laurie Hollis Glimcher (born 1951) is an American physician-scientist and former President and CEO of Dana–Farber Cancer Institute. She was elected a member of the American Philosophical Society in 2019. In October 2024, Glimcher stepped down as President and CEO of Dana-Farber.

== Education ==
Glimcher graduated from the Winsor School, an all-girls private school in Boston, Massachusetts, in 1968. In 1972, she graduated magna cum laude from Radcliffe College, and then graduated cum laude from Harvard Medical School in 1976.

== Work ==
She joined the board of directors of Bristol-Myers Squibb in 1997 and retired from the board in 2017. In 2017, she joined the board of GlaxoSmithKline. Her research laboratory received funding from Merck & Co for a project focused on developing new therapies for the treatment of osteoporosis in 2008.

From 1991 to 2012, Glimcher was the Irene Heinz Given Professor of Immunology at the Harvard School of Public Health, a professor of medicine at Harvard Medical School. Clinically, she is a specialist in rheumatology.

From 2012 to 2016, Glimcher served as the Stephen and Suzanne Weiss Dean of Weill Cornell Medical College and the Cornell University Provost for Medical Affairs.

In February 2016, Laurie Glimcher was named the president and CEO of Dana–Farber Cancer Institute. Glimcher was considered for the position for the Dean of Harvard Medical School but turned the position down in order to become the president of the Dana–Farber Cancer Institute.

At Dana-Farber, Glimcher collaborated on research to find methods of combatting cancer from within the human immune system.The Dana–Farber Cancer Institute is an institution that is affiliated with Harvard, as it currently is one of its teaching hospitals. Glimcher, who was the first female dean of any medical school in New York state, became the first female to lead the Dana–Farber Cancer Institute.

In 2017, she joined the board of GlaxoSmithKline. In 2020, she joined the board of Analog Devices. She has retired from both boards.

In October 2024, Glimcher stepped down as president and CEO of Dana-Farber after eight years as president and CEO, citing her age (73) and the fact that she had successfully steered the Dana-Farber through the COVID crisis and obtained governmental approval of the building of a new, 300-bed, dedicated cancer hospital in collaboration with Beth Israel Deaconess Medical Center. Under Glimcher’s leadership, the Dana-Farber Cancer Institute’s regional locations grew from four to seven, and there was a 51% growth in patient volume and a 62% increase in grant and industry-funded research support, totaling $450 million in FY23. She also led The Dana-Farber Campaign, the most ambitious fundraising effort in the history of the Institute which will close at the end of September exceeding its original goal and providing critical funds in support of groundbreaking science, innovative new therapies, and institutional initiatives.

In 2025, the Dana-Farber established the Laurie H. Glimcher, MD, Chair, an endowed position honoring her as the Institute’s seventh president and CEO. This endowment "celebrates Glimcher’s significant contributions to cancer science and medicine and ensures the pursuit of innovative and groundbreaking advancements in cancer research. A generous group of Trustees, colleagues, friends, and supporters contributed over $3 million to establish the chair and commemorate Glimcher’s legacy."

== Research ==
Glimcher's research has focused on the molecular regulation of immunity and the interface between immune function and other tissues (notably bone and liver).

=== Transcriptional control of lymphocyte differentiation ===
Glimcher contributed to the identification of NK1.1, an alloantigen that became an important marker for NK and NKT cell populations.

Glimcher's laboratory discovered T-bet (TBX21) in 2000. T-bet was identified as a T-box transcription factor selectively associated with TH1 differentiation and shown to activate IFN-γ expression while repressing the opposing TH2 cytokine program. Ectopic expression of T-bet could redirect polarized TH2 and TC2 cells toward TH1- and TC1-like phenotypes, respectively.

Subsequent work demonstrated that T-bet has functions extending beyond CD4 T-cell differentiation. It regulates type 1 immune responses in multiple adaptive and innate immune populations, including CD8 T cells, NKT cells, B cells, NK cells and dendritic cells.

T-bet was also implicated in inflammatory disease. Mice lacking T-bet developed spontaneous airway inflammation and physiological changes resembling features of human asthma, supporting a role for T-bet in regulating airway inflammatory responses. Variants in the human TBX21 locus were subsequently associated with asthma and airway hyperresponsiveness, although the authors noted that further studies were needed to establish the generality of these associations.

In intestinal inflammation, Glimcher and colleagues showed that T-bet deficiency in the innate immune system caused spontaneous, transmissible ulcerative colitis. The phenotype involved altered dendritic-cell cytokine production and changes in the intestinal microbial community, linking T-bet-dependent transcriptional regulation to host–microbiota homeostasis.

Glimcher laboratory investigated the atypical kinase RIOK2 in hematopoietic differentiation. Loss of Riok2 in mice caused anemia and myeloproliferation, while increased IL-22 signaling contributed to impaired erythropoiesis; blocking IL-22 signaling alleviated the erythroid defect.

In human hematopoietic stem and progenitor cells, RIOK2 was subsequently identified as a transcriptional regulator of lineage commitment. It promotes erythroid differentiation while suppressing megakaryocytic and myeloid differentiation, in part through regulation of key hematopoietic transcription factors including GATA1, GATA2, SPI1, RUNX3 and KLF1.

=== XBP1 and the unfolded protein response ===
Glimcher's laboratory helped establish the role of the transcription factor XBP1 in secretory-cell differentiation and metabolism. Her group showed that XBP1 is required for plasma cell differentiation and for the expansion of the endoplasmic reticulum and secretory machinery needed for sustained immunoglobulin production.

The laboratory subsequently showed that XBP1 also has a metabolic function in the liver, where it is induced by dietary carbohydrates and promotes expression of genes involved in de novo fatty-acid synthesis. Liver-specific deletion of XBP1 reduced hepatic lipid production and caused marked hypocholesterolemia and hypotriglyceridemia.

More recent work from Glimcher and colleagues has extended the IRE1α–XBP1 pathway to innate lymphocyte biology. IRE1α and XBP1 promote the expansion and effector function of NK cells, including responses to viral infection and tumors, through an IRE1α–XBP1–c-Myc axis that also supports oxidative phosphorylation.

=== Osteobiology: Schnurri-3 and bone-mass regulation ===
Glimcher's laboratory identified Schnurri-3 as an important regulator of adult bone formation. Mice lacking Shn3 develop increased bone mass and osteosclerosis because of enhanced osteoblast activity; SHN3 promotes degradation of RUNX2, a major regulator of osteoblast differentiation.

Subsequent studies showed that SHN3 acts as a negative regulator of ERK signaling downstream of WNT in osteoblasts. Inducible reduction of SHN3 in adult mice increased bone mass, providing preclinical evidence that the SHN3 pathway could be targeted to enhance bone formation.

=== Metabolism, endoplasmic-reticulum stress and disease ===
Glimcher's work on XBP1 helped establish a mechanistic connection between the unfolded protein response, cellular secretory capacity and metabolism. In particular, the discovery that XBP1 regulates hepatic lipogenesis expanded the known functions of UPR transcription factors beyond proteostasis and provided a framework for studying their involvement in metabolic disease.

=== Cancer immunology and translational research ===
Glimcher's later work has increasingly examined transcriptional and stress-response pathways that regulate immune-cell function in cancer. Her group's studies of the IRE1α–XBP1 pathway demonstrated that endoplasmic-reticulum stress signaling can influence NK-cell proliferation, metabolism and anti-tumor responses.

In 2026, Glimcher and colleagues reported that salt-inducible kinases SIK2 and SIK3 promote T-cell dysfunction in the immunosuppressive microenvironment of high-grade serous ovarian carcinoma. Human T cells exposed to patient ascites expressed high levels of SIK2, SIK3 and the upstream kinase LKB1, while pharmacological or genetic inhibition of SIK2/3 enhanced T-cell effector responses.

In mouse models of resistant ovarian cancer, genetic ablation or pharmacological inhibition of SIKs reduced disease progression and improved survival, while combining SIK inhibition with PD-1 checkpoint blockade produced an additional survival benefit. Mechanistically, T-cell-intrinsic SIK2/3 signaling promoted immunosuppression in part through TXNIP induction and suppression of LYST, whereas SIK inhibition increased T-cell infiltration, cytotoxicity and IFN-γ production and shifted the tumor microenvironment toward an immunostimulatory state.

These findings identify SIK2 and SIK3 as potential therapeutic targets for overcoming T-cell immunosuppression in ovarian cancer and provide preclinical support for SIK inhibition as an immunotherapeutic strategy.

== Awards and memberships ==
Glimcher received the L'Oréal-UNESCO Awards for Women in Science in 2014 for her work in the field of immunology and her research regarding the control of immune responses. In 2014, she received the Margaret Kripke Legend Award. She received the Steven C. Beering Award in 2015. In 2018, she received the American Association of Immunologists Lifetime Achievement Award.

She has been elected to the National Academy of Sciences, the National Academy of Medicine, the American Academy of Arts and Sciences and the American Philosophical Society. She is a member of American Academy of Arts and Sciences, American Association of Immunologists, American Society for Clinical Investigation, American Association of Physicians, and American Association for the Advancement of Science. She was the president of the American Association of Immunologists from 2003 to 2004.

In 2020 she was named the newest member of the Stand Up to Cancer Scientific Advisory Committee. Glimcher served on the Board of Directors of Break Through Cancer from 2021 to 2024.

== Media ==
In 2015, Glimcher was targeted by animal rights activists over their protest of withdrawal of support for chimpanzees in Liberia by the New York Blood Center where Glimcher had been on the board for two years.

Glimcher's dual role as Dana-Farber CEO and director of multiple corporate boards was highlighted in a The Boston Globe Spotlight article and resulted in calls from some Harvard physicians and Boston hospital staff for the prohibition of hospital executives from serving on corporate boards.

In 2024, Dana–Farber Cancer Institute reviewed more than 50 papers co-authored by various Dana-Farber faculty after questions were raised about image presentation. The review led to several retractions and corrections, including one voluntary retraction of a paper on which Glimcher was senior author. Dana–Farber stated that the issues involved image preparation and did not necessarily imply scientific misconduct and emphasized that the underlying data remained valid.

== Family ==
Glimcher is the daughter of Geraldine Lee (Bogolub) and Melvin J. Glimcher, who was a pioneer in the development of artificial limbs while the chair of the Massachusetts General Hospital Orthopedics Department. Her family is Jewish.

Glimcher followed in the footsteps of her father by later becoming a full professor at Harvard Medical School at the age of 39; the two became research partners.

Glimcher was married to Hugh Auchincloss, who was the top deputy to Dr. Anthony Fauci, and prior to that was a chief of transplant surgery at Brigham & Women's Hospital, They had three children, Kalah, Hugh and Jake Auchincloss.

She is currently married to Gregory Petsko, Professor of Neurology in the Ann Romney Center for Neurologic Diseases at Harvard Medical School and Brigham and Women's Hospital, who was director of the Rosenstiel Basic Medical Sciences Research Center and chair of biochemistry at Brandeis University prior to moving to Weill Cornell Medicine, where he became director of the Helen and Robert Appel Alzheimer's Disease Research Institute. On October 24, 2023 he was awarded the National Medal of Science by President Joe Biden; the National Medal of Science is the nation’s highest scientific honor.

Her daughter, Kalah Auchincloss is the Co-Founder and President of Canal Row Advisors, which helps companies navigate the FDA's complexities. Before that she was a senior vice president of regulatory compliance and deputy general counsel for Greenleaf Health and previously was deputy chief of staff for two Food and Drug Administration commissioners. Her eldest son, Hugh Glimcher Auchincloss, is a thoracic surgeon at Massachusetts General Hospital. Her younger son, Jake Auchincloss, is a United State Congressman, the Representative for Massachusetts's 4th Congressional District.

== See also ==
- Dana-Farber Cancer Institute
