= Lorals =

American underwear brand

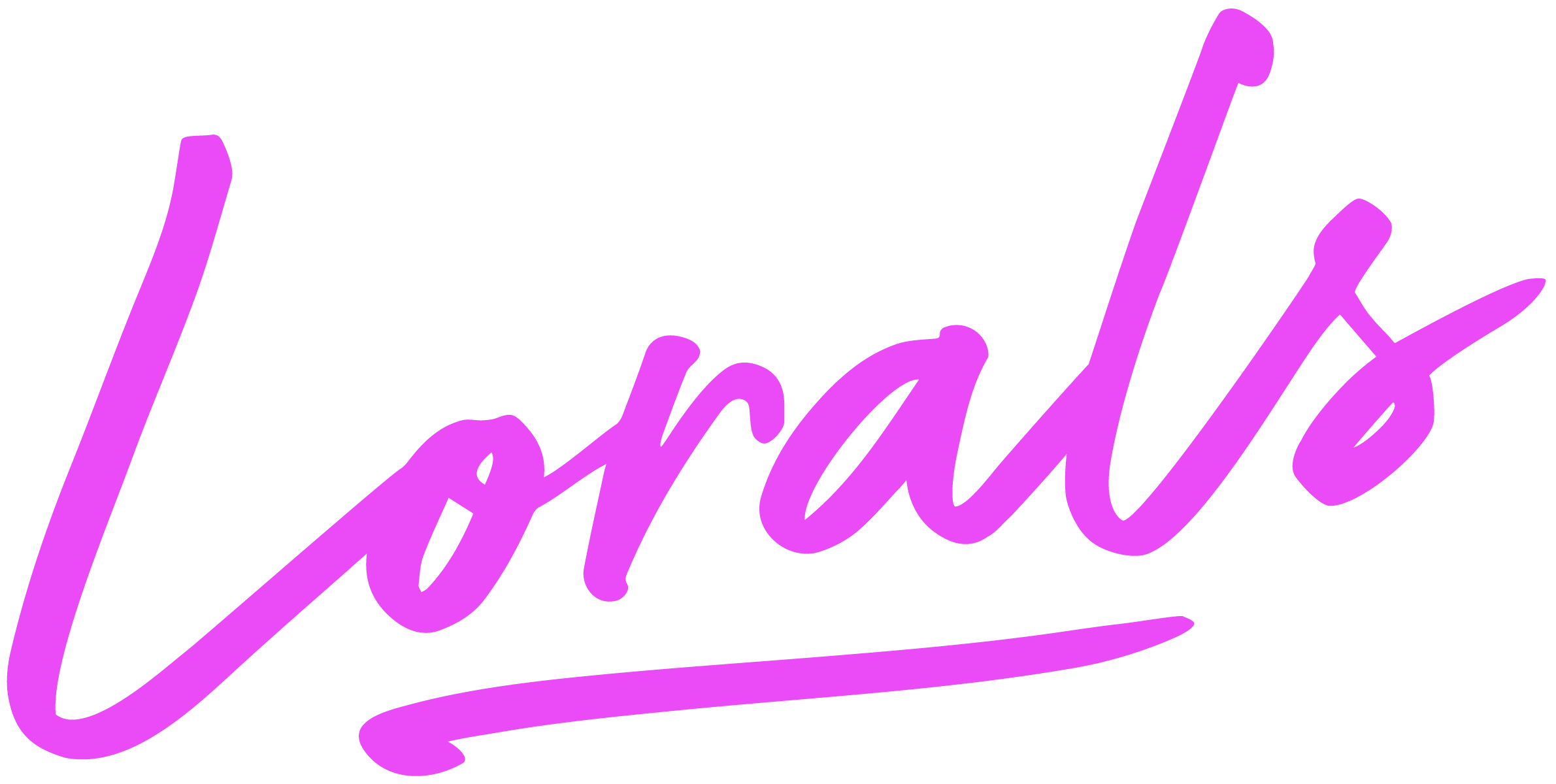
- Industry: Health and wellness; Sexual health
- Founded: 2018
- Founder: Melanie Cristol
- Headquarters: Los Angeles, California, U.S.
- Products: STI‑protective latex underwear
- Website: mylorals.com

Lorals is a brand of latex underwear designed for use during oral sex. In 2022, Lorals received U.S. Food and Drug Administration (FDA) clearance for protection against sexually transmitted infections during cunnilingus and anilingus.

== Products and FDA clearance ==
Lorals, invented by Los Angeles-based attorney Melanie Cristol, launched in 2018. Media coverage has described the product as being used during oral sex in situations involving menstruation, self-consciousness, facial hair, and sensitivity.

In 2022, the U.S. Food and Drug Administration granted Lorals 510(k) clearance to market the STI protection products as Class II medical devices. According to the FDA summary, the devices act as a physical barrier "to reduce the risk of STI transmission during oral-anal and oral-vaginal contact." The company holds U.S. and international design and utility patents covering the products.

== Business and operations ==
Lorals is certified as a women-owned, LGBTQ-owned, and disability-owned business enterprise. The company distributes its products internationally and produces videos related to sexual health.

== Recognition ==
The products have been photographed in Playboy and are visible in adult films. Lorals has received a PopSugar Wellness Award and was a finalist for Fast Company World Changing Ideas. Jeanne Marrazzo, later Director of NIH's National Institute of Allergy and Infectious Diseases (NIAID), told The New York Times that Lorals "basically eroticized protection, which is something that condom companies have struggled with for years."
