= YKL-05-099 =

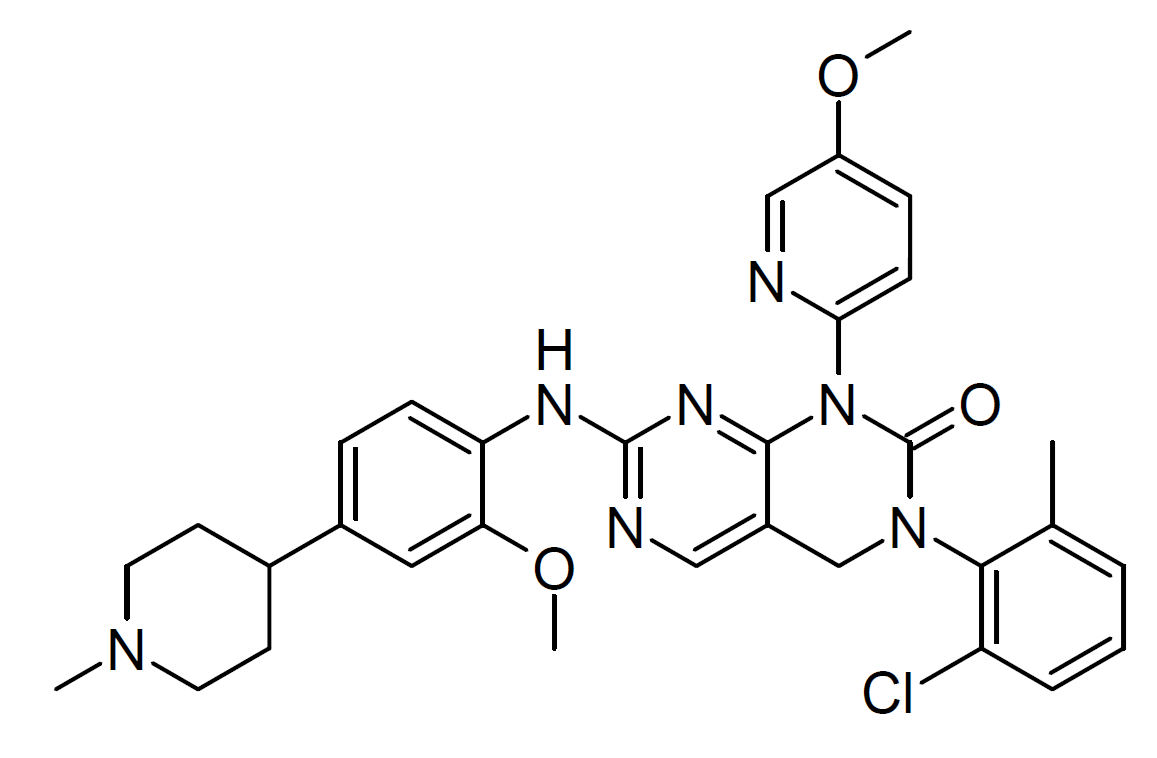

Identifiers
- IUPAC name: 3-(2-chloro-6-methylphenyl)-7-[2-methoxy-4-(1-methylpiperidin-4-yl)anilino]-1-(5-methoxypyridin-2-yl)-4H-pyrimido[4,5-d]pyrimidin-2-one
- CAS Number: 1936529-65-5
- PubChem CID: 121596782
- ChemSpider: 60598522
- ChEMBL: ChEMBL5209511

Chemical and physical data
- Formula: C_{32}H_{34}ClN_{7}O_{3}
- Molar mass: 600.12 g·mol^{−1}
- 3D model (JSmol): Interactive image
- SMILES: CC1=C(C(=CC=C1)Cl)N2CC3=CN=C(N=C3N(C2=O)C4=NC=C(C=C4)OC)NC5=C(C=C(C=C5)C6CCN(CC6)C)OC
- InChI: InChI=1S/C32H34ClN7O3/c1-20-6-5-7-25(33)29(20)39-19-23-17-35-31(37-30(23)40(32(39)41)28-11-9-24(42-3)18-34-28)36-26-10-8-22(16-27(26)43-4)21-12-14-38(2)15-13-21/h5-11,16-18,21H,12-15,19H2,1-4H3,(H,35,36,37); Key:VQINULODWGEVBB-UHFFFAOYSA-N

YKL-05-099 is an experimental drug which acts as an inhibitor of the salt-inducible kinase (SIK) enzymes. It has antiinflammatory effects and is used for research into the potential applications of salt-inducible kinase inhibitors in treating several conditions including leukemia, osteoporosis and obesity.
