= SIK3 =

Protein-coding gene in the species Homo sapiens

Identifiers
- Aliases: SIK3, QSK, SIK-3, L19, KIAA0999, SIK family kinase 3, SEMDK
- External IDs: OMIM: 614776; MGI: 2446296; GeneCards: SIK3
Enzyme activity
EC #	BRENDA	ExPASy	KEGG	MetaCyc
2.7.11.1	↗	↗	↗	↗

Gene location (Human)
Chr.	Chromosome 11 (human)
Band	11q23.3	Start	116,843,402 bp
Band	11q23.3	End	117,098,437 bp

Gene location (Mouse)
Chr.	Chromosome 9 (mouse)
Band	9|9 A5.2	Start	45,924,118 bp
Band	9|9 A5.2	End	46,135,492 bp
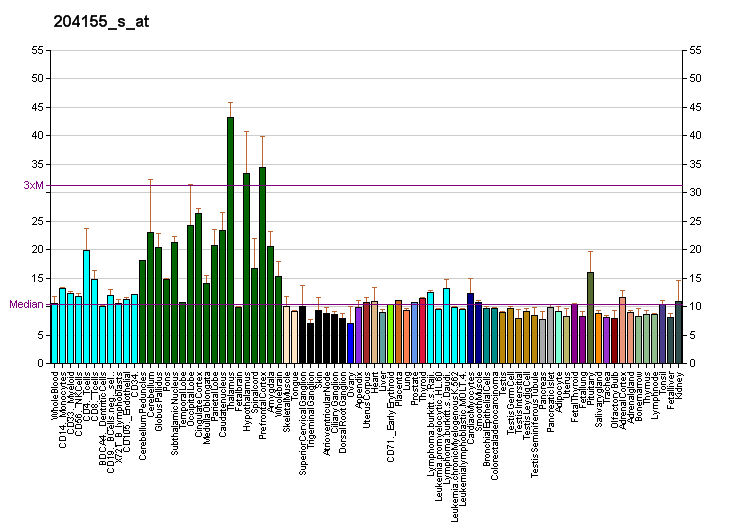

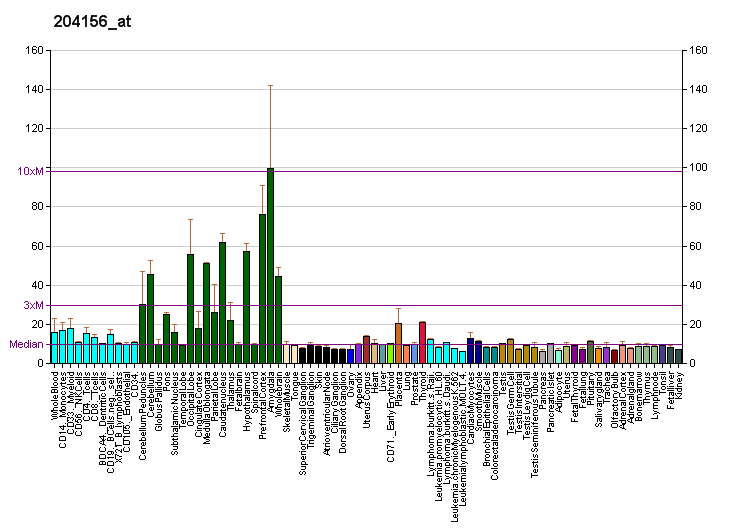

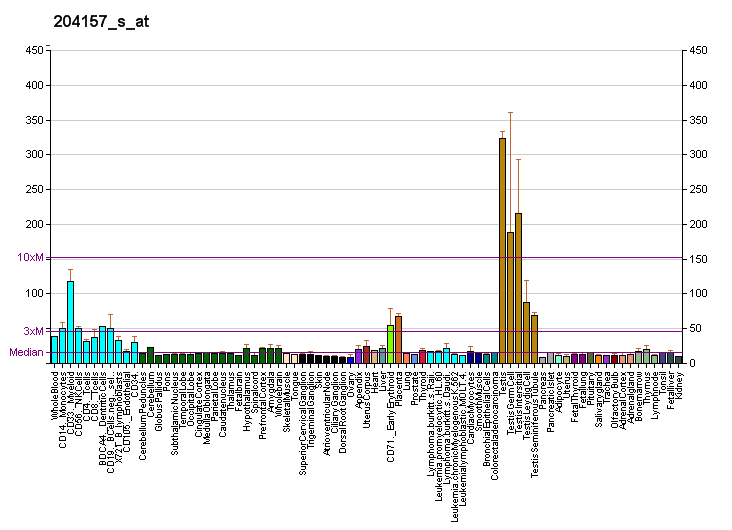
RNA expression pattern
Bgee	Human / Mouse (ortholog); Top expressed in: external globus pallidus; corpus callosum; lateral nuclear group of thalamus; pars reticulata; sperm; pars compacta; inferior ganglion of vagus nerve; ventral tegmental area; middle frontal gyrus; subthalamic nucleus / Top expressed in: substantia nigra; lumbar subsegment of spinal cord; medial geniculate nucleus; medial dorsal nucleus; lateral geniculate nucleus; median eminence; arcuate nucleus; ciliary body; nucleus accumbens; inferior colliculi; More reference expression data
BioGPS	More reference expression data
Gene ontology
Molecular function	transferase activity; nucleotide binding; protein kinase activity; protein serine/threonine kinase activity; protein binding; ATP binding; magnesium ion binding; metal ion binding; kinase activity; tau-protein kinase activity
Cellular component	cytoplasm; nucleoplasm
Biological process	protein phosphorylation; phosphorylation; microtubule cytoskeleton organization; intracellular signal transduction
Sources:Amigo / QuickGO
Orthologs
Databases	NCBI: entry; OMA: entry
Species	Human	Mouse
Entrez	23387	70661
Ensembl	ENSG00000160584	ENSMUSG00000034135
UniProt	Q9Y2K2	Q6P4S6
RefSeq (mRNA)	NM_001281748; NM_001281749; NM_025164; NM_001366686; NM_001366687	NM_027498
RefSeq (protein)	NP_001268677; NP_001268678; NP_079440; NP_001353615; NP_001353616	NP_081774
Location (UCSC)	Chr 11: 116.84 – 117.1 Mb	Chr 9: 45.92 – 46.14 Mb
PubMed search
- Wikidata
View/Edit Human	View/Edit Mouse

Serine/threonine-protein kinase SIK3 is an enzyme that in humans is encoded by the SIK3 gene. It enhances TORC1 and TORC2 signaling, along with protein phosphorylation. It is part of the salt-inducible kinase family
