= Hugh Auchincloss (immunologist) =

American immunologist

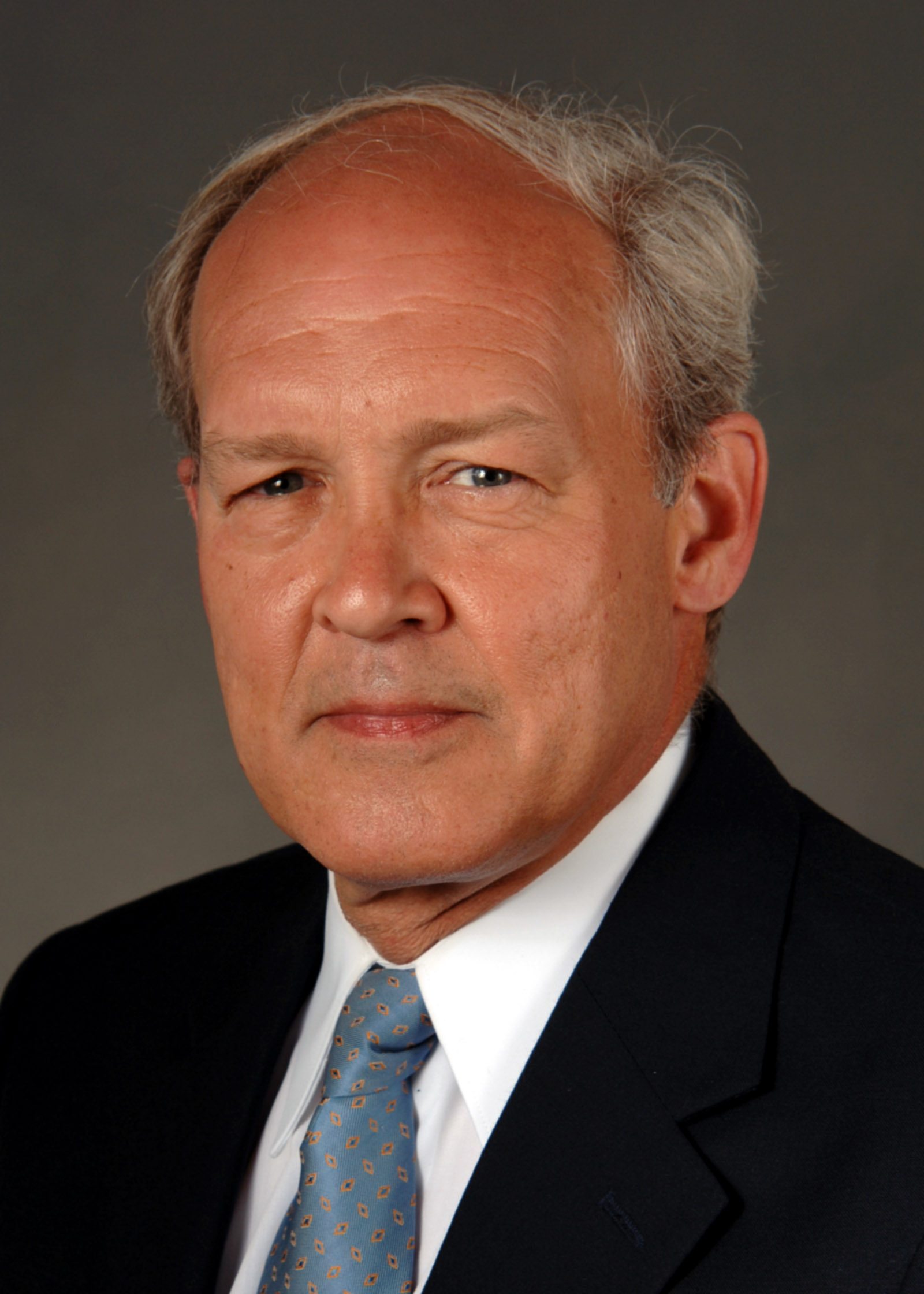

Director of the National Institute of Allergy and Infectious Diseases
- Acting; 1 January 2023 – 24 September 2023
- Preceded by: Anthony Fauci
- Succeeded by: Jeanne Marrazzo

Personal details
- Born: Hugh Auchincloss Jr. March 15, 1949 (age 77) New York City, U.S.
- Spouse: Laurie Glimcher (m. 1973, divorced)
- Children: 3, including Jake
- Education: Yale University (BA, MA); Harvard University (MD)

Hugh Auchincloss, Jr. (/ˈɔːkɪnklɒs/ AW-kin-kloss; born March 15, 1949) is an American immunologist and physician who served as the acting director of the National Institute of Allergy and Infectious Diseases from January to August 2023. Previously, he was the principal deputy director of the NIAID, from 2006 to 2022. Prior to government service, Auchincloss was a transplant surgeon and full professor of surgery at Harvard Medical School, and researched at Massachusetts General Hospital for 17 years.

== Early life and education ==
Hugh Auchincloss, Jr., was born in New York City on March 15, 1949 to Hugh Auchincloss, Sr. (1915−1998), and Katharine Lawrence Bundy. His mother was the daughter of lawyer Harvey Hollister Bundy, and the granddaughter of banker William Lowell Putnam. Auchincloss Sr., was a surgeon at Columbia University and The Valley Hospital. His father is the first cousin once-removed of stockbroker Hugh D. Auchincloss.

Auchincloss graduated from Groton School. At Yale University, he completed an A.B. magna cum laude in political science and economics in 1972, and a master's degree in economics. Auchincloss graduated with Phi Beta Kappa honors. He completed his M.D. from Harvard Medical School in 1976.

== Career ==
Auchincloss was a transplant surgeon and professor of surgery at Harvard Medical School. For more than 17 years he operated a laboratory in transplantation immunology at Massachusetts General Hospital. His initial area of interest was in xenotransplantation. In 1998, he founded the Juvenile Diabetes Research Foundation Center for Islet Transplantation and served as its director until 2003. He subsequently served as chief operating officer of the NIAID Immune Tolerance Network.

In 2006, he joined the National Institute of Allergy and Infectious Diseases (NIAID) as the principal deputy director. He led the development of the Institute's strategic plan and chaired the NIAID Research Initiative Committee, an internal governance group that designed and implemented a more efficient approach to planning, developing, and approving NIAID initiatives. Auchincloss is part of an NIAID senior leadership group responsible for reviewing all aspects of HIV/AIDS research policy, including the evaluation of “test and treat” strategies, analysis of results of pre-exposure prophylaxis (PrEP) clinical trials (including microbicide trials), and coordination of future HIV/AIDS vaccine clinical trials.

Auchincloss has served as the NIH point of contact for the Emergency Use Authorization program since 2006.

In January 2023, Auchincloss succeeded Anthony Fauci as the acting NIAID director. He served in the position until the seventh NIAID director, Jeanne Marrazzo, was appointed in August 2023.

=== COVID-19 related activity ===
Emails between Dr. Anthony Fauci and Auchincloss regarding NIAID involvement in gain-of-function research and the COVID-19 pandemic were featured during a hearing of the Republican House Energy and Commerce Committee on 2 June 2021.

=== Medical advisory ===
Auchincloss was elected president of the American Society of Transplantation in 2005. He has authored scientific articles and texts and serves on the editorial boards of scientific publications. Auchincloss is on federal and NIH-wide committees, including the Trans-Federal Task Force on Optimizing Biocontainment Oversight, the National Security Strategy/Office of Science and Technology Policy on Optimizing Biological Select Agents and Toxins Working Group, and the National Biodefense Science Board. He was appointed as co-chair of the International Clinical Research Subcommittee of the NIH Global Health Research Working Group and as a member of the NIH and Translational Science Awards Advisory Board.

== Personal life ==
On August 26, 1973, Auchincloss married Laurie Glimcher at the Memorial Church of Harvard University; they were both first-year Harvard Medical School students. They had 3 children including politician Jake Auchincloss. In 2010, he married Mary L. McCain Ph.D.

Government offices
Preceded by Anthony Fauci	Director of the National Institute of Allergy and Infectious Diseases; Acting; 2023	Incumbent
