= Melvin J. Glimcher =

American pioneer in the development of artificial limbs

- Born: Melvin Jacob Glimcher; June 2, 1925; Brookline, Massachusetts, U.S.
- Died: May 12, 2014 (aged 88); New York City, New York, U.S.
- Burial place: Sharon Memorial Park; Sharon, Massachusetts
- Education: Purdue University (BS, BS); Harvard University (MD); Massachusetts Institute of Technology (MS)
- Children: 3, including Laurie
- Scientific career
- Fields: Biomedical engineering
- Institutions: Harvard Medical School

Melvin Jacob Glimcher (June 2, 1925 – May 12, 2014) was an American pioneer in the development of artificial limbs. He helped develop the "Boston Arm," the electronically-operated design of which was incorporated in many later prostheses.

== Early life ==
Glimcher was born in Brookline, Massachusetts, on June 2, 1925, and grew up in nearby Chelsea, Massachusetts. His parents were Russian Jewish immigrants. His family owned a garment factory, and while in high school he worked as a sportswriter for the local newspaper.

He joined a U.S. Marine Corps unit at Purdue University, West Lafayette, Indiana, where he continued his education and, after being discharged, earned two bachelor's degrees, one in mechanical engineering and one in science. He attended Harvard Medical School (HMS), Boston, Massachusetts, to work on his doctoral degree. After graduating magna cum laude from HMS, Glimcher completed his clinical training in orthopedic surgery at Massachusetts General Hospital (Mass General), Boston, and Boston Children's Hospital.

== Career ==
After also completing graduate school studies and research at Massachusetts Institute of Technology (MIT), Cambridge, Glimcher returned to HMS and became the first tenured chair in orthopedic surgery.

In the early 1960s, Glimcher was an orthopedic surgeon at Mass General. At 39, Dr. Glimcher was appointed to the first tenured chair in orthopedic surgery at Harvard. He also headed the amputee clinic at the Liberty Mutual Insurance (now Liberty Mutual Group), Hopkinton, Massachusetts, and found that individuals with transradial amputations were using prostheses to recoup much more of their lost functioning than were individuals with transhumeral amputations. His frustration with existing devices for transhumeral amputees led him to put together a group of institutions to develop a myoelectric elbow. The first Boston Arm was a joint effort of the Liberty Mutual Insurance Research Institute for Safety, MIT, HMS, and Mass General to rehabilitate persons who had suffered upper-limb loss.

Among his other appointments, Glimcher served as a trustee of the Hospital for Special Surgery, New York, New York, and as a director of New England Sinai Hospital, Stoughton, Massachusetts. He was also awarded an honorary doctor of engineering degree by Purdue University in 2004.

He is buried in the Sharon Memorial Park.

== Awards and honors ==
- First tenured chair in orthopedic surgery, Harvard Medical School
- Honorary doctor of engineering degree, Purdue University
- Dr. Melvin J. Glimcher Fund for Science Scholarship at Purdue University

== Personal life ==
Dr. Glimcher was married twice, to Geraldine Lee Bogolub, and then Karin Wetmore. Both marriages ended in divorce. He was survived by three daughters from his first marriage: Susan, Laurie, and Nancy Glimcher; six grandchildren; and one great-grandchild.

His second daughter, Dr. Laurie Glimcher, is a leading immunologist and hospital administrator who became interested in science as a girl during her visits to her father's laboratory. She became dean of Weill Cornell Medical College in Manhattan in 2011 after decades at Harvard Medical School. They were the first father and daughter to hold endowed professorships at Harvard Medical School. She returned to Boston's Longwood Medical Area in 2016 to become President and CEO of Dana–Farber Cancer Institute. His grandson Jake Auchincloss, is the Congressman from the Massachusetts's 4th congressional district.
