= Jake Auchincloss =

American politician (born 1988)

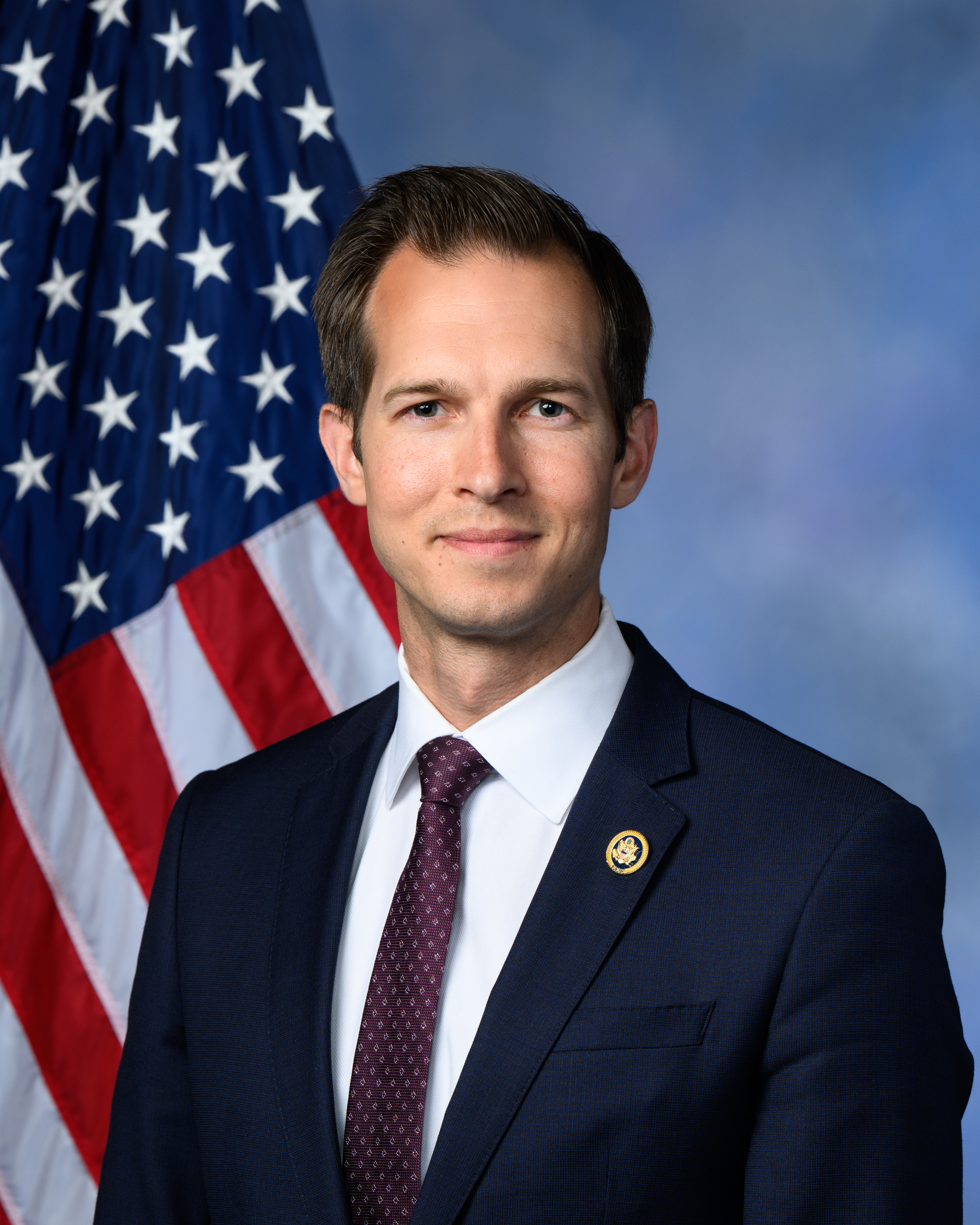
- Official portrait, 2024

Member of the U.S. House of Representatives from Massachusetts's 4th district
- Incumbent
- Assumed office January 3, 2021
- Preceded by: Joe Kennedy III

Personal details
- Born: Jacob Daniel Auchincloss; January 29, 1988 (age 38) Newton, Massachusetts, U.S.
- Party: Democratic (before 2013, 2015–present)
- Other political affiliations: Independent (2014–2015); Republican (2013–2014)
- Spouse: Michelle Auchincloss (m. 2017)
- Children: 3
- Parents: Hugh Auchincloss; Laurie Glimcher
- Relatives: Melvin J. Glimcher (grandfather); Harvey Bundy (great-grandfather); McGeorge Bundy (grand-uncle); See Auchincloss family
- Education: Harvard University (BA); Massachusetts Institute of Technology (MBA)
- Website: House website Campaign website

Military service
- Branch/service: United States Marine Corps; United States Marine Corps Reserve
- Years of service: 2010–2015 (active); 2015–present (reserve)
- Rank: Major
- Battles/wars: War in Afghanistan
- Auchincloss's voice Auchincloss on his career in the tech industry at the 2022 State of the Net conference. Recorded February 2022

Jacob Daniel Auchincloss (/ˈɔːkɪnklɒs/ AW-kin-kloss; born January 29, 1988) is an American politician, businessman, and Marine Corps officer serving as the U.S. representative for Massachusetts's 4th congressional district since 2021. A member of the Democratic Party, he previously served as a member of the Newton City Council from 2015 to 2021.

Born to a prominent family in New England, Auchincloss graduated with a bachelor's degree from Harvard University in 2010. Commissioned into the U.S. Marine Corps that same year, he was deployed to Afghanistan in 2012 and to Panama in 2014. He currently serves in the Marine Corps Reserve with the rank of major.

Returning home from the military, Auchincloss ran for Newton city council in 2015. After his election victory, he earned an MBA from the Massachusetts Institute of Technology (MIT) and was re-elected in 2017 and 2019. In 2020, he was elected to the United States Congress at age 32, succeeding Joe Kennedy III, who had retired to run for Senate.

== Early life and education ==
Jacob Daniel Auchincloss was born on January 29, 1988, in Newton, Massachusetts, to Laurie Glimcher and Hugh Auchincloss. He is Jewish by matrilineality and was raised Jewish. His father is of Scottish ancestry. Both of his parents are physician-scientists specializing in immunology. His father, also a surgeon, served briefly as the interim director of the National Institute of Allergy and Infectious Diseases after Anthony Fauci resigned in 2023. His mother is a scientist and the former president and CEO of Dana–Farber Cancer Institute. Auchincloss's maternal grandfather, Melvin J. Glimcher, pioneered the development of artificial limbs and the robotic arm, and was chair of orthopedic surgery at Harvard University. Auchincloss's grandfather was first cousin once removed from Hugh D. Auchincloss Jr., step-father to both First Lady of the United States Jacqueline Kennedy and author Gore Vidal.

Auchincloss was raised in Newton with his sister, Kalah, and brother, Hugh III, and attended Newton North High School.

Auchincloss studied government and economics at Harvard University, graduating in 2010 with a Bachelor of Arts with honors. He served in the U.S. Marine Corps then returned to school and earned a Master of Business Administration in finance in 2016 from the MIT Sloan School of Management.

== Career ==
=== Military service ===
After graduating from Harvard, Auchincloss joined the United States Marine Corps, earning his commission through Officer Candidates School in Quantico, Virginia. He commanded infantry in Helmand Province in 2012 and a reconnaissance unit in Panama in 2014. In Helmand, he led combat patrols through villages contested by the Taliban. In Panama, his team of reconnaissance Marines partnered with Colombian special operations to train the Panamanian Public Forces in drug-interdiction tactics.

Auchincloss completed both infantry training in Quantico and the Marine Corps's reconnaissance training in California, profiled in Nate Fick's One Bullet Away. He graduated from the Survival, Evasion, Resistance, and Escape (SERE) school in Maine and was an honor graduate from the Basic Airborne Course in Georgia. He remained in the Individual Ready Reserve after leaving active duty and was promoted to major on September 1, 2020.

=== Local government ===
After returning home from the military, Auchincloss worked for Charlie Baker's successful 2014 gubernatorial campaign.

In 2015, Auchincloss ran for Newton City Council on a platform of full-day kindergarten and expanded pre-K offerings. He defeated the incumbent councilor. He was reelected to the Newton City Council in 2017 and 2019. He chaired the transportation and public safety committee. In office, he supported progressive immigration and housing policies, sustainable transportation and co-docketed the successful Sanctuary city ordinance.

When the Newton City Council debated a pay raise for elected officials, Auchincloss voted no. Auchincloss was the first elected official to endorse Ruthanne Fuller for mayor of Newton.

=== Business ===
While serving on the Newton City Council and attending MIT, Auchincloss was the director of the MIT $100K Entrepreneurship Competition. He also worked at a cybersecurity startup as a product manager and at Liberty Mutual as a senior manager at its innovation arm, Solaria Labs.

== U.S. House of Representatives ==
=== Elections ===
==== 2020 ====
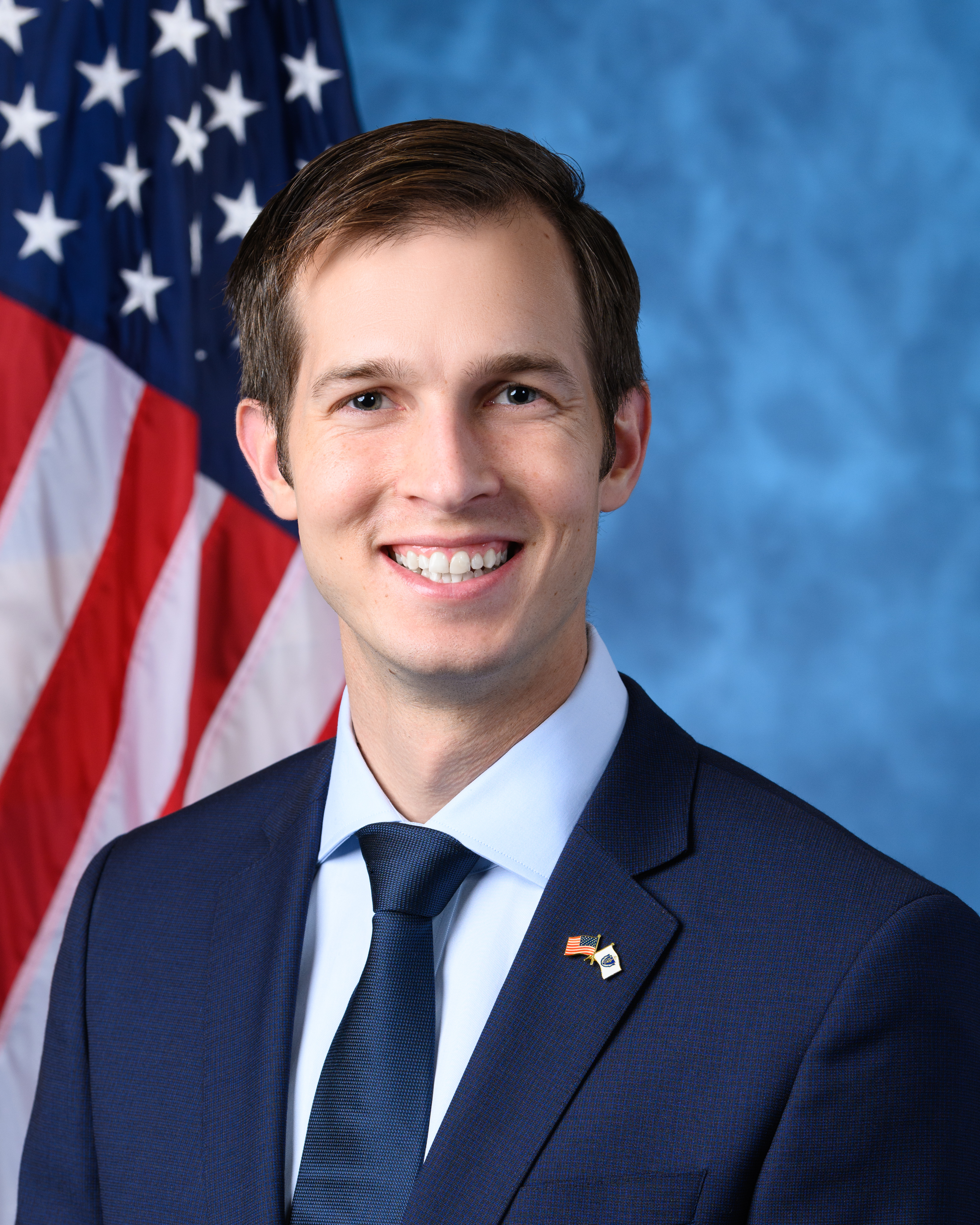
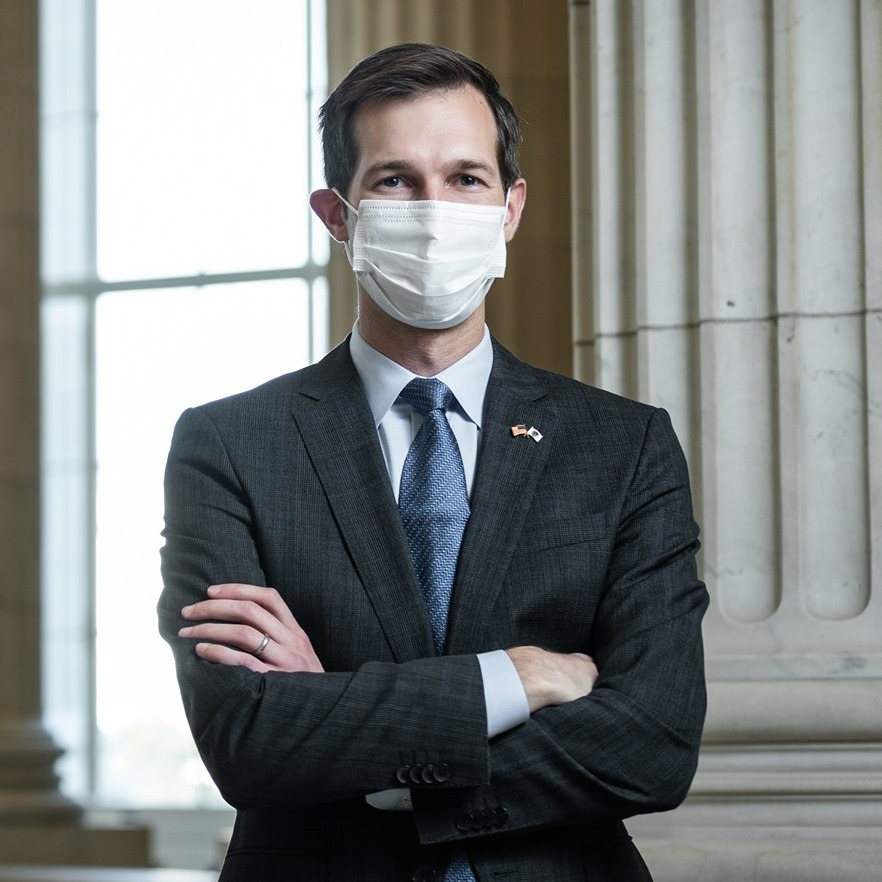
Auchincloss's portraits during the 117th Congress

On October 2, 2019, Auchincloss announced his candidacy for the open Massachusetts's 4th congressional district to succeed Joe Kennedy III, who unsuccessfully ran for the Senate against incumbent Democrat Ed Markey.

Auchincloss raised the most money during the primary election in both the fourth quarter of 2019 and the first quarter of 2020 and earned endorsements from the National Association of Government Employees, VoteVets, The Boston Globe and James E. Timilty. He earned the support of several Newton politicians, including the president and vice president of the city council and the chair and vice chair of the school committee. He earned additional endorsements throughout the district.

During the campaign, questions arose about his party affiliation. Auchincloss was originally a Democrat but was a registered Republican from 2013 to 2014 while working for Charlie Baker's gubernatorial campaign. He continued to vote in Republican primaries as an independent until late 2015 before becoming a Democrat again.

Auchincloss faced some controversies throughout the campaign and apologized for his old statements that defended the harassment of Black students with a Confederate flag for protecting Newton's free speech values and compared it to banning a pride flag or Black Lives Matter banner, appeared to justify the burning of the Quran, for making fun of a local community efforts' to rename Columbus Day "Indigenous Peoples' Day" in 2016 and he voted against a symbolic 1 percent decrease in the local police budget. He modeled himself after the moderate Republican Governor Charlie Baker.

The Democratic primary took place on September 1, 2020. In a race with eight other candidates, Auchincloss won with 22.4% of the vote. It took the Associated Press three days to call the race because nearly one million votes were cast through mail-in ballots due to the COVID-19 pandemic.

In the November general election, Auchincloss defeated Republican nominee Julie Hall by 21.9% margin while the district voted for Joe Biden by 30.8% margin in the 2020 United States presidential election on the same ballot. He assumed office on January 3, 2021.

==== 2026 ====
Auchincloss declared his intent to run for reelection in September, 2025, after speculation that he would challenge incumbent Ed Markey for the Democratic nomination in the 2026 United States Senate election in Massachusetts. He defeated Jason Poulos, an AI researcher, in the Democratic primary.

Opposition to his campaign accepting $25,000 in donations from Palantir Technologies, including $7,000 from Alex Karp, Palantir's CEO, led to demonstrations outside his Newton office.

=== Tenure ===
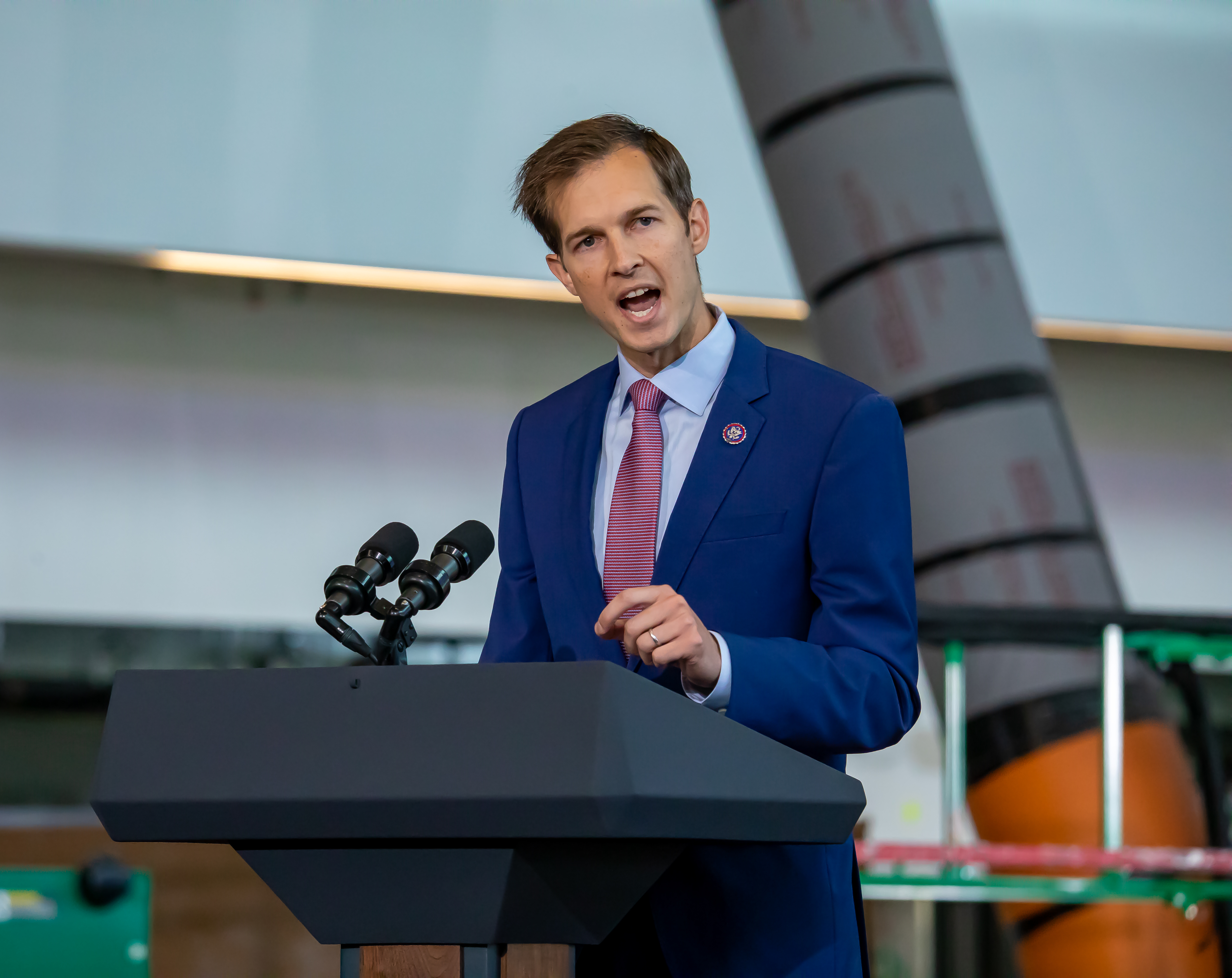
Auchincloss speaking at Boston Logan International Airport in support of the Infrastructure Investment and Jobs Act, September 2022

On January 6, 2021, after the 2021 attack on the United States Capitol, Auchincloss tweeted his agreement with lawmakers' calls to remove President Donald Trump from office, either through the Twenty-fifth Amendment to the United States Constitution or impeachment. Auchincloss voted to certify the results of the 2020 United States presidential election in the early morning of January 7, 2021. On January 21, he voted to approve the congressional waiver for General Lloyd Austin, President Joe Biden's nominee for Secretary of Defense.

On June 16, 2022, seven people affiliated with The Late Show with Stephen Colbert, including Robert Smigel, were arrested by U.S. Capitol Police and charged with unlawful entry into the complex. According to a letter from Jim Jordan and Rodney Davis, the Colbert crew was let back into the building with the help of Auchincloss and Adam Schiff, leading to the unlawful entry charges. In a statement released by an Auchincloss spokesperson, Matt Corridoni said of the incident, "We do not condone any inappropriate activity and cannot speak to anything that occurred after hours."

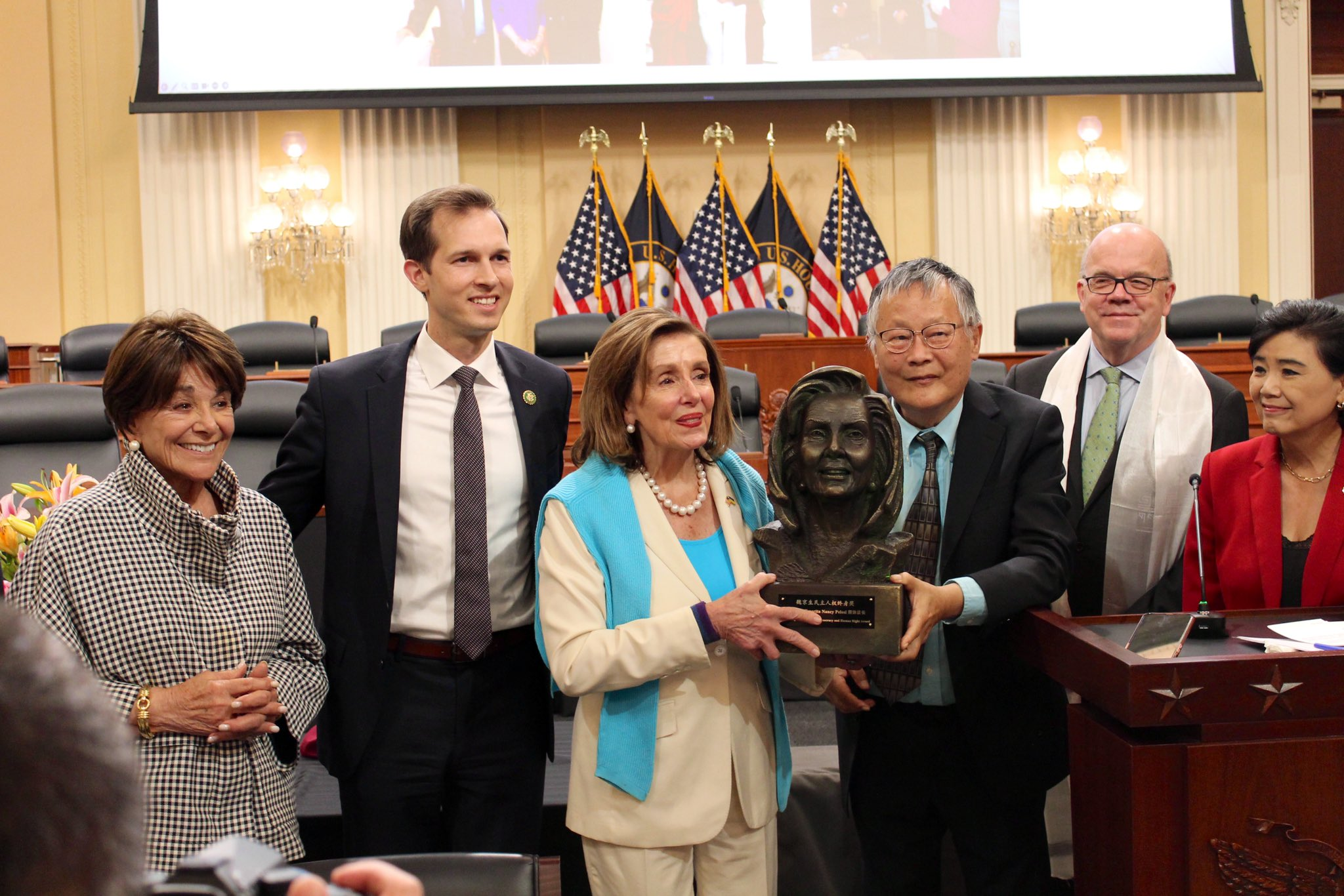
Auchincloss with Speaker Nancy Pelosi and Wei Jingsheng, 2023

In Congress, Auchincloss voted with President Joe Biden 100% of the time according to FiveThirtyEight. This gives him a Biden Plus/Minus score of +1 with higher support for Biden than would be expected given the makeup of his district. Auchincloss backed Biden to run for re-election in 2024 and urged Democrats to more aggressively defend him despite concerns about his age and health, including on right wing media.

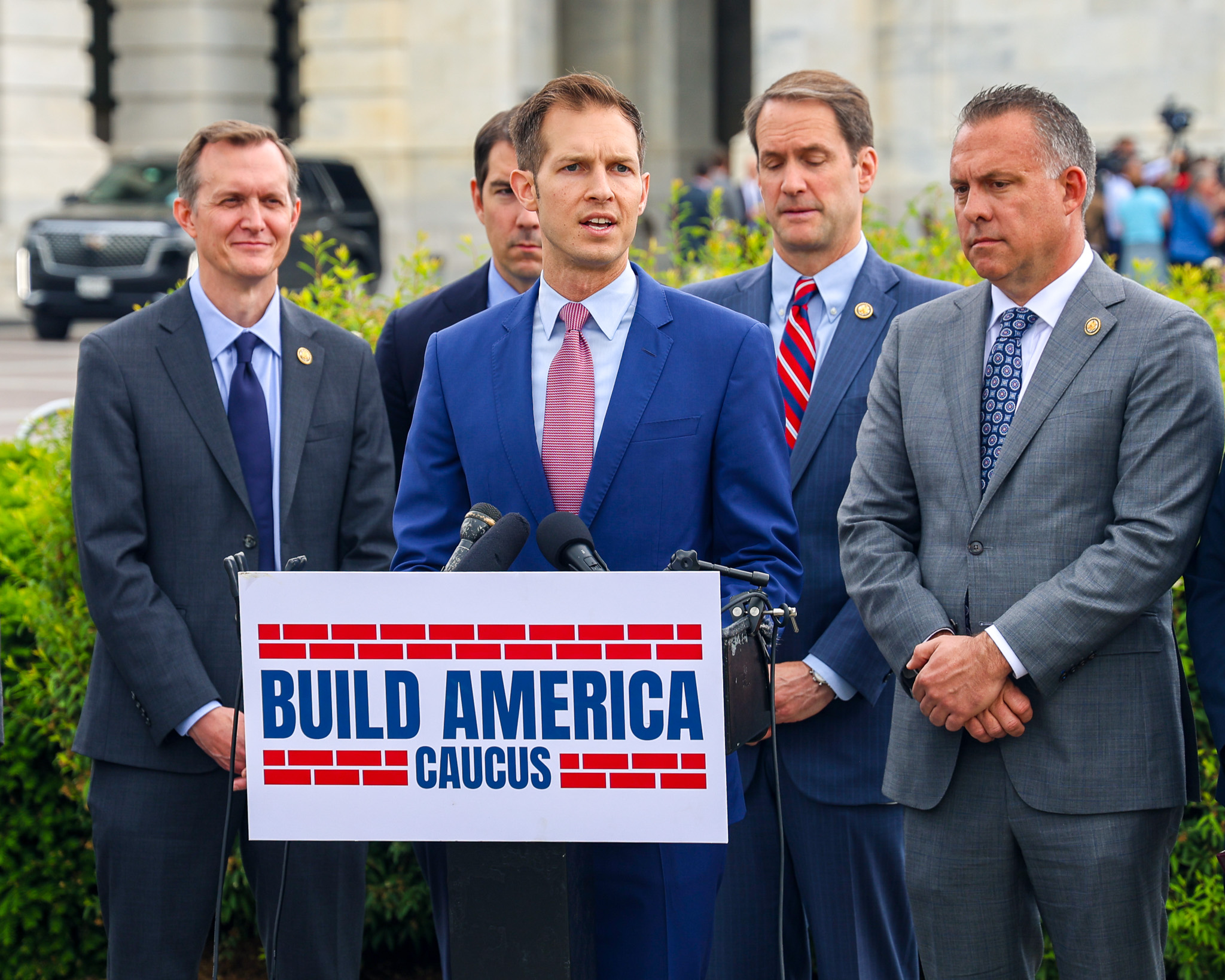
Auchincloss speaking during a YIMBY press conference, May 2025

On January 25, 2023, Auchincloss delivered a one-minute speech on the House floor entirely generated using ChatGPT, making it the first speech in Congress to be written with artificial intelligence programs. The speech was about creating a U.S.–Israel research facility centered on artificial intelligence.

Auchincloss endorsed Pennsylvania governor Josh Shapiro for role of Kamala Harris' running mate in the 2024 Presidential election outlining his centrist appeal, "Harris needs to win Pennsylvania, signal moderation and reassure Haley voters that she'll stand up to the left. The more the Twitter left piles on [Shapiro], the more helpful he is to Harris."

On September 17, 2025, Auchincloss told The Boston Globe that he would not be challenging Ed Markey in the Democratic primary for U.S. Senate in Massachusetts, ending long-running speculation that he may join the race. He said he would instead be focusing on serving as the inaugural chairman of Majority Democrats, a new group of Democratic elected officials.

== Political positions ==
In 2022, Auchincloss criticized the far-left and far-right as "carnival barkers for socialism or strong-man rule". He said that the goal is not to "scold the other side" but to "work on what the two sides agree on". He has held varied political positions over his career, starting as a Republican in local government, then running for Congress as a moderate, and later emphasizing his progressivism in his first term in Congress. He returned to his moderate positions after his first term in 2022.

Auchincloss calls himself a Barack Obama-Charlie Baker Democrat and is a critic of the Democratic Party's progressive wing. He is a fan of Jonathan Haidt's moral psychology and believes Democrats lost ground by not being seen as upholding "social order", which he defines as care, fairness, authority, and loyalty. He argues that the "cost disease" is a key factor eroding this sense of order and has also targeted social-media companies for delivering "digital dopamine" to children, citing Haidt as an influence. He said that open-air encampments should be cleared and criticized Democrats for not being "muscular" enough in addressing homelessness and crime. He has argued that the current Democratic Party is too preoccupied with policing ideology, "There used to be this old joke: 'Democrats fall in love and Republicans fall in line', it is exactly the opposite. Democrats are much more ideologically straitjacketed these days. We cancel each other." He said that he misses when "it was cool to be a Democrat." Reflecting on the party's pre-COVID image, he recalled Bill Clinton's 1992 saxophone performance on The Arsenio Hall Show, calling it "the coolest freaking thing".

=== Budget ===
Auchincloss has called for balancing the budget, "The last president to balance the budget was a Democrat, Bill Clinton, every single president since then has put either tax cuts or spending on a credit card … I think there's an opening for Democrats to say, the last president to balance the budget was a Democrat. The next president is going to be a Democrat, too."

=== Big Tech ===
Auchincloss has authored a bill to raise the age of internet adulthood to 16. He has said that the political left is "carrying the water" for some of the most "pernicious and nefarious corporations in modern history", specifically referring to social media companies. He expressed his reluctance to accept criticism of corporate power from them, arguing that they were inadvertently supporting these powerful tech corporations. Auchincloss co-sponsored the bipartisan TikTok forced divestiture or ban bill. He said that the legislation is not just about national security but also about controlling social media companies' "attention fracking" and that it is self-evident that TikTok is disproportionately promoting anti-America and anti-Israel content to its American users. He called TikTok "digital fentanyl".

=== Drug pricing ===
Auchincloss attracted attention in 2021 for his objections to H.R. 3 (Elijah Cummings Lower Drug Costs Now Act), House Democrats' prescription drug pricing reform. Alongside Representative Scott Peters, he co-authored a letter to Speaker Nancy Pelosi warning that international reference pricing "would discourage research and development" and undermine the "innovation ecosystem". Auchincloss later specifically objected to H.R. 3's clause capping prescription prices subject to federal negotiation at 120% of the average price in Australia, Canada, France, Germany, Japan, and the United Kingdom and argued that "price controls … because of the uncertainty they create, are a massive deterrent to risk capital that invests in the next generation of drugs" warning of lost jobs in Massachusetts' biotechnology sector.

Health policy experts characterized these arguments as indistinguishable from pharmaceutical industry rhetoric; Boston University professor Rena Conti remarked that "there is very limited daylight, if any, between what his position was in May and Pharma's positions," while Harvard Medical School's Aaron Kesselheim described the claims as a "scare tactic". Auchincloss' position drew additional scrutiny because his 2020 campaign had benefited from a super PAC Experienced Leadership Matters which raised a total of $575,000; funded partly by pharmaceutical insiders, including $105,000 from his mother, Dr. Glimcher, the president of Dana-Farber Cancer Institute and a GlaxoSmithKline board member, and because he had personally raised nearly $95,000 from top executives and investors in the industry. Progressive groups criticized him for "blocking efforts to lower your drug prices" and mounted local pressure campaigns and ads, after which he became a co-sponsor of H.R. 3. Auchincloss' office rejected claims of undue influence, stating that "donations do not impact his views" and that he "doesn't make his decisions based on positive or negative IEs".

=== Economics, free trade and populism ===
In response to polling by the progressive group Demand Progress showing that pro-growth "abundance agenda" messaging performed significantly worse with voters than anti-corporate economic populist themes, Auchincloss dismissed the findings saying, "It’s what happens when you test an economic textbook for the Democratic Party against a romance novel, it's such a bad poll."

Auchincloss has argued that "the Republicans engage in identity politics that is intertwined with Christian nationalism. The Democrats engage in identity politics that is intertwined in evaluating individuals based on group identity, rather than as individuals. I think the path for Democrats is to reject both". He added, "I'm worried that the version that Democrats are going to align on is Diet Coke when MAGA is Coca-Cola: dial down the wokeism and then amplify the economic populism." and has instead called for supply-side economics that avoids protectionism, embraces free trade as a tool to contain China, and more closely resembles the now-"unfashionable" approaches associated with Bill Clinton and Barack Obama.

He has criticized the "boldface-name Democrats have been leaning into populism". He has promoted an "abundance agenda" and has likened left-wing populism to "offering a Diet Coke to voters who ordered a Coca-Cola" and asked Democrats to reject it. He said Democrats "win by offering an agenda of our own, not a diluted version of MAGA."

=== Israel ===
While running for Congress in 2020, Auchincloss said "I grew up in the Jewish tradition and was raised with the conviction that Jews everywhere must support one another and the State of Israel in order to secure our collective well-being" and that he has a "visceral appreciation for how dangerous a neighborhood Israel exists in." He stated "unconditional military aid and strong bilateral security ties are essential foundations for U.S.-Israel relationship." and "there are red lines for me, like BDS and conditioning aid to Israel".

Auchincloss voted to provide Israel with support following the 2023 Hamas attack on Israel. In October 2023, Auchincloss rejected calls for a ceasefire in the Gaza war, saying that "Calls for de-escalation, even if well-meaning, are premature, Israel needs the military latitude to re-establish deterrence and root out the nodes of terrorism. Israel did not ask America to de-escalate on September 12, 2001." He rejected Massachusetts Senator Ed Markey’s call for de-escalation saying, "Now is not the time for equivocation. Hamas is an internationally recognized terrorist organization … Israel is a liberal democracy with the right and responsibility to defend itself and its citizens."

At a July 2025 town hall in Newton, Massachusetts, Auchincloss faced public criticism over his stance on the ongoing war in Gaza. Auchincloss reiterated his position that Hamas bore sole responsibility for the conflict and humanitarian crisis, asserting that the militant group was is "singularly responsible for atrocities in the Middle East right now" and had "singular power" to end the war by releasing hostages. While acknowledging unacceptable humanitarian conditions in Gaza and disputing Israeli prime minister Benjamin Netanyahu’s claim that there was no starvation, Auchincloss said that the blame lay primarily with Hamas. He described the group as having "eviscerated" the Palestinian people over the previous 15 years and cited instances of violence attributed to it. He has been described as a pro-Israel lawmaker. Auchincloss supported US strikes on Iran with Israel in the Twelve-Day War.

Auchincloss authored a letter to Secretary of State Marco Rubio urging caution and diplomatic engagement following a landmark Arab League statement condemning Hamas and supporting a two-state solution. He described the statement as "a rare and urgent opportunity" to disarm Hamas and advance peace and criticized "unilateral and performative recognitions of a Palestinian state" as emboldening Hamas and undermining peace, calling instead for U.S.-led diplomacy rooted in "mutual recognition, security, and dignity". He urged Rubio "to use every tool available" to help secure the release of hostages and remove Hamas from power, calling it "a chance to protect Israel–our strongest ally–and align American values with regional momentum, and also leave a lasting legacy."

On July 15, 2026, Auchincloss announced he would vote for an amendment cutting off aid to Israel and the Israel Defense Forces. In his statement, he cited Donald Trump and Benjamin Netanyahu's "disastrous war against Iran, [Israel's] empowerment of settler violence in the West Bank, and their strategic incoherence against Islamic terrorism" and indicated a desire to revisit such funding in the 2027 appropriations cycle. He also wrote that Israel has the right to defend itself from terrorist groups and that it remains a close U.S ally. He later described his vote as a signal of opposition to the Iran war and said "I represent a pro-Israel, anti-Netanyahu district and this is a pro-Israel, anti-Netanyahu vote." to Jewish Insider.

=== Marijuana ===
As of July 2025, Auchincloss has received an "A" rating from the National Organization for the Reform of Marijuana Laws (NORML) based on public statements and voting records.

=== Race ===
In August 2023, Auchincloss was one of nine House Democrats who voted in favor of a Republican-led amendment to the National Defense Authorization Act (NDAA) prohibiting the teaching of "race-based theories" in schools operated by the Department of Defense Education Activity, introduced by Republican Representative Chip Roy. While most Democrats opposed the amendment as part of a broader Republican effort to target so-called "Critical Race Theory", Auchincloss described it as a "tough vote". In a statement, he said he was "reluctant to lend credence to the GOP's parade of preposterous claims about the military, an institution I served and deeply respect for historically being on the vanguard of diversity and inclusion efforts." However, he also argued that the amendment was "tightly constructed to affirm that the military shouldn't teach service members' children that any race is inherently superior to any other or that an individual's worth is determined by their race", calling it "an appropriate affirmation for military schools at a time when both the military and schools are under increasing political pressure from bad actors on the right."

=== Committee assignments ===
- Committee on Energy and Commerce
  - Subcommittee on Energy
  - Subcommittee on Environment
  - Subcommittee on Health

=== Caucus memberships ===
- BIOTech Caucus
- Congressional Blockchain Caucus
- Congressional Jewish Caucus
- Congressional LGBTQ+ Equality Caucus
- Congressional YIMBY Caucus
- Congressional Ukraine Caucus
- Future Forum
- Rare Disease Caucus
- Kids Online Safety Caucus

== Electoral history ==
US House election, 2020: Massachusetts District 4
Primary election
Party	Candidate	Votes	%
Democratic	Jake Auchincloss	35,361	22.40
Democratic	Jesse Mermell	33,216	21.04
Democratic	Becky Grossman	28,578	18.11
Democratic	Natalia Linos	18,364	11.63
Democratic	Ihssane Leckey	17,539	11.11
Democratic	Alan Khazei	14,440	9.15
Democratic	Chris Zannetos (withdrawn)	5,135	3.25
Democratic	David Cavell (withdrawn)	2,498	1.58
Democratic	Ben Sigel	2,465	1.56
Write-in		242	0.15
Total votes		157,838	100
General election
Democratic	Jake Auchincloss	251,102	60.83
Republican	Julie Hall	160,474	38.87
Write-in		1,247	0.30
Total votes		412,823	100
Democratic hold			

US House election, 2022: Massachusetts District 4
Primary election
Party	Candidate	Votes	%
Democratic	Jake Auchincloss (incumbent)	67,738	99.29
Write-in		481	0.71
Total votes		68,219	100
General election
Democratic	Jake Auchincloss (incumbent)	201,882	96.93
Write-in		6,397	3.07
Total votes		208,279	100
Democratic hold			

US House election, 2024: Massachusetts District 4
Primary election
Party	Candidate	Votes	%
Democratic	Jake Auchincloss (incumbent)	64,238	98.86
Write-in		742	1.14
Total votes		64,980	100
General election
Democratic	Jake Auchincloss (incumbent)	289,347	97.19
Write-in		8,378	2.81
Total votes		297,725	100
Democratic hold			

US House election, 2026: Massachusetts District 4
Primary election
Party	Candidate	Votes	%
Democratic	Jake Auchincloss (incumbent)	66,952	73.08
Democratic	Jason Poulos	24,524	26.77
Write-in		144	0.16
Total votes		91,620	100
General election
Democratic	Jake Auchincloss (incumbent)	201,643	66.50
Republican	Tom Stalcup	100,330	33.09
Write-in		1,243	0.41
Total votes		303,216	100
Democratic hold			

== Personal life ==
On July 28, 2017, Auchincloss married Michelle. They have three children: a son and two daughters. They live in Newtonville, Massachusetts.

== See also ==
- List of Harvard University politicians
- List of Jewish members of the United States Congress

U.S. House of Representatives
Preceded by Joe Kennedy III	Member of the U.S. House of Representatives from Massachusetts's 4th congressional district 2021–present	Incumbent
U.S. order of precedence (ceremonial)
Preceded by Marlin Stutzman	United States representatives by seniority 240th	Succeeded by Cliff Bentz
