= Jeanne Marrazzo =

American microbiologist

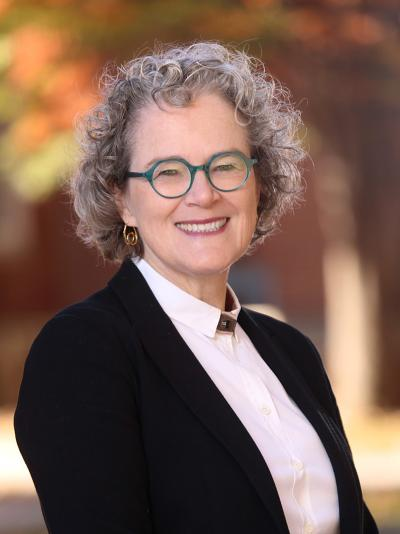
- Marrazzo in 2023

6th Director of the National Institute of Allergy and Infectious Diseases
- In office September 24, 2023 – April 24, 2025
- Deputy: Hugh Auchincloss
- Preceded by: Anthony Fauci
- Succeeded by: Jeffery Taubenberger (acting)

Personal details
- Education: Radcliffe College (BA); Thomas Jefferson University (MD); University of Washington (MPH)
- Scientific career
- Fields: Infectious diseases
- Workplaces: University of Washington School of Medicine; University of Alabama at Birmingham; National Institutes of Health
- Thesis: Selective Screening Criteria for Chlamydia Trachomatis Infection in Women Attending Region X Family Planning and STD Clincs: Performance and Cost-Effectiveness (1994)

Jeanne Marisa Marrazzo is an American physician-scientist and infectious diseases specialist serving as the chief executive officer of the Infectious Diseases Society of America since 2026. She was the director of the University of Alabama at Birmingham School of Medicine Division of Infectious Diseases and focused on prevention of HIV infection using biomedical interventions. Marrazzo is a fellow of the American College of Physicians and Infectious Disease Society of America. On August 2, 2023 Lawrence A. Tabak, acting director for the National Institutes of Health (NIH), named Jeanne M. Marrazzo as the sixth director of NIH’s National Institute of Allergy and Infectious Diseases.

== Early life and education ==
Growing up in Dunmore, Pennsylvania, Marrazzo chose to get into a career in medicine because her mother was a nurse and her role model. She earned her undergraduate degree in biology from Radcliffe College and her medical degree from Jefferson Medical College at Thomas Jefferson University. Marrazzo later completed residency training and chief residency in internal medicine at Yale-New Haven Hospital.

== Career ==
Marrazzo joined the faculty at the University of Washington School of Medicine in 1995. While there, she co-founded the Lesbian/Bisexual Women’s Health Study with nurse practitioner Kathleen Stine after noticing an unusual number of middle-aged women had abnormal Pap smears. The results of their findings secured them funding from the National Institute of Allergy and Infectious Diseases (NIAID) to investigate the prevalence and routes of transmission of various STDs among lesbian and bisexual women. This led to a co-authored study titled Pap Smear Screening and Prevalence of Genital Human Papillomavirus Infection in Women Who Have Sex with Women, which found that out of 300 women in the Seattle area, 13 percent tested positive for HPV and 4 percent had pre-cancerous changes on a Pap test. The following year, she was elected a Fellow of the American College of Physicians.

In 2005, Marrazzo co-authored a study with David N. Fredricks and Tina L. Fiedler titled Molecular Identification of Bacteria Associated With Bacterial Vaginosis, which focused on the causes of bacterial vaginosis. In 2008, Marrazzo was appointed a member of the Subspecialty Board on Infectious Disease by the American Board of Internal Medicine (ABIM), and four years later was named its chair. During this time, Marrazzo was elected a Fellow of the Infectious Disease Society of America and Bennett Lorber Visiting Professor at Temple University. From 2009 until 2012, Marrazzo conducted the VOICE (Vaginal and Oral Interventions to Control the Epidemic) Study through the Microbicide Trials Network. The study was a randomized, placebo-controlled trial which examined the effects of daily use of oral tenofovir disoproxil fumarate had on over 5,000 women from 15 sites in South Africa, Uganda and Zimbabwe. The final published paper failed to prove that oral pre-exposure prophylaxis (PrEP) or of a tenofovir-containing vaginal microbicide gel was effective in lowering the risk of HIV.

Considered an expert in the field of HIV prevention, Marrazzo was appointed a co-chair of an interdisciplinary panel of experts to create a guideline in achieving an AIDS-free generation. The guidelines, which were later published in the Journal of the American Medical Association, integrated evidence-based behavioral interventions for people with HIV or at high risk for HIV infection. Her efforts in HIV prevention earned her the 2015 American Sexually Transmitted Diseases Association (ASTDA) Achievement Award and appointment to chair of the American Board of Internal Medicine Council.

In 2016, Marrazzo succeeded Edward W. Hook, III as director of the University of Alabama School of Medicine Division of Infectious Diseases. After stepping down as president of the International Society for STD Research, she was named to the Infectious Diseases Society of America board of directors. On October 23, 2019, she was named principal investigator of a three-year $3.5 million grant study from NIAID to test the effectiveness of the Bexsero vaccine in protecting vulnerable populations from gonorrhea. During the COVID-19 pandemic, Marrazzo studied whether blood clots could result in the spread of the virus through the human body. She also oversaw clinical trials of remdesivir as a treatment against COVID-19 at the University of Alabama at Birmingham.

In August 2023, Marrazzo was named director of NIH’s National Institute of Allergy and Infectious Diseases (NIAID), succeeding acting director Hugh Auchincloss. As a lesbian, she is one of the first members of the LGBT community to hold the position.

She was elected a Member of the National Academy of Medicine in 2024.

On March 31 during the 2025 United States federal mass layoffs, Marrazzo was placed on administrative leave at NIAID and offered a position at the Indian Health Service. On September 4, she joined a whistleblower complaint against research grant cancellations, and allegations that administration policies were endangering public health and safety. Secretary of Health Robert F. Kennedy Jr. terminated Marrazzo’s employment at NIAID, in a letter dated 26 September 2025.

In January 2026, Marrazzo became the chief executive officer of the Infectious Diseases Society of America.

== Selected publications ==
- Marrazzo, Jeanne M.; Ramjee, Gita; Richardson, Barbra A.; Gomez, Kailazarid; Mgodi, Nyaradzo; Nair, Gonasagrie; Palanee, Thesla; Nakabiito, Clemensia; van der Straten, Ariane; Noguchi, Lisa; Hendrix, Craig W.; Dai, James Y.; Ganesh, Shayhana; Mkhize, Baningi; Taljaard, Marthinette (2015-02-05). "Tenofovir-Based Preexposure Prophylaxis for HIV Infection among African Women". New England Journal of Medicine. 372 (6): 509–518. doi:10.1056/NEJMoa1402269. ISSN 0028-4793. PMC 4341965. PMID 25651245.
- Unemo, Magnus; Bradshaw, Catriona S; Hocking, Jane S; de Vries, Henry J C; Francis, Suzanna C; Mabey, David; Marrazzo, Jeanne M; Sonder, Gerard J B; Schwebke, Jane R; Hoornenborg, Elske; Peeling, Rosanna W; Philip, Susan S; Low, Nicola; Fairley, Christopher K (9 July 2017). "Sexually transmitted infections: challenges ahead". The Lancet Infectious Diseases. 17 (8): e235–e279. doi:10.1016/s1473-3099(17)30310-9. ISSN 1473-3099. PMID 28701272.
- Van Gerwen, Olivia T.; Muzny, Christina A.; Marrazzo, Jeanne M. (2 August 2022). "Sexually transmitted infections and female reproductive health". Nature Microbiology. 7 (8): 1116–1126. doi:10.1038/s41564-022-01177-x. ISSN 2058-5276. PMC 9362696. PMID 35918418.

Government offices
Preceded by Hugh Auchincloss; Acting	6th Director of the National Institute of Allergy and Infectious Diseases; 2023-present	Incumbent
