= Salt-inducible kinase =

Salt-inducible kinases, also known as SIK enzymes, are a family of proteins found in most animal species. They are a type of serine-threonine kinase enzymes. They were originally isolated from the adrenal glands of rats fed with a high-salt diet. SIK enzymes are part of a system of proteins which act as a sensor of intracellular sodium levels and activate the Na(+),K(+)-ATPase to expel excess sodium from the cytosol, which is then excreted in urine by the kidneys. There are three subtypes, SIK1, SIK2 and SIK3. SIK1 is induced by cAMP and represses the activity of CRE-binding protein (CREB). SIK1 is also involved with regulating steroidogenic enzyme production during steroidogenesis. In recent years, SIK enzymes have attracted interest as a potential target for anti-cancer drugs, as well as playing a role in other processes such as hypertension and acute kidney injury. They are also involved in the tanning response following UV exposure.

== Inhibitors ==
- YKL-05-099
