= Erk =

Erk or ERK may refer to:

== Politics ==
- Estonian Nationalists and Conservatives, political party in Estonia
- Erk (historic party), a socialist party in Bashkiria, Bukhara and Turkestan from 1919 to 1921
- Erk Democratic Party, a political party in Uzbekistan

== People ==
- Edmund Frederick Erk (1872–1953), American politician
- Erk Russell (1926–2006), American college football coach
- Erk Sens-Gorius (born 1946), German fencer
- Kutlay Erk, Cypriot politician
- Ludwig Erk (1807–1883), German musicologist
- Erk, a mage from the tactical role-playing game Fire Emblem: The Blazing Blade

== Other uses ==
- Erk, Hungary, a municipality in Hungary
- Enköpings RK, a Swedish rugby union club
- Extracellular signal-regulated kinases, a kind of protein molecule
- Nafsan language
- Erk, an aircraftman in Royal Air Force slang
